= 2013 New Year Honours =

British honours and awards

The New Year Honours 2013 were appointments by some of the 16 Commonwealth realms to various orders and honours to recognise and reward good works by citizens of those countries. The New Year Honours are awarded as part of the New Year celebrations at the start of January.

The New Year Honours were announced on 28 December 2012 in the United Kingdom of Great Britain and Northern Ireland, on 31 December 2012 in New Zealand, and 28 December 2012 in the Cook Islands, Barbados, Grenada, Solomon Islands, Saint Vincent and the Grenadines, Saint Christopher and Nevis, Belize, and Antigua and Barbuda,

The recipients of honours are displayed as they were styled before their new honour and arranged by the country (in order of precedence) whose ministers advised The Queen on the appointments, then by honour with grades i.e. Knight/Dame Grand Cross, Knight/Dame Commander etc. and then divisions i.e. Civil, Diplomatic and Military as appropriate.

== United Kingdom ==
Below are the individuals appointed by Elizabeth II in her right as Queen of the United Kingdom, on advice of the British Government.

=== Member of the Order of the Companions of Honour (CH) ===
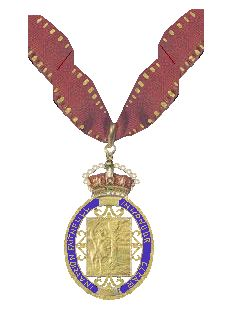
The riband and badge of a Member of the Order of the Companions of Honour

- Sebastan Newbold, Baron Coe, KBE, Chair, LOCOG. For services to the London 2012 Olympic and Paralympic Games.
- Professor Peter Ware Higgs, Emeritus Professor of Theoretical Physics, University of Edinburgh. For services to Physics.

=== Knights Bachelor ===
- Ben Ainslie CBE, Finn Sailor. For services to Sailing.
- Professor George Thomas Berwick CBE, Head teacher, Ravens Wood School, Bromley, Kent. For services to Education.
- Quentin Saxby Blake CBE, Illustrator. For services to Illustration.
- Dave Brailsford CBE, Performance Director, British Cycling. For services to Cycling and the London 2012 Olympic and Paralympic Games.
- Professor Keith Burnett CBE, Vice-Chancellor, University of Sheffield. For services to Science and Higher Education.
- Professor Ian David Diamond FRSE, Principal and Vice-Chancellor, University of Aberdeen. For services to Social Science and Higher Education.
- Kenneth Henry Grange CBE, Industrial Designer. For services to Design.
- Michael Aron Heller, Philanthropist. For charitable services.
- Peter Gerard Hendy CBE, Commissioner, Transport for London. For services to Transport and the community.
- Bernard Hogan-Howe QPM, Commissioner, Metropolitan Police. For services to Policing.
- John Mark Nicholas Leighton, Director-General, National Galleries of Scotland. For services to Art.
- Martin James Narey, Ministerial Adviser on Adoption. For services to Vulnerable People.
- Robert Stephen O'Brien CBE, Chairman, Barts and London NHS Trust. For services to Healthcare and to the community in London.
- Professor David Neil Payne CBE, Director, Optoelectronics Research Centre, University of Southampton. For services to Photonics Research and Applications.
- Hector William Hepburn Sants, Lately chief executive officer, Financial Services Authority. For services to Financial Services and Regulation.
- Richard Charles Scrimgeour Shepherd MP, Member of Parliament for Aldridge Brownhill. For public service.
- Martin Gregory Smith, philanthropist. For charitable services to Education, Science and the Arts.
- Christopher Stone, Executive Headteacher, The Arthur Terry and Stockland Green Schools, Birmingham. For services to Education.
- Professor Hew Francis Anthony Strachan DL, Chichele Professor of the History of War, All Souls College, Oxford. For services to the Ministry of Defence.
- David Tanner CBE, Performance Director, British Rowing. For services to Rowing and the London 2012 Olympic and Paralympic Games.
- Professor Simon Charles Wessely. For services to Military Healthcare and to Psychological Medicine.
- Bradley Wiggins CBE, Cyclist. For services to Cycling.
- Nicholas Stephen Williams, Lately Principal of The BRIT School, Croydon. For services to Education.
- David Wootton, Lord Mayor of London. For services to Legal Business, Charity and the City of London.
- Dr. Hossein Yassaie, chief executive officer, Imagination Technologies Group. For services to Technology and Innovation.

=== Order of the Bath ===
==== Knights / Dames Commander of the Order of the Bath (KCB / DCB) ====
Military Division

- Air Marshal Tim Anderson CB DSO
- Lieutenant General James Bucknall CBE late Coldstream Guards
- Vice Admiral Andrew Mathews CB
- Air Marshal Andrew Pulford CBE

Civil Division

- Ursula, Mrs. Brennan – Permanent Secretary, Ministry of Justice. For public service.
- Jonathan Evans – Director-General, the Security Service ("MI5"). For services to Defence.
- Robert Rogers – Clerk of the House and Chief Executive, House of Commons. For parliamentary and public service.

==== Companions of the Order of the Bath (CB) ====
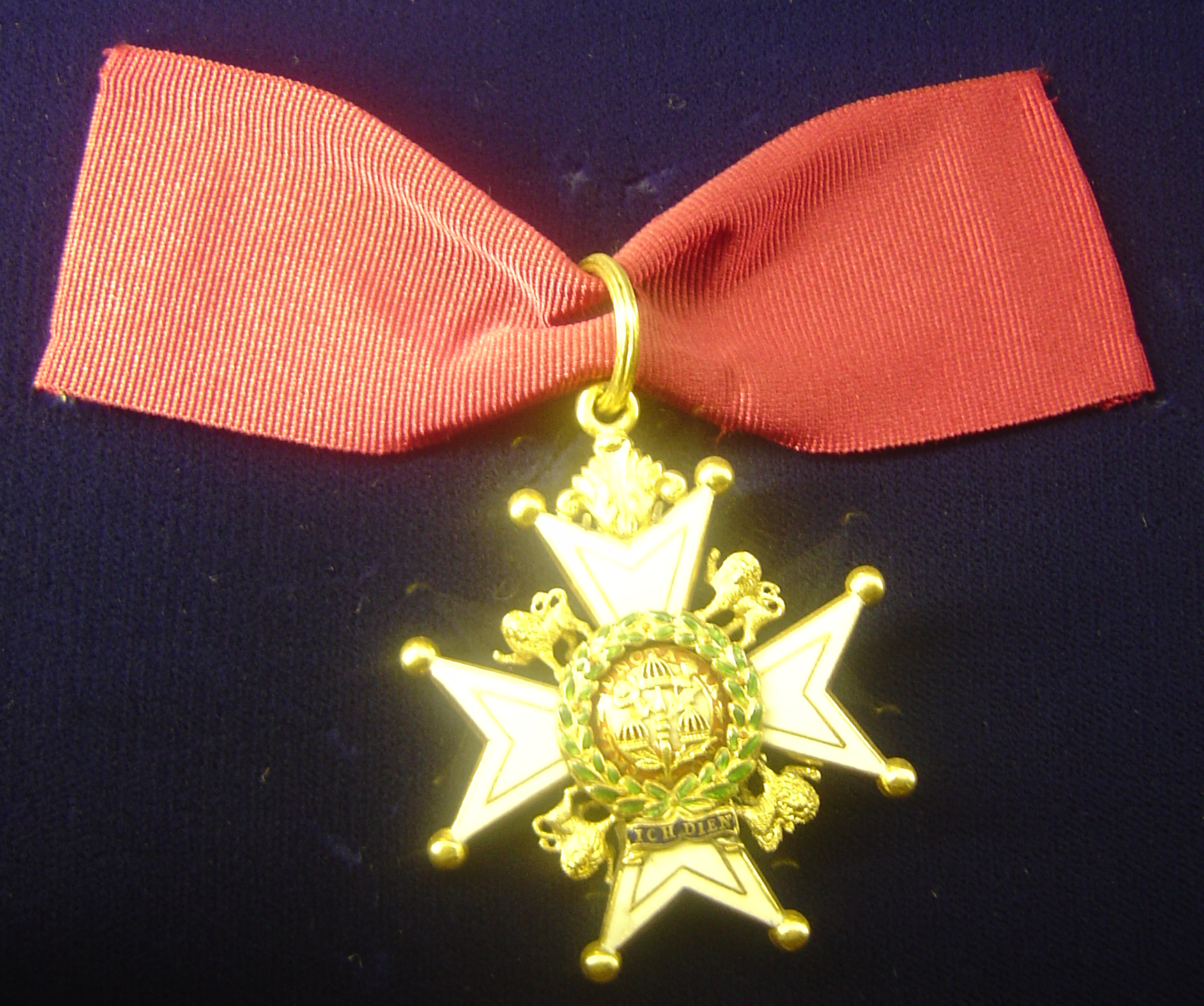
Badge of a Companion of the Military Division of the Order of the Bath

Military Division

- Major General Shaun Burley MBE late Corps of Royal Engineers
- Major General Ian Copeland late The Royal Logistic Corps
- Vice Admiral Anthony Johnstone-Burt OBE
- Rear Admiral Simon Lister OBE
- Air Vice-Marshal Raymond Pentland
- Major General Greg Smith QVRM TD DL late The Royal Green Jackets, Territorial Army
- Air Vice-Marshal Julian Young OBE

Civil Division

- Jeremy Beeton – Director-General, Government Olympic Executive. For services to the London 2012 Olympic and Paralympic Games.
- Mridul Hedge – Director, Financial Stability, HM Treasury. For services to the Stabilisation of the British Banking System.
- Trevor Llanwarne – Government Actuary. For services to the Actuarial Profession and Public Finances and to Public Service Pension Reform.
- Stephen Lovegrove – Chief Executive, Shareholder Executive. For services to the Government as Shareholder.
- Oswyn Paulin – Head of Government Legal Service, Northern Ireland Executive. For services to Government in Northern Ireland and voluntary service through the Scout Association.
- Alison Saunders – Chief Crown Prosecutor for London, Crown Prosecution Service. For services to Law and Order especially after the 2011 London riots.
- Michael Weightman – Her Majesty's Chief Nuclear Inspector, Office for Nuclear Regulation, Health and Safety Executive. For services to the Improvement of Nuclear Safety.

=== Order of Saint Michael and Saint George ===
==== Knights / Dames Commander of the Order of St Michael and St George (KCMG/DCMG) ====
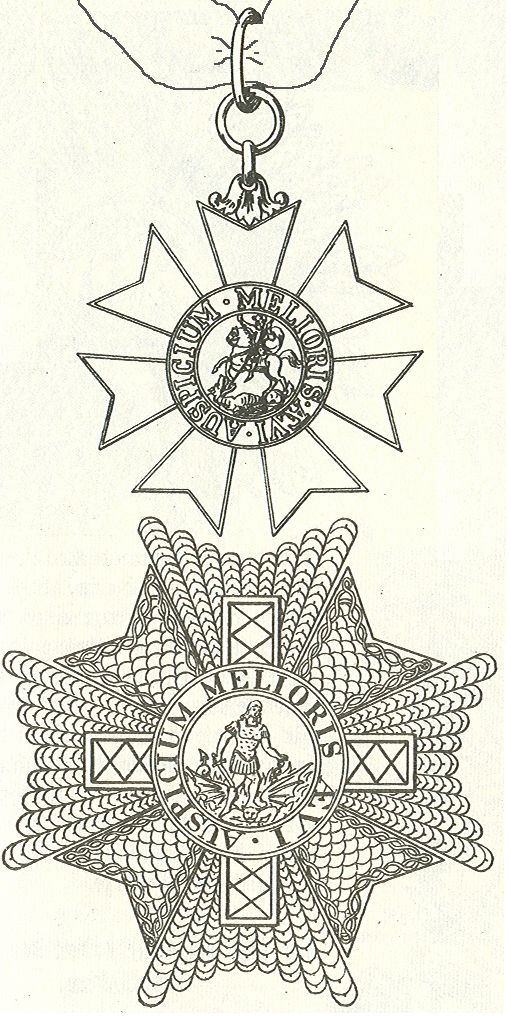
Star and badge of a Knight / Dame Commander of the Order of St. Michael and St. George

- Robert Cooper CMG MVO – Lately Counsellor, European External Action Service. For services to international peace and security.
- Dr. DeAnne Julius CBE – Lately Chair, Royal Institute of International Affairs, Chatham House. For services to international relations.
- Iain Lobban CB – Director, Government Communications Headquarters (GCHQ). For services to UK national security.

==== Companions of the Order of St Michael and St George (CMG) ====
- Professor William Robert Duncan – Lately Deputy Secretary General, The Hague Conference on Private International Law. For services to the development of international law, particularly international child protection.
- Charles Peter Grant – Director, the Centre for European Reform. For services to European and wider international policy-making.
- Robert Peter Hannigan – Director-General of Defence and Intelligence, Foreign and Commonwealth Office. For services to UK national security.
- Simon Charles Martin – Lately Protocol Director, Foreign and Commonwealth Office and Vice-Marshal of the Diplomatic Corps. For services to UK diplomatic interests.
- Karen Anne Sage McFarlane – Information Counsellor, Foreign and Commonwealth Office. For services to information security.
- Andrew Jonathan Mitchell – Lately Director, London 2012 Olympics, Paralympics and GREAT Campaign, Foreign and Commonwealth Office. For services to London 2012 Olympic and Paralympic Games and to UK diplomatic interests.
- Timothy Giles Paxman LVO – HM Ambassador, Spain. For services to UK interests in Spain and Mexico.
- John Andrew Raine OBE – Director, Foreign and Commonwealth Office. For services to international diplomacy.

=== Royal Victorian Order ===
==== Knights Commander of the Royal Victorian Order (KCVO) ====
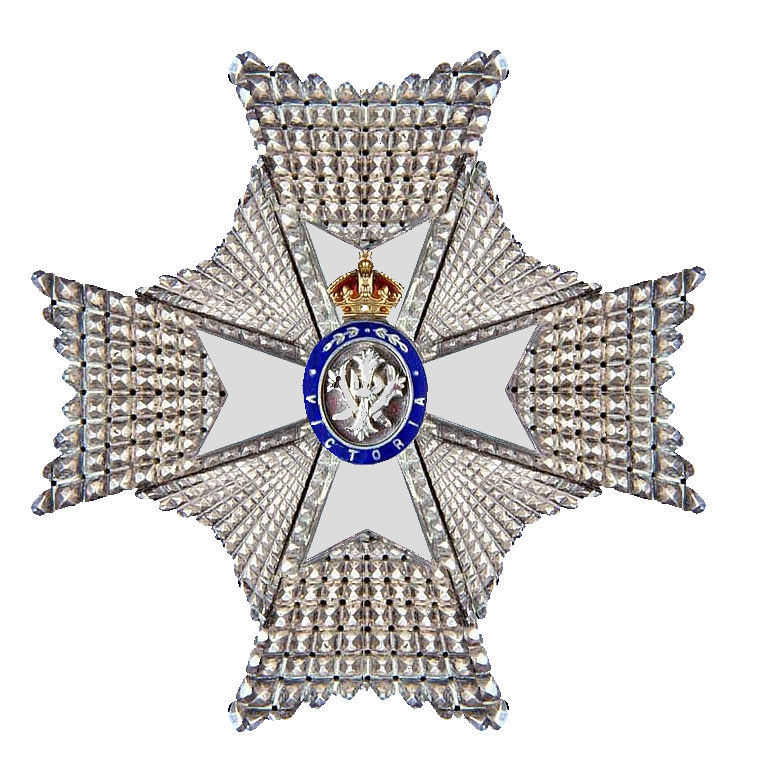
Insignia of a Knight / Dame Commander of the Royal Victorian Order

- Charles James Dugdale, The Lord Crathorne – Lord Lieutenant of North Yorkshire.
- Martin Dunne – Lord-Lieutenant of Warwickshire.
- Captain John David Bingham Younger LVO – Lord Lieutenant of Tweeddale.

==== Commanders of the Royal Victorian Order (CVO) ====
- Roy Brown LVO – Deputy Property Services Director, London Palaces, Royal Household.
- Jonathan Marsden LVO – Director of the Royal Collection and Surveyor of the Queen's Works of Art.
- Miriam Watts LVO – formerly Head of Personnel and Administration to the Household of The Prince of Wales and The Duchess of Cornwall.

==== Lieutenants of the Royal Victorian Order (LVO) ====
- Clive Alderton – formerly Private Secretary for Foreign and Commonwealth Affairs to The Prince of Wales and The Duchess of Cornwall.
- Nicholas Hall – Senior Director, HSBC Global Asset Management.
- Rosemary Hamer – Deputy Private Secretary to The Earl and Countess of Wessex.
- Heather Hancock – formerly Trustee, The Prince's Trust.
- Patrick Harverson – Communications Secretary to The Prince of Wales and The Duchess of Cornwall.
- Lieutenant Colonel Patrick Holcroft OBE DL – Trustee, The Grenadier Guards Regimental Trust.
- Catherine Jones MVO – Personnel Officer, Royal Household.
- Air Vice-Marshal Richard Kyle CB MBE – Gentleman Usher to The Queen.
- Lieutenant Colonel Alexander Matheson of Matheson, yr. – Secretary, Central Chancery of the Orders of Knighthood.
- Jamie Lowther-Pinkerton MVO MBE – Private Secretary and Equerry to The Duke and Duchess of Cambridge and Prince Henry of Wales.
- Brian Stanley MVO RVM – Stud Groom, Royal Paddocks, Hampton Court Palace.
- David Wilson MVO – Farm Manager, Duchy Home Farm.

Honorary

- Dhruv Sawhney – formerly chairman, International Liaison Group of The Duke of Edinburgh's Commonwealth Study Conferences.

==== Members of the Royal Victorian Order (MVO) ====
- Alison Jane Burke MBE – formerly Personal Assistant to The Private Secretary for Foreign and Commonwealth Affairs to The Prince of Wales and The Duchess of Cornwall.
- Leslie Edwin Chappell RVM – House Manager and Assistant to the Master of the Household to The Prince of Wales and The Duchess of Cornwall.
- Andrew Michael Fiddaman – formerly Manager Director, The Prince of Wales's Youth Business International.
- Ian Michael Grant – Production Controller, Royal Collection Enterprises.
- Margaret Jean Haines – Lieutenancy Officer, Berkshire.
- Chief Inspector Vincent John Hoar – Metropolitan Police. For services to Royalty Protection.
- Inspector Richard Johnathan Lett – Metropolitan Police. For services to Royalty Protection.
- Alison Flora MacMillan – Deputy Director of Protocol and Assistant Marshal of the Diplomatic Corps.
- Jacqueline Meakin RVM – Dresser to The Duchess of Cornwall.
- Clara Pearce – Assistant Treasurer, Household of The Prince of Wales and The Duchess of Cornwall.
- Superintendent John Greg Peters – Director of Strategic Partnerships and Heritage, Royal Canadian Mounted Police.
- Christopher Roy Stevens – Superintendent of the Royal Collection, Hampton Court Palace.
- Rustom Tata – Partner, DMH Stallard.

=== Royal Victorian Medal ===
==== Royal Victorian Medal (Silver) ====
- Doreen Fraser – Daily Lady, Palace of Holyroodhouse.
- Patrick Greenfield – Facilities Co-ordinator, The Prince's Trust.
- John Heighway – Lay Clerk, St. George's Chapel.
- Thomas Lee – formerly Head Warden, Crown Estate, Windsor.
- Anthony Martin – Palace Attendant, Windsor Castle.
- Frances McCaffery – Principal Attendant, Government House, Wellington, New Zealand.
- Arthur Pottinger – General Assistant, California Store, Windsor Castle.
- Michelle Redpath – Switchboard Operator, Royal Household.
- Divisional Sergeant Major Peter Saul – The Queen's Body Guard of the Yeomen of the Guard.
- Stephen Searle – formerly Forestry Manager, Crown Estate, Windsor.
- Robert Turvey RVM formerly Sawmill Sales Manager, Sandringham Estate. (bar)
- Marion Wortley – Principal Attendant, Government House, Wellington, New Zealand.

=== Order of the British Empire ===
==== Knights / Dames Grand Cross of the Order of the British Empire (GBE) ====
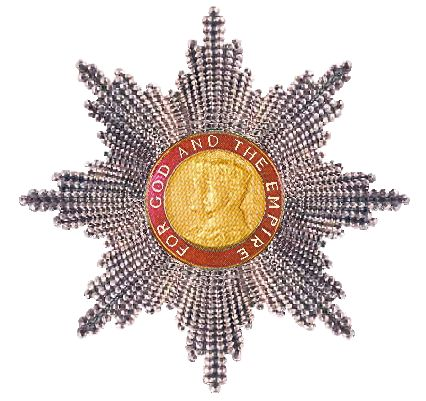
Insignia of a Knight / Dame Grand Cross of the Order of the British Empire

- Sir Alan Peter Budd. For services to Economic Policy and the Office for Budget Responsibility.
- Sir Keith Edward Mills. For services to the London 2012 Olympic and Paralympic Games.

==== Knights / Dames Commander of the Order of the British Empire (KBE / DBE) ====
- The Rt Hon. Margaret Beckett MP – Member of Parliament for Derby South. For public and political service.
- Dr. Christine Braddock CBE – Principal and Chief Executive, Birmingham Metropolitan College. For services to Further Education.
- Sally Coates – Principal, Burlington Danes Academy, Hammersmith. For services to Education.
- Prof. Sarah Cowley – For services to Health Visiting.
- The Rt Hon. The Lord Deighton – chief executive officer, LOCOG. For services to the London 2012 Olympic and Paralympic Games.
- Nancy Hallett OBE – Former Chief Executive, Homerton University Hospital NHS Foundation Trust. For services to Healthcare.
- Helen Hyde – Headmistress, Watford Grammar School for Girls, Hertfordshire, and President, Foundation and Aided Schools National Association. For services to Education.
- Joan McVittie – Headteacher, Woodside High School, Haringey, and Past President, Association of School and College Leaders. For services to Education.
- Priscilla Newell OBE JP – For services to the Pension Industry and to Charity.
- Vicki Paterson – Executive Headteacher, Brindishe Green School, Brindishe Lee School and Lee Manor School, Lewisham. For services to Education.
- Carol V. Robinson – Professor of Physical Chemistry, University of Oxford. For services to Science and Industry.
- Sarah Storey OBE – Cyclist. For services to Para-Cycling.
- Angela Watkinson MP – Member of Parliament for Hornchurch and Upminster. For public and political service.

==== Commanders of the Order of the British Empire (CBE) ====
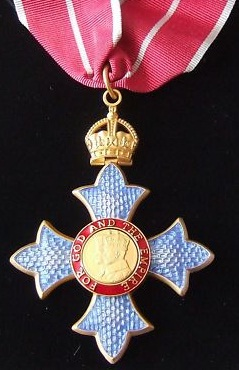
Neck badge of a Commander of the Military Division of the Order of the British Empire

Military Division

- Air Commodore Nigel Beet OBE
- Rear Admiral Simon Charlier
- Colonel Gareth Collett late The Royal Logistic Corps
- Brigadier Edward Forster–Knight OBE late Adjutant General's Corps (Royal Military Police)
- Brigadier Peter Fox late Royal Regiment of Artillery
- Brigadier John Lawrence MBE late The Royal Gurkha Rifles
- Colonel Matthew Porter OBE
- Group Captain Dominic Stamp
- Air Commodore Margaret West

Civil Division

- Professor Josephine Dawn Adès, OBE, Professor of Art History and Theory, University of Essex. For services to Higher Education and Art History.
- Reginald William Bailey, Chief Executive, Mothers' Union. For service to Children and Families.
- Alexander Charles Beard, Deputy Director, Tate. For services to the Arts.
- Peter John Luther Beaumont, QC, Recorder of London. For services to the Administration of Justice.
- John Michael Berman, Chairman, Southbank Sinfonia. For services to Music and Philanthropy.
- Cherie Blair, QC. For services to Women's Issues and to charity in the UK and Overseas.
- Dr. Steven Robert Boorman, Consultant in Occupational Health. For services to Occupational Medicine.
- John Peter Bothamley, Founder, the Four Acre Trust. For charitable services in the UK and Overseas.
- Dr. Terence George Bramall, Philanthropist. For charitable services.
- Timothy James Breedon, Lately Group Chief Executive, Legal and General Group and chairman, Association of British Insurers. For services to the Insurance Industry.
- Professor John Richard Britton, Honorary Consultant in Respiratory Medicine and Professor of Epidemiology, Nottinghamshire. For services to Respiratory Medicine.
- The Honourable Mr. Justice Thomas Alexander Burgess, Lately Presiding County Court Judge and Temporary High Court Judge and Recorder of Belfast. For services to the Administration of Justice.
- Kate Bush (Catherine Bush), Singer and Songwriter. For services to Music.
- Brian Cantor, Vice-Chancellor, The University of York. For services to Higher Education.
- Michael Maurice Cashman, Member of the European Parliament for the West Midlands and co-Founder, Stonewall. For public and political service.
- David Millar Clark, National Clinical Adviser, Department of Health. For services to Mental Health.
- Dr. David Douglas Cleevely, Founding Director, Centre for Science and Policy, University of Cambridge. For services to Technology and Innovation.
- James Michael Thomas Cochrane, Chairman, The British Red Cross Society. For services to Health.
- Neale Coleman, Director, London 2012, Greater London Authority. For services to the London 2012 Olympic and Paralympic Games.
- Neil Couling, Work Services Director, Department for Work and Pensions. For public service.
- Sherry Coutu, Angel Investor. For services to Entrepreneurship.
- Barry Geoffery Cox, Chairman, Digital UK. For services to the Media and Digital Television.
- Philip Gotsall Cox, Chief Executive Officer, International Power. For services to the Energy Industry.
- John Geraint Davies. For voluntary and charitable services in Wales.
- Helen Deeble, Chief Executive, P&O Ferries Division and President, UK Chamber of Shipping. For services to the Shipping Industry.
- Professor Raymond Allen Dwek, Professor of Glycobiology, Oxford University. For services to UK/Israel scientific collaboration
- Penelope Jane Egan, Executive Director, Fulbright Commission. For services to international education
- Professor Joseph Stuart Elborn, Professor of Respiratory Medicine and Consultant Physician, Queen's University Belfast. For services to Healthcare in Northern Ireland.
- Tracey Emin, Artist. For services to the Arts.
- Jessica Ennis, MBE, Heptathlete. For services to Athletics.
- Professor Eileen Evason. For services to Disadvantaged People in Northern Ireland.
- Mohamed Farah, Athlete. For services to Athletics.
- John James Fenwick, Deputy Chairman, Fenwick Limited. For services to the Retail Business.
- Nicholas Eustace Haddon Ferguson, Chair, Courtauld Institute. For services to Philanthropy and Higher Education.
- Duncan Struthers Fletcher, Chair, Forth Holdings. For services to Business and to the community in Stirlingshire.
- Professor Gary Ashley Ford, Director, UK Stroke Research Network and Clinical Director, Newcastle University. For services to research in Stroke Medicine.
- Christine Forster, Operations Director, Child Support Agency, Department for Work and Pensions. For services to the Transformation of the Child Support System.
- Professor Judith Anne Freeman, Professor of Tax Law, Oxford University. For services to Tax Research.
- Professor Pamela Gillies, Principal and Vice-Chancellor, Glasgow Caledonian University. For services to Education and Public Health.
- Katherine Jane Grainger, MBE, Rower. For services to Rowing.
- David Goldstone, Finance and Programme Director, Government Olympic Executive. For services to the Financial Administration of the London 2012 Olympic and Paralympic Games.
- Professor Joanna Dorothy Haigh, Professor of Atmospheric Physics, Imperial College London. For services to Physics.
- Malcolm John Charles Harbour, Member of the European Parliament for the West Midlands. For services to the UK Economy.
- Professor Keith Gordon Harding, Director, Wound Healing Research Unit and director, TIME Institute, Cardiff University. For services to Medicine and Healthcare.
- Professor Jaqueline Hayden (Jaqueline Dunbar), Postgraduate Dean, North West Region. For services to Medical Education.
- Pauline Maria Hayes, Deputy Director and Head, Department for International Development Afghanistan. For service to the UK's International Development Effort in Afghanistan.
- Stephen Hugh Henwood, TD, Chairman, Nuclear Decommissioning Authority. For services to the Nuclear Industry and charity.
- Professor Richard Holdaway, Director of RAL Space, Rutherford Appleton Laboratory. For services to Science and Technology.
- Malcolm Hurlston, Founder and President, Consumer Credit Counselling Service. For Financial Services.
- Professor Leslie Lars Iversen, Chair, Advisory Council on the Misuse of Drugs. For services to Pharmacology.
- Deborah Ann Jevans, Director of Sport, LOCOG. For services to Sport and the London 2012 Olympic and Paralympic Games.
- Councillor Peter Jones, Leader, East Sussex County Council. For services to Local Government in the South East.
- Professor Francis Patrick Kelly, FRS, Professor of the Mathematics of Systems, University of Cambridge. For services to Mathematical Sciences.
- Tracey Kneale, Headteacher, Marlbrook Primary School, Herefordshire. For services to Education.
- Martha Lane Fox, UK Digital Champion. For voluntary services to the UK Digital Economy and to charity.
- Jane Lees, lately Headteacher, Hindley High School, Wigan. For services to Education.
- Isabel Letwin, Director, Legal Services, Department of Health. For Legal services to Government.
- Magnis Duncan Linklater, lately Editor, The Times in Scotland. For services to the Arts and Media in Scotland.
- Ian Livingstone, OBE, Life President, Eidos. For services to the Computer Gaming Industry.
- Richard Long, Landscape Artist and Sculptor. For services to Art.
- Ruth MacKenzie, OBE, Director, Cultural Olympiad. For services to the London 2012 Olympic and Paralympic Games.
- Rory Mair, Chief Executive, Convention of Scottish Local Authorities. For services to Local Government.
- Penny Mansfield, Director, OnePlusOne, London. For services to Children and Families.
- Peter Vincent Marks, Group Chief Executive, The Co-operative Group. For services to the Retail Trade.
- Diane Robertson Martin, lately Director, Trust, Lambeth. For services to Vulnerable Women.
- Peter David Mason, Parliamentary Security Director. For services to Parliament.
- Bernard Gerald (Brian) McCloskey, Regional Director, Health Protection Agency. For services to Public Health and Safety.
- John Charles McIntosh, OBE, Educator and Adviser. For services to Education.
- Professor Susan Mendus, Morrell Professor Emerita of Political Philosophy, University of York. For services to Political Science.
- Carolyn Elizabeth Miller, Chief Executive, Merlin. For services to International Humanitarian Aid.
- Janice Munday, Director, Advanced Manufacturing and Services, Department for Business, Innovation and Skills. For services to the Transformation of Business Support Schemes in England.
- Stephen Munday, Executive Principal, Comberton Village College, Cambridgeshire, and National Leader in Education, National College for School Leadership. For services to Education.
- Angela Mary O'Donoghue, lately Principal, City of Sunderland College. For services to Further Education.
- Professor Richard Jonathan Parker, Director of Research and Technology, Rolls-Royce Group. For services to Engineering.
- Victoria Louise Pendleton, MBE, Cyclist. For services to Cycling.
- Arlene Phillips, OBE, Choreographer. For services to Dance and to charity.
- Anthony William Pidgley, Chairman, Berkeley Group. For services to the Housing Sector and the community.
- David Tom Potts, Lately plc Board Member and Chief Executive, Tesco Asia. For services to Employment, Skills and Apprenticeships in the Retail Sector.
- Shabir Randeree, Chairman, DCD Group and Founding Member, EduTrust and Islamic Bank of Britain plc. For services to Business and Education.
- John Reilly, Principal, Mid-Cheshire College. For services to Further Education.
- Carolyn Robson, Headteacher, Rushey Mead School and lately Executive Headteacher, Fullhurst College, Leicester. For services to Education.
- Nicky Roche, Director, Operations, Government Olympic Executive. For services to the Staging of the London 2012 Olympic and Paralympic Games.
- Dr. Peter Julian Ruback, lately Deputy Director, Housing Revenue Account and Decent Homes Programme, Department for Communities and Local Government. For services to Council Housing Reform.
- Timothy Peter Sands, Deputy Director, NHS Pay, Pensions and Employment Services, Department of Health, Leeds. For services to the Reform of the National Health Service Pension Scheme.
- Su Joscelyne Sayer, OBE, Chief Executive, United Response. For services to People with Disabilities in the UK.
- Sarah Elizabeth Severn, Head, Public Order Unit, Crime and Policing Group, Home Office. For services to Public Protection.
- Caroline Shaw, Chief Executive, The Christie Hospital NHS Foundation Trust. For services to the NHS.
- David Richard Sheepshanks, Chair, St. George's Park. For services to Football and for charitable services in Suffolk.
- Dale Inez Simon, Director of Equality and Diversity, Crown Prosecution Service. For services to the Development of Equality and Diversity in the Crown Prosecution Service.
- Anthony John Smith, Director, UK Border Agency Olympics Programme, Home Office. For services to the Security of the London 2012 Olympic and Paralympic Games.
- Christopher John Addison Smith, Chief of Staff, Lambeth Palace. For services to the Church of England.
- Philip Smith, National Secretary, Association of Conservative Clubs. For political service.
- Martin Coulson Spray, Chief Executive, Wildfowl and Wetlands Trust. For services to Nature Conservation.
- Marie Staunton, Chief Executive, PLAN UK. For services to International Humanitarian Aid.
- Caroline Tapster, lately Chief Executive, Hertfordshire County Council. For services to Local Government.
- Michael Terrett, Chief Operating Officer, Rolls-Royce plc. For services to UK Engineering.
- John Francis Mathieson Tesh, lately Deputy Director, Civil Contingencies Secretariat, Cabinet Office. For services to UK Civil Resilience and the Development of the National Risk Assessment
- Stephen Visscher, Deputy Chief Executive and Chief Operating Officer, Biotechnology and Biological Sciences Research Council. For services to the Support of Scientific Research.
- Leslie Howard Walton, OBE, lately Chair, the Young People's Learning Agency. For services to Education.
- Commodore William Walworth OBE, Royal Fleet Auxiliary
- Johanna Elizabeth Martin Waterous, Venture Capital Investor. For services to Supporting Business Growth.
- David Russell Weir, MBE, Wheelchair Athlete. For services to Athletics.
- Paul Stephen Westbury, Chief Executive Officer, Buro Happold. For services to Engineering and Construction.
- Roger Hugh Williams, Member of Parliament for Brecon and Radnorshire. For public and political service.
- Dr. Marian Wilson, Deputy Director, Campaigns, Risk and Intelligence Service, Sheffield, HM Revenue and Customs. For services to Increasing Tax Revenue through Innovative National Schemes.
- Eleri Catherine Wones, Deputy Director, Treasury Solicitor's Department. For Legal services to the London 2012 Olympic and Paralympic Games.

==== Officers of the Order of the British Empire (OBE) ====
Military Division

- Lieutenant Colonel Barry William Bennett MBE, Royal Regiment of Artillery
- Captain Andrew Betton RN
- Wing Commander Roderick Alexander Boundy
- Lieutenant Colonel Ian Miles Comerford, Corps of Royal Electrical and Mechanical Engineers
- Wing Commander Roderick John Dennis
- Commander Nicholas Geoffrey Dunn
- Wing Commander Christopher John Fisher (RAF Volunteer Reserve (training))
- Lieutenant Colonel Nicholas John Grace
- Lieutenant Colonel Robert James Healey, Royal Corps of Signals
- Colonel Garry Hearn, late Royal Corps of Signals
- Commander Timothy Mark Hulme
- Surgeon Commander Anthony Wayne Lambert
- Lieutenant Colonel Peter Michael Little, the Royal Regiment of Scotland
- Group Captain Michael Dawson Lavender
- Group Captain James Cameron Mcgregor Johnston
- Colonel Nicholas Charles Tristram Millen, late the Royal Dragoon Guards
- Wing Commander Justine Elizabeth Morton
- Lieutenant Colonel Timothy Marc Piers Mountford, Intelligence Corps
- Lieutenant Colonel Robin Charles Smith, the Royal Logistic Corps
- Colonel Roger John Nathaniel Stewart, late Corps of Royal Engineers
- Commodore James Mark Slawson
- Lieutenant Colonel Simon Philip Stockley, Corps of Royal Engineers
- Lieutenant Colonel Neil Unsworth, the Duke of Lancaster's Regiment
- Wing Commander Stephen Michael Robert Ward MBE
- Commodore Richard William Mason
- Colonel Murray Courtenay Whiteside MBE, late Army Air Corps

Civil Division

- Richard Aird – Headteacher, Barrs Court School, Herefordshire. For services to Special Educational Needs.
- Shahnaz Ali – Senior Lead in Equality and Diversity, NHS North West. For services to Equality and Diversity.
- Jessica Annison – Policy and Delivery Lead, Olympic Security Directorate, Home Office. For services to the London 2012 Olympic and Paralympic Games.
- Dr. Lisa Appignanesi – For services to Literature.
- Max Arthur – Oral and Military Historian. For services to Military History.
- Prof. Derek William Aviss – lately Executive Director and Joint Principal, Trinity Laban Conservatoire of Music and Dance. For services to Higher and Music Education.
- Deborah Leek-Bailey – Headteacher, Babington House School, Bromley, Kent, and Member of the Independent/State Schools Partnership Forum. For services to Education.
- David William Baker – Chief Executive, Robust Details Limited. For services to the Construction Industry.
- Janet Balyckyi – Radiotherapy Services Director, The Royal Marsden Hospital NHS Foundation Trust. For services to Cancer Care and Radiography.
- John Charles Fiddian Barwell – lately President, National Conservative Convention. For political service.
- Prof. Ian Bateman – Professor of Environmental Science and Economics, University of East Anglia. For services to Environmental Science and Policy.
- Prof. Mary Beard – Professor of Classics, University of Cambridge. For services to Classical Scholarship.
- Dr. Rodney Berman – lately Leader, Cardiff City Council. For services Local Government and the community in Cardiff.
- Michael Billington – Theatre Critic The Guardian. For services to the Theatre.
- Anne Eileen Bleasdale – Headteacher, Laneshaw Bridge Primary School, Lancashire. For services to Education.
- Wendy Suzanne Blundell – Head, Devolved Regions, Institution of Civil Engineers. For services to the Construction Industry in Northern Ireland.
- Paul Booth – President, SABIC UK Petrochemicals. For services to the Chemical Process Industry.
- William Bordass – Building Scientist. For services to the Architectural and Engineering Professions and Sustainable Development.
- Fleur Bothwick – Director of Diversity and Inclusiveness, Ernst and Young. For services to Inclusion and Diversity in the Workplace.
- David Brace – Chairman, Dunraven Group Ltd. For services to Business and to charities in Bridgend.
- Prof. Martin Bradley – lately chief nursing officer. For services to Nursing in Northern Ireland and the UK.
- George James Brechin – lately Chief Executive, NHS Fife. For services to the NHS.
- Janet Susan Bridges – Principal, Castle View Enterprise Academy, Sunderland. For services to Education.
- Annette Lesley Brooke, MP – Member of Parliament for Mid Dorset and North Poole. For public and political service.
- Prof. Michael Brookes – Senior Manager B, H.M.P. Grendon. For services to H.M. Prison Service and the Care of Prisoners.
- Christine Browne – managing director, Thomson Airways. For services to Aviation.
- David Bucknall – Chair of the Board, Royal Institution of Chartered Surveyors, Global Construction and Quantity Surveying. For services to the Construction Industry.
- James Bulley – Director of Venues and Infrastructure and the Olympic Park, LOCOG. For services to the London 2012 Olympic and Paralympic Games.
- Rosemary Margaret Burden – Co-Founder, Coroners' Courts Support Service. For services to the Bereaved.
- Diane Helen Burleigh – chief executive officer, Chartered Institute of Legal Executives. For services to the Legal Profession.
- Nica Burns – Theatre Producer and Owner. For services to Theatre.
- John Burton – Director of Development, Westfield and director, Westfield Stratford City. For services to Urban Regeneration and to the London 2012 Olympic and Paralympic Games.
- Jabeer Karim Butt – Deputy Chief Executive, Race Equality Foundation. For services to Health Equality.
- Prof. John Butt – Gardiner Professor of Music, University of Glasgow. For services to Music in Scotland.
- Christopher Bywater – Head, Security and Business Continuity, Department for Work and Pensions. For service to Government Security Policy and for charitable service.
- Catherine Thompson Caithness – President, World Curling Federation. For services to Curling and International Disability Sport.
- Henry Murray Campbell – lately Senior Superintendent, Royal National Mission to Deep Sea Fishermen. For services to the Welfare of Fishermen in Scotland.
- Dr. Sarah Anne Geraldine Carville, JP – For services to Historical Geography and the community in Northern Ireland.
- Susan Chalkley – Chief Executive, Hastoe Housing Association. For services to Housing and Tenants.
- Ann Chance – For services to the voluntary and charitable giving in the United Kingdom.
- Ahmed Choonara – board member, Network for Black Professionals. For services to Further Education.
- Duncan Clark – CEO, BDA China Limited. For services to British commercial interests in China.
- Howard Paul Collins – For services to the London 2012 Olympic and Paralympic Games and London Underground.
- Rosamund Comins – Founder and Trustee, The Voice Care Network UK. For services to Education.
- Dr. Ryan Stephen Connor – chief executive officer and Founder, National Centre for Domestic Violence. For services to the Victims of Domestic Violence.
- Jennifer Ann Cooke, JP – For services to Music Theatre and the community in Northern Ireland.
- Margaret Cowie – For charitable services to Blind and Sight Impaired People.
- Robert Crawley – Head of Health and wellbeing, Metropolitan Police. For services to the Police Occupational Health Services.
- Dean Creamer – Deputy Head, UK Wide Operations, Government Olympic Executive. For Preparatory services to the London 2012 Olympic and Paralympic Games.
- Deborah Jane Dance – Director, Oxford Preservation Trust. For services to Heritage.
- Juliet Sarah Davenport – Founder and Chief Executive, Good Energy Group plc. For services to Renewable Electricity Supplies.
- Alice Mary Davidson – Volunteer, Volunteer Missionary Movement. For services to International Humanitarian Aid.
- Richard Llewellyn Davies – lately Chief Executive, Preston Road New Deal for Communities. For services to the Regeneration of Preston Road and to the community in the City of Hull.
- Susan Davies – Headteacher, Cynffig Comprehensive School, Bridgend. For services to Education.
- Shelagh Fay Deadman – lately Children and Young People's Inspection Team Leader, H.M. Inspector of Prisons. For services to Safeguarding Young People.
- Michael Henry Denness – President, Kent County Cricket Club. For services to Sport.
- Pauline Donleavy – Registrar, Employment Appeal Tribunal, H.M. Court and Tribunal Service. For services to the Employment Appeal Tribunal and Employment Law Development.
- Gillian Donnelly – North East, Head, Forensic Management, West Yorkshire Police. For services to Forensic Investigation of Serious Crime.
- Diana Donovan – For voluntary service to The Gurkha Welfare Trust.
- Jacqueline Anne Brock-Doyle – Director of Communications and Public Affairs, LOCOG. For services to the London 2012 Olympic and Paralympic Games.
- David Grant Downie – Head, Sports Medicine, Manchester City Academy. For services to Physiotherapy in Sport and to Young People.
- Paul John Downie – Deputy Director, Affordable Housing Management and Standards, Department for Communities and Local Government. For services to Social Housing Reform.
- Theresa Ann Drowley – Principal and chief executive officer, Redbridge College. For services to Further Education.
- Frances Theresa Duffy – Head, Ceremonials Unit, Department for Culture, Media and Sport. For public service to the Royal Wedding and Diamond Jubilee.
- Jacqueline Anne Duncan – Founder and Principal, Inchbald School of Design. For services to Interior Design.
- William Howard Robert Durie – For services to the community in Bristol.
- Timothy Patrick Elms – Parliamentary Clerk, Department of Health. For services to Improving Ministerial Business Standards.
- Pauline Etkin – chief executive officer, Nordoff Robbins. For service to Music Therapy.
- Jennifer Anne Evans – Head of Region for Eurasia, Latin America and the Caribbean, Tearfund. For services to International Humanitarian Aid.
- Walker George Ewart – Inspector (Grade 6), Education and Training Inspectorate. For services to Education.
- George Fairgrieve – Manager, Food Safety/Health and Safety, East Lothian Council and Chair, Scottish Food Enforcement Liaison Committee. For services to Consumer Protection.
- Dipak Kumar Fakey – For services to Education and to Community Cohesion in Leicester.
- Simon Hew Dalrymple Fanshawe – Chair of Council, University of Sussex. For services to Higher Education.
- Eleanor Henta Fazan – Choreographer and Director. For services to Dance.
- Prof. Katherine Fenton – Chief Nurse, University College Hospitals London NHS Foundation Trust. For services to Nursing.
- Alistair George Finlay – Assistant Chief Constable, Police Service of Northern Ireland. For services to Policing in Northern Ireland.
- Sheila Margaret Fleet – Jewellery Designer, Sheila Fleet Orkney Designer Jewellery. For services to the Jewellery Industry.
- Francesca Fonseca – lately Corporate Parenting Manager, Oxfordshire County Council. For services to Children and Families.
- Leueen Fox – Head, Office of the Senior President Tribunals, H.M. Courts and Tribunals Service. For services to Tribunal Reform.
- Christopher Fraser – lately Member of Parliament for South West Norfolk and Chair, Conservative Alumni Network. For public and political service.
- Philip Neville French – Film Critic, The Observer. For services to Film.
- Anthea Dolman Gair – Ministry of Defence. For services to Defence Acquisition.
- Anne Ganley – managing director, Thompson's Builders' and Plumbers' Merchants. For services to the Builders' Merchants Industry and to charity.
- Katie Gardiner – Policy Lead, Accreditation Project, Office for Security and Counter Terrorism, Home Office. For services to the security of the London 2012 Olympics and Paralympics.
- Christopher Garnett – board member, Olympic Delivery Authority and Chair, Olympic Transport Board. For services to the London 2012 Olympic and Paralympic Games.
- Polly Gibb – Director, Women in Rural Enterprise. For services to Rural Enterprise.
- Prof. Susan Elizabeth Gibson – Professor of Chemistry, Imperial College, London. For services to Chemistry and Science Education.
- Rabbi Herschel Gluck – Founder, Muslim-Jewish Forum. For services to Interfaith Understanding.
- Dr. Jonathan Godfrey – Principal, Hereford Sixth Form College. For services to Education.
- Prof. Brian William Golding – Scientific Fellow, Meteorological Office. For services to Weather Forecasting and the Prediction of Hazardous Weather.
- Dr. Clive Lester Grace – lately Chair, Local Better Regulation Office. For services to Business and voluntary service to Communities.
- Elizabeth Grant – lately Deputy Chair, Board of Trustees, Stonewall. For services to Lesbian, Gay, Bisexual and Transgender Equality in the UK Workplace.
- Ian Greenwood – lately Leader, Bradford City Council. For services to Local Government.
- Felicity Marion Greeves – Principal, Blackpool Sixth Form College. For services to Education.
- Keith John Griffin – Musician. For services to Music in Wales.
- Dr. Keith David Griffiths – lately Director of Therapies and Health Sciences, Betsi Cadwaladr University Health Board. For services to the NHS in Wales.
- Prof. Judith Elizabeth Hall – Chair, Critical Care Alliance and Founder, Mothers of Africa. For services to Academic Anaesthetics and Charitable services in Africa.
- Eileen Hallissey – Head of Accounting, Finance, Planning and Performance, Department for Business, Innovation and Skills. For services to Government Finance.
- Prof. David John Hand – Senior Research Investigator, Imperial College, London. For services to Research and Innovation.
- Dr. William Geoffrey Harris – Chair, NHS South of England. For services to the NHS.
- Richard Thomas Hartman – Head of Financial Control, Government Olympic Executive. For services to the London 2012 Olympic and Paralympic Games and voluntary service to the Museum Sector.
- Edward Augustus Hayward – Entrepreneur. For services to Business and to charities in Wales.
- Darren Richard Henley – managing director, Classic FM. For services to Music.
- James Hepburn – For services to Defence.
- Dr. Peter Higson – lately Chief Executive, Healthcare Inspectorate Wales, Welsh Government. For services to Health, Education and support for Veterans.
- Erica Hill – Support Worker, Catch-Up Charity Ltd. For services to Children and Young People.
- Richard Alexander Hill – Project Manager, Individuals and Public Bodies, Birmingham. For services to H.M. Revenue and Customs and voluntary service with Homeless People and Young Offenders.
- Michael David Hirst – lately Headteacher, Ravenscliffe High School and Sports College, Halifax. For services to Education.
- Bernard Peter Hollywood – For charitable services.
- Andrew Douglas-Home – lately Chair, Tweed Commissioners and the River Tweed Foundation. For services to Fishing and to Scottish Heritage through the Abbotsford Trust.
- Prof. David Kenneth Howe – Emeritus Professor of Social Work, University of East Anglia. For services to Vulnerable Children and Families.
- Dr. Robert Charles Hubrecht – Deputy Scientific Director, Universities Federation for Animal Welfare. For services to Animal Welfare.
- Alison Humberstone – Policy Team Leader, Private Pensions Directorate, Department for Work and Pensions. For services to Tackling Youth Unemployment and to charitable Fundraising.
- Christopher Hurran – For services to Defence.
- Peter William Hutley, MBE – For charitable services and services to Christian Understanding.
- Dr. Keith Thomas Ison – Head of Medical Physics, Guy's and St. Thomas's NHS Foundation Trust. For Leadership and Development in Healthcare Science, Medical Physics, Engineering and Technology.
- Steven Terence Jackson – Founder and Chief Executive, Recycling Lives. For services to Employment and the community in Lancashire.
- Suzanne Jacob – Head, Identify and Disrupt Programme, Office for Security and Counter Terrorism, Home Office. For services to the London 2012 Olympic and Paralympic Games.
- Susan Maria Jenkins – Headteacher, St. Joseph's Roman Catholic High School, Newport, South Wales. For services to Education.
- Margaret Pilar Johnson – Group chief executive officer, Leagas Delaney. For services to the Creative Industries Sector and voluntary services.
- Nichola Johnson – For services to Museums and Cultural Heritage.
- Richard Johnson – Head, Scientific Services, Bedfordshire Police. For services to Policing.
- Audrey Therese Ardern-Jones – Associate Lecturer, The Royal Marsden NHS Foundation Trust. For services to Cancer Genetics Nursing Care.
- Jennifer Mary Gray Jones – For services to the community in Bognor Regis, West Sussex.
- Dr. Bryan Keating – Entrepreneur. For services to Economic Development in Northern Ireland.
- Carleen Tina Kelemen – Director, Convergence Partnership Office for Cornwall and the Isles of Scilly. For services to Social Justice and Economic Inclusion.
- Roger Kelly – lately Chief Executive, Gateshead Council. For services to Local Government and the community in Gateshead and the North East.
- Sarah Kennett – Operations Cluster Manager, Benefit Integrity, Benefit Centres Directorate. For services to the Delivery of Benefits and to charity.
- Paul Kinkead – Head of Environment and Protection, Michelin Tyres plc. For services to Environmental Protection in Northern Ireland.
- Monika Kinley – Art Dealer and Artists' Agent. For services to the Visual Arts.
- George Alexander Bryson Kynoch – lately Deputy chairman, Scottish Conservative Party. For public and political service.
- Christina Lamb – Foreign Correspondent. For services to Journalism.
- Walter Edward Jim Leftwich – Trustee and Deputy chairman, National Association of Clubs for Young People. For services to Young People.
- Adrian Anthony Lester – Actor. For services to Drama.
- Prof. Howard Laurence Liddell – Co-Founder, Scottish Ecological Design Association. For services to Ecological Design and charity.
- Dr. Marian Frances Liebmann – For services to Social Justice through Art Therapy and Mediation in Bristol and Overseas.
- John Jeremy Lloyd – Screenwriter. For services to British Comedy.
- Alexander William Macbeth – Chief Executive, Textile Centre of Excellence. For services to Learning and Skills.
- Sunaina Mann – Principal, North East Surrey College of Technology. For services to Further Education.
- Stella McCartney – Fashion Designer. For services to Fashion.
- Gordon Lamont McCormack – Chair, Scottish Disability Sport. For services to the Special Olympics and Disability Sport.
- Ewan McGregor – Actor. For services to Drama and Charity.
- Anne Christine McKillop – Assistant Director, Financial Compliance, UK Border Agency, Home Office. For services to the Asylum Population.
- Dr. Robert McManners, DL – For services to the Heritage of the North East and to the community in Bishop Auckland, County Durham.
- Rodney Melville – lately Secretary, the Chequers Trust. For services to Architecture.
- Lynne Middleton – Head, Strategy, MI And Performance, Human Resources, Department for Work and Pensions. For services to Tackling Youth Unemployment.
- Dr. Vincent Mifsud – Head of Technology (Europe), Cobham plc. For services to the Defence Industry.
- Therese Miller – General Counsel, LOCOG. For services to the London 2012 Olympic and Paralympic Games.
- Eileen Moir – lately Executive Director of Nursing, Health Improvement Scotland. For services to Nursing and Healthcare.
- Audrey Margaret Mooney – Governor, H.M. Prison Aberdeen, Scottish Prison Service. For services to the Scottish Prison Service.
- Leslie Morgan – For services to the Pharmaceutical Industry and to charity.
- Julie Cheryl Mudd – Headteacher, Ivel Valley Special School, Bedfordshire. For services to Education.
- Geoffrey Charles Munn – For services to charitable giving in the UK.
- David Munns – Chair, Board of Governors, Nordoff-Robbins Music Therapy. For services to the Music Industry and charity.
- Paul Murphy – Chairman, Greater Manchester Police Authority. For services to Policing.
- Andy Murray – For services to Tennis
- Patricia Myers – Registrar, Royal Academy of Dramatic Art. For services to Higher Education.
- Keith Nancekievill – lately Headteacher, Hinchingbrooke School, Huntingdon, Cambridgeshire. For services to Education.
- Caroline Neville – lately Executive Director, Skills Funding Agency. For services to Further and Higher Education and the Skills Sector.
- Frantis̃ek Jan Nevrkla – Chair, Phonographic Performance Limited. For services to the British Music Industry.
- Paul David Newman – For services to voluntary organisations in the UK.
- Olive Newton – For services to Equality and Human Rights Issues and to the community in Neath, Port Talbot.
- John Nicholson – lately Project Sponsor and Programme Executive, Olympic Delivery Authority. For services to the London 2012 Olympic and Paralympic Games.
- Paul Thomas Noon – general secretary, Prospect. For services to Employment Relations and Sustainable Development.
- Cllr Melvyn Ernest John Nott – Leader, Bridgend County Borough Council. For services to the community and to Local Government.
- Margaret Ann Nowell – Headteacher, St. Thomas's Centre Pupil Referral Unit, Blackburn with Darwen Council. For services to Education.
- Dr. Robert Harvey Oakley – For services to Health, Sport and Charity in Bedford.
- Edwina Judith Simpson Olby – For services to the Riding for the Disabled Association in Yorkshire.
- Ian James O'Neill – Legacy Policy Manager, Government Olympic Executive. For services to the Legacy of the London 2012 Olympic and Paralympic Games.
- Dr. Miles Michael Parker – Director, Strategic Evidence and Analysis, Department for Environment, Food and Rural Affairs. For services to Improving Government Science.
- Margaret Edwards-Parton – Sector Skills Specialist, PA Consulting. For services to the Life Sciences Industry.
- Anna Payne – Weymouth and Portland Manager, UK Wide Operations, Government Olympic Executive. For services to the London 2012 Olympic and Paralympic Games.
- David Peacop – Head of Logistics, CLM. For services to the London 2012 Olympic and Paralympic Games.
- Julia, Lady Pender – For services to the community in Kent.
- David Charles Penlington – Ministry of Defence. For services to the Armed Forces particularly in Support of Afghanistan Operations.
- Gerry Pennell – chief information officer, LOCOG. For services to the London 2012 Olympic and Paralympic Games.
- Tracey April Pickin – Assistant Director, Public Bodies Group, H.M. Revenue and Customs. For services to Tax Compliance.
- Isobel Anne Poole – lately Sheriff. For services to Justice in Scotland and the community in Edinburgh.
- Prof. David Porteous, FRSE – Professor of Human Genetics and molecular Medicine, University of Edinburgh. For services to Science.
- Dr. Wyn Price – Head of Emergencies, Welsh Government. For services to Civil Contingency and Emergency Planning in Wales.
- Alan Poyner Pritchard – lately Headteacher, Cyfarthfa High School, Merthyr Tydfil. For services to Education in Wales.
- James I. Prosser – Personal Chair in Microbiology, University of Aberdeen. For services to Environmental Science.
- Daphne Vivienne Pullen – Chair, CLIC Sargent. For charitable services.
- Colonel Sylvia Nina Quayle, TD – For voluntary service to SSAFA Forces Help in Shropshire.
- Prof. Mala Rao – For services to Public Health in the UK and Overseas.
- Amanda Jayne Reddin – Head National Coach, British Gymnastics. For services to Sport.
- Stephen Regel – Principal Psychologist, NHS Nottingham. For services to Victims of Trauma.
- Dr. Richard Reid – Master Stone and Wood Carver. For services to Heritage and Restoration.
- Mervyn Richards – For services to Building Information Modelling and to the Construction Industry.
- Kathryn Elizabeth Riddle – Chair, NHS North of England and Pro-Chancellor, University of Sheffield. For services to the NHS and to Higher Education.
- Sue Riddlestone – Co-Founder, BioRegional. For services to Sustainable Business and to the London 2012 Olympic and Paralympic Games.
- Dr. Edward Bruce Ritson – Chair, Scottish Health Action on Alcohol Problems. For services to Alcohol Research.
- Ashley Hugh Roberts – Deputy Head, Automotive Unit, Department for Business, Innovation and Skills. For services to the UK Automotive Industry.
- Prof. Muriel Anita Robinson – Vice-Chancellor, Bishop Grosseteste University. For services to Higher Education.
- Andrew Michael Robson – For services to the game of Bridge and to Charity.
- Catherine Rock – Chair, Association of Forensic Radiography. For Services to Forensic Radiography.
- Alvar Nigel Rowe – President and chairman, Sail Training International. For services to charitable services.
- Richard Graham St. John Rowlandson – Philanthropist. For services to charity and to the community in Hertfordshire.
- Martin Sadler – Director of Cloud and Security Lab, Hewlett Packard Laboratories. For services to Science.
- Timothy James Sainsbury – Chair of Trustees, HomeStart UK. For services to Children and Families.
- John Francis Sanderson – For services to the Horseracing Industry.
- Prof. Bhupinder Kaur Sandhu – Professor of Paediatric Gastroenterology and Nutrition, Bristol Royal Hospital, South West. For services to Paediatric Medicine.
- Jennifer Saunders – Chief Executive, National Energy Action. For services to the Fuel Poor and voluntary service through the Chesshire Lehmann Fund.
- James Niall Scott – Founder, The Mark Scott Foundation. For services to Community Relations and Young People in Scotland.
- Patricia Scriven – Senior Manager, NOMS Headquarters. For services to H.M. Prison Service.
- Dr. Cynthia Kit Man Shaw – Ministry of Defence. For services to the Armed Forces particularly in Support of Libyan Operations.
- Denys Shortt – Founder, DCS Europe plc and lately Chair, Coventry and Warwickshire Local Enterprise Partnership. For services to the Economy in the West Midlands.
- Teresa Sienkiewicz – Director, KPMG. For services to the Accountancy and Pensions Professions.
- Antony George Sims – Director, 2012 Delivery, UK Trade and Investment, Department for Business, Innovation and Skills. For services to Industry through the British Business Embassy
- Graham Coleman-Smith – For services to the Voluntary and Charitable Giving Sector in the United Kingdom.
- Michael Smith – Chief Executive and managing director, Titanic Quarter Ltd. For services to Economic Development and Urban Regeneration in Belfast.
- Christopher Burnaby Starr – Chair, Forestry Regulation Task Force. For services to British Forestry and Forestry Education.
- Norma Stephenson – President, UNISON and Member, National Executive Committee, Labour Party. For public and political service.
- Moira Elizabeth Tattersall – Principal, Carlisle College. For services to Further Education.
- Carol Taylor – Director of Development and Research, National Institute of Adult Continuing Education. For services to Adult Learning.
- Cllr Sharon Taylor – Leader, Stevenage Borough Council and Deputy Chair, Local Government Association. For services to Local Government.
- Prof. Sandra Thomas – Head of Foresight, Government Office for Science. For services to Government Science Policy.
- Jane Clare Todd – Chief Executive, Nottingham City Council. For services to Local Government in Nottingham.
- Prof. Janet Todd – President, Lucy Cavendish College, University of Cambridge. For services to Higher Education and Literary Scholarship.
- Jean Veronica Tomlin – Director of Human Resources, Workforce and Accreditation, LOCOG. For services to the London 2012 Olympic and Paralympic Games.
- Christopher Townsend – Commercial Director, LOCOG. For services to the London 2012 Olympic and Paralympic Games.
- Prof. Janet Treasure – Psychiatrist, Eating Disorder Unit, London Maudsley Hospital NHS Foundation Trust. For services to People with Eating Disorders.
- Michael Cyril Truran – For voluntary services to Bioscience.
- Catherine Grace Turner – lately Consultant Forensic Scientist, Forensic Science Service. For services to the Criminal Justice System and the Victims of Crime.
- Wilfred Ainsworth Walker – For services to the Promotion and Development of live Black Music.
- Kevin Waller – Senior Avoidance Investigator, Anti-Avoidance Group, H.M. Revenue and Customs. For services to Tax Compliance and the Tax Profession.
- Lesley Margaret Walter – Headteacher, Philip Green Memorial School and Governor, Middle School, Wimborne, Dorset. For services to Special Educational Needs.
- Nicholas George Warren – For services to the voluntary sector in the United Kingdom.
- Howard James Cowen Wells – Vice-Chair, Sport and Recreation Alliance. For services to Sport Administration.
- Michael Frederick Wells – Chair, Lochs and Glens Holidays. For services to the Tourism Industry and to charity.
- Cllr Clare Whelan, DL – Member, London Borough of Lambeth. For services to Local Government in London.
- Erica Whyman – Chief Executive, Northern Stage. For services to Theatre in the UK.
- Brett Harris Wigdortz – Chief Executive, Teach First. For services to Education.
- Prof. Richard David Wilding – Professor and Chair in Supply Chain Strategy, Cranfield School of Management. For services to Business.
- Prof. John David Williams – lately Professor of Medicine, Cardiff University. For services to Patients with Renal Disease in Wales.
- Andrew David Wiseman – For public and political service.
- Prof. Alan Richard Woodside – Director, Transport and Road Assessment Centre, University of Ulster. For services to Higher Education and Highway Engineering in Northern Ireland
- Andrew James Worthington, MBE – Chair, North West Steering Group, London 2012. For services to the London 2012 Olympic and Paralympic Games.
- Sylvia Yates – lately Executive Director, Sheffield City Region. For services to Sheffield City Region and Humber Regeneration.
- Robert Charles Yeomans – lately Headteacher, St. John's Primary School, Walsall. For services to Education.
- Joyce Young – Owner, By Storm Ltd. For services to the Textile Industry and the community in Glasgow.

Diplomatic and Overseas List

- Moses Olufemi Anibaba, Director and Cluster Leader West Africa, British Council Ghana. For services to UK cultural interests in West Africa.
- Richard John Vandeleur Beatty, British Honorary Consul, Arusha, Tanzania. For services to British interests in Tanzania.
- Ms Kate Ewart-Biggs, lately Regional Head, Middle East and North Africa, Sub Saharan Africa and South Asia British Council. For services to UK cultural interests.
- Henry David Bolton, Stabilisation Team Leader, Provincial Reconstruction Team, Helmand, Afghanistan. For services to international security and stabilisation.
- Michael Denzil Carn, lately Committee Member, Commercial Anglo-Dutch Society. For services to British business, culture and charity work in the Netherlands.
- Duncan Lewis John Clark, lately Chairman, British Chamber of Commerce in China. For services to British commercial interests in China.
- Jennifer Louise, Mrs. Cole, First Secretary, Foreign and Commonwealth Office. For services to kidnap resolution.
- James Robert Philip Collins, First Secretary, Foreign and Commonwealth Office. For services to UK Consular interests.
- Trina, Mrs. Davies, Managing Director, Fil Anglo, Manila, The Philippines. For services to British commercial interests in The Philippines.
- Ms Tacita Charlotte Dean, Visual Artist. For services to British Art overseas.
- Leonard Norman Ebanks, J.P., Member, Anti- Corruption Commission, Cayman Islands. For services to economic development and to the community in the Cayman Islands.
- William John Eldred Evans, lately Counsellor, British Embassy, Bucharest, Romania. For services to UK interests in Romania.
- John Justin Felice, lately Assistant Commissioner of Police and Head of Anti-Corruption Branch, Jamaica Constabulary Force. For services to UK and Jamaican national security.
- Eleanor Mary, Mrs. Fuller, lately UK Permanent Representative, Council of Europe, Strasbourg, France. For services to human rights and diplomacy.
- Philip Tulloch Gibb, lately President, British Chamber of Commerce, Japan. For services to British business in Japan.
- Leslie Green, lately Assistant Commissioner of Police and Head of Crime, Jamaica Constabulary Force. For services to UK and Jamaican national security.
- Simon Anthony Greenall, Textbook writer. For services to English language teaching.
- Alistair James Harris, Director, Pursue Ltd. For services to promoting stability in the Lebanon and Middle East region.
- Neil Marius Jacobsen, Counsellor, British High Commission, Islamabad, Pakistan. For services to UK interests in Pakistan.
- Ms Lucy Rebecca Joyce, lately Head, London 2012 Unit, Foreign and Commonwealth Office. For services to London 2012 Olympic and Paralympic Games.
- David Harry Kustow, lately Chair, UK Jewish Film. For services to film in the UK and British/Israeli Film Co- operation.
- Jeffrey Larkin, Director Power and Water Middle East, Parsons Brinckerhoff, Abu Dhabi, UAE. For services to reconstruction in Iraq.
- Anthony John Lawrence, Member, Advisory Committee, International Social Service, Hong Kong. For services to the community in Hong Kong.
- Lillian Estelle, Mrs. Swann-Misick, lately Chair, Consultative Forum, Turks and Caicos Islands. For services to the reform of the administration of the Turks and Caicos Islands.
- Daniel Edward Salbstein, lately Member, Great Britain- Russia Society. For services to promoting UK/Russia mutual understanding.
- Alison Kathleen, Mrs. Shalaby, Chief Executive Officer of Reunite. For services to the prevention and resolution of international parental child abduction.
- Leslie, Mrs. Simpson, Founder, Roundabout Charity Distribution Store, Beijing, China. For services to charity and philanthropy in China.
- Martin John Stanford, lately Deputy Secretary General, International Institute for the Unification of Private Law, Rome, Italy. For services to the international unification of law.
- Professor Penelope Harriet Ur, lately Associate Professor, Oranim Academic College, and Board member, English Teachers Association, Israel. For services to English language teaching.
- Colin Cadell Wagstaff, Chairman, Kings World Trust for Children, South India. For services to education and young communities in southern India.
- Derek Antony Ruffel Walton, Legal Counsellor, Foreign and Commonwealth Office. For services to human rights and diplomacy.
- Louis Wink, C.P.M., lately Commissioner, Royal Gibraltar Police. For services to policing and to the community in Gibraltar.
- Thomas Rathmell Woodroffe, lately Head, Opportunities Team, London 2012 Unit, Foreign and Commonwealth Office. For services to London 2012 Olympic and Paralympic Games.
- Timothy Paul James Wright, President, British American Business Council, Los Angeles, USA. For services to British business interests in the USA.

==== Members of the Order of the British Empire (MBE) ====
Military Division

- Warrant Officer 1 Christopher Charles Attrill, Royal Irish Regiment Territorial Army
- Major Kenneth Harry Baker, Royal Logistic Corps
- Warrant Officer 1 (Abovewater Warfare Weapons) Paul Michael Stewart Barker Warfare Specialist
- Flight Lieutenant Timothy Alexander Barlow
- Commander Nigel David Bond
- Major Joanna Jane Brain, the Adjutant General's Corps (Staff And Personnel Support Branch)
- Chief Technician David Jeremy Briggs
- Bombardier Alexander Robert Buchanan, the Royal Regiment of Artillery
- Lieutenant Commander Christopher Paul Canning
- Squadron Leader Benjamin John Clark
- Warrant Officer Class 1 Robert James Collins, the Parachute Regiment
- Sergeant Benjamin David Crossley (RAF)
- Squadron Leader Glynis Mary Dean
- Lieutenant Colonel Andrew Jonathan Deans, the Adjutant General's Corps (Educational And Training Services Branch)
- Major Leigh James Drummond, Royal Regiment of Scotland
- Lieutenant Colonel Paul John Edwards, the Royal Logistic Corps
- Lieutenant Commander Damian Andrew Giles Exworthy
- Major Alastair Neil Field, The Rifles
- Major Darren John Fisher, Royal Logistic Corps
- Corporal (acting Sergeant) Terry John Fitzgerald, Royal Corps of Signals
- Captain Andrew James Fletcher, Intelligence Corps
- Warrant Officer Class 2 James Alexander Ford, the Adjutant General's Corps (Staff And Personnel Support Branch) Territorial Army
- Warrant Officer Kevin John Patrick Foxwell (RAF)
- Warrant Officer Class 2 Christopher James Fuller, Corps of Royal Engineers
- Lieutenant Commander Terence Gillard, Royal Naval Reserve (sea Cadet Corps)
- Major Frederick William Greenhow, Royal Regiment of Artillery
- Major Rowena Charlotte Griffiths, Adjutant General's Corps (Staff And Personnel Support Branch)
- Major Charles Edward Digby Grist, The Rifles
- Warrant Officer 1 (Abovewater Warfare Tactical) James Edward Hall Warfare Specialist
- Major Barry Heap, the Corps of Royal Engineers
- Lieutenant Commander Thomas Maxwell Philip Henderson
- Major Cameron Arthur Hill, Royal Logistic Corps Territorial Army
- Major Steven Robin Hook, Royal Logistic Corps
- Warrant Officer Class 2 Leslie John Hunt, Corps of Royal Engineers Territorial Army
- Squadron Leader Phillip Leslie Jones
- Squadron Leader Tal Thomas Adam Lambert
- Captain (acting Major) Christian Glyndwr Lamb, The Rifles
- Lieutenant Commander Rodney Leslie Lester
- Captain (acting Major) Guy William John Lock, Coldstream Guards
- Lieutenant Commander Brian Meadows
- Major Matthew John Frederick Middleditch QGM, the Royal Logistic Corps
- Lieutenant Colonel Stephen John Morgan, the Royal Corps of Signals
- Staff Sergeant Stuart Andrew Nash, Royal Corps of Signals Territorial Army
- Major Andrew James Parker, Royal Logistic Corps
- Lance Bombardier Benjamin James Parkinson, the Royal Regiment of Artillery
- Warrant Officer 1 Annette Eileen Penfold, Royal Naval Reserve
- Flight Sergeant Martin Alan Purvis
- Major Hemchandra Rai BEM, the Adjutant General's Corps (Gurkha Staff And Personnel Support Branch)
- Squadron Leader Simon Edward Reade
- Warrant Officer 1 David John Roach Royal Marines
- Major Fabian Andrew David Lechmere Roberts MVO, Irish Guards
- Lieutenant Colonel Brian Mackenzie Ross, the Royal Regiment of Scotland
- Warrant Officer 1 (Air Engineering Technician) David Alun Rowlands
- Major Robert Sadler, Royal Mercian And Lancastrian Yeomanry Territorial Army
- Captain Andrew James Sanger, Corps of Royal Engineers
- Major Mathew Timothy James Short, Corps of Royal Engineers
- Flight Sergeant Derek Charles Smith
- Chief Technician Barry John Stringer
- Warrant Officer 1 Simon Tottle Royal Marines
- Captain Martyn Jonathan Thompson, Royal Army Veterinary Corps
- Major Mark Lloyd Welham, The Royal Welsh
- Warrant Officer Paul Wheable (RAF)
- Captain Nicholas Simon Wilson, The Yorkshire Regiment
- Warrant Officer David John Woodhead (RAF)
- Flight Sergeant Dale Edward Spencer Woolman-Lane
- Major Kevin Young, Royal Regiment of Artillery Territorial Army

Civil Division

- Ruth Abrahams. For services to the voluntary and community sector in Newcastle upon Tyne.
- Nellie Turbyne Adjaye, Consultant Paediatrician, Maidstone, Kent. For services to Child Health and Protection.
- Neelam Aggarwal-Singh. For services to Community Cohesion, Health and Welfare through the Indian Hindu Welfare Organisation.
- Cherry Alexander, Head of International Competition, UK Athletics. For service to Sport.
- Robert James Alexander. For voluntary and community service in Northern Ireland.
- Colin Appleyard. For services to Motorcycle Sport.
- David Arnold, Chair, London Lay Observers Panel For Prisoner Escort and Custody Services. For services to the Criminal Justice System.
- John Arnold, President, English Schools Table Tennis Association and chairman, National Council for School Sport. For services to Schools Sport.
- Michael Newstead Arthur. For services to the community in Epsom and Ewell, Surrey.
- Connie Marguerite Baines. For services to the community in Bridgnorth, Shropshire.
- Susan Elizabeth Mary Balchin. For services to the community in Berkshire.
- Richard Kenneth Baldwin. For services to Sport and Recreation.
- Margaret Rose Stevenson Barker, Founder, Dorchester Poverty Action Group and The Hub. For services to Homeless and Underprivileged People in Dorchester.
- Valerie Barker. For services to the community of the Mixenden Social Housing Estate, Halifax.
- John Henry Barnes. For services to the community in Birmingham, West Midlands.
- June Rosemary Barnes. For services to the community in Frome, Somerset.
- John Batchelor, Illustrator. For services to Illustration.
- Brian Beale. Councillor, Southminster. For services to Local Government in Essex.
- David John Beardsall, Retained Watch Manager in Charge, Nottinghamshire and City of Nottingham Fire and Rescue Authority. For Services to Local Government.
- Thomas George Beech. For services to the community in North Staffordshire.
- Nicola Benedetti, Violinist. For services to Music and to charity.
- John Stanley Bourlet Bennett. For services to the community in Worcester.
- Cheryle June Berry. For services to Education, Health and charity in Lincolnshire and Derbyshire.
- Harold Kebir Berry. For services to the community in Pontefract, West Yorkshire.
- Tracey Berry. Family Support Teacher, Forthview Primary School, Edinburgh. For services to Education.
- Joyce Andree Best. For voluntary services to Young People in Ulster through Girl Guiding.
- Deborah Bestwick, Director, Oval House. For services to Drama.
- Colin Leonard Bird JP. For services to the communities in Eastleigh and Southampton, Hampshire.
- Timothy Arthur Bird, Social Fund Manager, Jobcentre Plus. For services to Jobseekers with Mental Health Issues and voluntary service to Seaview Primary School.
- John Theodore Blackburn, Founder and managing director, Canterbury Bears. For services to Manufacturing and Export.
- Pamela Beatrice Mary Blakeman, Local Historian. For services to Heritage in Ely, Cambridgeshire.
- Albert William Bleach. For services to the community in Nyewood, West Sussex.
- David Blower. For services to Tenant Engagement in Fleetwood, Lancashire.
- Anthony Boden, Prison Officer, HM Young Offenders' Institute, Feltham. For voluntary services to HM Prison Service and to Young People in Ealing.
- Alison Grace Borgese, Assistant Head, All Saints Junior School, Maidenhead, Berkshire. For services to Education.
- Michael Stanley Both, Director of Engineering and Technical Operations, Racetech. For services to the Economy.
- Charles Bryan Bottomley, Foster Carer and Adoptive Parent, Hull. For services to Children and Families.
- Patricia Bottomley, Foster Carer And Adoptive Parent, Hull. For services to Children and Families.
- Francis Christopher Bourne, lately non-executive director, Trinity House and chairman, Joint Strategic Board for the General Lighthouse Authorities. For services to the Maritime Industry.
- Helen Elisabeth Bowles, Policy Adviser and Deputy CEO, GuildHE. For services to Higher Education.
- Joanna Margaret Boyd, Women's Officer, Derry City Council. For services to Local Government in Northern Ireland.
- Jean Kathleen Ann Bradford, Founder, South Devon Seabird Trust. For services to Animal Welfare.
- David Bradley, Principal Officer, Northern Ireland Prison Service. For services to Vulnerable Prisoners and voluntary service to the Royal British Legion
- Francis Brady, managing director, La Mon Hotel and Country Club. For services to Tourism and Hospitality in Northern Ireland.
- Phelim John Joseph Brady, Deputy Principal, Farnborough College of Technology. For services to Further Education.
- John Arthur Brannigan, lately Director of Investigations, Historical Enquiries Team. For services to Policing and to the community in Northern Ireland.
- Peter Thomas Simmons Breene, Chair, Board of Governors, Finaghy Primary School. For voluntary service to Education in Northern Ireland.
- Colette Bridgman, Consultant in Dental Public Health, Manchester, North West England. For services to Dentistry and Oral Health.
- Richard John Brighton, Newsagent. For services to the News Delivery Trade.
- Peter Alan Brown, lately Assistant Principal International, Chichester College. For services to Further Education.
- Dorothy Mary Buchanan, Chair of Governors, The Blue Coat Church of England (Aided) Infant and Junior Schools' Federation, Walsall. For services to Education.
- Prof. Oscar Buneman FRS, Professor of Database Systems, University of Edinburgh. For services to Data Systems and Computing.
- Robert Ian Burn-Murdoch, Curator, Norris Museum. For services to the Heritage of St Ives, Cambridgeshire.
- John Burton DL. For political and voluntary service to the community in Sedgefield, Co Durham.
- John Geoffrey Burton. For services to Church Bell-ringing in North Staffordshire.
- Martin William Ledger Burton. For services to the Charity Sector in the West Midlands.
- Peter John Bury, Spectrum Project Director, Ofcom. For services to Spectrum and to the London 2012 Olympic and Paralympic Games.
- George Wentworth Butler, Dairy Farmer. For services to Agriculture and to charity.
- Ann Elizabeth Cable. For voluntary service to St. John Ambulance in London.
- Martin Edward Cahill. For services to the community in Earls Barton, Northamptonshire.
- William Andrew Cambridge, Chief Scientist, Communications and Integrated Systems, Ultra Electronics. For services to the Defence Industry.
- Vanessa Cameron, Chief Executive, Royal College of Psychiatrists, London. For services to Psychiatry.
- Daniel Douglas Kenneth Campbell, Master Whisky Distiller, Tomatin Distillery. For services to the Whisky Industry and to the community in Strathdearn, Inverness-shire.
- Elizabeth Emma Campbell. For voluntary services to Young People in Ulster through Girl Guiding and the Duke of Edinburgh Award Scheme.
- Gail Campbell. For voluntary service to the Royal British Legion with British Forces Germany.
- Sally Campbell-Gray. For services to the Riding for the Disabled Association.
- Sheila Carey. For services to Disability Athletics.
- Julian Carradice. For services to the Wasdale Mountain Rescue Team, Cumbria.
- Stamford James Cartwright TD. For voluntary service to the West Midland Reserve Forces and Cadets Association.
- Patricia Chalmers, Former Member, Glasgow City Council. For services to Built Heritage in Glasgow.
- John Thomas Chamberlain. For services to the community in Cemaes, Anglesey and in Indonesia.
- David George Robert Cherry, Composer and arranger, Boys' Brigade Marching Bands. For services to Children and Young People.
- James Alan Christie, Networks Resource Leader, East Scotland. For services to the Electricity Industry and Customers in Scotland.
- Winifred Joan Clark, Deputy Director-General, British Holiday and Home Parks Association. For services to Tourism.
- Colin Allen Roger Clarke. For charitable services through The Kilworth Challenge in Leicestershire.
- James Nicholas Clarke, Banqueting Operations Co-ordinator, Queen's University Belfast. For services to Higher Education in Northern Ireland.
- Jillian Carol Clarke. For services to the community in Sutton Benger, Wiltshire.
- Maureen Clarke, Founder, Angels of Hope. For services to People with Ovarian Cancer and their Families.
- David John Claxton LVO TD, Trustee, Together Trust and Hulme Educational Trust. For services to Education and Disadvantaged Young People in Manchester.
- Timothy Clayton, lately Specialist Scientific Adviser, Forensic Science Service. For services to the Criminal Justice System.
- June Cliffe. For services to the community in Sharlston, West Yorkshire.
- Penelope Jane Clough, Co-Founder, Justice For Jane Campaign. For services to the Victims of Violent Crime.
- Robert Emile Collins. For services to the Meanwood Valley Urban Farm and to the community in Leeds, Yorkshire.
- Jessie Colquhoun, lately Community Nurse, NHS Highland. For services to Healthcare in Ardnamurchan, Argyll.
- Anthony Ronald Coombes. For services to the community in Gillingham, Dorset.
- Daryll Charles Cooper, Honours Secretary, Department For Education. For services to the Department for Education and service to the community in Walthamstow.
- Robert Cooper, lately Co-ordinator, Penicuik First Responders. For voluntary service in Penicuik, Midlothian.
- Frederick Cordier, Master Ropemaker. For services to Ropemaking.
- Samuel Cordner, Superintendent, Police Service of Northern Ireland. For services to Policing and to the community in South Armagh.
- Ian (John) Craig, lately President, The Scottish Beekeepers Association. For services to Beekeeping.
- Francis Gibbs Crane, Head of Geography And Duke of Edinburgh's Co-ordinator, Stafford Grammar School. For services to Education.
- Robert Croft. For services to Cricket.
- Patrick Joseph Cronesberry, Founder and Chair, Middlesbrough Disabled Supporters Association. For services for disabled people in Sport and the community.
- Horace MacDonald Cross, For voluntary service to the Royal British Legion in Norfolk.
- John Locker Crosslé, Founder, Crosslé Car Company. For services to Engineering and Manufacturing in Northern Ireland.
- Julian Michael Crow, Regional Manager, West of England, First Great Western. For services to the Rail Industry.
- Christina Cullen, Player and Coach, Hightown Hockey Club. For services to Sport.
- Patricia Cumper, Playwright and Artistic Director, Talawa Theatre Company. For services to Black British Theatre.
- Patrick Curtis, Senior Officer, Specialist Investigations, Northern Ireland, HM Revenue and Customs. For services to Preventing Fuel Fraud.
- Carolyn Anne Darbyshire, District Commissioner, Chandlers Ford Scouts, Hampshire. For services to Young People.
- Marilyn Margaret Darg JP, Magistrate, North Somerset Bench. For services to the Administration of Justice.
- Eric Charles Darlow. For services to the UK Quarrying Industry.
- Gareth Wyn Davies, lately Clerk, Garw Valley Community Council. For public service and for services to the community in the Garw Valley, Bridgend.
- George Barrie Davies. For voluntary service to St. John Ambulance and the community in Macclesfield.
- Sally Jane Clarissa Davis, lately managing director, Growing Ambitions Community Interest Company (now part of 'Inspiring the Future'). For services to Young People.
- Rosalie Joan Dawes. For services to the community and to charity in Worcestershire.
- Gordon John Day. For voluntary services to Rowing and charitable services through the Allan Glen's School Club.
- Paul Denby DL JP. For services to the community in Greater Manchester.
- Jack Denness. For services to charity in Medway, Kent.
- Diana Isabel Dishley JP, Magistrate and Founder, Your Life You Choose. For services to the community in Ealing, West London.
- Elizabeth Joyce Doherty. For services to Nursing and Healthcare in Northern Ireland.
- Hamish Donaldson. For services to the community in Haslemere, Surrey.
- Torin Stuart Douglas. For services to the community in Chiswick, West London.
- Ian Dowling, lately Chief Assessor, Parliamentary Assessment Board of the Conservative Party. For political service.
- Mhairi McLeod Johnstone Doyle, DWP Operations. For services to Employment and Social Inclusion particularly of Street Workers.
- Agnes Dunne. For services to St. George's Park Retirement Village in Burgess Hill, West Sussex.
- Malcolm Dyer. For services to Defence.
- David William Edgington. For services to the Industrial Heritage of the Stationary Engine.
- Jennifer Susan Eitel, Chair, Boards of Governors, Dungannon Nursery and Sperrinview Special Schools. For services to Education in Northern Ireland.
- Ivy Myrle Ellis. For services to the WRVS at Leicester Royal Infirmary.
- Brigitte Engelien-Dawson. For services to the communities in Freshford and Bath.
- Barbara Evans, Team Leader for learning support workers within the Special Educational Needs curriculum, Carshalton College. For services to Further Education.
- Sheila Dorothy Evans, President, Great Oaks Hospice, Coleford. For charitable services.
- Christine Evans-Thomas, Founder, Bucketful of Hope Appeal. For charitable services to Cancer Patients in South and West Wales.
- Jennifer Ann Farmer. For services to the Magistracy in the South Lakeland Local Justice Area and to the communities of Skelmesbergh, Selside and Longsleddale in Cumbria.
- Gordon Anthony Farrel, Senior Executive Officer, DWP Operations. For public service and services to the community through Community Campus.
- Anis Faruki. For services to charity and to the community in Preston, Lancashire.
- Anthony Rowland Favell, Councillor and Chair, Peak District National Park Authority. For political and public service.
- Deborah Jill Fensome. For services to the community in Harpenden, Hertfordshire.
- David Andrew Fenton, Consultant Dermatologist, St. John's Institute of Dermatology, Guy's and St. Thomas's Hospitals, London. For services to the treatment of Skin and Hair Disorders.
- Oliver Michael Fenton, Consultant Plastic Surgeon, Pinderfields General Hospital, Wakefield, West Yorkshire. For services to Paediatric Plastic Surgery.
- Santosh ('Sandy') Fenwick, Senior Executive Officer, DWP Operations. For services to Jobseekers in West London.
- David Ferguson, Consultant Nurse (Learning Disabilities and Mental Health), Southern Health NHS Foundation Trust. For services to Nursing.
- Mervyn Ferris. For voluntary service to Young People in Co Down through the Scout Association.
- Jayne Sharon Field. For services to the Sleaford Concert Band and to the communities in Sleaford and North Kesteven, Lincolnshire.
- Stuart Field, Chairman, League of Friends, Kent and Canterbury Hospital, Kent. For services to the NHS.
- Martyn Gareth Finch. For services to the Cleveland Search and Gari Rescue Team in the North East.
- Kevin Findlater, Chief Inspector, Central Scotland Police. For services to the Environment and to the community in Loch Lomond and The Trossachs National Park.
- Tracey Joy Fisher. For services to Young People through The Duke of Edinburgh's Award in Wirral and to the community in Eastham, Merseyside.
- Kathleen Hilda Ford, Head of Corporate Information Management Department, Avon and Somerset Constabulary. For services to Information Management in Policing.
- Alan Foster, Chief Executive, North Tees and Hartlepool NHS Foundation Trust. For services to the NHS.
- Peter John Fowler, Market trader and Former President of the Covent Garden Market Tenants Association. For services to the Food and Catering Industries.
- Prof. Peter Fraenkel, Co-Founder and lately chief technical officer, Marine Current Turbines Ltd. For services to Marine Energy.
- Caryn Franklin, Fashion commentator and entrepreneur (founded All Walks Beyond The Catwalk). For services to Diversity in the Fashion Industry.
- Jacqueline Franklin, Foster Carer, Bristol. For services to Children and Families.
- John Alan Franklin, Foster Carer, Bristol. For services to Children and Families.
- David Fraser. For services to Health and to the community in the London Borough of Kingston upon Thames.
- Spencer William Freeman. For services to Music and the Arts in Eastbourne, East Sussex.
- Julie Fry, Police Inspector, Hampshire Constabulary. For services to Policing.
- Nicholas Fuller, Head of Education, LOCOG. For services to the London 2012 Olympic and Paralympic Games.
- Albert Furze, Education consultant and lately Headteacher, Bradstow Special Educational Needs School, Broadstairs, Kent. For services to Education.
- James Andrew Campbell Gairdner, lately Voluntary Chief Steward, Wimbledon. For services to Tennis.
- Mahendra Gajjar, Officer, Small and Medium Enterprises, London, HM Revenue and Customs. For services to Tax and Duty Fraud Prevention and to the community in Edgware
- Marjorie Galloway. For services to the community in Prestonon-Tees, Cleveland.
- Alison Game, lately Personal Assistant to the Clerk of the House of Commons. For public service.
- Ivy Winifred Gardiner. For services to Young People and to the community in Wirral, Merseyside.
- Martin Fraser Gardner, Programme Co-ordinator, International Conifer Conservation Programme. For services to Horticultural Conservation.
- Nigel Andrew Garfitt, Director of Villages And Games Services, LOCOG. For services to the London 2012 Olympic and Paralympic Games.
- Janet Marie Gaskell. For services to the Caribbean Carnival and to the community in Leicester.
- Brian Gates. For services to Interfaith Relations and to the Religious Education Council of England and Wales.
- Paul Dennis Gittins. For services to the community in Bewdley and as a Community First Responder in Worcestershire.
- David Glasenbury, Specialist Physical Education Adviser, National Police College, Bramshill. For services to Police Training.
- Helen Glover. For services to rowing.
- Jean Glynn, Children's Service Manager, Health Visiting and School Nursing, Stoke-on-Trent. For services to Healthcare.
- Andrea Goodwill, Course Leader, Cleveland College of Art and Design. For services to Further Education.
- Coral Lydia Gould, Singing teacher. For services to Music and the Arts.
- Janet Marie Gould, Volunteer, Greater Manchester Police. For services to the community in the Metropolitan Borough of Tameside.
- Christine Mary Goult, lately Head of Higher Education, Cleveland College of Art and Design. For services to Higher Education.
- Jennifer Elizabeth Graham, Assistant Speech and Language Therapist Manager, Belfast Health and Social Care Trust. For services to Speech and Language Therapy in Northern Ireland.
- Linda Green, Member, Gateshead Metropolitan Borough Council. For services to the community in Tyne and Wear.
- Catherine Greig, general manager, The Travelling Light Theatre Company. For services to Theatre for Young People in Bristol.
- Elaine Griffiths, Music Teacher, Stanley Primary School, Teddington. For services to Education.
- Peter Gross, Assistant Headteacher, Enfield Grammar School. For services to Education.
- Peter Grubb, Chair of Trustees, Nigeria Health Care Project. For services to Healthcare in Nigeria.
- James Norman Gundill. For services to Horseracing.
- Deborah Hale, Torch Relay Producer, LOCOG. For services to the London 2012 Olympic and Paralympic Games.
- [[Fiona Hall (politician)|Fiona Hall MEP]], Member of the European Parliament for North East England and leader, Liberal Democrat MEPs. For public and political service.
- Grace Hall, DWP Operations. For services to Youth Employment in the London Borough of Waltham Forest.
- Richard Hallett, Campaigner, maternity services. For services to Midwifery and Parents.
- Anita Halliday, Chief Executive, St. Paul's Community Development Trust. For services to the community in Balsall Heath, Birmingham.
- Thomas George Hugh Hanlon. For voluntary service to Young People in Co Armagh through the Boys' Brigade.
- Caroline Alberta Hansford, Founder, Malawi Education Link. For services to Primary Education in Malawi.
- Melissa Hardie-Budden. For services to Heritage and the Arts in West Cornwall.
- Andrew Darby Harris. For charitable services and for services to the community in Bromsgrove, Worcestershire.
- Susan Elizabeth Harrison, lately Director, British Aerosol Manufacturers' Association. For services to Industry and Safe Practices.
- Alan Hatton-Yeo, Chief Executive, the Beth Johnson Foundation. For services to Promoting Inter-generational Practice.
- Sarah Catherine Janet Hawken, Actuary, Model Development Unit, Strategy Directorate, DWP. For services to Social Security and the community in Surrey.
- Vincent Thomas Patrick Hayes, Founder, Brick Lane Music Hall. For services to British Music Hall.
- Terence James Heard, Co-Founder, UK Mathematics Trust. For services to the Teaching of Mathematics.
- Michael Henderson-Begg. For services to the City of London Corporation and to the community in London
- Mayer Hersh. For services to Holocaust Education.
- Amanda Heslop, Headteacher, The Wharf Nursery School and Children's Centre, Godalming, Surrey. For services to Education.
- David Thomas Hickey, Head of Olympic Park Venues and Infrastructure Delivery, LOCOG. For services to the London 2012 Olympic and Paralympic Games
- Donald Hickman. For services to the community in Albrighton, Shropshire.
- Elizabeth Higham. For services to Girlguiding in Bolton, Lancashire.
- Carol Ann Highton, Founder, Brian Shields Trust. For services to Personal Finance and Community Support.
- Anthony Hiles, Foster carer, Barnardo's Sandcastle Project, West Midlands. For services to Children and Families.
- Muriel Hiles, Foster carer, Barnardo's Sandcastle Project, West Midlands. For services to Children and Families.
- Deirdre Elizabeth Hilton, Former National President,[UK and Irish Dexter Society. For services to the conservation of Dexter cattle in Northern Ireland.
- Phillip Gyles Hodge, Administrative Officer, Central Casework Group, Driver and Vehicle Agency, Swansea, Department for Transport. For services to Reducing Transport Fraud.
- Timothy Mark Hodgson. For services to Mountain Rescue.
- Leslie Hoey. For services to charity in Scotland.
- James Michael Holyfield, lately Policy Manager, Alliance of Sector Skills Councils. For services to Apprenticeships.
- Jon Honeysett, Member, Kidsgrove Environmental Watch Response Group. For services to Rail in Kidsgrove.
- Philip Raymond Hopkins, Foster carer, Dorset County Council. For services to Children and Families.
- Wendy Una Hopkins, Foster carer, Dorset County Council. For services to Children and Families.
- Michael Hourahine, Security Manager, 70 Whitehall. For services to the Cabinet Office.
- Wilhelmina Elizabeth Houston, Staff Officer, College of Agriculture, Food and Rural Enterprise, Northern Ireland Executive. For services to Greenmount College and to the community in Ulster.
- Martin John Hovenden, Special Constable, Sussex Police. For services to Policing.
- Mark Hughes, lately chief executive officer, North West Regional Development Agency. For services to Business in the North West.
- Karen Hull, Personal Adviser, Norfolk Careers Service and Connexions Norfolk. For services to Education.
- Inderjeet Hunjan, Head of Access and Widening Participation Team, Leeds Metropolitan University. For services to Higher Education.
- Margaret Joy Hunter. For services to Age UK Surrey and to Charity.
- Charles Hutchison, Principal, Charles Hutchison Consulting. For services to Health and Safety in Northern Ireland.
- Sylvia Hyams. For services to charity and to the community in Storrington, West Sussex.
- Stephen Mark I'Anson, Entrepreneur and Pro-Chancellor, Newcastle University. For services to Entrepreneurship, Community Engagement and Higher Education.
- Stephanie Vernon Irons-Young, lately Provost, East Ayrshire. For services to Local Government and to charity.
- Christine Jackson, Girl Guide Leader, Crook, County Durham. For services to Children and Young People.
- Margaret Eileen Mary Jackson, Founder and Chair, North Somerset Masonic Widows' Association. For services to charity in North Somerset.
- Mahdi Mabruk Jibani, Consultant Physician, Ysbyty Gwynedd Hospital. For services to Medicine.
- Jeremy Jobson. For services to Defence.
- Ann Marjorie Johnson, Nurse Educator, lecturer and Alzheimer's campaigner. For services to Healthcare.
- Jillian Lesley Johnson, Artistic Director of Concerts, University of Leeds. For services to Higher Education and Music in Leeds.
- Kim Lorraine Johnson, Regional Delivery Manager, Criminal Justice System Efficiency Programme, Crown Prosecution Service. For services to Law and Order.
- Michael Johnson, Group Training Manager, Gelder Group. For services to Training and Skills.
- Pamela Lesley Johnston. For services to charity and to the community in Sutton Coldfield, West Midlands.
- Martin Hartley Jones, Chair, Policy Advisory Council, United Kingdom Accreditation Service. For services to Accreditation.
- Mary May Jones. For services to Tenants and to the community in Saffron and Neston, Leicester.
- Rosemary Diane Jones, lately non-executive director, NHS Herefordshire. For services to Healthcare.
- Tasha Jones, Head of Citizenship, Ulverston Victoria High School, Cumbria. For services to Education.
- Barbara Judge, Teacher Tutor, South Eastern Regional College. For services to Further Education in Northern Ireland.
- Marilyn Joy Kelly. For charitable services in Newton Abbott, Devon.
- Vera Elizabeth Kelso, Lead Midwife, The Southern Health and Social Care Trust. For services to Nursing in Northern Ireland.
- Carol Kempton, Head of Internal Events, 10 Downing Street. For services to the Prime Minister's Office.
- Michaela Butter Keon. For services to the Arts in the East Midlands.
- Adrian Killick, lately Youth Worker, Essex County Council. For services to Young People and voluntary service to the community in Walton-on-the-Naze, Essex.
- Frances Marian Kilner, Deputy Chair, Civil Service Lifeboat Fund and DWP Lifeboat Fund co-ordinator. For services to the Royal National Lifeboat Institution.
- Edmund Mervyn Bellamy King, Head of Newspaper Collection, British Library. For services to the British Library.
- Florence Mary Kirkby, Vice-Chairman, Association of School and College Leaders Associates Committee. For services to Education.
- Josephine Clare Kirkham. For services to the community in Rye, East Sussex.
- Jackson Kirtman-Brown, Scientist, Birmingham Women's Hospital. For services to Reproductive Medical Science.
- Judith Mary Kitching. For charitable services in Hutton Rudby, North Yorkshire.
- Lesley Knighton DL, Chief Guide Commissioner, Midlands Region. For services to Young People.
- Sally Ann Kynaston, Higher Officer, Project Co-ordinator, Programmes and Projects, Barnsley. For services to HM Revenue and Customs and to Girl Guiding in West Yorkshire South.
- Karen Lacey, London 2012 Nations And Regions Group Co-Ordinator for the South East, Government Olympic Executive. For services to the London 2012 Olympic and Paralympic Games.
- Graham John Lawrence, Ministry of Defence. For services to Defence.
- Sally Margaret Lee, Founder, Sara Lee Charitable Trust. For services to the community in Hastings, Rother and Rye.
- Dianne Margaret Leeman, Manager, Belfast City Tour Service, Belfast City Council. For services to Local Government and Tourism.
- Christine Leon, Head of Chinese Medicinal Plants Authentication and Conservation Centre, Royal Botanic Gardens, Kew. For services to the UK-China Science Relationship.
- Anne Lewis, Assistant District Commissioner, Charnwood District Scouts. For services to Children and Young People.
- Lucie-Jane Lewis. For services to the Charitable Giving Sector and to the Naomi House Hospice in Hampshire.
- Nicholas Lewis, lately Deputy Chief Executive, South West Regional Development Agency. For services to the Economy in the South West.
- Susan Rachel Lidington, Founder, Side By Side Theatre Company, Stourbridge. For services to People with Intellectual Disabilities.
- Anat Karen Liebreich. For services to Education and Horticulture Karen in West London.
- Geraldine Price Linford. For voluntary service to Young People in Northern Ireland through the Girl Guides and Millennium Volunteer Programme.
- Elizabeth Anne Littler. For services to Ice Skating.
- Elizabeth Littlewood, Head of Healthcare, HMP Full Sutton. For services to Healthcare in the Prison Service.
- Pauline Mercer Litton. For services to Genealogy and Family History.
- Derek Neil Louttit, Clinical Lead, Scottish Ambulance Service. For services to the Scottish Ambulance Service and the community in the West of Scotland.
- Gilly Love, Creative Director, Silver Programme, The Sage Gateshead. For services to Music in the community.
- Lawrence Daniel Lyle. For services to Archaeology and Local History through the Kent Archaeological Society.
- Donald Albert Mabey. For voluntary service to the Royal Air Forces Association.
- John Robert Mackenzie TD. For voluntary service to St. John Ambulance in Northumbria.
- Mamie MacLeod. For voluntary services to Save the Children, Stornoway.
- Nigel Main, Head of Special Project Solutions, Selex Elsag. For services to the Defence Industry.
- Hariprakash Mamtora, Consultant Radiologist, Salford Royal NHS Foundation Trust, Salford, Lancashire. For services to the NHS.
- Leslie Manson, Executive Director of Education, Leisure And Housing, Orkney Islands Council. For services to Scottish Education and the community in Orkney.
- Prof. John Marshall, Frost Professor of Ophthalmology, Institute of Ophthalmology in association with Moorfields Eye Hospital, University of London. For services to Ophthalmology.
- Judy Gordon, Lady Martin, Director, Young Person's Concert Foundation. For services to Music and to charity.
- Richard Martin. For services to the City of London Corporation.
- Kathleen Mary Masters. For services to Conquest Art in Godalming, Surrey.
- Douglas Matthews, Literary Indexer. For services to Literature.
- Vina Mayor, Chair, Nursing and Midwifery Council Fitness to Practice Panel, Bedfordshire. For services to the NHS.
- Tracey McAdam, Manager of Eastleigh College House, Hampshire. For services to Education.
- Moira McArthur, Headteacher, Sandaig Primary School, Glasgow. For services to Education and the community in Glasgow.
- Elizabeth McCafferty, Executive Officer, DWP Operations. For services to Jobseekers with Disabilities in Stirling.
- Lynn McCafferty, Headteacher, Brucehill Early Education and Childcare Centre, West Dunbartonshire. For services to Education.
- June McCombie, Senior Research Officer, University of Nottingham. For services to Science.
- Brian McDowell, Voluntary Receptionist, Lagan Valley Island Civic Centre, Lisburn. For voluntary services to the community in Lisburn.
- Gerard McElroy DL, Member, North Lanarkshire Council. For services to Local Government and the community in Lanarkshire.
- Peter McFall, Member, Independent Monitoring Board, HM Prison Kennet. For services to Criminal Justice.
- Dennis Patrick McKeever. For services to Drama and Music in Northern Ireland.
- Howard William (Jasper) McKinney, Assistant Director of Student Services, Southern Regional College. For services to Further Education and Student Welfare in Northern Ireland.
- Rachel McLaughlin, Ministry of Defence. For services to Defence.
- Ian McMorris, Chairperson of the Board of Governors, Lagan College. For voluntary service to Integrated Education in Northern Ireland.
- Charles William McMurray, Treasurer, Building Preservation Trust Movement. For services to Built Heritage and to Conservation in Northern Ireland.
- Peter McNestry, Chair, Coalfields Regeneration Trust, Wath upon Dearne, Rotherham. For services to Coalfield Communities.
- Sylvia Flora Agnes McRoberts, Member, Armagh City and District Council. For services to Local Government and to the community.
- Mel Mehmet, Chief Executive, easitNETWORK. For services to Business and Sustainable Transport.
- Nilima Menski, Founder, Centre For Indian Classical Dance. For services to Dance.
- Valerie Carol Mercer, Higher Officer, Risk and Intelligence Service, London, HM Revenue and Customs. For services to Preventing Alcohol Fraud.
- Alan Frederick Millam. For services to the community in Braintree, Essex.
- Gerry Millar, General Practitioner and MacMillan facilitator. For services to Healthcare in Northern Ireland.
- Thomas Millar, Broadcaster, BBC Radio Ulster. For services to Pipe Band Music in Northern Ireland.
- Doreen Jacqueline Miller-Charlton, board member, Miller Ltd. For services to Industry and to International Trade.
- Michael Miller-Smith. For services to Aviation for People with Disabilities through Aerobility.
- Roger Beverley Norton Mills. For services to Voluntary and Charitable Giving in South Cheshire.
- Brian Raymond Douglas Mitchell, general manager, Rayleigh Boys Football Club. For services to Youth Football.
- Andrew Moncrieffe, 2012 Recruitment Consultant, Department for Work and Pensions. For services to Diversity and Inclusion in the London 2012 Olympic and Paralympic Games.
- Molly Sheila Morris, Foster carer and adoptive parent, Oxfordshire. For services to Children and Families.
- William John Morris, Foster carer, Oxfordshire. For services to Children and Families.
- Tracy Mort, managing director, Grace Cole Ltd and Affinity Bay Ltd. For services to the UK Economy.
- Joy Rochelle Moss, Chair, Jewish Child's Day. For services to Charitable Giving and Disadvantaged Children in the UK and abroad.
- Michael Roy Mottram, Equipment Officer, South Yorkshire Fire and Rescue Service. For services to Local Government.
- Patricia Jayne Mudd, Nurse consultant, Cardiac Rhythm Management, South Tees Hospitals NHS Foundation Trust. For services to Healthcare.
- James Murdoch, DWP Operations. For services to Jobseekers and services to the community in Scotland.
- Anne Murray, Lay Member, Academy of Medical Royal Colleges and Faculties. For services to Healthcare.
- Catherine Lynn Myers, Head of Years 13 and 14 and Teacher governor, Strathearn School, Belfast. For services to Education and voluntary service to Young People in North Belfast
- Geetha Nagasubramanian, Consultant Gynaecologist, Head of Service, Tower Hamlets Contraception and Sexual Health Services, Barts Health NHS Trust, London. For services to Women and Young People.
- Paul Rossiter Newsome JP. For voluntary service to SSAFA Forces Help in Dorset.
- Robert William Nicholson. For services to Tourism in Somerset.
- Paul Nickson, Head of Arrivals and Departures, LOCOG. For services to the London 2012 Olympic and Paralympic Games.
- Simona Carol Novelli, Operations Director, Cox Exhibition Consultants Ltd. For services to International Trade.
- Nana Abrah Nyarko, Bus station controller. For services to London's Buses.
- Lugina Oates. For services to the community in West Cornwall.
- Angela Jean O'Brien. For services to Drama in the South West.
- Patricia O'Hagan, managing director, Core Systems (NI) Ltd. For services to the Northern Ireland Economy.
- Margaret Alison Ollerenshaw, lately Chair, Cheshire Police Authority. For services to Policing.
- Damian Angelo O'Reilly, Inspector, Greater Manchester Police. For services to Policing and the community of Gorton.
- George William Ottowell. For services to the community in Easington Colliery, Durham.
- Elaine Owen, Superintendent clinical specialist physiotherapist, Child Development Centre, Bangor. For service to Children with Disabilities.
- Richard John Ashwin Owen, District Officer, Hampshire Special Constabulary. For services to Policing.
- Christopher Page, Ministry of Defence. For services to Defence and to Young People through the RN Volunteer Cadet Corps.
- Cassa Pancho, Artistic Director and Founder, Ballet Black. For services to Ballet.
- Caroline Parker, Actress. For services to Deaf Theatre and Drama.
- Dawood Parker, managing director, Melys Diagnostics. For services to Science and International Development.
- Gerald Parkes, Founder, Parkway Cinemas. For services to the UK Cinema Industry.
- Kaushik Chaturbhai Patel, Community pharmacist, Essex. For services to Pharmacy.
- Rajesh Patel, Community pharmacist, Cheshire. For services to Pharmacy.
- Frank Paterson, lately Chair, Friends of the National Railway Museum. For services to Museums.
- Madhu Lata Pathak JP. For services to the community in Romford, Essex.
- Richard Stewart Pattman, Consultant in Genito-irinary Medicine, Newcastle Primary Care Trust. For services to Genito-urinary Medicine in the North East.
- Kay Payne. For services to Defence.
- Alan Peaford. Founding Trustee and Chairperson, Cornelia de Lange Syndrome Foundation. For services to People with Cornelia de Lange Syndrome and their Families.
- Elizabeth Rosemary Pearce. For services to the Samaritans and to Cruse Bereavement Care in Northern Ireland.
- Jean Pendlebury. For services to the community in Buxton, Derbyshire.
- Kevin John Penhale, Customs Officer, Border Force, Home Office. For services to Border Protection.
- Rachel Barnetson Phillips. For services to Scottish Country Dancing.
- Justine Anne Pickering, Founder, Ty Hapus. For services to People with Dementia and for charitable services to the NSPCC.
- Ruth Pickersgill, lately Diversity Manager, Leicester College. For services to Further Education.
- Catherine Diane Pickett, Senior Schools Governance Manager, Welsh Government. For public service to the Safety of Schoolchildren.
- Caroline Pidgeon, Liberal Democrat leader, London Assembly. For public and political service.
- Lillian Pilcher, Police staff, Hertfordshire Police. For services to Policing.
- Elizabeth Pitcairn. For services to Young People in Scotland through the Girl Guides.
- Harry Pitchforth, Country Manager, Iraq, KBR. For services to the Defence Industry.
- Mary Elizabeth Plume, Administrative Officer, Ministry of Defence. For services to the Armed Forces.
- Aleksandra Podhorodecka, Chair, Polish Education Society. For services to Education.
- Kim Lesley Popratnjak, Principal, North Birmingham Academy. For services to Education.
- Shirley Price. For charitable services in East Sussex.
- Virginia Prifti, Founder, Lawrence's Roundabout Well Appeal. For charitable services in the UK and Southern Africa.
- Elspeth Jean Day Pringle, Prosecutor, Central Fraud Group, Crown Prosecution Service. For services to Law and Order.
- John Pritchard, Paramedic, Scottish Ambulance Service. For services to the Scottish Ambulance Service and BASICS Scotland.
- Gerry Proctor. For services to the community in Liverpool.
- Raymond John Puddifoot, Leader, Hillingdon Council. For services to the community in Hillingdon, Middlesex.
- Felicity Anne Pugh. For charitable services in Cambridge.
- Simon Pugh-Jones, Science teacher, Writhlington School, Bath. For services to Education.
- Barbara Eileen Purbrick, Volunteer, Conservative Party Member, Putnoe Branch. For political service.
- Gillian Barbara Mary Quinn, Founder, Gillian Quinn School of Theatre Dance. For services to Dance.
- Howard Ian Rabin, Founder and librarian, Lubavitch Lending Library. For services to Libraries.
- Emdadur Rahman, Journalist and community volunteer. For services to the community in Tower Hamlets and to the Bangladeshi Media.
- Mark Ramprakash, lately England, Middlesex and Surrey CCC Cricketer. For services to Sport.
- Jenny Stephanie Ramsden. For services to Further Education and to Mathematics Education through the UK Mathematics Trust.
- Siobhan Redmond, Actress. For services to Drama.
- Kenneth George Haldane Reedie, lately Curator, Canterbury Museum Service. For services to Museums in Kent.
- David Rees, Aviation Operational Analyst, Corda Consulting. For services to Defence Capability.
- Helen Jane Rees, Teacher in charge, First Steps Nursery, The Willows Academy, Hillingdon. For services to Education.
- Douglas George Reynolds JP. For services to the community in the Royal Borough of Kingston upon Thames, Surrey.
- Glyn Rhodes, Founder, Sheffield Boxing Centre. For services to Boxing and Young People in Sheffield.
- Patrick Rice, Football Coach and lately Assistant Manager, Arsenal Football Club. For services to Sport.
- David Cyril Elliot Ridgeon, Vice-Chairman, Ridgeon Builders Merchants. For services to the Builders Merchants Industry and to the community in Cambridgeshire.
- Geoffrey Max Roberts. For services to the community in Aughton and West Lancashire.
- Pamela Rodway, Farmer, Wester Lawrenceton Farm, Morayshire. For services to the Promotion of Sustainable Food Production and Food Education in Scotland.
- Thelma Roll. For services to the community in Stoke Prior, Worcestershire.
- Joseph Peter Roper. For services to Education and to the community in Birkenhead, Merseyside.
- Michael Rossiter, lately Headteacher, Woodlesford Primary School, Leeds. For services to Education and to the community in Leeds.
- Jean Margaret Rowland. For voluntary services to the Physically Handicapped and Able Bodied Club, Newport, South Wales.
- Rosalind Louise Rowley. For services to the community in Scarborough, North Yorkshire.
- Douglas Roxburgh. For services to Residential Child Care in Edinburgh.
- Adrian Ruddle – Prison Officer, HM Young Offenders' Institute, Deerbolt. For services to HM Prison Service and the Care of Prisoners.
- Alan Sanderson. Plant Manager, Kingsnorth Power Station. For services to the Energy Industry.
- Enid Millicent Scaife. For services to the community in Sadberge, Durham.
- William Scott. For voluntary service to the Air Training Corps in Northern Ireland.
- Paul Sculthorpe. For services to Rugby League and to charity.
- Elizabeth Seabrook, Administrator, Insurance Company. For services to Bioscience.
- Hannah Seakins, Ministry of Defence. For services to Military Operations.
- Mark Sealy, Director, Autograph: the Association of Black Photographers. For services to Photography.
- Colin Adrian Reginald Sedgwick, Operations Manager, Southend Lifeboat, RNLI. For services to Maritime Safety.
- Popatlal Sojpar Shah. For services to Charitable Giving in the UK and Overseas.
- Philip Mark Shapiro, Chair, Cornerhouse. For services to the Arts.
- Kenneth James Sharkey, Farmer and Member, Livestock and Meat Commission. For services to Agriculture in Northern Ireland.
- Joann Rose Marie Sharpley. For services to the community in Woking, Surrey.
- Graham Shaw, Assistant Chief Driving Examiner, Driving Standards Agency. For services to Motorcycle Safety.
- Richard Leslie Shaw, Volunteer, the Teenage Cancer Trust and the Norfolk Hospice Tapping House. For services to charity.
- Freda Sheehy. For services to the community in Norwich.
- Maureen Simpson, Foster carer, Hounslow, London. For services to Looked After Children.
- Linda Anne Sloan, Senior Auditor, Internal Audit, Department for International Development. For services to Governance in Fragile States.
- Alan William Bedford Smith, Chairman, Pipex Ltd. For services to the Manufacturing Industry.
- Hilda Smith. For services to Vulnerable and Older People.
- Linda Soon, Head of Chinese Investment UK, UK Trade and Investment. For services to the Promotion of Chinese Businesses in the UK.
- David Malcolm South, Chair, Holcombe Hockey Club. For services to Sport.
- Mary Rose Spiegelberg, Patron, St. Luke's Hospice, Cheshire. For services to Palliative Care.
- Heather Stanning. For services to rowing.
- Ronald Arthur Stanley, Senior Systems Engineer, Ofcom. For services to Spectrum Engineering.
- Richard William Stanton, Firefighter, West Midlands Fire and Rescue Service. For services to Local Government.
- Jack Stephenson. For services to the community and to charity in Scarborough, North Yorkshire.
- John Mason Stoddard JP. For services to the community in Letchworth, Hertfordshire.
- Nigel William Stone, Detective Superintendent, Bedfordshire Police. For services to Policing.
- Yvonne Zena Stone, Senior Officer, Criminal Investigation, Birmingham, HM Revenue and Customs. For services to Prevention of Smuggling and Asset Recovery.
- Fiona Elizabeth Stuart DL, President, The Tullochan Trust. For services to Young People in Dunbartonshire.
- Mark Andrew Suffolk, Founder and managing director, Suffolk Pointe Shoe Company Ltd. For services to Manufacturing.
- Colin Michael John Sutherland. For services to the community in Banstead, Surrey.
- Jennifer Swanson, Officer, Support Team Manager, Large Business Service, Newcastle, HM Revenue and Customs. For services to the Tax System and voluntary service to Children.
- Dr. Charles Swithinbank, Glaciologist. For services to Exploration and Research in the Antarctic.
- Carl John Ames Tantum. For services to charity in East Hampshire.
- Gary Charles Taylor, managing director, Valley Grown Nurseries and former vice-chairman, NFU Horticulture and Potato Board. For services to the UK Pepper Industry.
- Anne Christine Thomas. For services to the community in Newport, South Wales.
- Sarah Madeleine Thompson, Head, Department of Physics, University of York. For services to Higher Education.
- Andrew Edward Thomson. For services to Bowls.
- Joan Hastwell Thornycroft. For services to the Beauty Therapy Industry.
- Roger Michael Thrift, Underwriting Adviser, Life Science Insurance Company. For services to Bioscience.
- Gillian Timmis, Fundraiser, Children in Care. For charitable services to Children in the UK and Abroad.
- Trevor George Tipple. For services to Church Music in Worcestershire.
- Erica Grace Towner, lately Director of Partnerships, University of East Anglia. For services to Higher Education.
- Victor George Truluck. For charitable services in Hastings, East Sussex.
- Iain Tuckett, Group Director, Coin Street Community Builders. For services to Architecture and Regeneration.
- John Michael Tupman, Special Constable, Wiltshire Police. For services to Policing and to the community in Marlborough.
- Andrew Philip Turner, Deputy chairman, Greater Manchester Area Conservative Group. For political service and service to the community in Hale Barns
- Richard Hugh Turpin, Vice-Chair, Hospitality Action and Chair, Ark Foundation. For charitable services to the Hospitality Industry.
- Eric Twigger, lately Chair of Governors, Hull College. For services to Further Education.
- Catherine Oliaku Ugwu, executive producer (production), London 2012 Olympics opening and closing ceremonies. For services to the London 2012 Olympic and Paralympic Games.
- John Underhill. For voluntary service to the Royal British Legion.
- Patricia Usher, lately Director of Student and Academic Administration, University of Southampton. For services to Higher Education.
- David Valentine, lately Head of Economic Development, Angus Council. For services to Local Government and the community in Angus.
- Lisa Vernon, Chief Executive, Derbyshire Learning and Development Consortium. For services to Learning and Skills.
- Harriet Vine, Co-Founder, Tatty Devine. For services to the Fashion Industry.
- Alan Walker, Honorary Fellow, University of Edinburgh. For services to Science Engagement and Science Education in Scotland.
- Carol Walton. For services to Midwifery and Breastfeeding Mothers in Wales.
- Caroline Mary Ward, Founder and Manager, Little Oaks Community Nursery, Wavendon, Milton Keynes. For services to Special Needs Education.
- Andrew George Wardman, Consultant physician and Director of Medical Education, Wigan. For services to Hospital Medicine.
- David Warin. For services to Drive Alive and to the community in Pickering, North Yorkshire.
- Wendy Jill Watson, Founder, National Hereditary Breast Cancer Helpline. For services to People with Breast Cancer.
- Stephen Webster, Jewellery entrepreneur and craftsman. For services to Training and Skills in the British Jewellery Industry.
- Kresse Wesling, Entrepreneur. For services to Corporate Social Responsibility.
- Patricia Whaley, lately Regional Director for North East, National Institute of Adult Continuing Education. For services to Adult Learning.
- Frances Elizabeth White, Manager, Little Haddon Residential Care Home. For services to People with Learning Disabilities.
- Gary White, lately Chief Superintendent, Police Service of Northern Ireland. For services to Policing and to the community in North and West Belfast.
- Jacqueline White, Volunteer swimming instructor. For services to Disability Swimming and to the community in Enfield, Middlesex.
- Jane White, Volunteer, Citizens' Advice Bureau, Hitchin. For services to the community in Hertfordshire.
- Philip White, Chief Executive, Hestercombe Gardens Trust. For services to Historic Garden Restoration.
- Andrew Whitehall, Constable, Staffordshire Police. For services to Young People in Stone, Staffordshire.
- Hilary Whittaker, Chief Executive, Beating Bowel Cancer, Surrey. For services to Bowel Cancer Awareness.
- Maxine Eloise Whitton, Patron, Vitiligo Society. For the advancement of knowledge and research into Vitiligo.
- Piriadarshni Wignarajah, Senior Manager, Olympic Delivery Network, UK Trade and Investment. For services to the British Business Embassy.
- George Willacy JP. For services to the community in Annandale and Eskdale, Dumfries and Galloway.
- David Ronald Williams, managing director, WTW Cinemas. For services to Regional Cinema.
- Eleanor Williams. For services to Healthcare and for charitable services in South Wales and Overseas.
- Gerald Robert Williams, Custodian and Guide, Hedd Wyn's Historic Home, Yr Ysgwrn, Snowdonia.
- John Williams. For services to Rugby and charitable services in Wales.
- Simon Williams, Head of 2012 Operations, Weymouth and Portland Borough Council. For services to the London 2012 Olympic and Paralympic Games.
- Terry Lynn Williams, lately Headteacher, Litchard Primary School, Bridgend. For services to Education in Wales.
- John Hampton Wilson. For services to the community in Northern Ireland.
- Robert Wilson, Secretary, Friends of Lady Home Hospital. For services to the community in Lanarkshire.
- Evelyn Ann Winfield, lately Leader, Cwmbran Community Council. For services to Local Government and the community in Cwmbran, Torfaen.
- Jane Elizabeth Withey, Founder, Partnership for Action Against Wildlife Crime]. For services to Wildlife Law Enforcement and to Girlguiding in Somerset North.
- Susan Ronagh Witthames, Governor, Oulton Broad Primary School and Fen Park Community Primary School, Suffolk. For services to Education.
- Rosie Wolfenden, Co-Founder, Tatty Devine. For services to the Fashion Industry.
- David George Edwin Wood. For services to Education and Training in General Practice and to the community in North Wales.
- Derek William Paitson Wood, For services to the community in Farnborough, Hampshire.
- Guy Elliot Woodford. For services to charity and to the community in Willingdon, East Sussex.
- Prof. Linda Woodhead, Professor of Sociology of Religion, Lancaster University. For services to Higher Education.
- Richard Wootton, Communications Infrastructure Manager, Maritime and Coastguard Agency. For services to the Coastguard Agency.
- Marilyn Wright, lately Head of HR and Facilities, One North East. For services to Business in the North East.
- Margaret Elizabeth Wynn. For services to Elderly People at the Sprowston Day Centre in Norwich, Norfolk.
- Margaret Elizabeth Yates. For services to the community in St Helens, Merseyside.
- Robert David Young, London 2012 Nations and Regions Group Co-ordinator for the North-West, Government Olympic Executive. For services to the London 2012 Olympic and Paralympic Games.

=== British Empire Medal (BEM) ===
- Leslie John Ager – For services to Music in Haverhill, Suffolk.
- Valerie Ahern – Vice-Chair, Templar's Estate Residents Association. For services to Tenant Empowerment in Witham.
- Eileen Alldritt – For services to Tenant Empowerment and the community in Liverpool.
- Christine Allen – Chief Executive, Forum Housing Association. For services to the community in Merseyside.
- Elizabeth Allison – For services to Sutton Coldfield Civic Society.
- Michael Ames – For services to the community in Bury St Edmunds, Suffolk.
- Mary Anderson – Centre Manager, The Broomhouse Centre. For services to the community in Broomhouse, Edinburgh.
- Heather Andrews – President, 1st Yeovil Girls' Brigade. For services to Children and Young People.
- Janice Andrews – Chair, Parent Staff And Student Association, Admiral Lord Nelson Secondary School, Portsmouth. For services to Education.
- John Ashworth – Basketball Coach. For voluntary service to Basketball and the community in the London Borough of Bromley.
- Lewis Henry – Badger Volunteer, Cannock Chase Area of Outstanding Natural Beauty. For services to the Environment.
- Colin Baker – For services to the Royal Mail and to Dorchester Disabled Club.
- Donald Baker – Support Grade Band 1, HMP Cardiff. For services to HM Prison Service and voluntary services to People with Impaired Vision.
- Peter Barrell – Founder and chairman, Chris Barrell Memorial Trust. For services to Children, Young People and Families.
- Geoffrey Bartholomew – For services to Youth Football in Grimsby and Cleethorpes.
- Lynn Bartlett – For services to the community in Polruan, Cornwall.
- Ann Barwood – For voluntary services to Exeter Cathedral.
- David Bennet – For services to Music in Perthshire.
- Sylvia Bernard – For services to the community in the London Borough of Wandsworth.
- Elaine Bertenshaw – Volunteer, Lancashire Constabulary. For services to Policing and the community.
- Alison Bevan, director, Penlee House, Penzance – For services to Cultural Heritage in Cornwall.
- Judith Biggs – Station Host, Warwick Parkway railway station. For services to Railway Passengers in Warwickshire.
- Brenda Bonwell – Chair, Weymouth and Portland Friends Group, Julia's House Children's Hospice. For services to Charity.
- John Bostock – Lately Course Director's Assistant, The Open University. For services to Higher Education.
- Alice Bovill – Chair, St Mary's Association of Residents And Tenants. For services to the community in Dundee.
- Dawn Bracken – Volunteer Trailblazer. For services to the London 2012 Olympic and Paralympic Games.
- Peter Branker – For services to Young People, charity and the community in Dromore, Northern Ireland.
- David Brazier – Chair, Ground Committee, Woodmansterne Sports Club. For services to Sport.
- Daphne Breakspear – For services to Amateur Drama in Swindon.
- Stacey Brown – Property Officer, Surrey Police. For public and charitable services.
- John Bryant – For services to the community in Kingsthorne, Herefordshire.
- Jeremy Buckle – Event Director, UK Young Scientists and Engineers Fair. For services to Science and Engineering.
- Robert Buller-Barker – For services to the community in Great Oxendon, Leicestershire.
- David Burchell – For voluntary service to St John Ambulance in the London Borough of Sutton.
- John Burkhill – For charitable services in Sheffield, South Yorkshire.
- Robert Bushell – District President, Royal Kingston Scout District, London. For services to Scouting.
- Barry Buxton – For services to the community in Ropsley, Lincolnshire.
- Agnes Cadger – Club Secretary, Scottish Classic Racing Motor Club. For services to Motorcycle Racing.
- Janet Campbell – For voluntary service to the British Red Cross Society in Argyll.
- David Cargill – For services to the community in Radyr and Morganstown, Cardiff.
- Kathleen Carhart – For services to the community in Little Dunmow, Essex.
- Carol Carr – Lately Senior Tutor, College of St Hild And St Bede, Durham University. For services to Higher Education and Student Support.
- Yvonne Carson – Secretary, House of Commons. For services to Parliament and the Commonwealth.
- Ronald Cathcart – committee member, Co Armagh Royal Ulster Constabulary George Cross Association. For voluntary services to the community in Northern Ireland.
- Marlene Chambers – For services to the community in Thornhill Lees, Dewsbury, West Yorkshire.
- Margaret Charlwood – Coach, Medau Society. For services to Exercise.
- Janet Chisholm – For services to the community in Middlewich, Cheshire.
- Stephen Christie – Technical Adviser for Media Studies, Wigan and Leigh College. For services to Further Education.
- Judith Clark – Fundraiser, Save The Children. For services to Children.
- Kate Clarke – For services to Young People in Co Down through the Kircubbin Youth Club and After Schools Club.
- Robert Clinton – For services to Veterans Aid.
- Ian Clough – For services to the communities in Kiagware, Kenya and Coity, Mid-Glamorgan.
- Sandra Coats – Catering Assistant, Barking and Dagenham College. For services to Further Education.
- Neil Cole – Retained Firefighter, Isle of Wight. For services to the community of the Isle of Wight.
- Rose Cooke-Coton – For services to the community in Masefield, Birmingham.
- David Corbett – For voluntary service to Aquatic Sport in the West Midlands.
- Ian Coulter – Charity Fundraiser. For services to charitable fundraising in Northern Ireland.
- Hilary Craft – Founder and Fundraiser, Action Against Cancer (incorporating Gene Machine Charity). For services to charity.
- Peter Culverwell – For services to the community in Biddenham, Bedfordshire.
- Douglas Currie – For services to Drama and Teaching in Edinburgh.
- Jean Curtis – For services to the community in Coningsby, Lincolnshire.
- Norman Cutter – For services to Music in Warrington.
- Mary Dale – For services to charity and to the community in Banbridge, Northern Ireland.
- Margaret Davies – For services to Music and the community.
- David Deacon – For charitable services and to the community in Warminster, Wiltshire.
- Georgina Dickson – For services to the community and charitable fundraising in Ballynahinch, Northern Ireland.
- Ian Dickson – Director, Friends of The Beatson West of Scotland Cancer Centre. For services to the Welfare of People with Cancer in the West of Scotland.
- Heather Didwell – Volunteer, Catton Grove Community Association. For services to the community in Norwich.
- James Dixon – For services to the community in Lincolnshire.
- Dr. Alice Doherty – For services to Oxfam, Musselburgh.
- Jennifer Donald – Voluntary Carer. For services to Older People in Milngavie, Dunbartonshire.
- Kim Douglas – Chair, George Coller Memorial Fund. For services to People with Asthma.
- Cllr Annette Drake – For public and voluntary service to the community in Wokingham, Berkshire.
- Hector Duff. For services to the Manx Veterans, community and education. (Isle of Man)
- Beryl Duggan – Welfare Officer, Northwest Branch, British Retinitus Pigmentosa Society. For services to charity.
- David Dunn – Chair, West Lancashire Civic Trust and Chair, West Lancashire Borough Council's Conservation Areas Advisory Panel. For services to Conservation in West Lancashire.
- Jill Earney – For services to the community in Hatfield Peverel, Essex.
- William Edwardes – For services to the 43 Wessex Regimental Association and to the community in Chandler's Ford, Hampshire.
- Maureen Edwards – For services to North Shropshire Hunt Pony Club.
- Latifa Edmonds, lately Commissioner of Girl-guiding, Gibraltar. For services to Girl-guiding and to the community in Gibraltar.
- Albert Elson, Branch Secretary, Royal British Legion, Thailand. For services to the British community in Thailand.
- Beryl Emery – For charitable services in Rugby, Warwickshire.
- Peter England – For services to the community in Welshpool, Powys.
- Joan Evans – Founder and Charity Manager, Rotherfield St Martin. For services to the community in Rotherfield, East Sussex.
- David Fairchild – For services to the communities in Haddenham and Aldreth, Cambridgeshire.
- Cecilia Fernie – Founder, Greyhound Rescue, Fife. For services to Animal Welfare.
- Daphne Field – For services to charity and to the community in Chelmsford, Essex.
- Joyce Fieldhouse – Volunteer, Mencap, Leeds. For services to People with Learning Disabilities and their Families.
- John William Filby – For services to the community in Abridge, Essex.
- Bryan Finlay – Community Resuscitation Development Officer, Scottish Ambulance Service. For services to Healthcare and the community in the Lothians and Borders.
- Andrea Finn – For services to the community in Wood Green, Hampshire.
- Dorothy Fisher – Fundraiser, RSPCA. For services to Animal Welfare and the community in Cornwall.
- Adam Forshaw – For services to Young People through Scouting and Martial Arts in Cheshire.
- Susan Freeman – For services to the community in Thaxted, Essex.
- Charles Friel – For services to the Railway Preservation Society of Ireland.
- Christopher Fryer – Group Scout Leader, 1st Bayston Hill Scout Group, Shrewsbury, Shropshire. For services to Children and Young People.
- Graham Furley – For services to the community in Stroud, Gloucestershire.
- Colin Gardiner – Operations Manager, Helensburgh Lifeboat, RNLI. For services to Maritime Safety.
- Kenneth Garland – For services to the community in York.
- Michael Gee – For services to Orchard Conservation in North Devon.
- Jane Gemmill – For services to the community in Stradbroke, Suffolk.
- Mary Gerrard – School Caretaker and Governor, Hollinsclough Cofe Primary School, Buxton. For services to Education.
- Rosemary Gibson, British-Peruvian International College. For services to education in Peru.
- Katherine Gilcreest – Anti-Social Behaviour Manager, London Borough of Barking and Dagenham. For services to the community in East London.
- Avneet Gill – Trailblazer Volunteer. For services to the London 2012 Olympic and Paralympic Games.
- Thomas Gilzean – For services to charitable fundraising in Edinburgh.
- Robert Girvan – For services to the community in Hitchin, Hertfordshire.
- Dr. Ann Goddard – For services to the community in Hertsmere, Hertfordshire.
- Mary Goulding – For services to charity and to the community in Winchester, Hampshire.
- Mary Graham – For voluntary service to Healthcare.
- Robert Green – For services to the community in Bilston, West Midlands.
- Charles Grice – Chief Coach, Droylsden Amateur Boxing Club. For services to Boxing.
- Mark Grinnall – For voluntary service through Paul's Place.
- Keith Haisman – Chair of Governors and Chair of Finance And Premises, Stour Valley Community School. For services to Education.
- Christine Hall – Head Coach, Tynedale Amateur Swimming Club. For services to Swimming.
- Grenville Ham – Project Development Manager, The Green Valleys. For services to Renewable Energy in Wales.
- Emma Hamlen – Volunteer, Youth Offending Team. For services to Young People in Lancashire.
- Patricia Hampshire – For services to Emley Moor, Riding for the Disabled in Huddersfield.
- Lindsay Hanna – Chairman, Laurelbank Carriage Driving for the Disabled. For services to People with Physical and Mental Disabilities through the Riding for the Disabled Association.
- Patricia Harding – Nursery Nurse And Volunteer, Viking Primary School, Northolt, Middlesex. For services to Education.
- Elizabeth Hardy – For services to the community in Great Amwell, Hertfordshire.
- Margaret Hardy – For services to the community in Saddleworth, Greater Manchester.
- Dorene Hargreaves – For services to Fitness and to the community in Bedminster and Wick, South Gloucestershire.
- Susan Harrison – For services to Independent Community Cinema in Aldeburgh.
- Sheila Hatcher – Pipe Major, Dagenham Girl Pipers. For services to Music.
- Anne Hawkins – For services to Elderly People in Hildenborough, Kent.
- Muriel Healey – board member, Havebury Housing Partnership. For services to Tenants in Suffolk.
- Trevor Hellier – For services to the community in Polden Hill, Somerset.
- Rachel Hemphill – Honorary Chair, Cancer Research UK Castlederg Fundraising Committee. For services to the community in Northern Ireland.
- Vivienne Heys – Departmental Superintendent, Royal Veterinary College. For services to Higher Education and Animal Health.
- David Highton – For services to the community in the London Borough of Ealing.
- Carole Hillman – For voluntary service to St John Ambulance and the community in Gwent.
- Richard Hinton – Programme Manager, LOCOG. For services to the London 2012 Olympic and Paralympic Games.
- Stephen Hiser – Volunteer, Fisher Amateur Boxing Club, Bermondsey. For services to Youth Boxing in the London Borough of Southwark.
- Joanna Hoad – Chair, Blue Badge 2012 Committee. For services to Tourism and to the London 2012 Olympic and Paralympic Games.
- Frederick Hobbs – For services to the community in Prestatyn, Denbighshire.
- Susan Holland – For services to the community in Lydford, Devon.
- Christopher Holt – For services to the community in Hunstanton, Norfolk.
- Hilda Holyman – For services to the Diamond Riding Centre in Carshalton and to the community in Banstead, Surrey.
- Alan Hooker – For services to Scouting and to the community in Little Hallingbury, Essex.
- Anthony Hopkins – Associate Director of Day Care Services, Broadmoor Hospital. For services to Nursing.
- Morag Hopkins – Industrial Caterer, HMP Haverigg. For services to HM Prison Service and the Rehabilitation of Offenders.
- Graham Houghton – Member, Neighbourhood Watch, St Johns, Worcester. For services to Community Safety.
- Jill Hucklesby – For services to the community in Peterborough.
- John Hucklesby – For services to the community in Peterborough.
- Robert Hunt – For services to the community in Birmingham, West Midlands.
- Asim Iftikhar – For services to the community in Poplar, London Borough of Tower Hamlets.
- John James – For voluntary and charitable services to the community in Dundee.
- Margaret Jessop – For charitable services in Boston, Lincolnshire.
- Sylvia Jones – For charitable services in Oakham, Rutland.
- Daksha Joshi – For services to the community in Strand on the Green, London Borough of Hounslow.
- Val Joslin – For services to the community in Tatworth, Somerset.
- Patrick Joyce – Fundraiser, Motor Neurone Disease Association. For services to charity.
- Denise Kelly – lately Higher Level Teaching Assistant, Bodnant Infants School, Prestatyn. For services to Education in Denbighshire.
- Muhammed Khan – Trailblazer Volunteer. For services to the London 2012 Olympic and Paralympic Games.
- Alan Kilpatrick – Director, Friends of The Beatson West of Scotland Cancer Centre. For services to the Welfare of People with Cancer in the West of Scotland.
- Amanda Kimmins – For services to the community of St Agnes, Cornwall.
- John King – For services to the community in Newbury, Berkshire.
- Helen Kirk – Campaigner And Volunteer, Thorne And Hatfield Moors. For services to Conservation.
- Betty Koppa – For services to the community and Residents of North Curry, Taunton.
- Shaun Lansfield – For services to Tenant Engagement and to the community in Edmonton, London Borough of Enfield.
- Agnes Leask – Crofter. For services to Crofting in Shetland.
- Jane Legat – For services to the community in Whiteparish, Wiltshire.
- Helen Lerner – For services to the community in Walthamstow through the Walthamstow Village Residents Association in East London.
- Wesley Lewis JP – For services to Young People in Belfast through the Boys' Brigade.
- Mavis Littleford – For services to charity in Wolverhampton.
- Jessie MacNeil – For services to the community on the Isle of Barra, Western Isles.
- James MacRae DL – For voluntary service in Dunbartonshire.
- Phyllis Madron – Fundraiser, RNLI Penlee and Penzance. For services to Maritime Safety.
- Bridie Marshall – Youth Worker, Peasedown Youth Centre. For services to Young People and Families in Bath and North East Somerset.
- Dennis Marshall – For services to Judo in Hertfordshire.
- Frederek Mayman – For voluntary service to Railway Heritage in the West Midlands and Wales.
- Diana Mcdowell – For services to Heritage in Shaftesbury, Dorset through the Gold Hill Museum.
- Brian McGoran – For voluntary service to Badminton.
- Jacqueline McGrew – Chair, Whitebirk Tenants And Residents Association. For services to the community in Blackburn, Lancashire.
- Ethel McIvor – Leader, Lollipop Playgroup, Donaghmore. For services to the development of Early Years Education in Northern Ireland.
- Marguerite McLaughlin – Chief Executive, Metro Centre. For services to Lesbian, Gay, Bisexual and Transgender, and African People in London and the South East.
- William Mellis – For services to the community in Bournville, West Midlands.
- Jean Meredith – For services to the community and to charity in Radstock, Somerset.
- Bridget Meyler – For services to Music in Northern Ireland.
- Matthew Milnes – Founder, Scholemoor Sport And Recreation Project. For services to the community in Bradford.
- Jennifer Mitchell – lately Forensic Policy Officer, National Policing Improvement Agency. For services to Policing.
- Joyce Mitchell – Club Leader, Cambridge Physically Handicapped Able Bodied Club. For services to the community in Cambridgeshire.
- Paul Modley – Senior Recruitment Manager, LOCOG. For services to the London 2012 Olympic and Paralympic Games.
- James Mole – For services to the community in Ford, Northumberland.
- David Moody. For services to the Jersey Sea Cadet Corps (TS Jersey). (Jersey)
- Monica Murdoch – For services to the community in Blagdon, Somerset.
- Brenda Murray – Co-Founder, Liverpool Historical Society. For voluntary service to Heritage and History in Liverpool and Seaforth.
- Maureen Neely – Administrator, Altnagelvin Hospital. For services to Healthcare and to the community in Northern Ireland.
- Charles Nelson – lately Teacher of Humanities and Duke of Edinburgh's Award Co-ordinator, Woodrush High School. For services to Education.
- Edward Neville – For charitable services through the Cardinal Hume Centre in the City of Westminster.
- Diana Nicholls – For services to the community in Newton Abbot, South Devon.
- David Nicholson – Manager E, HMP and Young Offenders Institute, Norwich. For services to the Rehabilitation of Prisoners.
- Mary Nicolson – Chair, Blackburn Family Centre. For services to the community in Blackburn, West Lothian.
- Prof. Deryck Nuttall – For services to the community in Taunton, Somerset.
- John O'Brien, Voluntary worker. For services to the community in Ireland.
- Stephen O'Keeffe – Fundraiser. For charitable services.
- Robert Oliver – Porter, Dove Marine Laboratory, University of Newcastle and Coxswain, Cullercoats Lifeboat. For services to Higher Education and to the community of Cullercoats
- Rosemary Pack – District President, Castle Point Girl Guides and Fundraiser, Motor Neurone Disease, Benfleet, Essex. For services to Young People and Charitable Fundraising.
- Mandy Painter – Fundraiser. For services to Seriously Ill Children through The Starlight Children's Foundation.
- Jit Pal – For services to charity and to the community in Southall, London Borough of Ealing.
- Alan Parry – Volunteer chairman, Lion Youth Club, Hoxton, London. For services to Children and Young People.
- Albert Leonard – Patient Volunteer, South Benfleet Primary School. For services to Education.
- Natasha Pearson – PE Teacher, Balby Carr Sports and Science College. For services to Education and for voluntary service to Children with Disabilities through Shine and Smile.
- Margaret Perryman – For services to the community in Huntingdon, Cambridgeshire.
- Dr. Arnold Phelops – For charitable services.
- Michael Picknett – Lifeboat Helmsman, RNLI. For services to Maritime Safety.
- Duncan Pigg – For services to the community in Hethersett, Norfolk.
- Colonel Richard Pinder – For services to the Fovant Bages Society and to the community in Fovant, Wiltshire.
- Lino Pires – For services to charity and to the community in Priors Hardwick, Warwickshire.
- Michael Pitt – For services to the Royal Air Force and to the community in Woolacombe, Devon.
- David Pollock – Chairman, Restoration of Appearance and Function Trust Charity. For charitable services to Reconstructive Plastic Surgery.
- Martyn Poole – For services to the community in Downend, South Gloucestershire.
- John Poore – For charitable services.
- Ralph Porter – For services to the community in Reeth, North Yorkshire.
- Howard Potter – For services to the community in Shere, Surrey.
- Eileen Price – For services to the community in the Garw Valley, Bridgend.
- Wendy Price – Manager and Supervisor, Llangrove Leapfrogs Childcare and Girl Guide Leader, Ross-On-Wye, Herefordshire. For services to Children, Young People and Families.
- Ann Priestman – For services to the community in Shelley, West Yorkshire.
- Geoffrey Prince – For services to the community through Will to Work in Frodsham, Cheshire.
- Cllr George Prosper – For services to the community in Lisvane, Cardiff.
- Julia Quilliam – For services to the community in the London Borough of Hounslow.
- Riaz Ravat – Deputy Director, St. Philip's Centre, Leicester. For services to Interfaith Understanding in Leicester.
- Hazel Rayson – Dance Teacher and Founder, Hazel Rayson Theatre Dance School. For services to Dance in the Tyneside area.
- Margaret Reid – For services to the community in Northern Ireland.
- Michael Reid – For charitable services in Fife and Angus.
- Rita Rhodes – For services to the community in Welbeck, Nottinghamshire.
- Pamela Richards – For services to the community in Foxhole, Cornwall.
- Maureen Richardson – For services to the community in Halton, Lancashire.
- Rosemary Ritchie – Volunteer, Queensferry RNLI Shop. For services to Maritime Safety.
- Valerie Robb – Member, Downshire School Parent Teachers Association, Carrickfergus. For services to Education in Carrickfergus, Northern Ireland.
- Sheila Roberts – For services to the community in Buckley, Flintshire.
- Elizabeth Robinson – For services to the community in Abingdon, Oxfordshire.
- Jacqueline Rowley – For services to the Eastleigh Friends of People With a Learning Disability, Hampshire.
- Alexander Russell – For services to the community in Kinglassie, Fife.
- Doris Russell – For services to the community in Colaton Raleigh, East Devon.
- Barbara Sabin – For services to the Salvation Army and to the community in Rotherham, South Yorkshire.
- Ernest Sangster – For voluntary service to the community in Banchory, Aberdeenshire.
- Kenneth Erwin Scotland, Community worker. For services to the community in Montserrat.
- John Scott – For services to the communities in Strensall and York, North Yorkshire.
- Mary Scott – Complementary Therapist, Northern Ireland Hospice. For services to Healthcare in Northern Ireland.
- Christopher Sellars – For services to Swimming Coaching in Derbyshire.
- Richard Sharrott – For charitable services in Nuneaton, Warwickshire.
- Ilona Soane-Sands. For Voluntary and Public Service to Alderney. (Guernsey)
- Michael Shore – President, Bristol And District Rugby Football Combination. For services to Community Rugby in South West England.
- Roger Shorter – For services to the community in Churchill, Oxfordshire.
- Donald Simms – Yeoman, Greenwich Foundation for the Old Royal Naval College. For services to the community in the Royal Borough of Greenwich.
- Ranjit Singh Dhanda – Lead for Faith Inclusion, Nishkam School Trust, Birmingham. For services to Education.
- Peter Skellon – For voluntary service to the RAF Association Concert Band.
- Humphrey Sladden – For services to the community in South Harting, West Sussex.
- Evelyn Slater – Prison Officer, HMP Bullingdon. For services to HM Prison Service.
- Jean Slater – For voluntary service to St. John Ambulance in Derbyshire.
- Lilan Smallshaw – For services to the community in Seend, Wiltshire.
- Arthur Smith – For services to Christ Church, Walmersley, Lancashire.
- Eunice Smith – Head of Constituency Finance, Conservative Central Headquarters. For political service.
- Freda Smith – For services to the community in Leyland, Lancashire.
- Barbara Snowling – For services to the community in Crafthole, Cornwall.
- Patricia Spencer – Chair Of NHS Greater Glasgow and Clyde Area Nursing and Midwifery Committee. For services to Nursing in Glasgow.
- Diana Spokes – Fundraiser, RNLI Bourne End Fundraising Branch. For services to Maritime Safety.
- Janet Stangroom – For services to the community in Whissonsett, Norfolk.
- Colonel Alan Tapp – For voluntary service to SSAFA Forces Help in Stirlingshire.
- Peter Taylor – For services to the community and to charity in Ipswich, Suffolk.
- Mary Thomas – For charitable services and to the community in Bowdon, Cheshire.
- Ethel Thompson – For services to the community in Blacon, Cheshire.
- Michelle Thompson – For services to charity and to the community in Darlington, Durham.
- Douglas Thornhill – For services to People with Disabilities and to the community in Basingstoke, Hampshire.
- Valerie Thornhill – Founder, VISTA. For services to Adult Education in East Yorkshire.
- Mark Todd – Accessibility Manager, LOCOG. For services to the London 2012 Olympic and Paralympic Games.
- Malcolm Torry – For services to Sailing and to People with Disabilities through Carsington Sailability in Derbyshire.
- Patricia Town JP – For services to the community in Steyning, West Sussex.
- Lorraine Tucker – For voluntary service to The City of Plymouth Children Fund and to the community in Devon.
- Joan Villiers – For charitable services in Yorkshire and Humberside through SportsAid and Heart Research UK.
- Patricia Wagstaff – Volunteer, Sobell House Hospice, Oxford. For services to charity.
- Rosalynde Walker – Co-Founder, North East Promenaders Against Cancer. For charitable services to People with Cancer.
- Richelle Walsh – Customer Service Assistant, Northern Rail Greenfield Station. For services to the Rail Industry and to the community in Oldham.
- Mary Wardle – For services to the community in Milltown, Derbyshire.
- Helen Watkins – For services to the community in Mudford, Somerset.
- Robert Watson – For services to the community in ChesterLe-Street, Durham.
- Dr. John Webster – For services to Journalism.
- Shirley West – Volunteer, British Heart Foundation. For services to charity.
- Thomas Westall – Scout Leader and School Governor, Lytham St. Annes. For services to Children and Young People.
- Penelope Weston-Webb – For services to the community in Cossington, Leicestershire.
- Robert Wheatley – For services to the community in Baycliff, Cumbria.
- Wendy White – For services to Netball in Wales.
- Christopher Wilby – lately Executive Director, Scarborough YMCA. For services to Young People.
- Shirley Williams – For services to Music, the community in West Wales and charitable services.
- Elizabeth Williamson – Ophthalmology Charge Nurse, NHS Borders. For services to Ophthalmology in the Scottish Borders.
- Irene Wills – For services to the Pisces Swimming Club and to the community in Plymouth, Devon.
- June Wilson – For services to the community in Brampton, Cambridgeshire.
- Geoffrey Winter – For services to Music and to the community in Grantham, Lincolnshire.
- Ernest Wyer – For services to the community in Morton and Hanthorpe, Lincolnshire.
- Gwenyth Yarker – Curator and Trustee, Dorset County Museum. For services to Museums.
- Eileen Younghusband – For services to Lifelong Learning in Cardiff and the Vale of Glamorgan.

=== Queen's Police Medal (QPM) ===
Ribbon bar of the Queen's Police Medal for Merit, as awarded for Distinguished Service

- Francis Jeremy Armstrong – Lately, Assistant Commissioner, City of London Police
- Steven Atkinson – Police Sergeant, Police Service of Northern Ireland
- Andrew Barker – Chief Constable, Fife Constabulary.
- James Kenneth Busby – Chief Superintendent, Metropolitan Police Service
- Jacqueline Elizabeth Crank – Detective Constable, Cheshire Police
- Howard John Crowther – Detective Chief Superintendent, West Yorkshire Police
- Mike Cunningham – Chief Constable, Staffordshire Police
- James Richard Harkness – Temporary Detective Chief Inspector, Police Service of Northern Ireland
- James Henry Engelbach – Police Constable, Metropolitan Police Service
- Mark Gilmore – Deputy Chief Constable, Northumbria Police
- Phil Michael Gormley – Chief Constable, Norfolk Police
- George Graham – Chief Constable, Northern Constabulary.
- David Griffin – Deputy Chief Constable, Humberside Police
- Sophocles "Jack" Ioannou – Police Inspector, British Transport Police
- Ingrid Lee – Temporary Assistant Chief Constable, West Yorkshire Police
- Pamela Mace – Detective Superintendent, Metropolitan Police Service
- Surjeet Manku – Chief Superintendent, West Midlands Police
- Mick Bryan Matthews – Temporary Chief Constable, Gloucestershire Police
- Philip Menary – Police Inspector, Police Service of Northern Ireland
- David O'Connor – Chief Superintendent, Northern Constabulary.
- Jackie Roberts – Temporary Chief Constable, Dyfed-Powys Police
- Philip Shakesheff – Police Inspector, West Mercia Police
- Thomas Simmons – Detective Constable, Metropolitan Police Service (transferred to CEOP)
- Peter Vaughan – Chief Constable, South Wales Police

=== Queen's Fire Service Medal (QFSM) ===
Ribbon bar of the Queen's Fire Service Medal for Merit, as awarded for Distinguished Service

- Ronald Beedie – Watch Manager, Grampian Fire and Rescue Service.
- Christopher Boulton – Senior Adviser to the Chief Fire and Rescue Adviser at Department for Communities and Local Government.
- Glynis Lomax – Head of the Operational Intelligence Unit.
- David Millar – Acting Chief Officer, Lothian and Borders Fire and Rescue Service.
- Gary Reason – Director of Operational Resilience and Training for services to the Olympics.
- Colin Rockey – Group Manager, Devon and Somerset Fire and Rescue Service.

=== Queen's Ambulance Service Medal (QAM) ===
- Michael Collins – Assistant Director, Workforce Development, Welsh Ambulance Services NHS Trust.
- Raymond Edensor – Paramedic, West Midlands Ambulance Service NHS Trust.
- Gary Hardacre – Head of Risk and Resilience, Scottish Ambulance Service.
- Hayden Newton – Chief Executive, East of England Ambulance Service NHS Trust.

=== Queen's Volunteer Reserves Medal (QVRM) ===
- Major (Local Lieutenant Colonel) Stephen Bartlett TD, The Rifles, Territorial Army.
- Brigadier Simon Bell TD, late The Cheshire Regiment, Territorial Army.
- Lieutenant Commander (Acting Commander) Simon Cottam RD, Royal Naval Reserve.
- Major Philip Davis, Corps of Royal Engineers, Territorial Army.
- Warrant Officer Maureen Kendall, Royal Auxiliary Air Force.
- Chaplain to the Forces 3rd Class The Reverend Louis Kinsey TD, Royal Army Chaplains' Department, Territorial Army.
- Sergeant Sonja McCoy, Royal Corps of Signals, Territorial Army.

=== Overseas Territories Police Medal ===
Ribbon bar of the Overseas Territories Police Medal for Merit, as awarded for Meritorious Service

- Emilio Acris – Superintendent, Royal Gibraltar Police.
- Elizabeth Gomez – Constable, Royal Gibraltar Police.

== Crown Dependencies ==
=== The Most Excellent Order of the British Empire ===
==== Officer of the Order of the British Empire (OBE) ====
Civil
Isle of Man

- Michael John Langdon, QPM for services to policing.

==== Member of the Order of the British Empire (MBE) ====
Guernsey

- Mike Tanguy, for public and voluntary services to Guernsey

Jersey

- David Shaw, for services to people in Kenya
- Margaret Bayes, for services to the community, the Jersey Association of Carers

Isle of Man

- June Winifred Evans, for services to motorcycling welfare

=== British Empire Medal (BEM) ===
Guernsey

- Ilona Soane-Sands, for voluntary and public service to Alderney.

Jersey

- David Moody, for services to the Jersey Sea Cadet Corps

Isle of Man

- Hector McDonald Hugh Duff, for services to the Manx Veterans community and education

== Cook Islands ==
Below are the individuals appointed, before her death, by Elizabeth II in her right as Queen of New Zealand, on advice of the Cook Islands Government.

=== Order of the British Empire ===
==== Officers of the Order of the British Empire (OBE) ====
- Te Maeu O Te Rangi Teikamata Ariki, Mii Tungane Upokoati O'Bryan. For services to the public and community.

==== Members of the Order of the British Empire (MBE) ====
- Jane Kimi Kaina. For services to the public and community.

==== Medallists of the Order of the British Empire (BEM) ====
- Terae Akai. For services to the Church and the community.
- Taamo Charlie Roi. For services to the public and the community.

== Barbados ==
Below are the individuals appointed by Elizabeth II in her right as Queen of Barbados, on advice of the Barbadian Government.

=== Order of the British Empire ===
==== Commanders of the Order of the British Empire (CBE) ====
- Shirley Vivian Bell. For public service and services to the legal profession.
- Everson Robinson Elcock. For service to business.
- Charles Emile Straker. For services to tourism and to the music industry in Barbados.

==== Officers of the Order of the British Empire (OBE) ====
- Joan Lorraine Blackett. For services to education.
- Anthony DeVere Browne. For services to industry and culture.
- Larry McDonald Mayers. For services to broadcasting.

==== Members of the Order of the British Empire (MBE) ====
- Victor DaCosta Farrell. For services in the field of medical laboratory technology in Barbados and other Caribbean countries.
- Robert Jeffery Kinch. For services to tourism and hospitality.
- Arlene Eleanor Miller. For services to the financial sector.

== Grenada ==
Below are the individuals appointed by Elizabeth II in her right as Queen of Grenada, on advice of the Grenadian Government.

=== Order of the British Empire ===
==== Members of the Order of the British Empire (MBE) ====
- Earldine Denese Joyce Alexander. For public service.
- Sheila De Silva. For public service.

==== Medallist of the Order of the British Empire (BEM) ====
- Catherine Joseph. For public service.

== Solomon Islands ==
Below are the individuals appointed by Elizabeth II in her right as Queen of the Solomon Islands, on advice of the Solomon Islands Government.

=== Order of the British Empire ===
==== Officers of the Order of the British Empire (OBE) ====
- The Right Reverend Thaba James Philip Mason. For services to the Anglican Church of Melanesia and community affairs.
- Henry Tom. For services to both the National and Provincial Government and to the people of West Kwaio constituency.
- George Cheuk Ping Tong MBE. For services to the private sector.

==== Members of the Order of the British Empire (MBE) ====
- Chief Ambrose Huhugu Bugotu. For services to the Anglican Church of Melanesia, Solomon Islands Planned Parenthood and to community affairs.
- Edrie Tahioa Indu. For services to education, in particular Chung Wah School.
- Ishmael Tavasi. For public service, and service to the people of Gella.
- Ezekiel Philip Theodi. For services to the health service and to community affairs.
- Chief Edward Vunagi. For services to education, to Isabel Provincial Government, and to community affairs.
- John Wong. For services to commerce, forestry, and to the rural community enterprise.

=== Queen's Police Medal (QPM) ===
- Sergeant Patricia Leta, Royal Solomon Islands Police Force.
- Nathaniel Virintire Mosese. For services to the Royal Solomon Islands Police Force.

== Saint Vincent and Grenadines ==
Below are the individuals appointed by Elizabeth II in her right as Queen of Saint Vincent and the Grenadines, on advice of the Vincentian Government.

=== Order of Saint Michael and Saint George ===
==== Companions of the Order of St Michael and St George (CMG) ====
- Leila Euphemia Greaves. For services to business and to the community.

=== Order of the British Empire ===
==== Officers of the Order of the British Empire (OBE) ====
- Dr. Roslyn Eartha Ambrose. For services to medicine.
- Elroy Raymond John. For services to banking.

==== Members of the Order of the British Empire (MBE) ====
- Renold Adolphus Hadaway. For services to the Royal Saint Vincent and the Grenadines Police Force, and to law and order.
- Moulton Theophilus Mayers. For services to architecture and to community work.
- Gideon Raymond Browne. For services to the construction industry and to the private sector.

== Belize ==
Below are the individuals appointed by Elizabeth II in her right as Queen of Belize, on advice of the Belizean Government.

=== Order of the British Empire ===
==== Commanders of the Order of the British Empire (CBE) ====
- Denys Arthur Barrow. For services to law and education.

==== Members of the Order of the British Empire (MBE) ====
- Patrick Alexander Bernard. For public service and his contribution to good governances.
- Pen Cayetano. For services to music and art.
- Cristina Hyde. For services to education and to the community.

== Antigua and Barbuda ==
Below are the individuals appointed by Elizabeth II in her right as Queen of Antigua and Barbuda, on advice of the Antiguan and Barbudan Government.

=== Order of the British Empire ===
==== Officers of the Order of the British Empire (OBE) ====
- Stephans Theodore Alexis Winter. For Public Service.

==== Members of the Order of the British Empire (MBE) ====
- The Reverend Dr. Edmund Green. For Public Service.
- Genevieve Smith. For Public Service.

=== Queen's Police Medal (QPM) ===
- Assistant Commissioner of Police Wilhelm Samuels. For services to the Royal Police Force of Antigua and Barbuda.
- Inspector Hyacinth Simon. For services to the Royal Police Force of Antigua and Barbuda.

=== Queen's Fire Service Medal (QFSM) ===
- Assistant Commissioner Sylvester Llewellyn Jackson. For services as Head of the Antigua and Barbuda Fire Service.

== Saint Christopher and Nevis ==
Below are the individuals appointed by Elizabeth II in her right as Queen of Saint Kitts and Nevis, on advice of the Kittian and Nevisian Government.

=== Order of the British Empire ===
==== Officers of the Order of the British Empire (OBE) ====
- Dr. James E. Williams. For Public Service.

==== Members of the Order of the British Empire (MBE) ====
- Franklyn Anderson Browne. For services to education.

== Collated lists ==
- United Kingdom:
  - HM Government (29 December 2012). "New Year Honours 2013 – Main List" (PDF). Honours Lists. Cabinet Office.
  - HM Government (29 December 2012). "New Year Honours 2013 – Olympics and Paralympics" (PDF). Honours Lists. Cabinet Office.
  - HM Government (29 December 2012). "New Year Honours 2013 – Departmental List" (PDF). Honours Lists. Cabinet Office.
