= International Association of Lighting Designers =

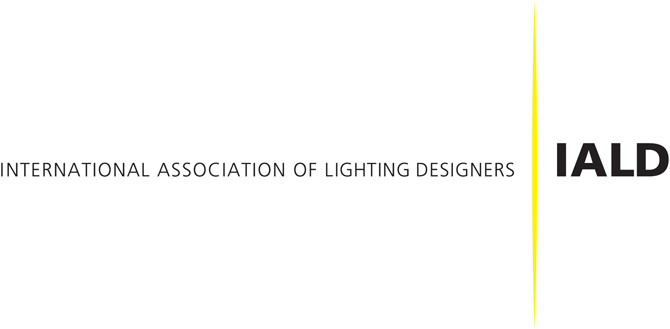
- Abbreviation: IALD
- Formation: 1969; 57 years ago
- Founders: Lesley Wheel et al.
- Purpose: Architectural lighting design
- Headquarters: Chicago, Illinois, United States
- Location: Brussels, Belgium
- Coordinates: 41.8904°N 87.6342°W
- Members: 1,500 (2021)
- Official language: English
- President: Andrea Hartranft
- Immediate Past President: Mônica Luz Lobo
- Treasurer: Brandon Thrasher
- Chief Executive Officer: Christopher Knowlton
- Staff: 6 (2024)
- Website: iald.org

The International Association of Lighting Designers (IALD) is a learned society of architectural lighting designers founded in 1969 and based in Chicago.

== History ==
In 1969, a group of lighting designers—including Ray Grenald and Howard Brandston—established the International Association of Lighting Designers. At that time, all existing industry organizations were primarily focused on the science and engineering of lighting rather than the aesthetic design.

One of the founding designers was Lesley Wheel. Originally trained in theatrical lighting design, Wheel had become the first woman to start a career in architectural lighting design. She later served as president of the IALD, and remained a fellow until her death in 2004.

== Partnerships ==
The IALD has partnered with the Illuminating Engineering Society (IES), the Alliance to Save Energy (ASE), and the United States Department of Energy (DOE) to promote sustainable lighting. The IALD also maintains partnerships with the IES, the American Institute of Architects (AIA), the International Commission on Illumination (CIE), Institution of Lighting Professionals (ILP), the National Electrical Manufacturers Association (NEMA), and other professional organizations to promote the industry and develop technical standards.

== Lobbying ==
On May 26, 2009, the IALD called upon its members to voice their disapproval of bill set for a vote the following day in the Texas House of Representatives. A last-minute amendment to Texas House Bill 2649 would have required licensure (i.e. as an engineer, architect, landscape architect, or interior designer) to offer lighting-design services directly to the public in Texas. The proposed legislation was successfully defeated.

== The IALD International Lighting Design Awards ==
The IALD International Lighting Design Awards (IALD Awards) is an industry awards program recognizing excellence in architectural lighting design bestowed by the IALD. Held annually, the IALD Awards have been granted to lighting designers and design firms since 1983.

=== Project Submission ===
Design firms submit entries for projects that meet specific eligibility requirements through the IALD website. A panel of volunteer judges reviews all accepted entries through two rounds of blind judging (no knowledge of the submitting firm or individual designers on the project).

=== Judging and Scoring ===
Advancement from the first to the second round is based on evaluating the entry’s submitted short brief and a single-page poster of chosen project images. During the second round, those advancing projects are scored by each judge based on a set of ten discipline criteria. Total averaged scores from the second round (which will range from 0 to 105 points) determine the winners for the year. There is no minimum or maximum number of awards granted.

=== Awards Granted ===
IALD Awards of Excellence (scoring above 88) and IALD Awards of Merit (scoring between 80 and 87.999) are based on points earned for technical and aesthetic design achievement. Recognition in the form of an IALD Special Citation may be given for a particularly innovative aspect of a project's lighting design. The IALD Radiance Award for Excellence in Lighting Design, the top honor of the IALD International Lighting Design Awards, is presented to the project that is judged among all submissions to be the year’s finest example of lighting design excellence (based on the highest point score).

=== Past Award Winners ===
Year	IALD Award of Excellence Winners (Radiance Winner in bold)	IALD Award of Merit Winners
2022 (39th)	Expolight for Synagogue: Babi Yar Holocaust Memorial Center in Kyiv, Ukraine; Erik Selmer for Nidaros Cathedral in Trondheim, Norway; Brandston Partnership Inc. for Humen Transit Oriented Development Exhibition Center in Dongguan, China; Lighting Design Institute of UAD for Xu Wei Art Museum in Shaoxing, Zhejiang; **Beijing Puri Lighting Design for Chamber Chapel in Qingdao, Shandong**; Shanghai ATL Lighting Design for Guanyin Altar in Zhoushan, Zhejiang; Project Lighting Design for Four Seasons Bangkok at Chao Phraya River in Bangkok; Beijing Bamboo Lighting Design for Fusheng Art Gallery in Wuhan, Hubei	Tillotson Design Associates for David Rubenstein Forum, University of Chicago; Arup and Jill Anholt Studio for Sea Change in Lonsdale Quay, North Vancouver; Qlab Sp. z o.o. for Piłsudski Bridge in Kraków; CosmoC Lighting for Lun-Ping Cultural Landscape Park Pavilion in Taoyuan, Taiwan; Brandston Partnership for Chongqing Qiansimen Sales Center in Chongqing; Brandston Partnership for Shanghai Rock Bund in Shanghai; Ning Field Lighting Design Corp for Jiaxing Train Station in Jiaxing, Zhejiang; RDesign International Lighting for Guangming Culture and Art Center in Shenzhen; Michela Mezzavilla reMM Lighting Design + MMAS Lighting Design for Xapo Bank Hall in Gibraltar; Eleftheria Deko & Associates Lighting Design for Acropolis of Athens and Monuments in Athens; Speirs Major for BIO4, Amagerværket in Copenhagen
2021 (38th)	Light Bureau for Kungsträdgården; Lux Populi for NorthConnex; Natalya Koptseva and Vasily Tarasenko for Central Mosque in Shali, Russia; Office for Visual Interaction for Canadian Parliament West Block - Committee Rooms; **Sirius Lighting Office Inc. for Toranomon Hills Business Tower**	Glint Lighting Design for Chongqing Changshou Sales Gallery; LICHT (In-house lighting studio at ICRAVE) and HLB Lighting Design for The David H. Koch Center for Cancer Care at Memorial Sloan Kettering Cancer Center; Light Concept for Sharjah Mosque in Sharjah, United Arab Emirates; Lighting Design International for Harrods Fine Dining in London, England; Lighting Planners Associates for Takanawa Gateway Station; L'Observatoire International for Dwight D. Eisenhower Memorial; Oculus Light Studio for Nitro in Seattle, WA USA; School of Architecture, Tsinghua University and One Lighting Associates (Beijing) for Wang Jing Memorial Hall in Songyang; Schuler Shook for 25 E Washington Lobby in Chicago, IL, USA; Schuler Shook for 600 West Chicago Lobby Renovation in Chicago, IL, USA; Schuler Shook for CME Group in Chicago, IL USA; Schuler Shook for WEGO Lighting Design Co., Ltd. for Starbucks Reserve® Tianjin Riverside 66 Flagship Store; WORKTECHT & Co. for The Ritz-Carlton Nikko
2020 (37th)	**Arup UK for The University of Sheffield Concourse**; AKLD Lighting Design, Ltd. for The Keller Center - University of Chicago Harris School of Public Policy; Fisher Marantz Stone for Vancouver Waterfront Park Grant Street Pier and Plaza; HGA for Tennessee State Museum; Light Bureau for Kistefos - The Twist in Jevnaker, Norway; Speirs Major for Re-Lighting of Interior of Norwich Cathedral; Studio Fractal for Royal Opera House in London, England	18 Degrees for International Presbyterian Church in Ealing, England; Art Light Design Consultants, Inc. for Green Jadeite in Kaohsiung, Taiwan; Dark Light Design for Microsoft Buildings 121 & 122 in Redmond, WA USA; Fisher Marantz Stone for Shanghai Waterfront – 25 Landmarks (in collaboration with seven lighting design firms); J.Y. Lighting Design for La Vie Ltd. Wine & Spirits Merchant in Taipei, Taiwan; Lam Partners for Free Library of Philadelphia; Light Collab for Singapore Buddhist Lodge; Lighting Planners Associates for Nihombashi Mitsukoshi; Lightsphere GmbH for Givaudan Zurich Innovation Center; PritchardPeck Lighting for 160 Spear Street in San Francisco, CA, USA; Sean O’Connor Lighting for RH New York; ZENISK AS for H&M Flagship Store Façade Lighting in Oslo, Norway
2019 (36th)	Cline Bettridge Bernstein Lighting Design for Emerson College Student Dining Center; Office for Visual Interaction for Meixi Urban Helix Changsha; **Lighting Design International for Kimpton Fitzroy**; Lighting Planners Associates for Mt. Fuji Heritage Centre, Shizuoka; Schlaich Bergermann partner for A Family of Bridges for the Town of Riedlingen; Schreiber Studio for London Mithraeum; School of Architecture, Tsinghua University, One Lighting Associates (Beijing) for Lounge Bridge in Shimen Village; Speirs Major for Gasholders London; Susanna Antico Lighting Design Studio for Antwerp's Cathedral and Immediate Surroundings; Tillotson Design Associates for Bloomberg European Headquarters; Tillotson Design Associates for Gateway Arch Museum	ÅF Lighting for Stovnertårnet (The Stovner Tower) Oslo, Norway; artec3 Studio for Centro Botin Cantabria, Spain; Arup Deutschland GmbH for Amorepacific Headquarters; Electrolight (San Francisco) for Rothy's at Fillmore San Francisco, CA; Electrolight (Sydney) for Raku Canberra, Australia; EXP for Washington/Wabash Elevated Train Station; Haberdashery for Amaranthyne; Henderson Engineers for KU Medical Center Health Education Building University of Kansas Medical Center; KSLD EFLA Lighting Design for Scottish Parliament Debating Chamber; School of Architecture, Tsinghua University, One Lighting Associates (Beijing) for Exhibition Halls and Workshops of Rice Barns Wuzhen, Zhejiang, China; Speirs Major, Mulvey & Banani Lighting Inc. for CF Toronto Eaton Centre Bridge; Stantec for BPX Energy Denver, CO
2018 (35th)	HLB Lighting Design for United States Courthouse Los Angeles; **Licht Kunst Licht AG for German Ivory Museum, Erbach**; Licht Kunst Licht AG for HSBC Cafeteria, Düsseldorf; Limari Lighting Design for Bahá’í Temple for South America in Chile; Lighting M Inc. for Ota Civic Hall Ōta, Gunma; Lux Populi for Lakeview Pantry Chicago; Unolai Lighting Design & Associates for New Shanghai Theatre Shanghai	ÅF Lighting for Story Wall Eskilstuna Eskilstuna, Sweden; ÅF Lighting for The Svindersvik Bridge Stockholm, Sweden; Arup for Mathematics: The Winton Gallery, Science Museum London, England UK; Creative Lighting Design & Engineering, LLC for The Ghost Train Shorewood, WI USA; Electrolight for The Urchin, Westfield Chermside, Brisbane; Foster + Partners for Apple Michigan Avenue, Chicago; KGM Architectural Lighting for Hyundai Capital Convention Hall, Seoul; Lighting Design International for Oxford Street Estate in London, England
2017 (34th)	**Beijing United Artists Lighting Design Corp Ltd for Harbin Opera House Interior Lighting Design**; Cline Bettridge Bernstein Lighting Design for Hancher Auditorium, University of Iowa; Cooley Monato Studio for Barneys New York; L’Acte Lumière for Cathédrale Notre-Dame de Strasbourg; Tillotson Design Associates for 599 Lexington Avenue Ground Floor Upgrades New York, NY	Anita Jorgensen Lighting Design for 225 Park Avenue South New York, NY; Buro Happold for 888 Boylston Boston, MA; Electrolight for Corrs Chambers Westgarth Perth, Australia; Light + Design Associates for Debenhams Oxford Street London, England; Lighting Planners Associates for Amanemu Ise-Shima, Japan; Schuler Shook, Ross Barney Architects, Sasaki for Chicago Riverwalk
2016 (33rd)	AUREOLIGHTING for CEPSA Flag Petrol Station in Adanero, Spain; Originator Lighting Design Consultants Inc for Astron Wall in Shenzhen, China; **Tillotson Design Associates for Lincoln Square Synagogue**	Arup for Fulton Center and Sky Reflector-Net; Cooley Monato Studio for NBCUniversal Lobby and Mezzanine Restoration in New York, NY; Electrolight for Sake, Double Bay in Double Bay, Australia; The Flaming Beacon for Park Hyatt Sanya Sunny Bay Resort in Sanya, China; Iris Associates Inc for Tokyu Harvest Club Kyoto Takagamine & Viala in Kyoto, Japan; Iwai Lumimedia Design for The Heisei Chishinkan Wing of the Kyoto National Museum: Façade; Lighting Planners Associates for Aman Tokyo; Lighting Planners Associates for “Minna No Mori” Gifu Media Cosmos in Gifu, Japan*; Steensen Varming for Australian War Memorial; Toh Design for FARMUS Kijimadaira in Nagano, Japan; WORKTECHT CORPORATION for The Ritz-Carlton, Kyoto; Zeve Muhendislik ve Aydinlatma San. Tic. Ltd. Sti. for Kirikkale Merkez Nur Mosque in Kirikkale, Turkey
2015 (32nd)	**BUME Perfect Illumination Design & Engineering Company, Stufish Entertainment Architects and Steven Chilton Studio for The Han Show Theatre in Wuhan City, Hubei, China**; Fisher Marantz Stone for The National September 11 Memorial Museum at the World Trade Center; Ningbo Yongqi Lighting Co Ltd for Zhenhai Culture and Art Center; studioFRACTAL Lighting Design for Kings Cross Square, London	Arup for Northrop Auditorium Renovation; Auerbach Glasow French for California Palace of the Legion of Honor, Salon Dore, San Francisco; Available Light for U.S. National Library Rotunda for the Charters of Freedom, Washington, D.C.; Bernstein Lighting Design for Stapleton Branch Library in New York City; Buro Happold for The Brown Institute for Media Innovation at the Columbia University Graduate School of Journalism; GIA Equation in Knightsbridge Estate, London; Licht Kunst Licht AG for Art Museum Ahrenshoop; Lighting M Inc in Kyobashi Child Institution; Pfarre Lighting Design for Das Gerber, Stuttgart, Germany; Speirs Major for Queen Elizabeth Park, London
2014 (31st)	**Speirs Major for 'In Lumine Tuo' Dom Tower, Dom Church and Dom Square in Utrecht, The Netherlands**; Akari+Design Associates for Branz Koshien in Nishimiya, Japan; Biad Zheng Jianwei Lighting Studio for Hanjie Wanda Plaza in Hubei, China; Maurice Brill Lighting Design Ltd for Heydar Aliyev Cultural Center; Lighteam for Memorial to the Victims of Violence in Chapultepec Park, Mexico City, Mexico; Tillotson Design Associates for Red Bull Music Academy in New York; Sean O’Connor Lighting for Venture Capital Office Building in Menlo Park, CA USA	Electrolight for 171 Collins Street, Melbourne, Australia; Oculus Lighting Studio for AKA Beverly Hills; Izumi Yayoshi Lighting Design Co Ltd for Centennial Anniversary Hall in Sensuicho, Fukuoka, Japan; Mindseye for St Moritz Church in Augsburg, Germany; Studio 1Thousand for Starlight in New York
2013 (30th)	Electrolight for Crown Towers Eastern Entry Melbourne, Australia; Lighting Design Collective for Silo 468 Helsinki, Finland; **Pfarré Lighting Design for Hafencity-University Subway Station**	Electrolight for Sneakerology Sydney, Australia; Hga Architects + Engineers for Lakewood Cemetery Garden Mausoleum Minneapolis; L'observatoire International for Cite Du Surf Et De L'ocean Biarritz, France; Shanghai Grandar Light Art & Technology Co. for Kunming Changshui International Airport; Sirius Lighting Office Inc for Tokyo Skytree; Speirs Major for Burlington Arcade London
2012 (29th)	Cannon Design for Banner MD Anderson Cancer Center Lantern Of Hope Gilbert, AZ USA; **Daglicht & Vorm for Broken Light Rotterdam, Netherlands**; Fisher Marantz Stone for The National September 11 Memorial; Lam Partners for United States Institute Of Peace Washington, DC; Light Cibles for Lighting Beirut Architecture Beirut, Lebanon; Lightdesign Inc for Futako Tamagawa Rise Tokyo, Japan; artec3 Studio for Lagares Showroom Girona, Spain	DPA Lighting Design for Harrow School Chapel Harrow, Middlesex, England; forlights for Hatoya 3 Bldg Tokyo, Japan; Lighting Planners Associates Inc for St Regis Osaka; Focus Lighting for Yotel New York; Randy Burkett Lighting Design Inc for Martin Luther King Jr. Memorial Washington; Smithgroup JJR for Chandler City Hall Exterior Chandler, AZ USA
2011 (28th)	ÅF - Hansen & Henneberg for Helsingborg Waterfront; ARUP Lighting for Eleanor And Wilson Greatbatch Pavilion; Buro Happold for Sperone Westwater Gallery New York; The Flaming Beacon for Cha Cha Thé Taipei, Taiwan; **Licht Kunst Licht Ag for Telekombridge Bonn, Germany**; Lighting Planners Associates for Aman New Delhi	Enrique Krahe Arquitectos/Architecten for Municipal Theater Of Zafra; Focus Lighting for Science Storms At The Museum Of Science And Industry Chicago; Lighteam for Hotel Encanto Acapulco, Mexico; Peter Gluck And Partners + Lux Populi for The East Harlem School New York; Shanghai Grandar Light Art & Technology Co Ltd for Expo Axis At The World Expo Shanghai; Sirius Lighting Office Inc for Nikkei Head Office Tokyo, Japan; Tillotson Design Associates for Dee and Charles Wyly Theatre Dallas; UNstudio for Art Collector's Loft New York
2010 (27th)	ÅF - Hansen & Henneberg for The Nyborg Bridges Denmark; Arc Light Design for Chipotle Mexican Grill - New Concept Prototype New York City; Arup Lighting for New Acropolis Museum Athens, Greece; Ljusarkitektur for Vastra Eriksberg Crane And Dock Sweden; RDG Planning & Design for First National Bank Metro Crossing - Glass Feature Wall Council Bluffs, IA USA; Speirs Major for Infinity Bridge, Stockton-on-Tees; **Speirs Major for Sheikh Zayed Bin Sultan Al Nahyan Mosque, Exterior Lighting Abu Dhabi, UAE**	architectural lighting solutions (ALS) for Joyeria D (D Jewellery Shop) Pamplona, Spain; Clanton & Associates Inc for USGBC Headquarters Washington; Fisher Marantz Stone for Chanel Encore Las Vegas; Fisher Marantz Stone for Private San Francisco Residence; Lam Partners Inc for Stephen M. Ross School Of Business At The University Of Michigan; Licht Kunst Licht AG for Novartis Campus, Maki Office Building Basel, Switzerland; PointOfView for Epping to Chatswood rail link; Macquarie Park & University stations North Ryde, Sydney Australia; Schwinghammer Lighting for Auto Storage Facility Westchester; Speirs Major for Sands Bethworks Retained Edifices, Bethlehem; Steensen Varming Australia for The National Portrait Gallery Canberra, Australia; The Flaming Beacon for The PuLi Hotel and Spa Shanghai, China; Total Lighting Solutions for Canada Line Rapid Transit System Vancouver, Canada
2009 (26th)	Auerbach Glasow French for The Metropolitan Museum of Art, The Wrightsman Galleries for French Decorative Arts New York; Lighting Design International for Limerick House Spa Limerick, Ireland; **Speirs Major for Entrance and Atrium, 3 More London Riverside**	artec3 for Plaza del Torico (Torico Square) Teruel, Spain; artec3 for Torre del Agua (Water Tower) Zaragoza, Spain; Grandar Lightscape Co Ltd for LED Lighting Art of the WaterCube Beijing, China; Licht Kunst Licht AG for Federal State Parliament in Vaduz, Princedom of Liechtenstein; Licht Kunst Licht AG for Krischanitz Building, Campus Novartis, Basel, Switzerland; Licht Kunst Licht AG for Novartis Campus Reception Building and Underground Car Park, Basel, Switzerland; Lumina Group for Pertamina Gas Station Indonesia; MCLA Inc. for L2 Lounge Washington, DC; Office for Visual Interaction for The New York Times Building, Facade Lighting; pfarré lighting design for WGV Cafeteria Stuttgart, Germany; Speirs Major for BBC Scotland Headquarters, Glasgow, Scotland; Speirs Major for Sheikh Zayed Bin Sultan, Al Nahyan Mosque Interior Abu Dhabi, UAE; WSP for New Beijing Poly Plaza
2008 (25th)	Derek Porter Studio for Kansas City Convention Center Ballroom Expansion; Horton Lees Brogden Lighting Design for Creative Artists Agency Headquarters Century City, California; **Speirs Major for Barajas International Airport Madrid, Spain**; Speirs Major for Re-Lighting of the Interior of St Paul's Cathedral; Speirs Major for The Sackler Crossing Royal Botanic Gardens, Kew, Surrey; Steensen Varming for Ian Thorpe Aquatic Centre Sydney, Australia; Takeshi Konishi + Architectural Lighting Group for Ginzan Onsen Fujiya: Ginzan Hot Spring Yamagata, Japan; Tillotson Design Associates for School of American Ballet at Lincoln Center New York City	Cline Bettridge Bernstein Lighting Design for Renée & Henry Segerstrom Concert Hall; Lam Partners Inc. for Billy Wilder Theater at the UCLA Hammer Museum; Mayumi Kondo Lighting Design for House in Komae Tokyo, Japan; Speirs Major for Thermae Bath Spa Bath, United Kingdom
2007 (24th)	Abdi Ahsan for ERHA Clinic Kelapa Gading Jakarta, Indonesia; LichtVision GmbH for Information Center in the Central Memorial for the Murdered Jews of Europe Berlin, Germany; Lighting Design International for Manchester235 Manchester, England; **Lighting Planners Associates Inc. for Chino Cultural Complex Nagano, Japan**; pfarré lighting design for Manufactum Munich, Germany; Takenaka Corporation for AGC Monozukuri (Quality Manufacturing) Training Center	Cline Bettridge Bernstein Lighting Design, Inc. for 7 World Trade Center New York; LichtVision GmbH for Berlin Main Station, Underground Platforms & Shopping Areas; Derek Porter Studio for Greenville Liberty Bridge; Gilberto Franco, Carlos Fortes for Luz Railway Station, Museum of the Portuguese Language São Paulo; Licht Kunst Licht AG for Uniqa Tower Vienna, Austria; Lighting Planners Associates Inc. for Changi Airport, Terminal 2 Upgrade; Pamela Hull Wilson for The Blue Pool House Dallas; pfarré lighting design for Public Passage Munich, Germany; Sachi Takanaga for Residential Lobby, Diana Garden Hiroo Tokyo, Japan; Sachs Morgan Studio for Temple -El New York; Sean O'Connor Associates for Park Hyatt Philadelphia at the Bellevue; Yarnell Associates, LLC for UMB Bank, Shawnee Branch
2006 (23rd)	Arup Lighting (Amsterdam) Louis Vuitton Global Lighting Design, Madrid; Arup Lighting (UK) for High Museum of Art, Atlanta, Georgia; Cosentini Lighting Design for 111 South Wacker Drive lobby, Chicago; Derek Porter Studio for Flex Systems Topeka, Kansas; **Focus Lighting for Tourneau Time Dome, Las Vegas**; Lam Partners for David L. Lawrence Convention Center, Pittsburgh; Lighting Planners Associates for Hiroshima City Naka Incineration Plant; Smith Group for Detroit Athletic Club; Stephen Bernstein, Marty Salzberg for Sydney & Walda Besthoff Sculpture Garden New Orleans	Arc Light Design for Geneva Intercontinental Hotel; BDP Lighting for The Almshouses, Princesshay Exeter; Claudio Ramos, Jody Pritchard for Four Seasons Penthouse San Francisco; Cline Bettridge Bernstein Lighting Design for Atlantic Terminal, Brooklyn; Cosentini Lighting Design for Bellevue Hospital New Ambulatory Care Center New York; Cosentini Lighting Design for Bank of America Trading Floor Charlotte; Derek Porter Studio for Briar Cliff Residence Kansas; Kling & Associates for Charlotte Douglas International Airport; Lighting Planners Associates for Kyoto State Guest House; Monica Luz Lobo Lighting Design Studio for Igreja de Sao Francisco de Assis Belo Horizonte; pfarré lighting design for Globus Department Store Zürich; PSLAB for Waterlemon Beirut
2005 (22nd)	**Arup Lighting (Amsterdam) for Galleria West, Seoul, Korea**; L-Plan for Berlin Medical Society; Lightplanun for St. Franziskus, Regensburg; SBLD Studio for Lath and Plaster Showroom, New York; Schuler Shook for Crown Fountain, Chicago; Speirs Major for Bridge of Aspiration, London; Speirs Major for Pulrose Power Station, Isle of Man	Archingegno for Adotta, Vicenza, Italy; Architecture & Light for Stone & Youngberg, San Francisco; Artecluminotecnia for Restoration of Paseo del Ovalo, Teruel, Spain; Auviz Lumina Plano Pt for Monumen Nasional, Jakarta, Indonesia; Cline Bettridge Bernstein Lighting Design for Frost Bank Tower, Austin, TX; Cline Bettridge Bernstein Lighting Design for Pier 1 Imports Headquarters, Fort Worth, TX; dpa lighting consultants for Hilton Hotel, Athens, Greece; dpa lighting design for Bullring WCs, Birmingham, England; Fisher Marantz Stone for Jubilee Church, Rome, Italy; Focus Lighting for Carlos Miele, New York, NY; Focus Lighting for Semiramis Hotel, Athens, Greece; Light this! Architectural Theatrical Lighting Design for Montage, Inc., Boston, MA; Roger Narboni for Rio–Antirrio Bridge, Corinth Gulf, Greece; Schuler Shook for DeVos Performance Hall Renovation, Grand Rapids, MI; Visual Terrain for Morongo Casino, Resort & Spa, near Palm Springs, CA
2004 (21st)	**Architectural Lighting Design Taipei, Taiwan for CKS International Airport, Terminal 1 Lighting Renovation, Tao-Yuan, Taiwan**; Fisher Marantz Stone for MetLife Building, New York; Maurice Brill Lighting Design for Finsbury Avenue Square, London	Cline Bettridge Bernstein Lighting Design for Brown Fine Arts Center at Smith College, Northampton, MA; L-Plan Lighting Design for Post Tower, Bonn, Germany; Lichtplanung for BMW Group Autocenter, Munich; The Lighting Practice for Galleria Mall Renovation and Expansion, Houston Texas
2003 (20th)	**Available Light for the MIT Building 7 Renovation, an MIT landmark in Cambridge, Massachusetts**; Carpenter/Norris Consulting for Solar Pipe Light (SLP) in Washington D.C.; Cline Bettridge Bernstein Lighting Design for School of the International Center of Photography in New York; CWI Lighting Design for Chung-Tai Chan Temple in Pu-Li, Na-Tou County, Taiwan	Arc Light Design for Deutsch Inc. in Los Angeles, CA; Belzner Holmes Architektur Licht Bühne for ERCO P3 Warehouse in Nordrhein-Westfalen, Germany; Brandston Partnership, Inc. for Country Music Hall of Fame and Museum in Nashville, TN; Brilliant Lighting Design for Façade/Show Illumination of the Golden Moon Hotel/Casino in Philadelphia, MS; chroma33 (Taiwan) for M39/40 in Taipei, Taiwan; Fisher Marantz Stone for Korean Development Bank in Seoul, South Korea; Fisher Marantz Stone for South Court of the New York Public Library; George Sexton Associates for The Modern Art Museum of Fort Worth; Schuler Shook for First Presbyterian Church, Evanston, IL; Schuler Shook for Minneapolis Convention Center Expansion, Minneapolis, MN; Speirs Major for Magna Science Adventure Centre in Templeborough, Rotherham
2002 (19th)	Jonathan Speirs and Associates Ltd for Gateshead Millennium Bridge Gateshead, Tyne and Wear, England	Randy Burkett Lighting Design for Jefferson National Expansion Memorial Gateway Arch St. Louis, MO, USA; Focus Lighting for Morimoto Restaurant Philadelphia; James Carpenter Design Associates, Inc., Tanteri Associates for Luminous Arc for San Diego Convention Center; Johnson Schwinghammer Lighting Consultants for Qiora Store and Spa Madison Avenue, New York; Johnson Schwinghammer Lighting Design for MoMa Design Store, SoHo New York
2001 (18th)	Fisher Marantz Stone for American Museum of Natural History Rose Center for Earth and Space New York	Cline Bettridge Bernstein Lighting Design for Raleigh/Durham Airport Parking Structure Raleigh/Durham, NC, USA; Horton Lees Brogden Lighting Design for San Francisco City Hall; Jonathan Speirs and Associates Ltd for Alexander Graham Bell House, British Telecom Regional Headquarters Edinburgh; George Sexton Associates for Herz Jesu Kirche(Heart of Jesus Church) Munich; Lam Partners for Module VII Chiller Plant University of Pennsylvania; Speirs Major for Millennium Dome London, England; Uwe Belzner, Stefan Hofmann for Fußgängerbrücke (Pedestrian Bridge) Innenhafen Duisburg, Nordrhein-Westfalen, Germany
2000 (17th)		Fisher Marantz Stone for Radio City Music Hall Restoration New York; Fisher Marantz Renfro Stone for New York Public Library Rose Main Reading Room; Lam Partners for Northeastern University Multi-Faith Spiritual Center Boston; Michael Simpson Lighting Design Partnership, Ltd. for Albert Memorial Kensington Gardens London; Ross De Alessi Lighting Design for Downtown Helsinki Esplanade and Side Streets Helsinki; Speirs Major for Zollverein Kokerei Essen, Germany; Thompson + Sears, LLC for Rodin Museum Pavilion/ Samsung Seoul, Korea
1999 (16th)	chroma33 Architectural Lighting Design for Chung Lien Bank Taipei; Fisher Marantz Stone for Chek Lap Kok Airport Hong Kong; Lighting Design Partnership for Erasmus Bridge Rotterdam; Takenaka Corporation for Sagawa Art Museum Shiga, Japan	Cline Bettridge Bernstein Lighting Design for Estuarine Habitats & Coastal Fisheries Center Lafayette, Louisiana; Fisher Marantz Stone for New Jersey Performing Arts Center Newark; Lighting Service Inc. for Hall of Bio-Diversity, American Museum of Natural History New York; Roeder Design for Margaret and Trammell Crow Collection of Asian Art Dallas, Texas; Ross De Alessi Lighting Design for MGM Grand Gateway of Entertainment Las Vegas; Schuler Shook for Alexander Calder’s Flamingo Federal Plaza, Chicago
1998 (15th)	Fisher Marantz Renfro Stone for Miho Museum Shigaraki, Japan	DPA Lighting Consultants for Charterhouse Memorial Chapel Charterhouse School, Godalming, Surrey, England; Fisher Marantz Renfro Stone for Byzantine Fresco Chapel Houston; Motoko Ishii Lighting Design for Yamaguchi International Trade and Culture Center Yamaguchi, Japan; PHA Lighting Design for Hong Kong Convention and Exhibit Centre Hong Kong

=== Special Citation ===
2021	Expolight for Boulevard of Arts in Dnipro, Ukraine “Use of Lighting Technology for Creative Engagement”; Speirs Major for K11 Art and Cultural Centre in Hong Kong “Lighting Façade Integration as a Seamless Architecture Element”
2020	Lam Partners for Boston City Hall Renovation; Thurlow Small, Inc. for Rain in Washington, DC USA
2018	Skira for Roundabout Pula in Croatia "Collaborating on An Iconic Civic Landmark"; RTLD Lighting Design for Sir Joan Ibiza in Spain "Synergy of Light and Material"
2016	Ramboll Lighting for Wall of Dreams in Valby, Denmark "Social Involvement Expressed Through Light"
2015	Claudia Paz Lighting Studio for Light Garden, Lima, Peru "Provoking Interactive Play in a Social Context"
2014	artec3 for BruumRuum! in Barcelona, Spain "Intuitive, Interactive Lighting Experience"; Asa studio for Dragon Bridge in Da Nang City, Vietnam "Whimsical, Well-Crafted Multimedia Experience Communicating National + Religious Identity"; Lightdesign Inc for Light for NICU at Nagoya Daini Red Cross Hospital in Nagoya, Japan "Highly Responsive Design for Delicate Needs of a Critical Care Environment"; Uchihara Creative Lighting Design Inc for Wall Illumination Fantasy of Piole Himeji "Elegant Integration of Indirect Dynamic Lighting"

== See also ==
=== Notable members ===
- Helen Diemer
- Kaoru Mende

=== Related organizations ===
- Chartered Institution of Building Services Engineers (CIBSE)
- Professional Lighting Designers' Association (PLDA)
