= Professional Lighting Designers' Association =

Disbanded association of lighting designers

- Abbreviation: PLDA
- Formation: October 1994; 32 years ago
- Founded at: Frankfurt, Germany
- Headquarters: Gütersloh, Germany
- Formerly called: European Lighting Designers' Association

The Professional Lighting Designers' Association (PLDA), was an international association of architectural lighting designers headquartered in Gütersloh, Germany.

The PLDA was previously known as the European Lighting Designers' Association (ELDA), which was founded in 1993 or 1994 in Frankfurt, Germany. Starting sometime in 2001 or 2002, the abbreviation ELDA+ was used to indicate the organisation was "moving forward, progressing, expanding, improving and generally going beyond what the association has been until now."

The ELDA+ changed its name to the Professional Lighting Designers' Association (PLDA) in early 2007. It also transitioned from the ELDAplus.org web domain name to PLD-A.org accordingly that year.

The PLDA participated in an international credentialing task force assembled by the International Association of Lighting Designers (IALD) in 2010 to determine the feasibility of a global certification, ultimately leading to the creation of the Certified Lighting Designer (CLD) credential.

The PLDA disbanded in 2014. Longtime collaborator VIA-Verlag launched the similarly named PLD Alliance in 2016.

== Membership ==
There were three types of voting member (Fellow, Professional, or Associate) and three kinds of non-voting member (Design, Student, or Affiliate). These classifications were defined in the membership application form.

== Publications ==
The official magazine of the PLDA was Professional Lighting Design (PLD), published by VIA-Verlag since 1998. PLD was shared by the PLDA and IALD from 2003 or 2004 into 2006.

The magazine's domain name was PLDplus.com from 2002 to 2005. It transitioned to PLD-M.com in 2011. PLD was also available at VIA-Internet.com in 2002, as well as at VIA-Verlag.com from 2003 or earlier into 2013.

== Events ==
The PLDA held workshops nearly every year from 1999 through 2011. Separately, PLDA offered two conferences—Light Focus and Vox Juventa—nearly every year from 2005 through 2010.

Organised by the PLD magazine in collaboration with the PLDA, the first Professional Lighting Design Convention (PLDC) was held in London from 24 to 27 October 2007. The plenary session at the end of the convention released a Declaration of the Official Establishment of the Architectural Lighting Design Profession. Subsequent PLDCs were organised by VIA-Verlag (in collaboration with PLDA in the early years) in 2009, 2011, 2013, 2015, 2017, 2018, and 2019.

== See also ==
- Illuminating Engineering Society (IES)
- Institution of Lighting Professionals (ILP)
- International Commission on Illumination (CIE)
- Society of Light and Lighting (SLL) in the Chartered Institution of Building Services Engineers (CIBSE)
