= Helen Diemer =

Helen Diemer is an architectural lighting designer and the former president of The Lighting Practice, a lighting design firm based in Philadelphia. Diemer graduated from Pennsylvania State University with a degree in architectural engineering. She worked as an electrical engineer before joining The Lighting Practice in 1994.

Diemer previously served as President of the International Association of Lighting Designers. She contributed to the lighting industry through her involvement as chair of the International Association of Lighting Designers' Energy Committee and played a role in developing the lighting energy requirements of ASHRAE/IESNA Standard 90.1. Additionally, she was recognized with the inaugural SMPS Philadelphia Honoring Legends Award, which acknowledged her influential role in the industry. Diemer has also supported educational initiatives for students in architectural engineering, including contributions to the creation of student support funds.

In 2023, Diemer retired from her role as president of The Lighting Practice.

== Notable Projects ==
- Avenue of the Arts
- Nemours/Alfred I. duPont Hospital for Children
- Children's Hospital of Philadelphia Roberts Center for Pediatric Research
