= William M.C. Lam =

Architectural lighting designer

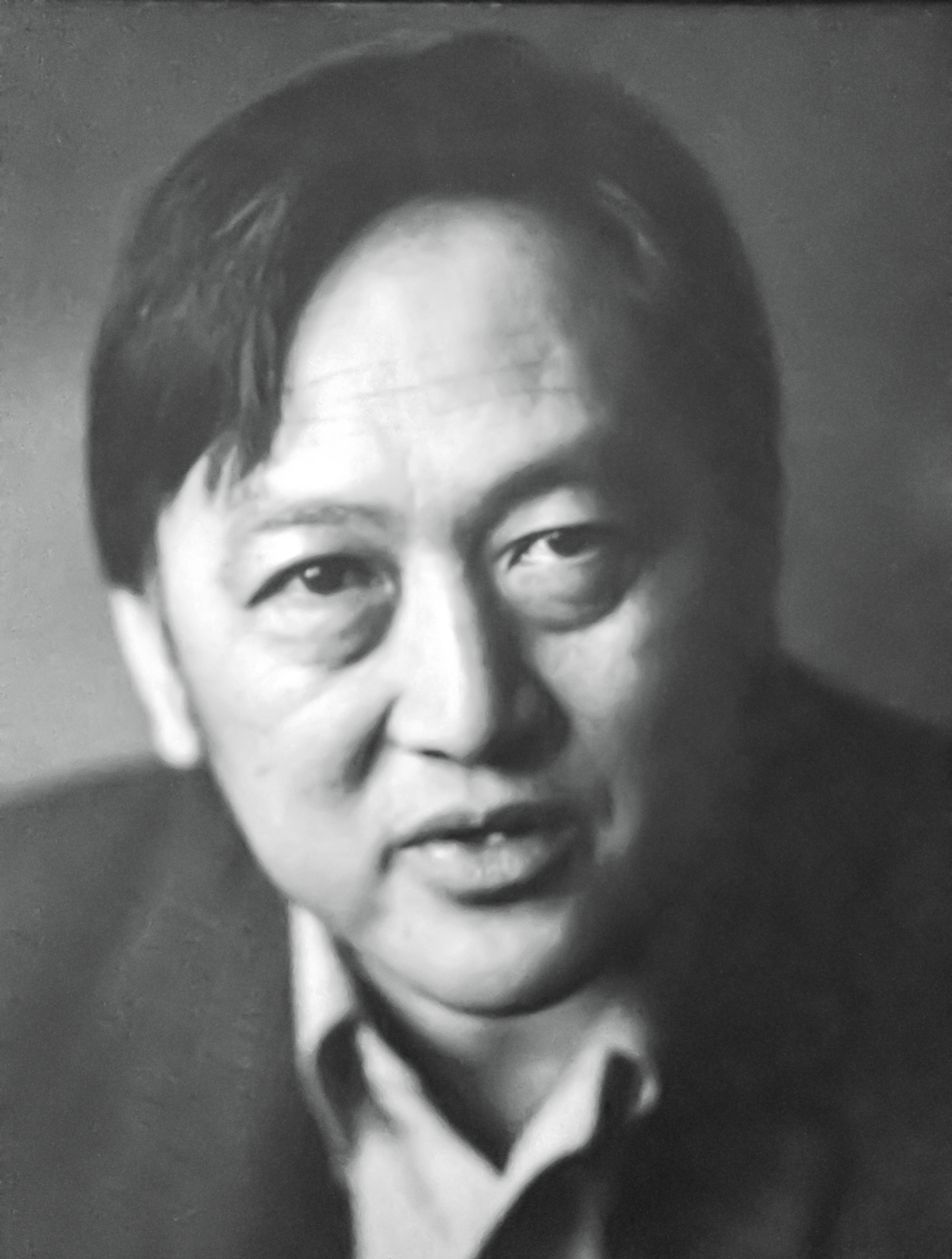
- Bill Lam, c1980
- Born: 1924; Honolulu, Hawaii, U.S.
- Died: 2012 (aged 87–88); Cambridge, Massachusetts, U.S.
- Education: Massachusetts Institute of Technology (B.Arch, 1949)
- Occupations: Architect, lighting designer, author
- Known for: Architectural lighting design; daylighting; perception-based design
- Notable work: Perception and Lighting as Formgivers for Architecture, Sunlighting as Formgiver for Architecture

William "Bill" Ming Cheong Lam (1924–2012) was an American architectural lighting designer known for integration of lighting into architecture, and advocated for design-focused lighting standards in opposition to purely quantitative approaches. He began his career as a lighting manufacturer before establishing a lighting design consulting practice and contributing to over 2000 projects throughout his career. Billed as 'America's Foremost lighting expert' by his publisher McGraw-Hill, Lam authored several influential articles and books on lighting design, including Perception and Lighting as Formgivers for Architecture and Sunlighting as Formgivers for Architecture.

== Early life and education ==
Lam was born in Honolulu, Hawaii in 1924. He graduated from Punahou School in 1941, and was admitted into MIT's School of Architecture that fall. Following the Pearl Harbor bombing, Lam enlisted in the U.S. Army Air Force, serving as a B-25 bomber pilot with the 13th EAF in the Southwest Pacific campaign where he flew 37 bombing missions. He returned to MIT after World War 2, and graduated in 1949.

== Career ==
=== Lighting manufacturing ===
Lam established Lam Workshop after graduating from MIT, and quickly became a well-known manufacturer of modern lighting. The company's advertisements featured the LL-100 floor lamp. The lamp, along with a wooden coffee table, were included in MoMA's Good Design exhibit. In 1954, Lam Workshop gained further recognition for using vacuum formed plastics for lighting fixtures. Lam patented a number of fixture designs under the company's updated name, Lam, Inc.

=== Architectural lighting design ===
Lam stepped away from manufacturing and returned to architectural design in 1959, when he established the lighting design consultancy William Lam Associates. In 1963 he participated in the Master Planning of Boston's Government Center. At that time he became involved in the design for the Washington DC Metro with Harry Weese. The project would become a career-defining milestone. Lam collaborated on many projects with Weese, as well as with other notable architects throughout his career, including Walter Gropius, Gordon Bunshaft at SOM, Arthur Erickson, Carl Koch & Associates, Verner Johnson, and John C. Portman Jr. Arthur Erickson built, as his first project in the United States, a summer cottage for Lam and his family in Cotuit Massachusetts on Cape Cod in 1969. In the 1980s, Lam brought in younger partners and changed the firm name to Lam Partners Inc. He retired from Lam Partners Inc in 1995, maintaining a small consulting business to pursue projects of special interest until his death in 2012.

== Publications ==
Early into his consulting career, Lam published a four-part series of articles on lighting design in architectural record titled "Lighting For Architecture". The articles were popular, influencing the magazine to publish the series as a special reprint. Elements of the text were quoted in a contemporaneous physics textbook. In 1967 the NECA published Electrical Design Guidelines that included Excerpts from part 1 "Lighting: Design or Accident." In 1965, Lam followed up Lighting for Architecture with "The Lighting of Cities," a two part series, also in Architectural Record. In 1966, the New York State University Construction Fund commissioned MIT, under the direction of Dr. Albert G. H. Dietz, Professor of Building Engineering, and Lam to serve as principal consultant, in preparation for a conference on The Luminous Environment. The research ultimately became the text "An Approach to the Design of the Luminous Environment (1976)." He also assisted in developing the Massachusetts lighting energy code.

=== Formgivers for Architecture ===
Lam published Perception and Lighting as Formgivers for Architecture in 1977, edited by Chris Ripman. The text was an immediate success, becoming a popular reference for Architects, widely quoted in textbooks and periodicals. In the book, Lam argued that good lighting should meet basic human needs like orientation, safety, and stimulation—not just provide high, even light levels. He challenged industry standards that prioritized brightness over usefulness. Though initially criticized by utilities promoting excessive light use, his ideas gained traction after the oil crisis prompted a shift toward energy efficiency.

Lam was also a proponent of designing with daylight. He published "Sunlighting as Formgiver for Architecture (1986) to explain various methods of daylighting design through project case studies.

== Teaching ==
Lam taught lighting design at guest lectured at many institutions, including Clemson University, Boston Architectural Center (now College), Harvard Graduate School of Design, Yale, and MIT. Harvard Graduate School of Design Loeb Library maintains an archive of Lam's teaching materials.

== Awards and recognition ==
- Architectural Lighting Reader's Choice Award (1990)
- Institute Honor for Collaborative Achievement from the American Institute of Architects (2000)
- Fellow of the International Association of Lighting Designers
- Architectural Lighting Hall of Fame (2001)

== Bibliography ==
- "Lighting For Architecture" Architectural Record, (1960–1961), ASIN B0007EG5MQ
- "The Lighting of Cities." Architectural Record (1965)
- An Approach to the Design of the Luminous Environment: Albany, NY. State University Construction Fund (1976)
- The Effects of Light on Health: A Review and Assessment (1976)
- Perception and Lighting as Formgivers for Architecture: McGraw-Hill Inc. (1977) ASIN B0007EG5MQ
- Sunlighting as Formgiver for Architecture: Van Nostrand Reinhold (1986) ISBN 0442259417

== Notable projects ==
- Washington DC Metro, Harry Weese
- San Diego Convention Center, Erikson
- Government Service Insurance System Headquarters in Manila, The Philippines (TAC)
- Cambridge Common, Carol Johnson
- Hyatt Recency Hotel, San Francisco, John Portman
- John Joseph Moakley United States Courthouse
- Place Bonaventure, Montreal
- Boston Museum of Science, West Wing
- Canadian Center for the Performing Arts, Ottawa
- Central United Methodist Church, Milwaukee
- British Columbia | Government Center
