= Rookery Building =

Office building in Chicago, Illinois

- U.S. National Register of Historic Places
- U.S. National Historic Landmark
- Chicago Landmark
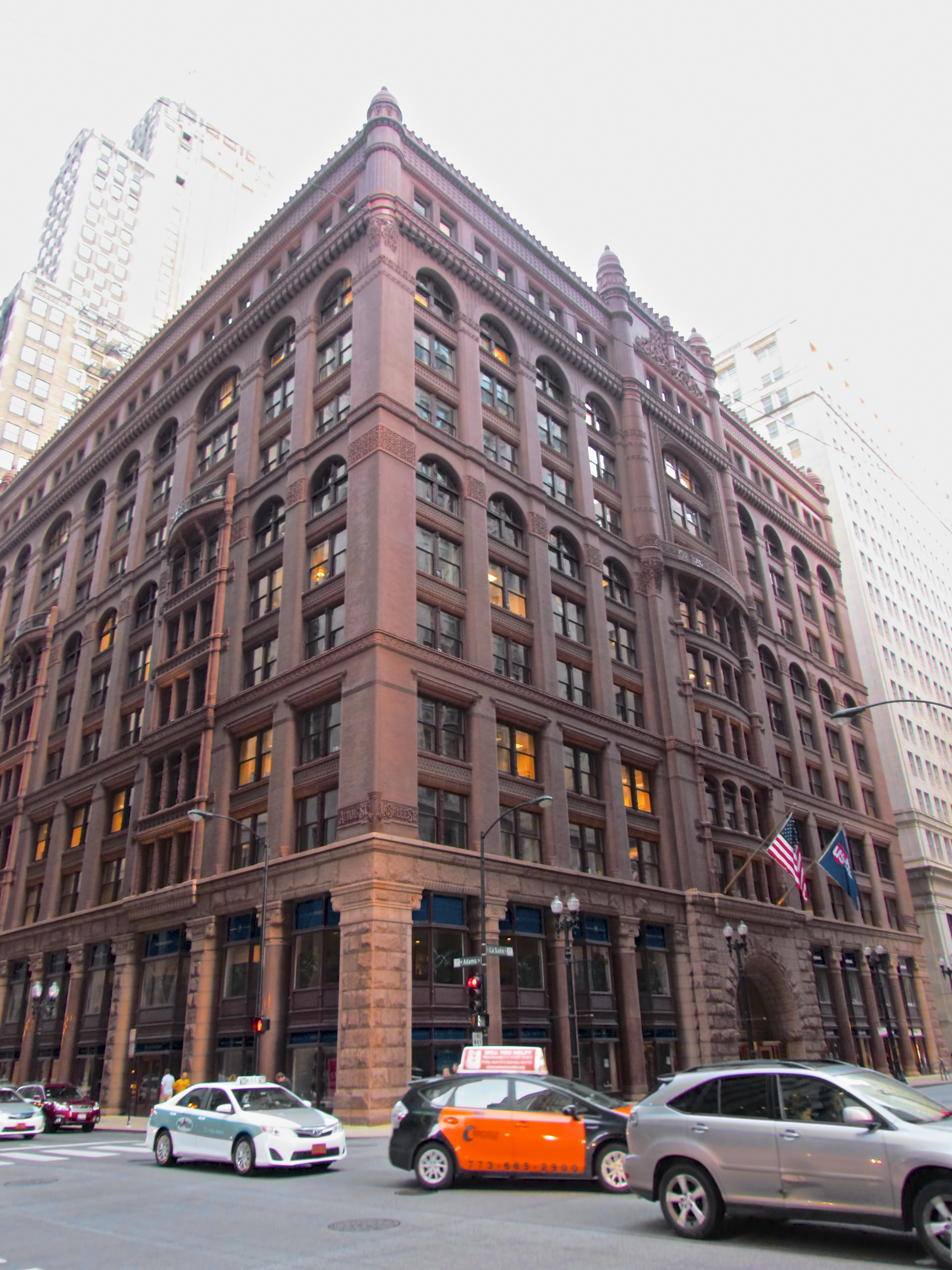
- The building pictured in 2014

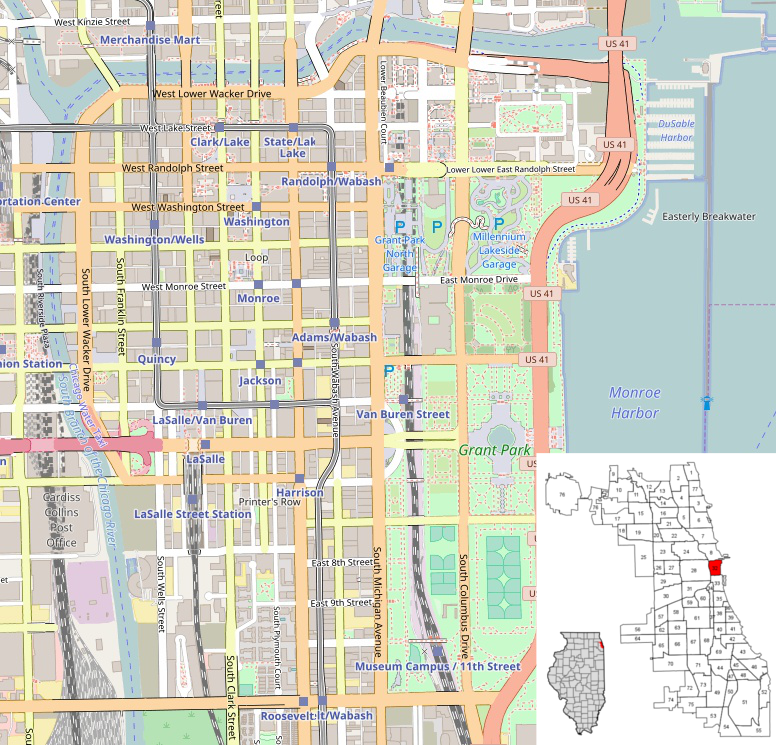
- Location within Chicago Loop Location within Illinois Location within the United States
- Location: 209 South LaSalle Street; Chicago, Illinois
- Coordinates: 41°52′44.7″N 87°37′55.6″W
- Built: 1888
- Architects: Burnham & Root; Frank Lloyd Wright; William Drummond; et al.
- Architectural style: Chicago school with Moorish, Byzantine, Venetian and Romanesque motifs
- NRHP reference No.: 70000238

Significant dates
- Added to NRHP: April 17, 1970
- Designated NHL: May 15, 1975
- Designated CHICL: July 5, 1972

The Rookery Building is a historic office building at 209 South LaSalle Street in the Loop community area of downtown Chicago, Illinois, United States. Completed by architects Daniel Burnham and John Wellborn Root of Burnham and Root in 1888, it is considered one of their masterpiece buildings, and was once the location of their offices. The building is 181 feet (55 m) in height, twelve stories tall, and is considered the oldest standing high-rise in Chicago. It features exterior load-bearing walls and an interior steel frame. Inside is a light court, which illuminates a two-story atrium lobby with ornamental stairs. The building is designated a Chicago Landmark, and it is listed on the National Register of Historic Places as a National Historic Landmark.

Edward C. Waller agreed to lease the site in 1885 for 99 years and hired Burnham and Root to design the building. The lobby was remodeled between 1905 and 1907 by Frank Lloyd Wright, and Wright assistant William Drummond remodeled the structure in 1931. The building was sold in 1982 to Continental Illinois, which cleaned the facade and resold it in 1989 to Baldwin Development. From 1989 to 1992, the lobby was restored to Wright's design. The building was resold twice in the 2000s; following the latter sale, the building was renovated yet again in the 2010s.

== Architecture ==
The Rookery is located at 209 South LaSalle Street in the Loop community area of downtown Chicago, Illinois, United States. It was built by the architectural partnership of Daniel H. Burnham and John Wellborn Root, known as Burnham and Root. The building, designed in the Chicago School architectural tradition, is one of the few results of their partnership that is still standing. While much of the Loop's 19th-century architecture has been demolished, the Rookery has been preserved and renovated over the years.

In the architectural boom that followed the Great Chicago Fire, architects in what would become the Chicago School competed with each other to create the world's first true skyscrapers. In their design for the building, Burnham and Root mixed modern building techniques, such as metal framing, fireproofing, elevators and plate glass, with traditional ones, such as brick facades and elaborate ornamentation. At the same time, they intended their buildings to be commercially successful. As the master artisan, Root drew upon a variety of influences in designing the interior and exterior spaces, including Moorish, Byzantine, Venetian and Romanesque motifs.

=== Facade ===
The Rookery Building rises 12 stories. The marble, granite, terracotta, and brick facade of the building is a combination of Roman Revival and Queen Anne styles that embraced Richardsonian Romanesque architecture. The facade is largely tinted in a reddish-brown hue. The lower two stories are clad in rough-faced granite, with columns made of red granite, while the upper stories are clad with brick. Thick blocks are used at the lower stories to give the facade the impression of sturdiness. Birds are carved into the facade near the entrance, an allusion to the building's name.

=== Structural features ===
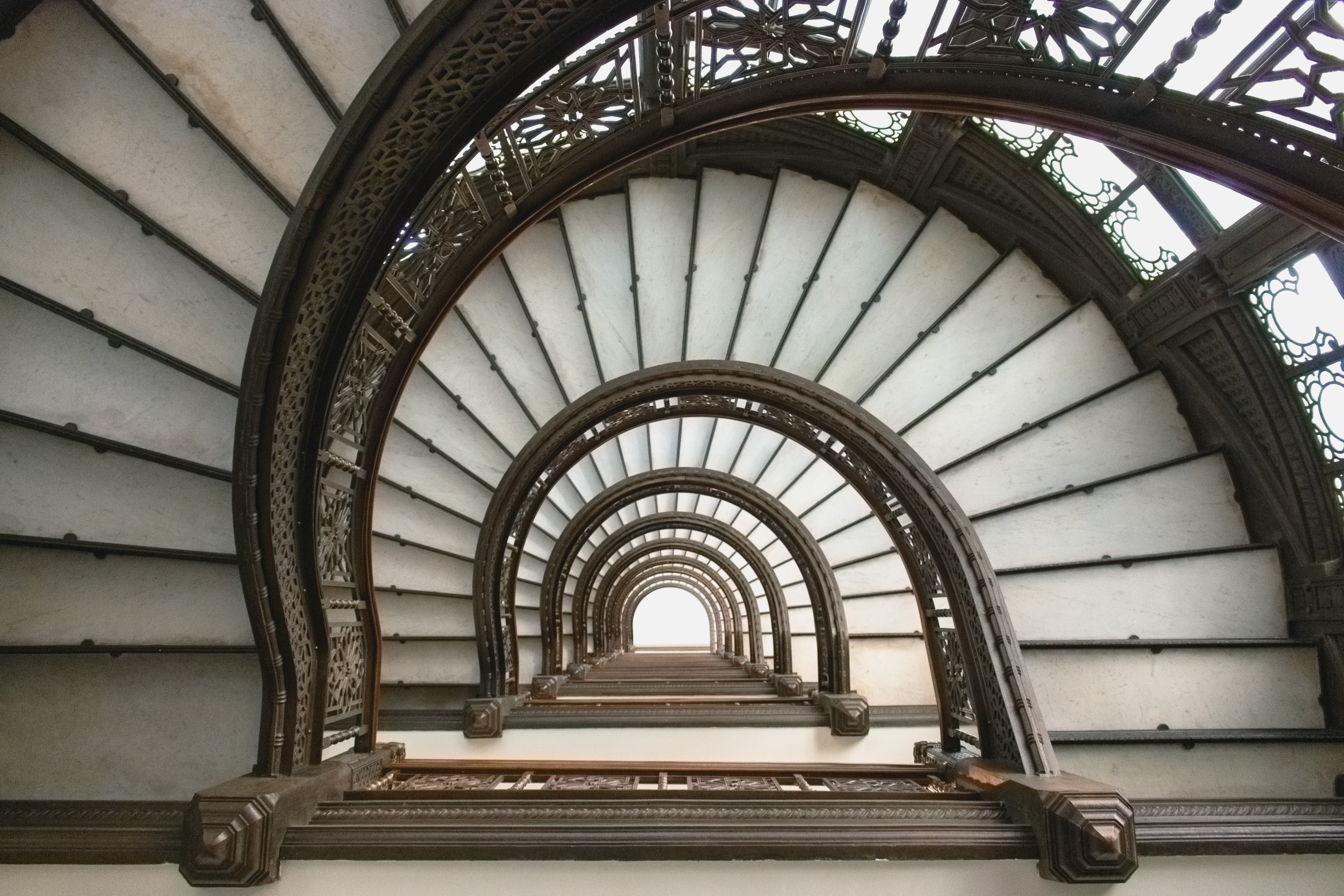
Looking up at the oriel staircase, designed by John Wellborn Root

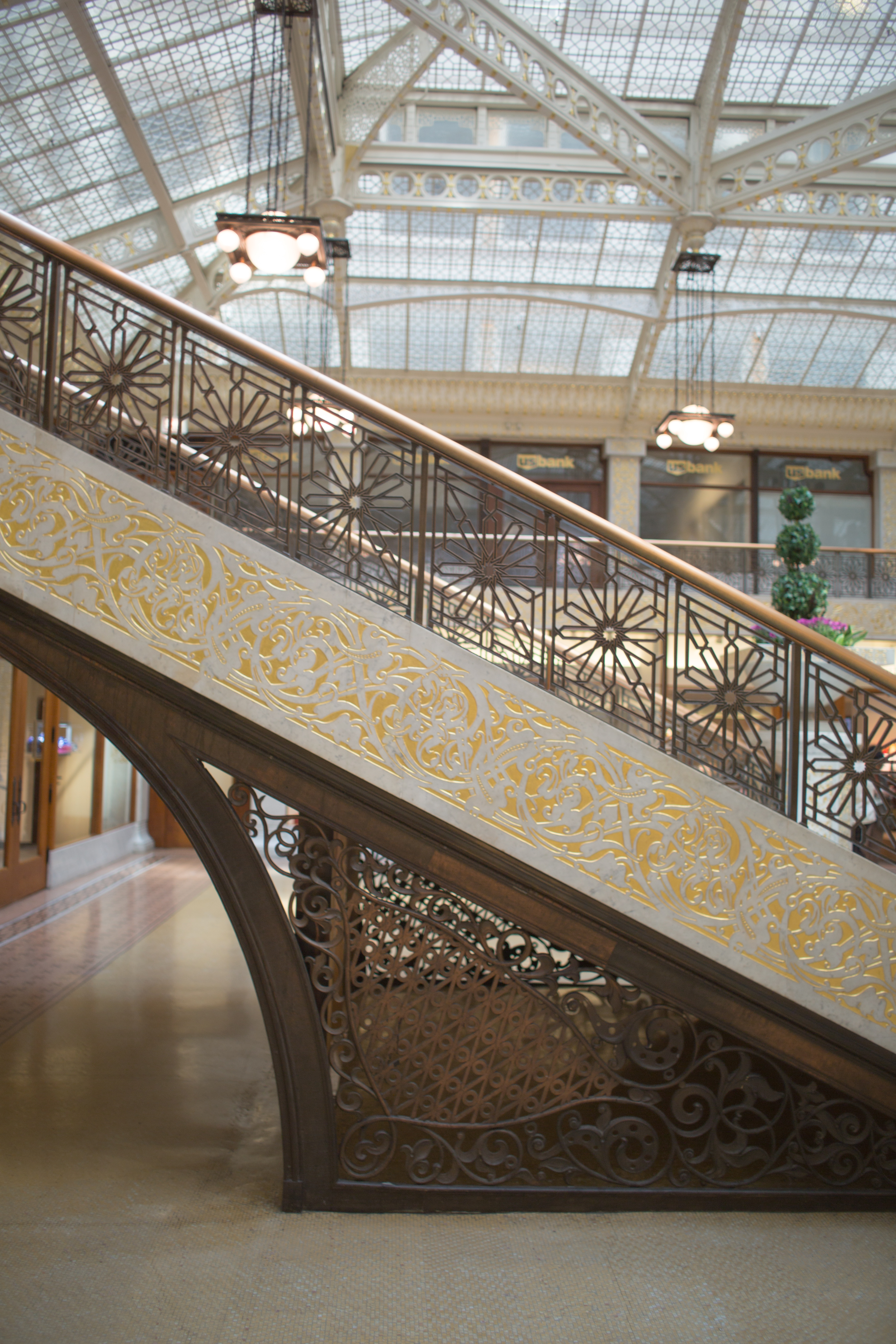
A staircase in the light court

The structure uses a "floating" foundation—a reinforced concrete slab that provided the building's weight with a solid platform atop Chicago's notoriously swampy soil. Root designed a grillage foundation, in which iron rails and the structural beams are combined in a crisscross pattern and encased in concrete to support the building's immense weight without heavy foundation stones. This construction is particularly useful when structural loads are high compared to the natural bearing capacity of the soil.

The building uses a combination of cast and wrought iron framing and masonry bearing walls. This marked a transitional moment in a switch from masonry to steel skeleton structures, and, according to the architectural critic Paul Goldberger, was a precursor to the steel frames of early skyscrapers. The Landmarks Commission citation commends "development of the skeleton structural frame using cast iron columns, wrought iron spandrel beams, and steel beams to support party walls and interior floors". Metal-framed perimeter walls are used only on two sides of the building, and only on two floors; the rest of the walls are made of masonry. This was because the developers had been concerned that the metal frames were not sturdy enough to hold up the building's weight.

=== Interior ===
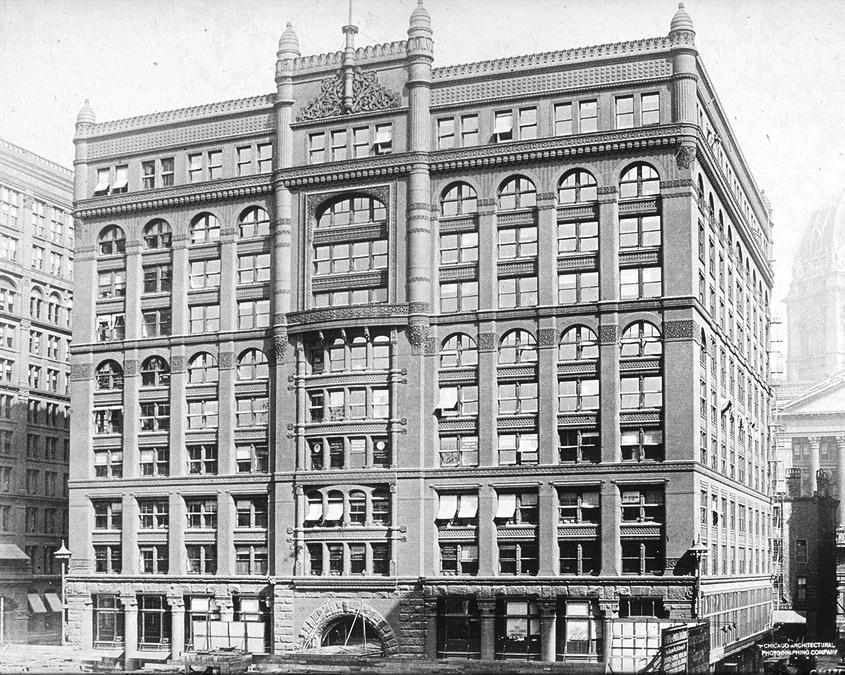
The Rookery Building in 1891

Root and Burnham designed a two-story central light court to serve as the focal point for the entire building and provide daylight to interior offices. The light court, clad in white terracotta, provides natural illumination for the interior offices. The skylight atop the light court is composed of 5,000 glass panes. The lower stories also had a retail arcade, described in one source as the first indoor arcade in the U.S..

The lobby originally had a mosaic-tile floor. The lobby, redesigned by Frank Lloyd Wright in 1905, recast the entryway in his Prairie style, with a simple, modern-style lighting design. Wright's Rookery atrium is his only work on any building in the Chicago Loop, as most of his work in the Chicago metropolitan area was in outlying neighborhoods or the suburbs. Among Wright's most significant alterations was the addition of white marble with Persian-style ornamentation, along with brownish steel and golden tracery. These details added a sense of luxury to the lobby's steel-laden interior, marked by Burnham and Root's skeletal metal ribbing. A curving, heavily ornamented double staircase winds upward from the lobby's second floor, with ornamental urns at the bottom of the staircase. A balcony wraps around the lobby on the second floor.

Each of the upper floors covers 24,500 square feet (2,280 m^{2}) and surrounds an open-air lightwell above the light court. On the 11th floor is a library that originally belonged to Burnham and Root, who had been one of the building's tenants. When completed, the building was served by a hydraulic elevator. The building also has a semi-circular staircase west of the light court.

== History ==
The city government obtained the site in 1852, at which point there was a reservoir there. The name is variously cited as a reference to the pigeons that nested on the reservoir, or the temporary city hall building that occupied the land afterward. After the Great Chicago Fire, an interim structure was built to serve as the city hall, being constructed around a large water tank that had survived the fire. That building was nicknamed the "rookery", in reference to the crows and pigeons that flocked to its exterior, as well as the alleged corrupt politicians it housed. Several other names were considered when the new structure on the site was proposed, but The Rookery won out, and birds, perhaps rook birds, appear in some of its decorative stonework. This water tank once housed part of the Chicago Public Library's collection.

=== Development and early years ===
Edward C. Waller agreed to lease the site in 1885 for 99 years, paying $35,000 a year. He hired the architectural partnership of Daniel H. Burnham and John Wellborn Root, and Root hired a European artist, William Henry Burke, to create a mosaic tile floor for the Rookery. The original owner was Peter Brooks, an investor based in Boston. In the years preceding the Rookery's construction, Brooks had developed numerous buildings in the Loop dating back to 1879. Many of Brooks's developments were significantly taller than the other structures in the area, which were generally at most five stories high. Brooks initially considered giving the building a Native American name before he decided on the "Rookery".

The structure was completed in 1888. Frank Lloyd Wright, a young architectural assistant working with Adler and Sullivan at the time of the Rookery's completion, later had his offices in the building. Daniel Burnham was a friend of Wright patron Edward C. Waller, who managed the Rookery. Burnham & Root had their offices at the Rookery for a while upon its completion, as did the Northern Trust Company. Another major tenant was the Illinois Trust & Savings Bank, which occupied the first floor; the bank and its successors, including the Continental Illinois National Bank and Trust Company, occupied the building for a century. Architect Hermann V. von Holst, advertising agency J. Walter Thompson, and lawyer Clarence Darrow were also listed as early tenants, as were the law office of Carter Harrison III and his son Carter Harrison IV; businessman Samuel Insull; and industrialist John Warne Gates. A 1908 tenant directory listed six real-estate firms, in addition to such companies as travel agencies, pig iron manufacturers and cattle loan agencies.

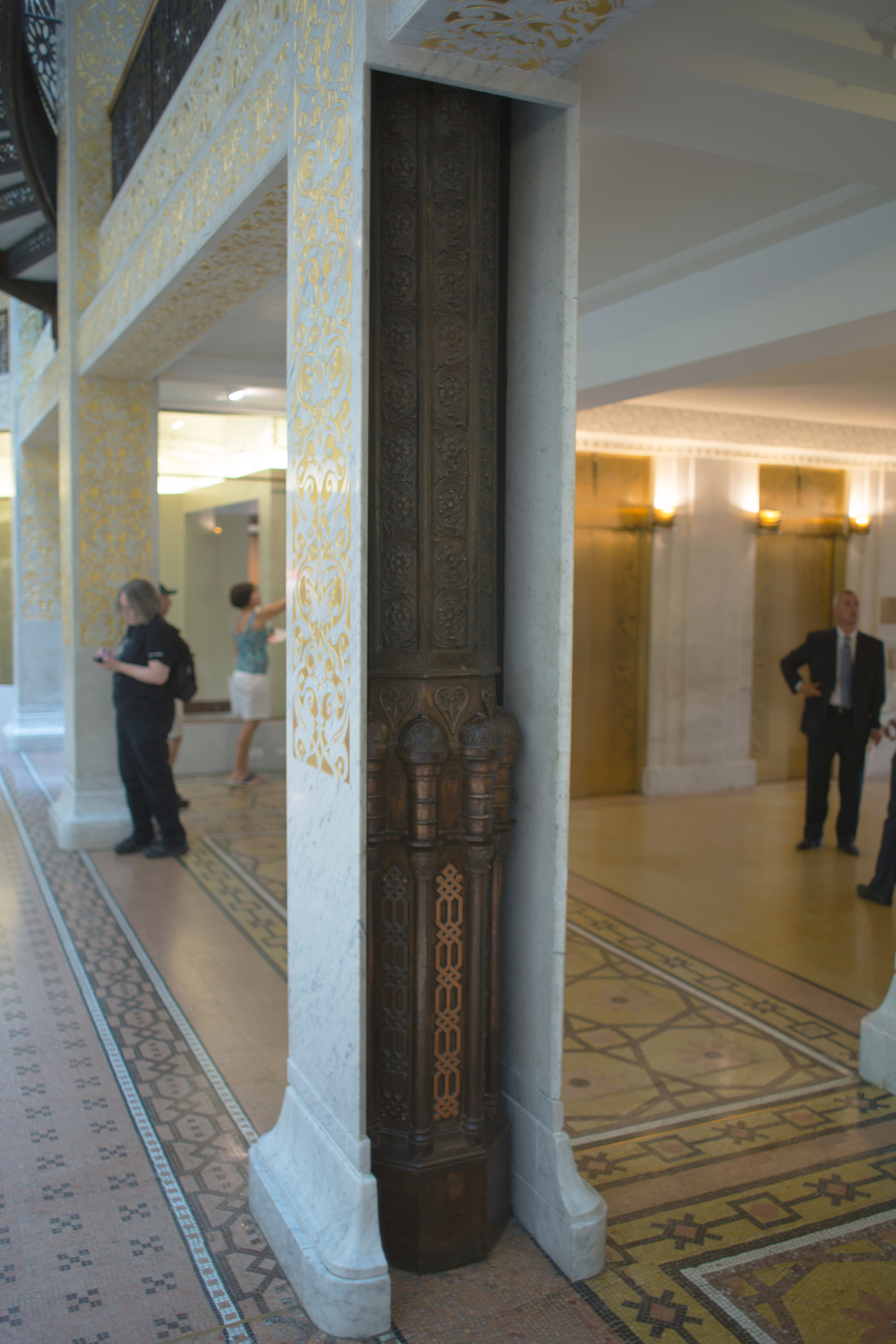
Contrasted with the original wrought iron surfaces (seen here), Wright's renovations significantly brightened the lobby's appearance.

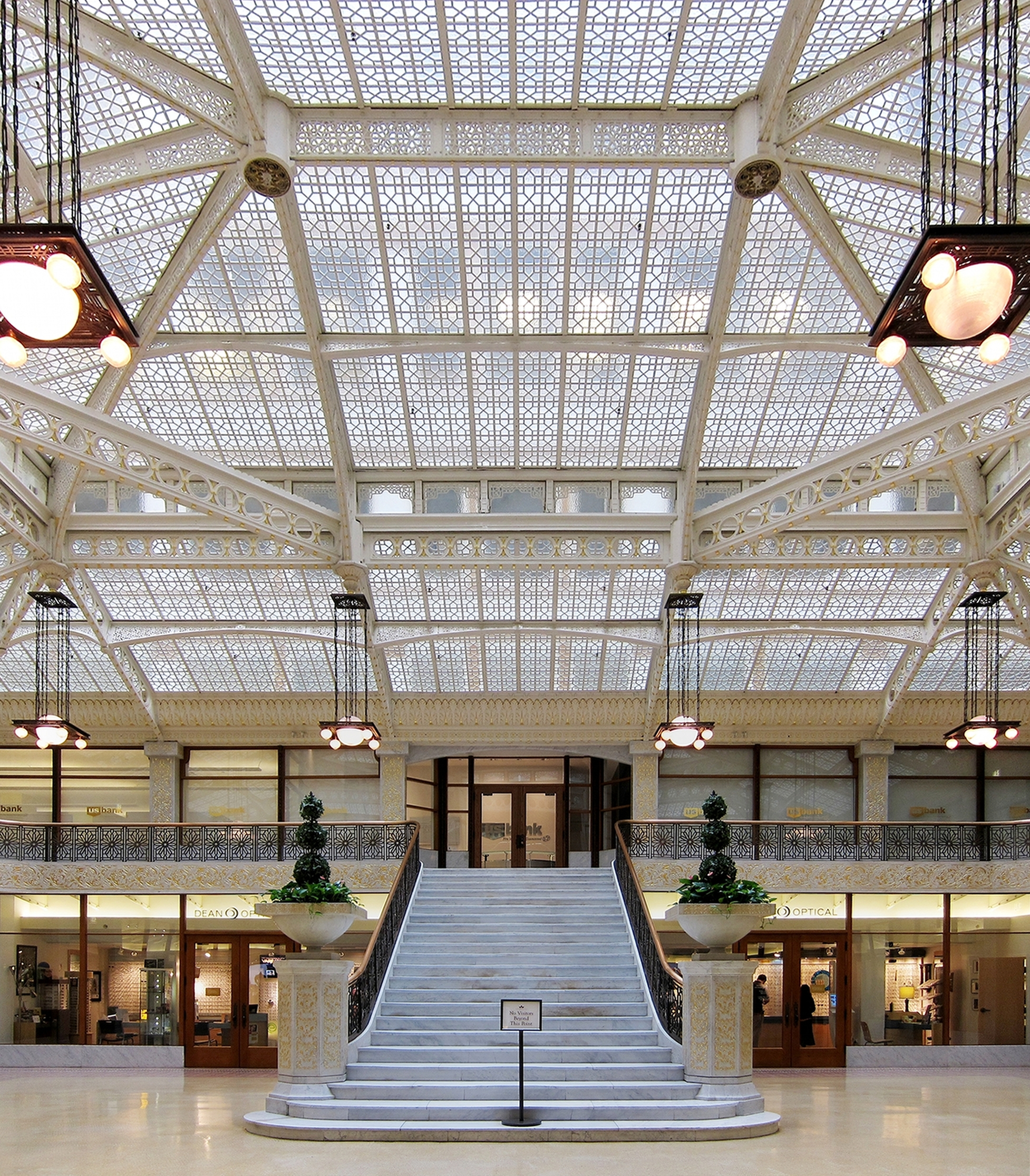
The Rookery's light court, redesigned by Frank Lloyd Wright in 1905, serves as a focal point for the building.

=== Early 20th century ===
From 1905 to 1907, Frank Lloyd Wright was hired to remake the interior spaces, particularly the lobby and mezzanine. In keeping with contemporary tastes, Wright's design covered Root's elaborate wrought iron finishes with white carved Carrara marble surfaces. Wright was highly regarded by the public at this point, and his changes brought enhanced status to the building, making the Rookery one of the most sought after buildings of Chicago. Some of Wright's other changes included incorporating simplified ironwork and adding his trademark style planters and light fixtures.

The second renovation was completed in 1931 by former Wright assistant William Drummond. It modernized many of the interior elements, including new elevators, and brought period touches to the building, such as Art Deco detailing. Drummond's design included the addition of a protruding staircase connecting the lobby floor and balcony. Over the years, some of the glass roof tiles were dislodged. In addition, the light court's roof was covered with tarpaper in the 1940s. In the 1970s, the building's consulting architect added plants to enliven the interior spaces.

=== 1980s and 1990s renovations ===
In 1981, the Chicago Plan Commission approved a plan to sell the building at auction. While the Chicago Department of Water and Sewers owned the underlying land, the building itself was owned by a blind trust benefiting the University of Chicago. At the time, the building's largest tenant was Continental Illinois, which occupied 25 percent of the space. The city government began soliciting bids for the building in 1982, mandating that any potential buyer preserve the exterior and part of the interior; since the building was a city and national landmark, a potential buyer would be able to claim a preservation tax credit. The city re-launched the bidding process after determining that none of the bids were high enough. That October, the city sold the building for $15.1 million to Continental Illinois, which planned to spend up to $19 million on renovations and use the building as office space, leasing out the space it did not occupy. Continental Illinois began cleaning the facade in 1983; this process involved using gasoline and hot water to remove 5 short tons (4.5 long tons; 4.5 t) of grime. In addition, the windows were replaced or fixed, and a skylight was built above the 11th story. When the cleaning was finished in 1984, the overall renovation was scheduled to cost $26.6 million.

The second part of the renovation was to be deferred until May 1985, when the 99-year ground lease expired and Continental Illinois took over the site. Continental Illinois evicted all other tenants in preparation for the renovation. However, the bank subsequently eliminated its retail banking division and left the building vacant. Due to the bank's financial issues, the renovation was halted, and the Rookery Building was placed for sale by 1987. In early 1989, Continental Illinois sold the building for $28 million to Baldwin Development, a firm led by the traders Thomas Baldwin and William Taki. Baldwin later recalled that he had ignored another developer's advice against buying the Rookery. The new owners announced plans to restore the building, converting 41,000 square feet (3,800 m^{2}) on the two lower stories to a shopping mall, while using 267,000 square feet (24,800 m^{2}) on the top ten stories as office space. In addition, the spiral staircases and exterior decorations would be restored, and new mechanical systems would be installed.

Work began in April 1989, at which point the project was planned to cost more than $21 million. The building's landmark status allowed Baldwin to qualify for a federal tax credit of up to 20% of the project's cost. Baldwin hired Broadacre Development Company to oversee the renovation. McClier Corp. was hired as the restoration architect, with Takayama & Associates and Hasbrouck Peterson Associates as consultants; Gunny Harboe of McClier was the primary restoration architect. Baldwin struggled to find an American bank to finance the renovation, negotiating with representatives of more than 100 banks. The Dutch firm NMB Vastgoed Fonds eventually agreed to finance the renovation in 1990. The renovation restored many of the original decorations and reopened the light court's ceiling. A replica of the original mosaic-tile lobby was added for $1 million, and new elevators and a 12th floor were added. Though the project involved restoring much of the building's 1888 appearance, elements of Wright's 1900s renovation and Drummond's 1930s renovation were also preserved. After the project was formally completed in May 1992, McClier won a preservation award from the American Institute of Architects.

=== Mid-1990s to present ===
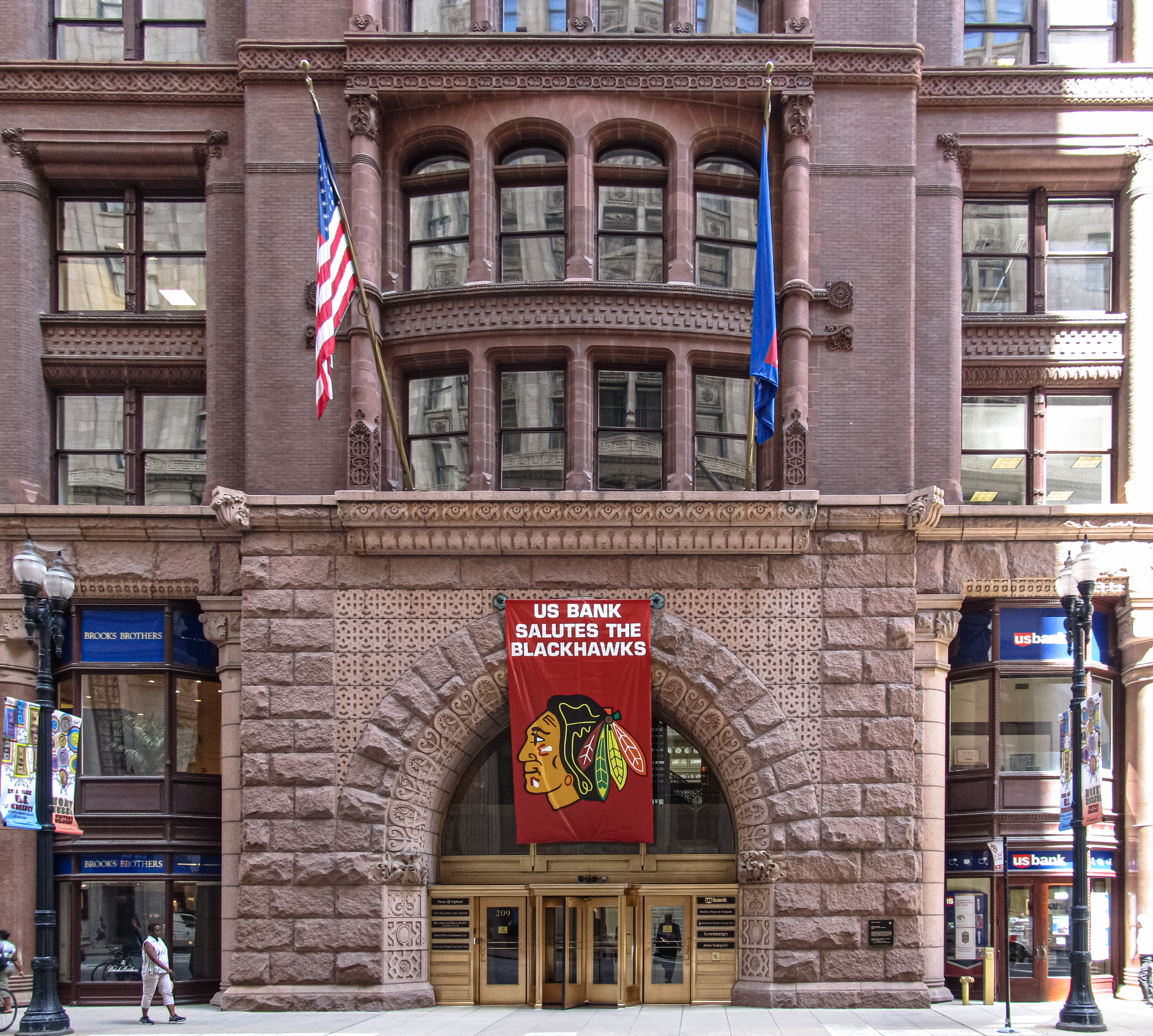
A banner draped over the entrance references US Bank, a tenant, and the Blackhawks, Chicago's NHL team.

Due to a surplus of vacant office space in the Chicago Loop, there was initially uncertainty over whether the Rookery's offices could be leased out, but 46 percent of the space had already been leased when the renovation was finished. However, one real-estate broker received bids totaling 1.5 million square feet (140,000 m^{2}), more than five times the amount of space available in the building. By 1993, the building was 80 percent occupied, with 20,000 monthly visitors. The building's office space was being rented for about $30 per square foot ($320/m^{2}) in the mid-1990s, higher than most buildings in the area. The lenders of the building's $77 million mortgage loan foreclosed on the loan in 1998, and ING Bank took over the building the same year. One of ING's subsidiaries, ING Clarion Partners, took over management.

Although the building had hosted periodic tours, Clarion closed the atrium to the public following the September 11 attacks, citing security concerns. UBS Brinson, a subsidiary of UBS, occupied about 140,000 square feet (13,000 m^{2}) at the Rookery Building at the time; after UBS moved out in 2002, its six floors were vacant for more than two years. US Bank moved its regional headquarters there in 2003. The building also underwent facade restoration in the mid-2000s, during which a piece of masonry fell off the facade. ING placed the Rookery for sale in 2005, at which point it was 80% occupied. Broadway Real Estate Partners of New York bought the Rookery Building for $56 million from ING Clarion Partners in April 2006, paying $29 million in cash and obtaining a $27 million loan. At the time, the building was 65% occupied. BREP had increased occupancy to 80% by January 2007, and it placed the building for sale that March.

The Rookery Building was sold in October 2007 for $73.4 million to Rookery GP LLC, an investment group controlled by a German family. By then, the building was nearly fully occupied, with tenants such as the United States Department of Justice, the National Labor Relations Board, Brooks Brothers, Interactive Brokers, and US Bank. The new owners announced plans for an extensive renovation of the building's common areas. In 2011, Office for Visual Interaction completed the lighting design for the facade, illuminating the architectural features of the building with LED technology. The Rookery Building achieved LEED Gold certification in 2014. The next year, the restrooms were upgraded and a bike storage room was added. Additionally, the elevators were updated with a destination dispatch system in 2017, and the owners upgraded the HVAC system and added public Wi-Fi.

== Visitation ==
The Frank Lloyd Wright Trust, which has maintained an office off the building's atrium since 2010, provides tours of the interior on weekdays. Inside Chicago Walking Tours offers daily walking tours that explore the interior of the Rookery in addition to other historic Chicago buildings. The Chicago Architecture Foundation also provides tours twice a month. By the late 2010s, the building had 100 to 200 daily visitors on average and was frequently used for special events such as weddings.

== Impact ==
=== Reception ===
When the building was completed, its lighting, elevators, fire-resistant materials, and other architectural features garnered praise. Suzanne Avery of the Chicago Tribune said in 1965 that a news headline from 1888, referring to the Rookery as "A Great Office Building", was still relevant and that "at every turn, the building reveals a new and interesting aspect of itself". In 1977, Paul Goldberger of The New York Times wrote that the Rookery was "one of Chicago's most warmly welcoming masonry structures", in part due to its light court and lobby. Goldberger cited the architectural guide Chicago's Famous Buildings as saying that "it stands there like a strong-hearted and cheerful person".

After the 1990s renovation, The New York Times called the Rookery "one of Chicago's most venerable buildings and a model of " the Romanesque style. Kamin praised the 1990s renovation, saying it preserved the original design and subsequent modifications without "slavishly seeking to turn back the clock to a single date", while other observers praised the juxtaposition of the light court and the stone facade. A curator for the Chicago Architecture Foundation told USA Today in 1993 that the building "one of the most exuberant examples of late 19th-century commercial architecture". One observer called it "vigorous yet airy" in 1999, and another critic for the Chicago Tribune called the Rookery a "box of gaudy fun" the same year. In a 1995 poll of Chicago Tribune readers, the Rookery Building won first place in the category "My Favorite Historic Property". A writer for Gentlemen's Quarterly said in 2006 that the building "is a great time warp into late-nineteenth-century Chicago".

==== Interior commentary ====
The light court and lobby also received critical acclaim. "There is nothing bolder, more original, or more inspiring in modern civic architecture than its glass-covered court," wrote the critic Henry Van Brunt. The New York Times referred to the lobby as "the Alhambra in its American incarnation as commercial real estate", while a Financial Times reporter said the lobby was a result of "capitalism and architecture unit[ing] to yield great corporate statements". The Times of Hammond, Indiana, wrote in 1987 that the structure was a "no-frills building" whose main architectural feature was the interior court, while architectural critic Blair Kamin praised the "architectural symphony of lacy ironwork, swooping and coiling staircases, and gilded marble columns that intensify the play of natural light". The lobby's design inspired that of another lobby designed by Burnham at 224 South Michigan Avenue, also in Chicago.

=== Media and landmark designations ===
The Commission on Chicago Architectural Landmarks, the precursor to the modern Commission on Chicago Landmarks, designated the Rookery Building as a landmark in 1958. The first commission described the Rookery as having been notable for its steel frame and for the offices and stores around its atrium. The Rookery was one of the commission's first five landmarks, along with the Auditorium, Carson Pirie Scott, and Monadnock buildings and Robie House. After the modern Commission on Chicago Landmarks hosted a hearing on designating the building as a Chicago Landmark in April 1972, the landmark status was granted on July 5, 1972. It was the first office building in the Loop to receive that designation and was one of the last surviving buildings that had been part of La Salle Street's former financial district. It was added to the National Register of Historic Places (NRHP) on April 17, 1970, and re-added to the NRHP as a National Historic Landmark on May 15, 1975. In 2017, the Rookery and several other early skyscrapers in Chicago were identified as possible future nominees to UNESCO's World Heritage List under the name "Early Chicago Skyscrapers".

The Rookery Building has been featured in multiple media works. It was featured in the film Home Alone 2: Lost in New York, in which the exterior and one of the lower levels were modeled as the toy store Duncan's Toy Chest. The Rookery was used by Frank Norris in his novel The Pit as the site of the office of fictional financial speculator Curtis Jadwin, and it was featured prominently in the 1987 film The Untouchables as the police headquarters of Eliot Ness. In addition, the interior was depicted in a scene of the 2011 film Transformers: Dark of the Moon, standing in for an office at the Tribune Tower.

== See also ==
- List of Chicago Landmarks
- List of Frank Lloyd Wright works
- List of National Historic Landmarks in Illinois
- National Register of Historic Places listings in Central Chicago
- Inside Chicago Walking Tours' interior architecture tours of Chicago
- Early skyscrapers – Tall commercial buildings built between 1884 and 1945
- J.H.C. Petersen's Sons' Store – A small-scale version of the building located in Davenport, Iowa
