= David DiLaura =

American engineer

David L. Dilaura

David L. DiLaura (Boulder, Colorado) is an American engineer, educator and pioneer in lighting calculation software.

DiLaura is a Fellow and Gold Medalist of the Illuminating Engineering Society, a Fellow of the American Association for the Advancement of Science, a member of Tau Beta Pi, and has his LC. He has been topic editor of the 8th and 9th editions of the IES Lighting Handbook and editor of the 10th edition, he has published 42 technical papers, a translation and analysis of Johann Lambert's seminal Latin work "Photometria", authored "A History of Light and Lighting", and for eight years was Editor-in-Chief of LEUKOS, the journal of the Illuminating Engineering Society.

He was inducted into the Architectural Lighting Hall of Fame in 2001, and was awarded an honorary doctorate from the University of Colorado in 2008.

== Works ==
1. DiLaura, David L. (2001). Photometry, or On the Measure and Gradations of Light, Colors, and Shade. A translation of J.H. Lambert's Photometria. New York: Illuminating Engineering Society of North America. ISBN 0-87995-179-6. Archived from the original on May 10, 2012.
2. DiLaura, David L. (2006). A History of Light and Lighting: In Celebration of the Centenary. New York: Illuminating Engineering Society of North America. ISBN 978-0-87995-209-9. Archived from the original on October 9, 2011.
3. DiLaura, David L.; Houser, Kevin W.; Mistrick, Richard G.; Steffy, Gary R., eds. (2011). IES Lighting Handbook (10th ed.). New York: Illuminating Engineering Society of North America.
4. DiLaura, David L. (2021). Bibliotheca Opticoria 1475-1925: A Library of the History of Our Understanding of Light and Vision. Boulder: DLDL Consulting. ISBN 978-0-578-54655-1.
