= 520 West 28th Street =

Building in Manhattan, New York

Coordinates: 40.7512°N 74.0027°W

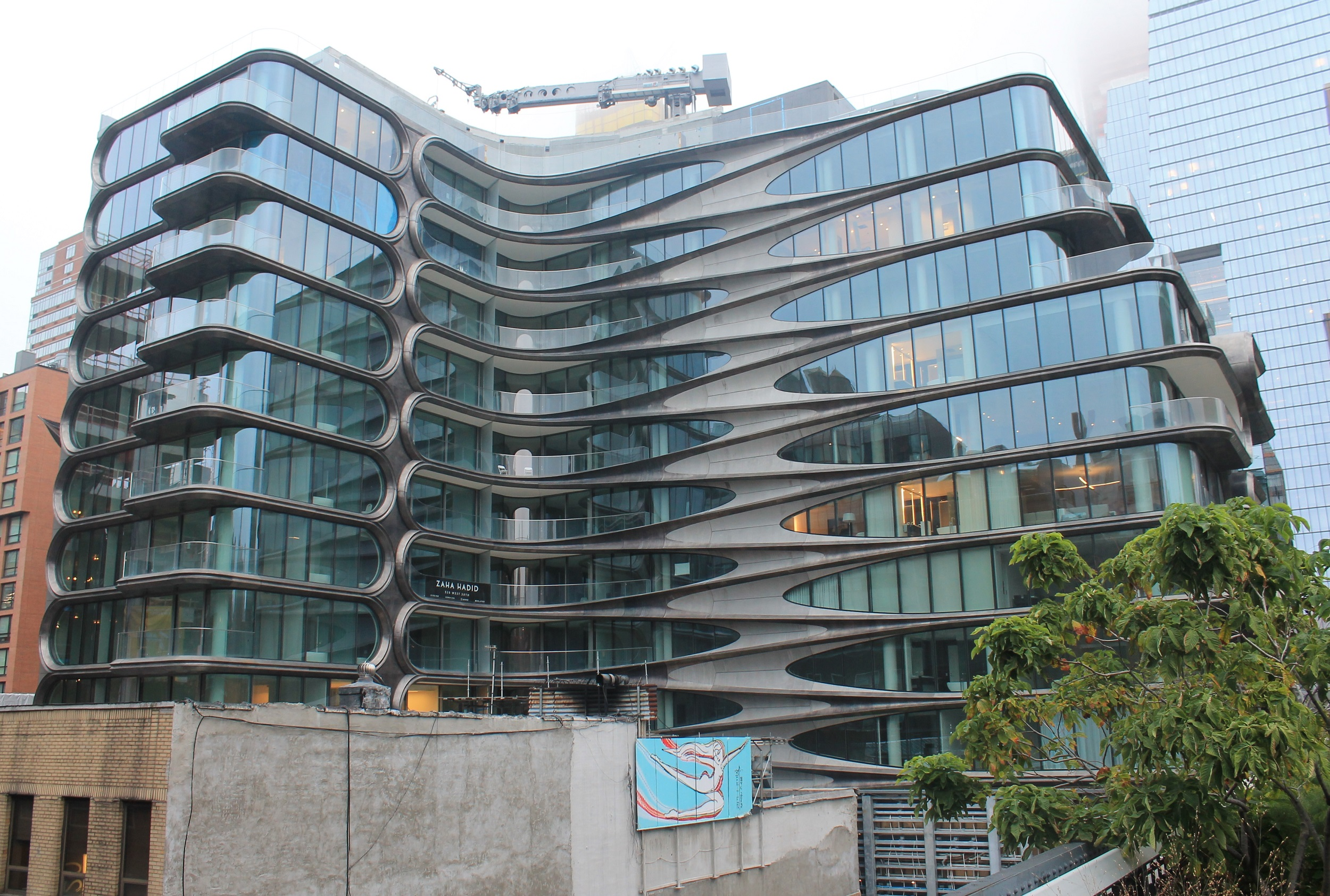
- Seen from the High Line.
- Alternative names: The Zaha Hadid Building

General information
- Status: Completed
- Location: 520 West 28th Street, Manhattan, New York, NY 10001, United States
- Construction started: 2014
- Completed: June, 2017

Height
- Height: 135 feet (41 m)

Technical details
- Floor count: 11
- Lifts/elevators: 4

Design and construction
- Architect: Zaha Hadid
- Developer: The Related Companies

520 West 28th Street, also known as the Zaha Hadid Building, is located in New York City. Designed by the architect Zaha Hadid, the building was her only residential building in New York and one of her last projects before her death. The building is located along the High Line and has four art galleries located at street level. The building also has a sculpture platform with art curated by Friends of the High Line.

== Exterior ==
The building features laser-cut stainless-steel trim that was fabricated and finished in Broomall, PA by M Cohen And Sons. Some of the apartments feature balconies. The building features curvilinear geometric motifs, a signature of Zaha Hadid Architects.

The building is L-shaped and has a duplex penthouse that is recessed from the rest of the building. It is 11 stories tall, but these are divided into 21 split levels.

== Interior ==
In the main entrance of the building, there is an interior massive carved natural stone installation, which was supplied by Greco Marble SA, the supplier of all Greek natural stone of the building (including the main entrance floor, as well as private areas). The building features model units were designed by Jennifer Post and West Chin. The units feature kitchens made by Boffi, which were designed by Zaha Hadid and Gaggenau Hausgeräte appliances. The bathrooms are fitted with smart glass. Lighting design for the interiors, including the lobby, amenities areas and select portions of the individual units, was done by Office for Visual Interaction.

== Building amenities ==
- Doorman
- Pool
- Sculpture garden
- 29-car automated garage
- Private 3D IMAX screening room
- Air filtration system
