= Ray Grenald =

American architect (1928–2024)

Raymond Grenald
- Born: Raymond Greenwald; February 10, 1928; Louisville, Kentucky, U.S.
- Died: March 6, 2024 (aged 96)
- Occupation: Architectural lighting designer
- Years active: 1950s–2000s
- Known for: Founding Grenald-Waldron Associates; Founding member of IALD
- Notable work: Carlsbad Caverns lighting Pennsylvania Avenue lighting Boathouse Row; Liberty Bell Pavilion; Locust Walk, University of Pennsylvania; Pennsylvania Academy of Fine Arts; Oval Office lighting
- Awards: IALD Lifetime Achievement Award (2008); Fellow, American Institute of Architects; Fellow, International Association of Lighting Designers; Fellow, Illuminating Engineering Society

Raymond Grenald (February 10, 1928 – March 6, 2024) was an American architectural lighting designer during the second half of the 20th and early 21st centuries.

Grenald founded his own lighting design firm, Grenald Associates, in Philadelphia in 1968. In 1994, it became Grenald-Waldron Associates.

== Life ==
Raymond Grenald was born on February 10, 1928, in Louisville, Kentucky, as Raymond Greenwald. He attended DuPont Manual High School, graduating in two-and-a-half years rather than the usual four. He then attended the University of Cincinnati until he enlisted in the Army Air Corps in 1946. At the conclusion of his army service, he attended Washington State University on the GI Bill, majoring in aeronautical engineering. He worked for Boeing in that capacity, and also served in the Army during the Korean War era. He then returned to school to get a degree in Architecture at the University of Washington. Grenald died from congestive heart failure on March 6, 2024, at the age of 96.

== Career ==
Following graduation, he moved to Philadelphia, Pennsylvania, and became a practicing architect for the next 14 years. In that capacity, he won international recognition for his lighting designs, and in 1968 opened his own firm specializing in architectural lighting design. The move would make him one of the founding members of a new profession. He also became one of the founders of the International Association of Lighting Designers (IALD) in 1969. During his career he has served as president of the IALD and was on the board of directors for the National Lighting Research Organization.

Grenald was elected to the College of Fellows of the American Institute of Architects in 1985, was a founder and past president of the IALD, and has chaired the IES's national committee on museum and art lighting. Long active in professional education, Grenald has served as a faculty member or visiting lecturer at more than a dozen major universities, including the University of Pennsylvania, Harvard University, Yale University, the University of Southern California, and the Moore College of Art, and has been a board member of the Lighting Research Institute.

== Awards ==
- IALD 2008 Lifetime Achievement Award
- Fellow, American Institute of Architects
- Fellow, International Association of Lighting Designers
- Fellow, Illuminating Engineering Society

== Projects of note ==
Carlsbad Caverns, New Mexico
Grenald redesigned the entire system, using lamp color and distribution characteristics to render the cave's scale and depth. Lighting intensity was gradually reduced so visitors could adapt to the Cavern's lower levels, while lamp color brought out the natural contrasts of the stone walls. Lighting was used to alternately reinforce the immense scale of the caverns and highlight the restrictions of space.
Pennsylvania Avenue, Washington, D.C.
Relit the thoroughfare stretching from the Capitol to the White House as part of a project from 1976 to 1996, sponsored by The Pennsylvania Avenue Development Corporation. The lighting worked to bring out the significance of the boulevard that could be enjoyed by tourists and become an important destination for tourists and locals alike.
Boathouse Row, Philadelphia
Created evening lighting to bring out the beauty of the Victorian-era boathouses and their reflection on the Schuylkill River. The site, once slated for destruction, is now an important Philadelphia landmark.
Locust Walk, University of Pennsylvania
An important component of the University of Pennsylvania's master plan to illuminate the campus at night and make it a safe and attractive destination for students. It also involves lighting the architecturally important Furness Building.
Liberty Bell Pavilion, Philadelphia
This building has housed the Liberty Bell since 2004, and Grenald headed the team that designed the museum's exterior and interior areas.
Pennsylvania Academy of Fine Arts
An important building designed by Frank Furness, Grenald designed lighting during the building's centennial to bring out the beauty of Furness's original designs and enhance the use of the space as a museum and school.
The White House, Washington, D.C.
Relit the Oval Office and many areas of the West Wing.
