= Kaoru Mende =

Japanese designer (born 1950)

Kaoru Mende (born 1950 in Tokyo, Japan) is an architectural lighting designer from Japan.

Mende has bachelor's and master's degrees from the Tokyo University of Art. He is a visiting professor of lighting design at Musashino Art University and also lectures at Tokyo University of the Arts, among other institutions.

Kaoru Mende is the CEO of Lighting Planners Associates. He is a member of the Illuminating Engineering Society (IES, formerly IESNA) and the International Association of Lighting Designers (IALD).

Mende has been involved in such superb projects as Tokyo International Forum, JR Kyoto Station, Sendai Mediatheque, Roppongi Hills, Nagasaki National Peace Memorial Hall for the Atomic Bomb Victims, Kyoto State Guest House, National Museum of Singapore, Singapore City Center Lighting Master Plan, Alila Villas Uluwatu, Gardens by the Bay, Tokyo Station, Aman Tokyo, and Gifu Media Cosmos.

Mende is also the acting chief of the "Lighting Detectives", a citizens' group that specializes in the study of the culture of lighting.

== Awards ==
=== 2007 ===
- Chino Cultural Complex – Radiance Award for Excellence in Lighting Design, IALD International Lighting Design Awards
- Changi Airport Redesign – Award of Merit, IALD International Lighting Design Awards

=== 2006 ===
- One George Street – IESNA Award of Excellence
- Hiroshima City Naka Incineration Plant – IALD Award of Excellence
- Kyoto State Guest House – IESNA Award of Merit
- Kyoto State Guest House – IALD Award of Merit

=== 2005 ===
- Shiodome Sumitomo Building – IESNA Award of Merit
- W Seoul Walkerhill – IESNA Award of Merit

=== 2004 ===
- Kani Public Arts Center – IESNA Award of Merit
- Shiodome City Center & Block B Common Use Area – IESNA Award of Merit
- Nagasaki National Peace Memorial for the Atomic Bomb Victims – Japan Lighting Award

=== 2003 ===
- Oasis 21 – IESNA Award of Distinction
- Sendai Mediatheque – IALD Honorable Mention

=== 2002 ===
- Iwate Museum of Art – IESNA Award of Merit
- Osaka Maritime Museum – IESNA Award of Merit
- National Museum of Emerging Science & Innovation – IESNA Award of Merit

=== 1997 ===
- Tokyo International Forum – IALD Award of Excellence

=== 1996 ===
- Symbol Promenade Water Front Sub Center – IESNA Award of Merit
- Shinjuku Island Tower – IESNA Award of Merit
- Osaka World Trade Center – IESNA Award of Merit
- Kyoto Concert Hall – IESNA Award of Merit
- CASA – IESNA Award of Merit

=== 1995 ===
- Toyonokuni Library for Resources – IESNA Award of Excellence
- Beppu Park – IESNA Award of Merit
- NTT CRED Motomachi Building – IESNA Award of Merit
- Tokyo Marine Insurance Seminar Center – IESNA Award of Merit
- National Yokohama International Conference Hall – IESNA Award of Merit

=== 1994 ===
- Toyota Amlux Osaka – IESNA Award of Merit
- Izumigo Plaza Hotel, Tateshina – IESNA Award of Merit
- Panasonic Data & Communication Center – IESNA Edwin F. Guth Memorial Special Citation

=== 1985 ===
- Japan Garden Light – IESNA Award of Excellence
