= Illuminating Engineering Society =

American learned society

- Formation: 1906; 120 years ago
- Legal status: Not-for-profit organization
- Purpose: To communicate information on all aspects of good lighting practice
- Headquarters: New York City, New York, United States
- Members: 7,869 (2019)
- Official language: English
- President: Billy Tubb
- Vice President: Wilson Dau
- Treasurer: Ira Rothman
- Executive Director: Colleen Harper
- Website: www.ies.org

The Illuminating Engineering Society (IES), is an industry-backed, not-for-profit, learned society that was founded in New York City on January 10, 1906. It is an American National Standards Institute (ANSI) accredited standards developer (ASD). The IES's stated mission is "to improve the lighted environment by bringing together those with lighting knowledge and by translating that knowledge into actions that benefit the public".

Since 1906, when the IES was legally incorporated, the IES has always been known as the "IES". However, in 1981 the 6th edition IES Lighting Handbook published the phrase, "Illuminating Engineering Society of North America("IESNA"). The "IESNA" moniker persisted until it was removed in 2010 when the 10th Edition of Lighting Handbook was released. The IES is a global organization with sections worldwide and solely related to North America.

The Society is headquartered in New York City. The IES is divided into approximately 100 local sections.

Notably, the London-based Society of Light and Lighting (a part of the Chartered Institution of Building Services Engineers), was originally founded in 1909 as another "Illuminating Engineering Society".

== Publications ==
The IES is credited with over 100 publications on the subject of lighting such as The Lighting Handbook: 10th Edition. Other publications, many of which are ANSI or ASHRAE standards, include recommended practices for a variety of specific lighting applications such as office, sports, and outdoor lighting, and lighting for healthcare facilities. The National Institute of Standards and Technology (NIST) references several IES publications for Optical Radiation Calibrations. The International Dark-Sky Association (IDA) makes several references to the IES and its publications in its Outdoor Lighting Code Handbook.

IES published Transactions of the Illuminating Engineering Society from 1906 to 1939, and replaced it with the monthly Illuminating Engineering in 1940. The latter was succeeded by two IES publications in 1971: Lighting Design & Application (LD&A) magazine and the Journal of the Illuminating Engineering Society. The magazine was renamed LD+A in 1982, and the journal was renamed LEUKOS in 2004.

Notably, the London-based namesake described above published its own Transactions of the Illuminating Engineering Society until 1968.

LEUKOS is published by Taylor & Francis with four issues per year.

LD+A is published by Sage Journals and is free to members.

== Illumination Awards ==
Annually since 1973, the IES Illumination Awards program has recognized individual engineers and lighting designers for meritorious original design in a nominated project. While local sections may offer their own awards, there are five international award categories:

- The Edwin F. Guth Memorial Award for Interior Lighting Design
- The Outdoor Lighting Design Award sponsored by Eaton's Cooper Lighting Business, formerly the Paul Waterbury Award for Outdoor Lighting Design
- The Energy and Environmental Design Award sponsored by Osram Sylvania
- The Lighting Control Innovation Award, sponsored by the NEMA's Lighting Controls Association
- The Aileen Page Cutler Memorial Award for Residential Lighting Design

=== The Edwin F. Guth Memorial Award for Interior Lighting Design ===
The awards are for an outstanding balance of function and aesthetic in interior lighting projects

Year	(gold) Award of Distinction	(silver) Award of Excellence
2022 (49th)	N/A	Available Light and Darkhorse Lightworks for Academy of Motion Pictures Exhibit Lighting Los Angeles; YOD Design Lab for Buddha-Bar New York; Christensen Lighting for Hall of Ancient Egypt, Houston Museum of Natural Science
2021 (48th)	N/A	Glint Lighting Design for Chongqing Changshou Sales Gallery in Chongqing, China; WSP USA for Allegiant Stadium in Las Vegas; WSP USA, Isometrix for The West Hollywood Edition in Las Vegas
2020 (47th)	Speirs Major for Re-lighting of Interior of Norwich Cathedral	ASlight for Euphoria Retreat Spa Resort in Mystras, Greece; ATL Lighting Design Shanghai Company for Confucian Palace in Qufu, China; Charter Sills & Associates for Chicago Union Station Great Hall Restoration
2019 (46th)	Brandston Partnership for Sunac Sales Center, Shanghai, China; Lux Populi for Lakeview Penthouse, Chicago; KOIZUMI Lighting Technology for Kyoto Kaguraoka Ren Getsu-So, Kyoto, Japan; Tillotson Design Associates for Gateway Arch Museum, St. Louis	Expolight for "Smartass" Sports Club, Kyiv, Ukraine; Gallegos Lighting Design for DreamWorks Animation Zone, Dubai, UAE; Lightcraft for Hearst Digital Media, New York City; Eric Johnson Associates for Silver Oak Alexander Valley Winery Interior, Healdsburg, CA USA
2018 (45th)	N/A	Kugler Ning Lighting for McKim, Mead & White – Dining Room Restoration, New York City; SmithGroupJJR; Phoenix Sky Harbor Airport Terminal 3 Renovation, Phoenix; Museum of the Bible, Washington, D.C.; Wutopia Lab for Underground Forest In Onepark Gubei, Shanghai
2017 (44th)	Fisher Marantz Stone for World Trade Center Transportation Hub, New York City	Architecture & Light for EDMUNDS.COM, Santa Monica, CA; The Flaming Beacon Lighting Designers for Park Hyatt Sanya Sunny Bay Resort Public Areas, Hainan, China; LD Studio for Museum of Tomorrow, Rio de Janeiro, Brazil; Raul Osses – Limarí Lighting Design for Bahá’í Temple Of South America, Peñalolén, Santiago, Chile
2016 (43rd)	Lighting Planners Associates for Minna No Mori Gifu Media Cosmos, Gifu, Japan; Tillotson Design Associates for Lincoln Square Synagogue, New York City	N/A
2015 (42nd)	Arup Lighting; Brown University Building for Environmental Research and Teaching Providence; Fulton Center New York City; Applied Engineering Solutions for Guildford recreation Centre Aquatic Addition Surrey, British Columbia; Auerbach Glasow French for California Palace of the Legion of Honor, Salon Doré San Francisco; Birkenstock Lighting Design for SFOT3 BAE San Francisco; Kugler Ning Lighting Design; Restoration of the Nave of Yale Sterling Memorial Library New Haven, CT; McKim, Mead & White Library Restoration New York City; W Lakeshore Hotel Lobby and Restaurant Renovation Chicago; Sean O’Connor Lighting for Volvér by José Garces Philadelphia	Cooley Monato Studio for Barneys Beverly Hills, CA; SmithGroupJJR for Microsoft Mississauga, Ontario
2014 (41st)	Cooley Monato Studio, BBG-BBGM for Waldorf = Astoria Park Avenue Lobby & Entry New York City; Mindseye for St. Moritz Church Augsburg, Germany	AKF Group Lighting Design for Spaulding Rehabilitation Hospital Boston; Cline Bettridge Bernstein Lighting Design, Inc. for Baldwin Auditorium Renovation, Duke University Durham, NC; HLB Lighting Design for Verizon Innovation Center San Francisco; Lighting Design Alliance for Hyde at American Airlines Arena Miami; MCLA Inc. for University of Baltimore Angelos Law Center Baltimore; Minuscule Lighting Design for West Berkeley Public Library Berkeley, CA; Schuler Shook; City Performance Hall Dallas; Saenger Theatre New Orleans; Sladen Feinstein Integrated Lighting Inc. for MIT Barker Engineering Library Reading Room Cambridge, MA
2013 (40th)	PritchardPeck Lighting for Velti San Francisco Headquarters	Creative Designs in Lighting for Cole Capital Phoenix; HGA Architects and Engineers for Lakewood Cemetery Garden Mausoleum Minneapolis; Lighting Planners Associates for Ise Shrine Sengu Museum; Sean O’Conner Lighting; Sweet Crush Los Angeles; Venture Capital Office Building Menlo Park, CA
2012 (39th)	N/A	Light and Design, Illuminart for Qatar National Convention Centre- Concourses Doha, Qatar; Lighting Design Alliance for UCLA Infusion Center Los Angeles; Ron Neal Lighting Design for Immaculata San Diego
2011 (38th)	ICE Illumination of City Environment for Happo-En: Hakuhou-Kan Hall Renovation, Tokyo	Focus Lighting for Science Storms At The Museum Of Science And Industry, Chicago; Kahori Mori-Iris Associates for New Temple In Ekō-in; Renfro Design Group for The Morgan Library & Museum-Mckim Restoration
2010 (37th)	N/A	Speirs Major for Armani Store, 5Th Avenue; Nihon Sekkei, Inc. for Izunome Tokyo; Parsons Brinckerhoff for Mizu Salon, Boston
2009 (36th)	N/A	Speirs Major for Entrance and Atrium, 3 More London Riverside London; Lightbrigade Architectural Lighting for Murale Toronto; Fisher Marantz Stone for Museum of Islamic Art, Doha, Qatar; Licht Kunst Licht for Novartis Campus Reception Building and Underground Carpark Basel Switzerland; Speirs Major for Sheikh Zayed Bin Sultan Al Nahyan Mosque Abu Dhabi, UAE; Lighting Design Alliance for Co-Cathedral of the Sacred Heart Houston
2008 (35th)	Office of Visual Interaction for United States Air Force Memorial	Horton Lees Brogden Lighting Design for Creative Artists Agency Headquarters; Derek Porter Studio for Hodgdon Powder Facility, Herrington, KS; Cline Bettridge Bernstein Lighting Design for the Renee and Henry Segerstrom Concert Hall, Costa Mesa, CA; Lighting Planners Associates for Midland Square, Aichi, Japan

Special Citation

- 2022 Daisuki Light Inc. for Ichijo-Toma Co-op Olympia Tokyo (Philosophical Approach to Residential Lighting Design); Lighting M Inc. for Fukokuseimei Building Lobby Renovation Tokyo (Main Lobby Ceiling with Regard to Tunability and Application of Light to Transform a Space)
- 2020 Cline Bettridge Bernstein Lighting Design; Duda/Paine Architects for Center For Health And Wellbeing, Winter Park in FL, USA (Enhancing a Strong Architectural Form)
- 2019 Schuler Shook, Perfido Weiskopf Wagstaff + Goettel, Martinez & Johnson Architecture/OTJ for Cincinnati Music Hall, Cincinnati (Historical Renovation) and Alvine Engineering for OPS JP LORD, Omaha, NE USA (Strong Correlation Between Lighting Design and Users of the Space)
- 2018 School of Architecture, Tsinghua University, X Studio for Shangping Village Regeneration, Xiyuan Town, Jianning County, Sanming City, Fujian Province, China (Innovative Use of Color and Materials) and Licht Kunst Licht AG for HSBC Cafeteria, Düsseldorf, Germany (Human Centric Illumination in a Daylight Deprived Space)
- 2017 The Lighting Practice, Inc. for Case Western Reserve University, The Milton And Tamar Maltz Performing Arts Center, Cleveland, OH (Meeting the Technical Challenge of Transforming a Historic Building into a Performance Space); Illumination of City Environment for Tokyu Plaza Ginza, Ginza, Chuo-ku, Tokyo; Grand Sight Design International Limited for Intercontinental Beijing Sanlitun, Beijing, China (Attention to Detailing & Sensitivity to the Architecture); KGM Architectural Lighting for Westfield Terminal 2 At Los Angeles International Airport, Los Angeles, CA (Internal Backlighting of Sculptural Elements)
- 2016 NBBJ for 1201 3rd Ave Public Spaces Renovation, Seattle (Execution and Simplicity); Morrissey Engineering for Blue Barn, Omaha, NE (Use of Light as a Beacon that Enhances the Community Culture); Nikken Sekkei for Narita International Airport Second Passenger Terminal Building (Integration of Daylight and Electric Light Within Circulation Spaces to Enhance User Experience); AES for Ubc Student Union Building, Vancouver, British Columbia (Architectural Integration and Coordination)
- 2009 George Sexton Associates for Star-Spangled Banner Exhibit National Museum of American History Washington, D.C. (Uniform Illumination of a Large Artifact from a Single Source)
- 2008 Douglas Welch Design Associates, Ltd. for Museo del Acero – Furnace Show, Monterrey, Mexico (Metaphoric alliteration)

=== The Outdoor Lighting Design Award ===
The awards are for an outstanding built environment solution by aesthetic, creative, and fine technical aspects of outdoor lighting projects with a good understanding of activities.

Year	(gold) Award of Distinction	(silver) Award of Excellence
2022 (49th)	Lam Partners for SoFi Stadium Inglewood, CA	Lux Populi for NorthConnex Sydney, Australia
2021 (48th)	N/A	Kugler Ning Lighting for Fotografiska in New York City
2020 (47th)	Skira for GTC Matrix in Zagreb, Croatia; NAC Engineering for Riverfront Park Pavilion in Spokane, WA USA	Brandston Partnership for Jinzunbao Experience Center in Luzhou, China
2019 (46th)	N/A	Brilliant Lighting Studio for Von Karman Creative Campus, Irvine, CA; CS Design For Sun Life Building, Montréal; Illuminating Concepts for MGM Cotai, Macau; Motoko Ishii Lighting Design Inc. for Eiffel Tower Dressed In Japanese Lights, Paris; Sean O'Connor Lighting for RH New York Façade, New York City; SmithGroup for Wayne State University, Mike Ilitch School Of Business, Detroit
2018 (45th)	N/A	Moment Factory, Réalisations, Ambiances Design Productions, ATOMIC3, Ombrages, Lucion Média and UDO Design for Jacques Cartier Bridge, Montréal; StandardVision, Lighting Design Alliance for Wilshire Grand Center, Los Angeles
2017 (44th)	N/A	Brandston Partnership for Nanjing Youth Olympic Center, Nanjing Jiangsu, China; Salex Inc., Mulvey & Banani for Niagara Falls Illumination Enhancement, Niagara Falls, Ontario
2016 (43rd)	L'Observatoire International for Steel Stacks Campus, Bethlehem, PA	Cooley Monato Studio for NBCUniversal Lobby And Mezzanine Restoration, New York City; Focus Lighting for Mapparium, Boston; ICRAVE LIGHTING for Page at DCA, Arlington, VA; Lonergan Engineering Inc. for IMAX Sheridan Park Redevelopment, Mississauga, Ontario; WSP/MMM Group for Union Pearson Express Union Station Lighting, Toronto, Ontario
2015 (42nd)	Claudia Paz Lighting Studio for Affinity: An Interactive Art Piece Lima, Peru	Kugler Ning Lighting Design for Carnegie Hall Façade Lighting New York City; Shanghai Grandar Light Art & Technology Co., Ltd. for Culture & Art Center Shanghai, China
2014 (41st)	N/A	Tillotson Design Associates for Yonkers Casino Yonkers, NY
2013 (40th)	Sirius Lighting Office Inc. for Tokyo Skytree	Motoko Ishii for Tokyo Gate Bridge; Speirs Major for Twin Sails Bridge Borough of Poole, U.K.
2012 (39th)	Fisher Marantz Stone for The National September 11 Memorial New York	Candela for Ladder Creek Falls Seattle; CMA Lighting Design for Giant Bicycle Headquarters Taichung City, Taiwan; Light Cibles for Lighting Beirut Architecture Beirut, Lebanon; NBBJ Studio 9 for The Bill and Melinda Gates Foundation-Site Seattle
2011 (38th)	N/A	Shanghai Grandar Light Art & Technology Co., Ltd. for Expo Axis, World Expo Shanghai 2010; Tillotson Design Associates for Lincoln Center
2010 (37th)	Speirs Major for Sheikh Zayed Grand Mosque	Candela for Lightcatcher building Whatcom Museum, Seattle
2009 (36th)	N/A	bLd Lighting for 7th Courtyard of Beijing Olympic Green Central District Beijing
2008 (35th)	N/A	Horton Lees Brogden Lighting Design for Pasadena City Hall

Special Citation

- 2022 (49th) Expolight for Park of Culture and Rest Named by M.O. Hurov Mariupol, Ukraine (Transforming a Park); Guangzhou Goden Lighting Design for Lantern Art Space Foshan, Guangdong, China (Ingenuity and Integration); Morrissey Engineering for Suzanne and Walter Scott Aquarium Omaha, NE (Playful Use of Integrated Color)
- 2021 (48th) Expolight for Freedom Square in Mariupol, Ukraine (Use of technology to create a community experience)
- 2020 (47th) Chris Werner Design for Night Garden Miami (Use of Interactive Technology)
- 2019 (46th) Gwen Grossman Lighting Design for Art in The Mart, Chicago (Seamless Artistic Integration Between Projection and Lighting)
- 2018 (45th) Skira for Hendrix Bridge, Zagreb, Croatia (Controls)
- 2017 (44th) Steensen Varming for Australian War Memorial, Campbell Act, Australia (Applying Restraint While Balancing the Emotional Aspects of a War Memorial); COOP HIMMELB(L)AU – Wolf D. Prix & Partner ZT GmbH, agLicht, Grand Sight Design International Limited for Mocape Shenzhen, Shenzhen, China (Artful Illumination of a Unique Glass Envelope Responsive to the Architecture); Shanghai Grandar Light Art & Technology Co., Ltd. for Fuzhou Strait Olympic Sports Center, Fuzhou, Fujian, China (Coordinated Large-Scale Integration of Dynamic Lighting)
- 2016 (43rd) ArtSci Lighting Design Studio for University of California-San Diego Warren College Douglas Hall Pedestrian Bridge Replacement (Lighting Intervention that Improves Safety and Enhances the User's Experience)
- 2010 (37th) Fox + Fox Design LLC for Louis Vuitton @ The Crystals (Exceptional integration of kinetic LED technology)
- 2009 (36th) KBAS DESIGN ERS: Jack Mashel. for Pentagon Memorial
- 2008 (35th) ALD for Umbra, Toronto (Energy-conscious facade lighting)

=== The Lighting Control Innovation Award ===
The awards are for a non-residential project that providing outstanding energy savings, appropriate variety of functions, value creations, and achieving at least a good lighting solution.

Year	(gold) Award of Distinction	(silver) Award of Excellence
2021 (48th)	Moment Factory for Arctic Adventure: Exploring With Technology At The Museum Of Science In Boston, USA	AES Engineering Ltd. for BC Legislative Chambers in Victoria, BC USA
2020 (47th)	N/A	Lighting Planners Associates for Jewel Changi Airport in Singapore; NAC Engineering for Riverfront Park Pavilion in Spokane, WA USA
2019 (46th)	cBright Lighting for Love Sculpture At Sakura Lake Sport Park, Weihai, China	N/A
2018	N/A	N/A
2017	N/A	N/A
2016 (43rd)	N/A	Creative Lighting Design and Engineering, LLC for Blues Control, Atmore, AL; Schuler Shook, Ross Barney Architects, Sasaki Architects for Chicago Riverwalk; Tillotson Design Associates for Broad Museum, Los Angeles; TORYO International Lighting Design Center, Beijing Oriental Fuhai Lighting Engineering Design Co., Ltd. for Harbin Grand Theatre Lighting, Harbin, Heilongjiang Province, China
2015	N/A	N/A
2014	N/A	N/A
2013 (40th)	N/A	Focus Lighting for “Reflect” at the Stephen P. Clark Government Center Lobby Miami; StudioK1 for Anaheim Convention Center Grand Plaza Anaheim, CA
2012 (39th)	N/A	Light and Design, Illuminart for Qatar National Convention Centre- Concourses Doha, Qatar
2011	N/A	N/A

Special Citation

- 2015 (42nd) Karpinski Engineering for Cleveland Clinic, Fairview Hospital Intensive Care Unit, Cleveland (Innovative Lighting Controls Employed Within a Corridor)

=== The Energy and Environmental Design Award ===
The awards are for a newly energy-saving strategy in commercial and industrial projects that also achieve quality lighting solutions.

Year	(gold) Award of Distinction	(silver) Award of Excellence
2021	N/A	N/A
2020 (47th)	N/A	Minuscule Lighting Design for San Francisco International Airport Parking Garage
2019 (46th)	N/A	Skira for Evolution Tower, Moscow
2018 (45th)	N/A	ATCO for Intelligent Streetlight, Lloydminster, Alberta, Canada (motion-sensor, dimming off-peak hours); Benya Burnett Consultancy for ASID Headquarters, Washington, D.C. (LEED and WELL, daylight and automation lighting and curtain); Randy Burkett Lighting Design for Capital Cascades Connector Bridge, Tallahassee, FL
2017	N/A	N/A
2016	N/A	N/A
2015	N/A	N/A
2014 (41st)	N/A	Lang Lighting Design for Bank of America Building Façade Dallas; Reyes Engineering for Cherriots Salem, OR
2013 (40th)	N/A	The Lighting Practice for the David L. Lawrence Convention Center Water Feature, Pittsburgh
2012	N/A	N/A
2011 (38th)	N/A	Campbell, Atelier Ten for Cushing Center, Yale School of Medicine; HGA Architects and Engineers for University of Minnesota, Science Teaching And Student Services Center
2010 (37th)	N/A	Total Lighting Solutions for Canada Line, Vancouver; Lumia Light Studio for Hanna Gabriel Wells Bacon Street Offices, San Diego; Andrew Beldecos Lighting Design for Navy Federal Credit Union Brain L. McDonnell Center, Atlanta
2009 (36th)	N/A	Kaplan Gehring McCarroll Architectural Lighting, Inc. for The Palazzo Resort Hotel and Casino Las Vegas

Special Citation

- 2018 (45th) Nikken Sekkei for Tsu City Industrial Sports Center "Saorina", Tsu-City, Mie Prefecture, Japan (Unique Daylight Delivery System)
- 2016 (43rd) WSP for Noaa Inouye Regional Center, Honolulu (Adaptive Reuse of an Existing Structure Encompassing Integration of Daylight, Skylight and Controlled Artificial Light)
- 2014 (41st) Arup Raad Studio for Imagining the Lowline New York City
- 2010 (37th) CD+M Lighting Design Group for Hard Rock Cafe, Guitar Chandelier (Creative application of LED)

== See also ==
=== Notable members ===
- David DiLaura
- Thomas Edison (Honorary)
- Beatrice Irwin
- Kaoru Mende

=== Related organizations ===
- Alliance to Save Energy (ASE)
- Institution of Lighting Professionals (ILP)
- International Association of Lighting Designers (IALD)
- International Commission on Illumination (CIE)
- Professional Lighting Designers' Association (PLDA)
- Society of Light and Lighting (SLL)
