= Lesley Wheel =

American architectural lighting designer

Lesley Wheel (1929–2004) was an American architectural lighting designer and one of the pioneers of architectural lighting design. Wheel graduated from Bryn Mawr College and was trained in theater lighting and production, working under Jean Rosenthal at the New York City Ballet before moving into architectural lighting design and co-founding the firm Wheel-Garon Inc. She was one of the first women to practice architectural lighting design full-time. Her work focused primarily on hotel and hospitality design, and she was known for her skill in creating warmth and intimacy through light.

Wheel was a founding member and past president of the International Association of Lighting Designers and the first person to receive its Lifetime Achievement Award. She was a founding member and past director of the Nuckolls Fund for Lighting Education and a former director of the Lighting Research Institute. After her death, the Nuckolls Fund established an annual grant in her name for an introductory lighting program at a college or a university.

== Notable projects ==
- Willard Hotel
- Monte Carlo Hotel and Casino
- Union Station

== Notable awards ==
- Designers Lighting Forum Honor Award (1979)
- Reader's Choice award from Architectural Lighting Magazine (1990)
- IALD Lifetime Achievement Award (1999)
