= Speirs Major =

- Type: Private
- Industry: Architecture and design Lighting design Brand and communications
- Founded: 1992
- Founders: Jonathan Speirs and Mark Major
- Headquarters: London, UK
- Key people: Mark Major and Keith Bradshaw
- Number of employees: 38
- Website: www.smlightarchitecture.com

Speirs Major Light Architecture (SMLA) (formerly Speirs + Major, Speirs and Major Associates) is a UK lighting design practice founded by Jonathan Speirs (1958-2012) and Mark Major in 1993. The practice is noted for its illumination of many prominent buildings, including Barajas International Airport, 30 St Mary Axe (‘The Gherkin’), the Millennium Dome and the interior of St. Paul's Cathedral. The firm has also developed lighting master plans for several British cities, including Cambridge, Coventry, Durham, Newcastle, and for major private developments including Greenwich Peninsula and King’s Cross Central, London.

Speirs Major has been credited with helping to raise awareness of the lighting design profession in the UK. Today it employs approximately 38 people drawn from disciplines including architecture, art, lighting, interior, graphic and theatrical design. Its studios are based in London, UK and Tokyo, Japan.

== Light Architecture ==
Both founding members Jonathan Speirs, who died on 18 June 2012, and Mark Major trained and practiced as architects before focusing on lighting design. In interviews they argued that light should be embedded at the heart of the architectural design process rather than applied as a ‘cosmetic add-on’. This integral approach to light led them to adopt the term ‘lighting architect’ to describe their role as ‘building with light as opposed to bricks and mortar’. Keith Bradshaw was appointed as a principal in 2009, and the studio was rebranded as Speirs + Major in August 2010, with the studio at that time terming themselves as 'designers who work with light' to reflect the breadth of skill in their team and to encompass their work that included not only lighting architecture, but strategy and branding projects as well as product and innovation. On 24 November 2020, the studio announced a change in name and brand identity to SPEIRS MAJOR LIGHT ARCHITECTURE to reflect their evolution from an atelier practice to a broader organisation headed by several Partners under the creative directorship of Keith Bradshaw and Mark Major. Moving away from 'designers working with light' they instated use of the term "Light Architecture" to better reflect their design ethos, describing themselves as having a "fascination with light, form, space and time." and a desire to "progressively and responsibly use light to improve the experience of the built environment, promote well-being and generate a unique sense of place.”

== Notable projects ==
- K11 Musea, Hong Kong (2019)
- Interior lighting for Norwich Cathedral, Norwich, UK (2019)
- The Beverly Center, Los Angeles, United States (2018)
- The Macallan Distillery and Visitor Experience, Scotland, UK (2018)
- Gasholders London, Kings Cross, UK (2018)
- Gasholder Park, King's Cross, London, UK (2016)
- La Nuvola (The Cloud), EUR Congressi, Rome, Italy (2016)
- Shenzhen Bao'an International Airport, Shenzhen, PRC (2015)
- Queen Elizabeth Olympic Park, London, UK (2014)
- Maggie's Centre Lanarkshire, Airdrie, UK (2014)
- In Lumine Tuo (the lighting of the Dom Church and Dom Tower), Utrecht, The Netherlands (2013)
- Burlington Arcade, London (2012)
- Marianne North Gallery, Kew Gardens, London, UK (2011)
- Infinity Bridge, Stockton-on-Tees, UK (2009)
- Armani Fifth Avenue, New York City, USA (2009)
- 3 More London Riverside, London, UK (2009)
- Sheikh Zayed Grand Mosque, Abu Dhabi, UAE (2008)
- Beijing Capital International Airport, Beijing, PRC (2008)
- The restoration of the Royal Festival Hall, London, UK (2007)
- Armani / Ginza flagship store, Tokyo, Japan (2007)
- BBC Scotland exterior lighting, Glasgow, UK (2007)
- Durham Lighting Strategy, Durham, UK (2007)
- Terminal 4, Barajas Airport, Madrid, Spain (2006)
- The interior of St Paul's Cathedral, London, UK (2006)
- The Sackler Crossing, Kew Gardens, London, UK (2006)
- 30 St Mary Axe, (The Gherkin), London, UK (2004)
- The Copenhagen Opera House, Copenhagen, Denmark (2004)
- World Squares for All (Trafalgar Square) London, UK (2003)
- Gateshead Millennium Bridge, Newcastle upon Tyne, UK (2002)
- Magna Science Adventure Centre, Rotherham, UK (2001)
- The Millennium Dome, Greenwich, London, UK (2000)
- Burj Al Arab Hotel exterior, Dubai, UAE (1999)

RIBA Stirling Prize collaborations
Speirs Major have designed lighting for a number of buildings that have either won or been nominated for the RIBA Stirling Prize for architecture.

Stirling Prize winners:

- Maggie's Centre London (Rogers Stirk Harbour + Partners) in 2009
- Terminal 4, Barajas Airport, Madrid (Richard Rogers Partnership) in 2006
- 30 St Mary Axe (The Gherkin), London (Foster and Partners) in 2004
- The Gateshead Millennium Bridge (Wilkinson Eyre) in 2002
- The Magna Centre, Rotherham (Wilkinson Eyre) in 2001

Stirling Prize shortlisted projects:

- The Macallan Distillery and Visitor Experience (Rogers Stirk Harbour + Partners) in 2019
- Maggie's Centre Lanarkshire (Reiach and Hall Architect) in 2015
- 5, Aldermanbury Square, London (Eric Parry Architects) in 2009
- The Royal Festival Hall Restoration (Allies and Morrison) in 2008
- The Dresden Main Station Redevelopment (Foster and Partners) in 2007
- The Phoenix Initiative, Coventry (MJP Architects) in 2004
- The Dance Base, Grassmarket, Edinburgh (Malcolm Fraser Architects) in 2002

== Recent awards ==
- Winner, Community + Public Realm, Lighting Design Awards 2017
- Lighting Design Winner, FX Awards 2016
- Outstanding Achievement, AL Light & Architecture Design Awards 2013 & 2015
- Scottish Design Award 2015
- IALD Radiance Award 2014
- Winner, Heritage, Lighting Design Awards 2013
- Design Practice of the Decade, Lighting Design Awards 2012
- IALD Radiance Award 2010
- PLD Recognition Award for Best New Project 2009
- IALD Radiance Award 2009
- IALD Radiance Award 2008
- Light and Architecture Award 2008
- FX Design Award for Best Lighting 2008
- IESNA Award of Merit 2007
- IESNA Award of Distinction 2007
- Lighting Designer of the Year (UK) 2007
- FX Design Award for Best Lighting 2007
- FX Design Award for Best Lighting 2005
- IALD Award of Excellence 2005
- Lighting Designer of the Decade, Light Magazine (UK) 2005

== Bibliography ==
In 2006 Jonathan Speirs and Mark Major authored the book Made of Light: The Art of Light and Architecture, a series of visual essays on lighting design. The book is co-authored by Anthony Tischhauser and published by Swiss architectural publisher Birkhäuser.

- Jonathan Speirs; Anthony Tischhauser; Mark Major (2006). Made of Light: The Art of Light and Architecture. Birkhäuser. ISBN 978-3764368609.
