= Office for Visual Interaction =

American lighting design firm

Office for Visual Interaction (OVI)
- Industry: Architectural Lighting Design
- Founded: 1997
- Founders: Jean Sundin, Enrique Peiniger
- Headquarters: New York City, U.S.
- Website: www.oviinc.com

Office for Visual Interaction (OVI) is an architectural lighting design firm founded in 1997 by Jean Sundin and Enrique Peiniger. Based in New York City, OVI specializes in lighting & daylighting design for international projects of varying scales and types, including urban master plans, cultural and civic buildings, hospitality works, and product design. OVI's design philosophy is such that light is treated as a primary architectural component, transforming spaces through its interactions with surfaces, volumes and materials. OVI is known for their visual storytelling, “approach[ing] their projects with an investigative line of inquiry, asking questions whose answers reveal the project’s underlying narrative.”

Office for Visual Interaction has won numerous awards for their work on architectural projects such as The New York Times Building, Scottish Parliament Building, The Rookery, The United States Air Force Memorial and KAPSARC (The King Abdullah Petroleum Research Center). They have collaborated with acclaimed architects worldwide, including Zaha Hadid Architects, Foster and Partners, Enric Miralles (EMBT), Grimshaw Architects, Morphosis, and Adrian Smith + Gordon Gill Architecture.

== Product Design ==
In addition to their architectural work, OVI partners with manufacturers to develop custom luminaires.

In 2004, Office for Visual Interaction won an international design competition to create a new standard streetlight for New York City. Launched by New York City's Department of Design and Construction, together with the New York City Department of Transportation, the “Citylights Competition”, drew over 200 entries from 23 countries. OVI began testing and fabrication in 2008 and in 2011, the initial LED streetlight prototypes—the first of their kind for New York City—were installed near City Hall in downtown Manhattan. Expansion continued in Times Square and with a 63-fixture installation on 125th street in Harlem, as part of the city's application of energy-efficient technology to optimize and green city operations. The design is the official streetlight for the City of New York in all five boroughs.

== Publications ==
OVI's work has been featured internationally in architectural, design, and lighting publications. In 2010, OVI's design process was showcased in the first solo lighting exhibition at the Aedes Architecture Forum in Berlin. Entitled “Lighting Powers of 10,” the exhibition documented OVI's design philosophy and methodology. Inspired by the Charles and Ray Eames films “Powers of Ten,” which depicts the relative scale of the Universe based on a factor of ten, OVI translated this idea to the architecture and lighting design industry.

In 2013, Office for Visual Interaction published the book, “Lighting Design & Process.” Printed in English and Chinese, the book was designed and illustrated with 400+ images, sketches, illustrations and graphics and was conceived as a companion to the art and science of lighting design, as well as an account of OVI's projects worldwide.

== Select works ==
- 7132 Hotel Vals, Vals, Switzerland, 2020
- Canadian Parliament - West Block, Ottawa, Canada, 2019
- 520 West 28th Street, New York, New York, United States, 2017
- Meixi Urban Helix, Changsha, China, 2017
- King Abdullah Petroleum Studies and Research Center (KAPSARC), Riyadh, Saudi Arabia, 2017
- Brickell City Centre, Miami, Florida, United States, 2016
- Presidential Library of Kazakhstan (Nazarbayev Center), Astana, Kazakhstan, 2014
- Canadian Museum for Human Rights, Winnipeg, Manitoba, Canada, 2014
- Perot Museum of Nature and Science, Dallas, Texas, United States, 2013
- Al Hamra Fidrous Tower, Kuwait City, Kuwait, 2012
- The Rookery, Chicago, Illinois, United States, 2011 (Exterior Lighting)
- New York City Streetlight, New York, New York, United States, 2004-2008
- The New York Times Building and The TimesCenter, New York, New York, United States, 2008
- Experimental Media and Performing Arts Center (EMPAC), Troy, NY, 2008
- Museo del Acero - Museum of Steel, Monterrey, Mexico, 2007
- C.V. Starr East Asian Library, Berkeley, California, United States, 2007
- The United States Air Force Memorial, Arlington, Virginia, United States, 2006
- Museum of Modern Art (MOMA) Design Store, New York, New York, United States, 2005
- The Scottish Parliament Building, Edinburgh, Scotland, 2004
- Lois and Richard Rosenthal Center for Contemporary Art, Cincinnati, Ohio, United States, 2003
- Bergisel Ski Jump, Innsbruck, Austria, 2002

== Select Awards ==
- Jovie LED, German Design Awards, Excellent Product Design-Lighting, 2019
- Meixi Urban Helix, IALD Award of Excellence, 2019
- The Rookery Building, World Architecture News Lighting Project of 2012
- New York City Streetlight, Architect Magazine Research + Development Award, 2014
- The New York Times Building, IALD Award of Merit, 2009
- Museo de Acero (Museum of Steel), AIA Award of Honor, 2009
- US Air Force Memorial, IES Lumen Award for Lighting Design and Innovation; Award of Distinction, 2008
- Phaeno Science Center, RIBA European Award Winners, European Cultural Building of the Year, 2006
- The Scottish Parliament, Stirling Prize, 2005
- Lois And Richard Rosenthal Centre For Contemporary Art, RIBA Worldwide Award, 2004
- Bergisel Ski Jump, International Olympic Committee Austrian Decoration of Science and Art, 2002
