= Dean Skira =

Croatian lighting designer (born 1962)

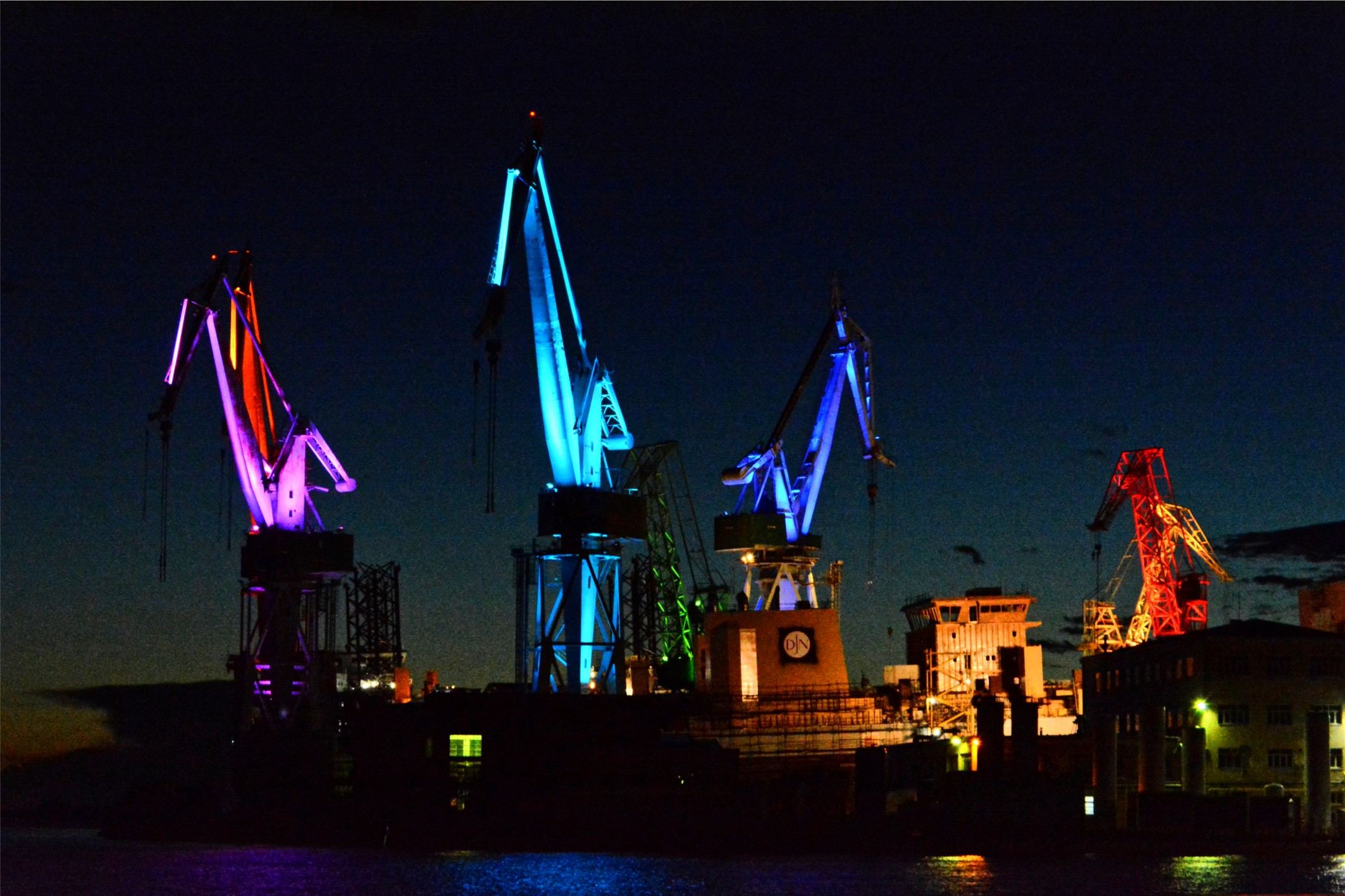
Skiras light design on cranes in Pula harbour

Dean Skira (born 20 October 1962) is a Croatian lighting designer. Skira founded his own lighting design practice in 1990 in New York City, USA. He lives and works in Pula, Croatia.

In 1986 Skira studied lighting and interior design at the Fashion Institute of Technology in New York City. Since 1995 he and his team of designers and engineers have based their work in Croatia.

Skira is a Certified Lighting Designer (CLD), a member of IALD (International Association of Lighting Designers) and the IES (The Illuminating Engineering Society) of North America, New York section. He is also affiliated with the Croatian Lighting Association.

One of Skira's best-known projects is the "Lighting Giants", in Pula, Croatia, which changed the shipping cranes at the Uljanik Shipyard into a moving lighted art installation.

== Notable projects ==
- Nime, Product Design for Delta Light (2020)
- Conform, Product Design for Delta Light (2020)
- GTC Matrix, Zagreb, Croatia (2020)
- Technical Museum Nikola Tesla, Zagreb, Croatia (2020)
- Villa Sheherezade landscape, Dubrovnik, Croatia (2020)
- Public Swimming Pool, Pula, Croatia (2019)
- Evolution Tower, Moscow, Russia (2018)
- Mestrovic Pavilion, Zagreb, Croatia (2018)
- Biennale of Architecture, Croatian Pavilion, Venice, Italy (2018)
- Polesano, Product Design for Delta Light (2017)
- Eurasia Tunnel, Istanbul, Turkey (2016)
- TSUM, Kyiv, Ukraine (2017)
- Roundabout Pula, Croatia (2017)
- Hendrix Bridge, Zagreb, Croatia (2017)
- Twisted, Light Art Installation (2016)
- Eggotrick, Light Art Installation (2018)
- Hotel Alhambra, Losinj, Croatia (2015)
- Hotel Bellevue, Losinj, Croatia (2014)
- Cikat Bay Resort, Losinj, Croatia (2015)
- Postojna Cave, Postojna, Slovenia (2013)
- Trick, Product Design for iGuzzini (2013)
- Biennale Arte, Italian, pavilion, Venice (2013)
- Hooked up Light Art Installation, Milano (2013)
- Parco della Luna, Recanati, Italy (2012)
- Design hotel Lone landscape, Rovinj, Croatia (2011)
- Lun up, Product Design for iGuzzini (2011)
- Policlinic Novamed, Zagreb, Croatia (2010)
- Park Eden landscape, Rovinj, Croatia
- Novamed polyclinic, Zagreb, Croatia
- Rident polyclinic, Poreč, Croatia
- Novi Spa & Resort, Novi Vinodolski, Croatia
- Hotel Argentina, Dubrovnik, Croatia
- Four Seasons Hotel, Baku, Azerbaijan
- Hotel Kempinski, Savudrija, Croatia (2009)
- Spa&Hotel Novi Resort, Novi Vinodolski, Croatia (2008)
- Memorial Centre Dražen Petrović, Zagreb, Croatia (2006)
- Town of Buzet, Croatia (2001)
- Cranes Pula, Croatia (2014)

== Awards and recognitions ==
- IES Award, New York, GTC Matrix Award of Distinction (2020)
- iF Design Award, Nime, Best Product Design (2021)
- LIT Awards, Evolution Tower, winner (2019)
- German Design Award, Polesano winner (2019)
- IALD Award, Roundabout Pula, Special Citation (2018)
- IES Award, New York, Eurasia tunnel Award of Merit (2017)
- Darc Award, London, Twisted Winner (2017)
- Red Dot Award, Best Product Design, Trick (2015)
- Blueprint Award, London, Trick (2015)
- "Delta of Gold" Prize at the 2014 Festival of Art and Design.
- Codega Prize for best LED installation
- Illumni Infinity award (2013)
- iF product design award (2013)
- 29th IALD Special citation Award (2012)
- LDA Winner External Luminaire (2012)
- The ARC Show Innovation Award (2012)
- IESNA Award of Merit (2009)
- International prize Dedalo Minosse for Commissioning a Building (2007-2008)
- Lutron most Unusual Installation in Europe (2006)
- IESNA Award of Merit (2002)

== Bibliography ==
In 2010 Dean Skira authored the book My light, about some of the lighting installations and artistic pieces that he has designed during the previous twenty years. The preface was written by Piero Castiglioni. The book was published by Italian publisher Lupetti Editori di Comunicazione and Croatian publisher Arhitekst.

- Dean Skira (2010). My light. Lupetti Editori di Comunicazione.Arhitekst.ISBN 978-8883913303

== Notes and references ==
- Skira, Dean (2010). My light. Croatia: Oris and Lupetti. pp. 68–69. ISBN 9788883913303.
