= Institution of Lighting Professionals =

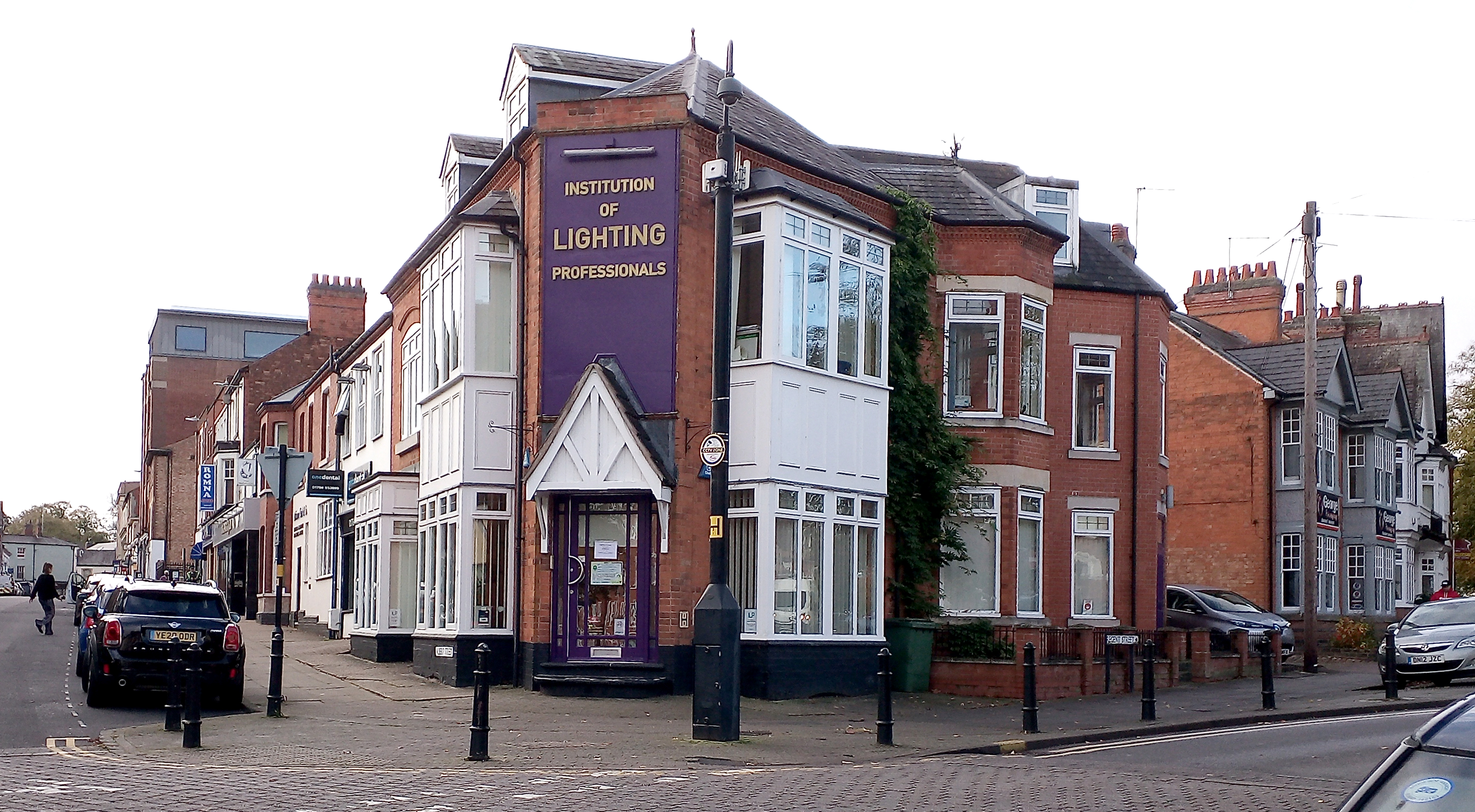
The ILP's office in Rugby.

The Institution of Lighting Professionals (ILP) is a United Kingdom and Ireland professional engineering institution founded in 1924 as the Association of Public Lighting Engineers, later known as the Institution of Lighting Engineers, and taking its present name in 2010. It is licensed by the Engineering Council to assess candidates for inclusion on its Register of professional Engineers. The Institution's address is Regent House, Regent Place, Rugby, Warwickshire, CV21 2PN.

The President is James Duffin and the Chief Executive is Justin Blades.

It is registered in the UK as a private company limited by guarantee without share capital (number 00227499). The Institution of Lighting professionals (ILP) was founded in 1924, it has about 2,000 members and 129 company or organisation members predominantly from the United Kingdom and Ireland.. Its principal object is to act as a learned Society for professionals in lighting and allied industries and as a technical and educative body for the public dissemination of technical information.

The ILP is licensed in the UK by the Engineering Council to award the professional grades of Chartered and Incorporated Engineer to suitably qualified members.."

== See also ==
- Society of Light and Lighting
