= 2012 Summer Olympic development =

The 2012 Summer Olympic development process began in 2005, following the successful London bid for the 2012 Summer Olympics, and ran until the games in 2012. While many of the plans were included in the bid portfolio, which gained the favour of the International Olympic Committee (IOC) over the four other bids on 6 July 2005, there were more details released and decisions made afterwards. The London Organising Committee of the Olympic Games and Paralympic Games (LOCOG) was created to oversee many of these developments, though such a large-scale event requires the co-operation of many other agencies. These organizations are sometimes integral parts of the London 2012 plans, while others are unrelated but can still have a great effect.

The day after the announcement saw one of the worst terrorist attacks in Britain, as London was struck by four bomb blasts. While the motivation was not linked specifically to the success of the bid it was to have an effect on the development and planning of the event.

== Timelines ==
Since the 2000 Summer Olympics in Sydney, Australia the IOC have developed a "master schedule" to ensure that the planning and development of the Games goes smoothly. Gilbert Felli, the IOC Executive Director for the Olympic Games, explained the master schedule as "a timeline of milestones that need to be met for the Games to be delivered on time." On 24 January 2006 LOCOG released full details of their plan, based partly on the IOC Master Schedule.

As of early 2005 60% of the venues and facilities were in place. The bid needed to detail the time plan for any further construction work that was required, and the London 2012 team came up with a schedule that would see all the facilities ready by 2011.

Year	IOC Master Schedule	Initial plan	January 2006 plan
2005		Site preparation for the Olympic Park	
2006	Agree a marketing and sponsorship plan; Complete the designs for a logo; Finalise the budget; Complete the review of transport needs	Construction for the Aquatics Centre begins (end of the year)	Finalise the marketing and sponsorship plan; Launch of the official logo & brand
2007	All building plans should be completed	Channel Tunnel/Stratford rail link; Construction of the Velodrome and BMX arena begins (January); Construction of the Athletes Village and three western arenas begins (Summer)	Details of all venue specifications
2008	Above-ground construction work for all venues should have started	Construction of the Media Centre and Olympic Stadium begins (Summer); Site preparation for the Olympic Park completed; Completion of the Aquatics Centre and Velopark (end of the year)	
2009		The Millennium Dome is converted into the O2 Arena in order to host the World Gymnastics Championships	
2010		Completion of the western arenas and East London Line extension	Volunteer Recruitment programme; Initial testing of events
2011		Completion of the Olympic Stadium, Athletes Village and Media Centre	Tickets go on sale

== Announcements and developments ==
=== Sports ===
- 27 October 2005: Women's boxing is officially ruled out of the 2008 Summer Olympics in Beijing, China by the IOC, but Kelly Fairweather, their director of sport, says that it is being considered for the 2012 Games.
- 11 November 2005: The Scottish Football Association (SFA) rule out the participation of their players in a Great British team in the football events. Players from England and Northern Ireland will compete together in the team, with the Football Association of Wales (FAW) still deciding on their position. The team gained automatic qualification to the competition because the UK is the host nation – as there is no British team competing in the UEFA Under-21 Championships (the qualifying tournament) it is likely to be the only time such a team will compete in the Olympics. The BOA appealed for both the SFA and FAW to reconsider their positions, quoting statistics showing the apparent public support for the team.
- 9 February 2006: An appeal against the removal of baseball and softball from London 2012 is rejected by the IOC.
- On 15 January 2008, Aldershot Army Base is chosen over Bath and Loughborough universities to be the training camp for the British Olympic team.
- 29 May 2009: After last-ditch talks prompted by a FIFA deadline, the four national federations within the UK come to a compromise regarding football participation at the Games. By that time, Northern Ireland had pulled out of any potential "Team GB". On that date, the four federations sent a letter to FIFA stating that while the Scottish, Welsh, and Northern Ireland federations would not participate in unified Olympic men's and women's football teams, they would not prevent England from fielding teams under the Great Britain banner for the Games.

=== Organisation ===
- 5 October 2005: Lord Moynihan is chosen as the new chairman of the British Olympic Association, beating David Hemery by 28 votes to 15.
- 7 October 2005: The London Organising Committee for the Olympic Games (LOCOG) has its first board meeting.
- 1 November 2005: Mike Lee, a communications director and advisor for the London 2012, resigns from his role and is replaced by Jackie Brock-Doyle.
- 18 November 2005: Jack Lemley is appointed chairman of the Olympic Delivery Authority (ODA).
- 22 November 2005: David Higgins is appointed Chief Executive of the ODA.
- 19 December 2005: Paul Deighton resigns his role as Chief Operating Officer at Goldman Sachs to take over from Keith Mills as the Chief Executive of LOCOG. Mills retains his position of vice-chairman.
- 11 January 2006: LOCOG and the ODA move into new premises in Canary Wharf, co-locating in order to improve their communications.
- 17 October 2006: Legacy Trust UK announced as new body to fund legacy cultural and sporting projects
- 18 October 2006: Jack Lemley resigns as chairman of the Olympic Delivery Authority (ODA).
- July 2007: Tessa Jowell appointed Minister for the Olympics, Paralympics and London, and Paymaster General
- July 2007: Jeremy Beeton appointed Director General, Government Olympic Executive
- 1 August 2007: John Armitt takes up post as chairman of the Olympic Delivery Authority (ODA).
- 16 January 2009: Justin King appointed principal adviser on the 2012 Olympics to Boris Johnson.

=== Venues and infrastructure ===
Some plans for 2012 Summer Olympics venues have had to change since the bid was developed.

- 12 October 2005: London Mayor Ken Livingstone announces that some venues may need to change based on the security issues raised by 7 July 2005 terrorist attacks.
- 20 October 2005: Tottenham Hotspur F.C. are told that they will not take over the Olympic Stadium after the Games finish as it will be used as an athletics venue.
- 4 November 2005: The London Development Agency (LDA) gives a compulsory purchase order to London and Continental Railways (LCR) for land required for the Olympic Park, not giving negotiations enough time to reach a settlement.
- 4 November 2005: ConstructionSkills, placed in charge of ensuring that there are enough construction workers, predicts a serious shortage of labourers.
- 10 November 2005: Airport operator BAA announces plans to rebuild one of Heathrow Airport's terminals as part of the transportation arrangements for the Olympics – it hopes to have planning permission approved in 2008 and to begin construction the following year.
- 15 November 2005: The LDA and LCR complete their negotiations for land and infrastructure at the Stratford City development.
- 1 December 2005: Architect Zaha Hadid is ordered to revise her designs for the Aquatics Centre after a specification change leads to a doubling of the £75 million estimated cost.
- 6 December 2005: The Docklands Light Railway (DLR) extension is officially opened, connecting the London City Airport to the London Underground at Canning Town as well as providing a direct line to Canary Wharf and Central London.
- 19 January 2006: An investigation by the Thames tideway strategy group suggests that sewage could overflow from the River Lea unless £1.7 billion is spent to upgrade 22 miles (35 km) of sewers.
- 9 February 2006: In an interview with BBC Radio 5 Live, Lord Coe says that comparisons between the Olympic venue development is not comparable to that of the delayed Wembley Stadium
- In October 2006, ODA chairman Jack Lemley resigned over political delays to development. Lemley claimed that in the 15 months since London won the Games, no remediation work has begun on the 757-acre (3.06 km^{2}) site in east London. He accused the organisers of failing to move quickly enough to tackle a threat posed by German bombs buried on the Olympic site, among contaminants also thought to include low-level radioactive waste and poisonous metals
- On 22 May 2008, construction began on the Olympic Stadium, three months ahead of its original August start date, due to the quicker than expected clearing of the Lea Valley site.
- On 27 May 2008, the IOC completed a three-day visit to London to assess the progress of the development. The committee was pleased with London's Olympic preparations, awarding the capital a score of 9.75 out of 10. IOC co-ordination commission chairman Denis Oswald stated: "From what we have seen, we are very confident we will have excellent facilities for the Games."

=== Ticketing ===
- 18 October 2005: Lord Coe, the chairman of the London organising committee, announces that half of the eight million tickets on sale will be priced at £20 or less. However, this did not turn out to be correct, with the cheapest tickets being priced at £20.12 and the most expensive being sold at £2012.00. Many British people were reported to be infuriated at the price, as well as the method of sale of the tickets, with some saying that it was too difficult for ordinary British people to get tickets for their favourite sports.

=== Tourism ===
- 3 November 2005: Keith Mills, the Deputy Chairman of LOCOG, speaks at the Annual General Meeting of Visit London and states that the Games could be worth £2 billion to London's visitor economy.
- November 2005: Prime Minister Tony Blair and Culture Secretary Tessa Jowell meet with Lord Coe and the leaders of major tourism and leisure groups, telling them that quick action could lead to a 25% growth in tourism.

=== Logo and graphics ===
There were two London 2012 logos: one for the bidding process created by Kino Design and a second as the brand for the Games themselves. The former is a ribbon with blue, yellow, black, green and red stripes winding through the text "LONDON 2012", making the shape of the River Thames in East London. The latter, designed by Wolff Olins, was published on 4 June 2007 and cost £400,000, as a representation of the number 2012, with the Olympic Rings embedded within the zero. The same logo was used for the first time for both the Olympic and Paralympic games.

The standard colours are green, magenta, orange and blue. The logo colours were modified to allow the incorporation of a variety of colours, including the Union Flag to promote the handover ceremony. Sebastian Coe at the launch of the logo said:

The logo builds upon everything that the organising committee has said about reaching out and engaging young people, which is where our challenge is over the next five years.

Public reaction to the logo in June 2007 was largely negative, with more than 80% of votes gave the logo the lowest possible rating. Several newspapers have run their own logo competitions, displaying alternative submissions from their readers, while several writers from news agencies criticizing the logo. A segment of animated footage released at the same time as the logo was reported to trigger seizures in a small number of people with photosensitive epilepsy, and in response, a short segment was removed from the London 2012 website. In February 2011, Iran complained that the logo appeared to spell out the word "Zion" and threatened to boycott the Olympics, but eventually did not boycott. Alan Cowell from The New York Times said that people had compared the logo to "a broken swastika or a comical sex act between the Simpsons".

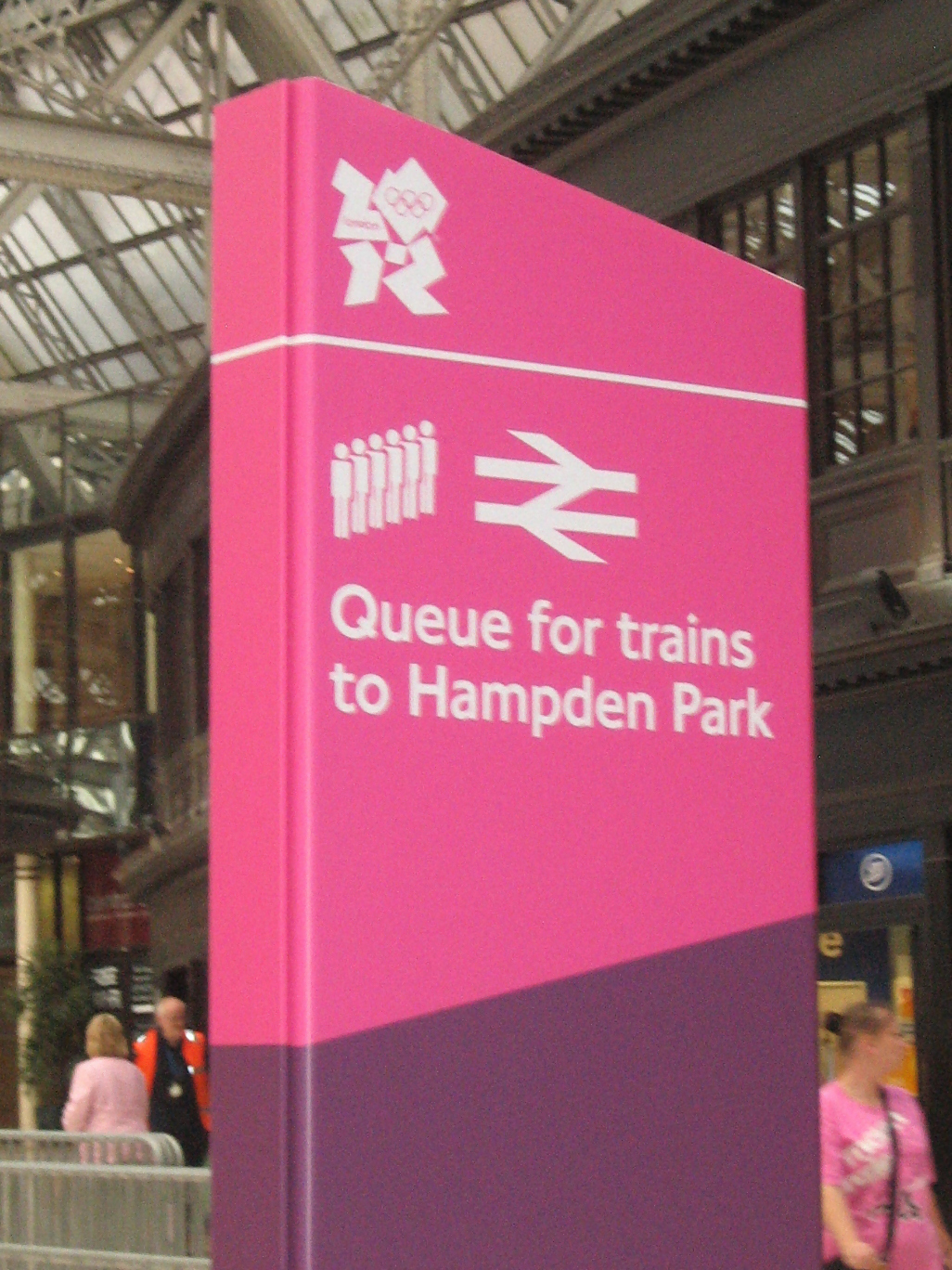
Olympics branding on a sign at Glasgow Central station, showing passengers where to queue for trains to Hampden Park

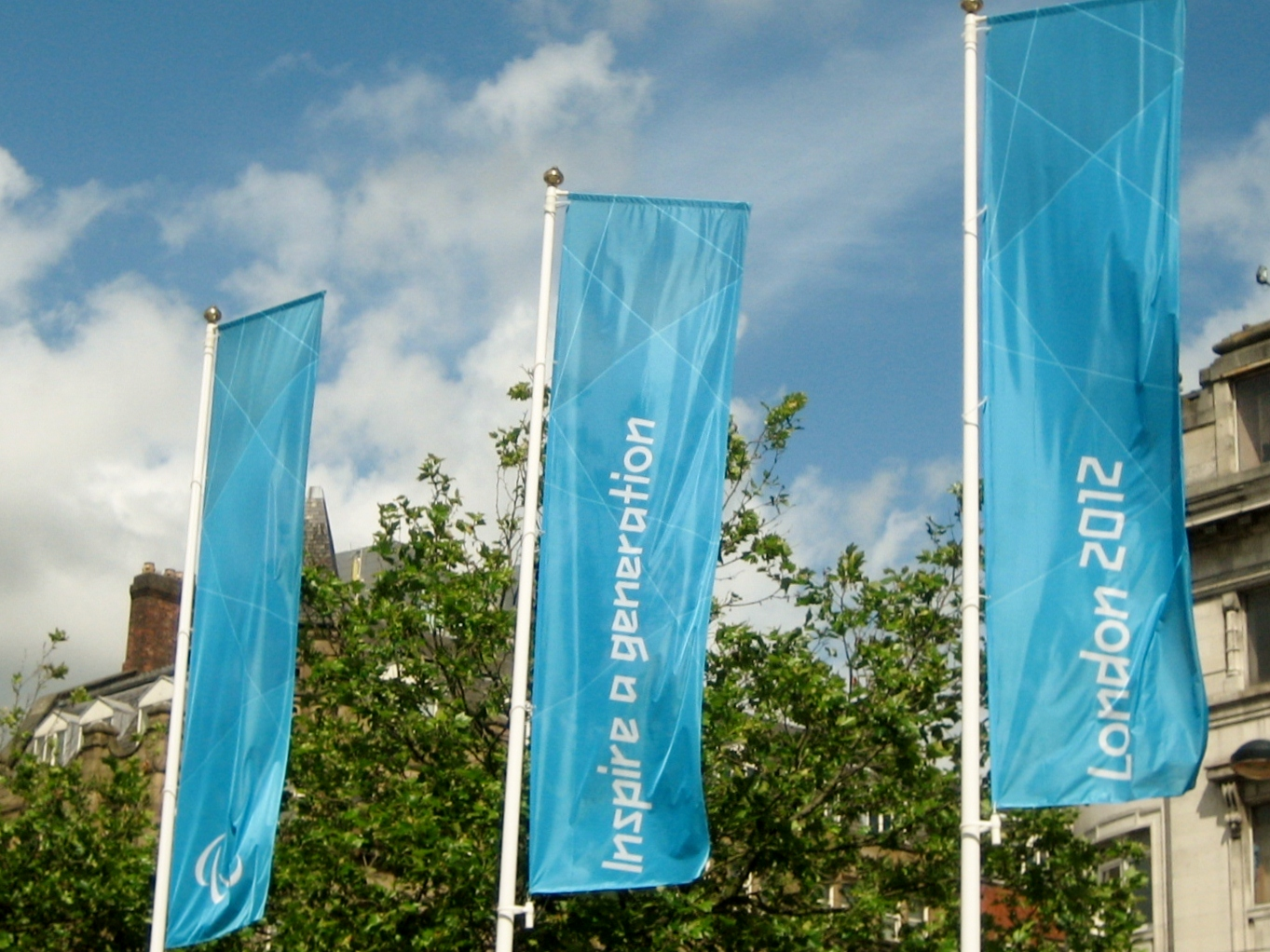
Flags like these in Piccadilly Gardens, Manchester were installed across the UK in green, magenta, orange and blue.

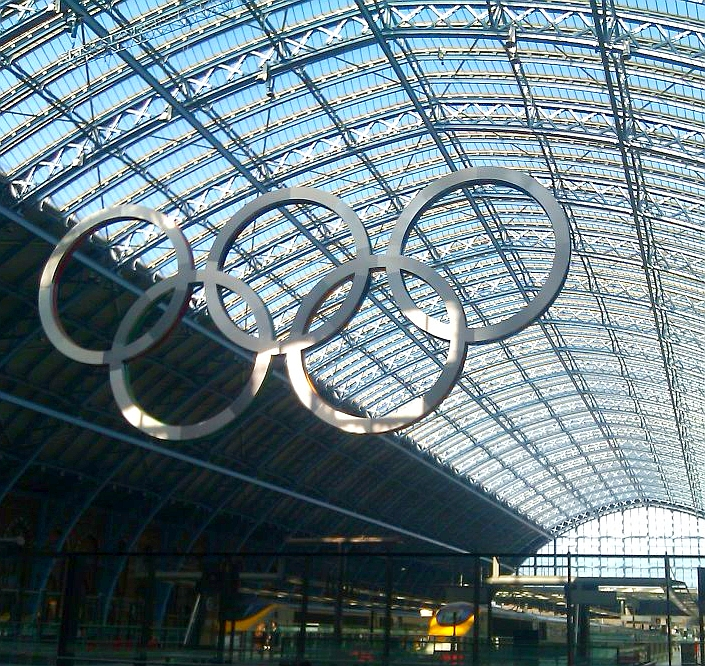
Large Olympics logos were installed at London landmarks including St Pancras Station (shown here) and Tower Bridge.

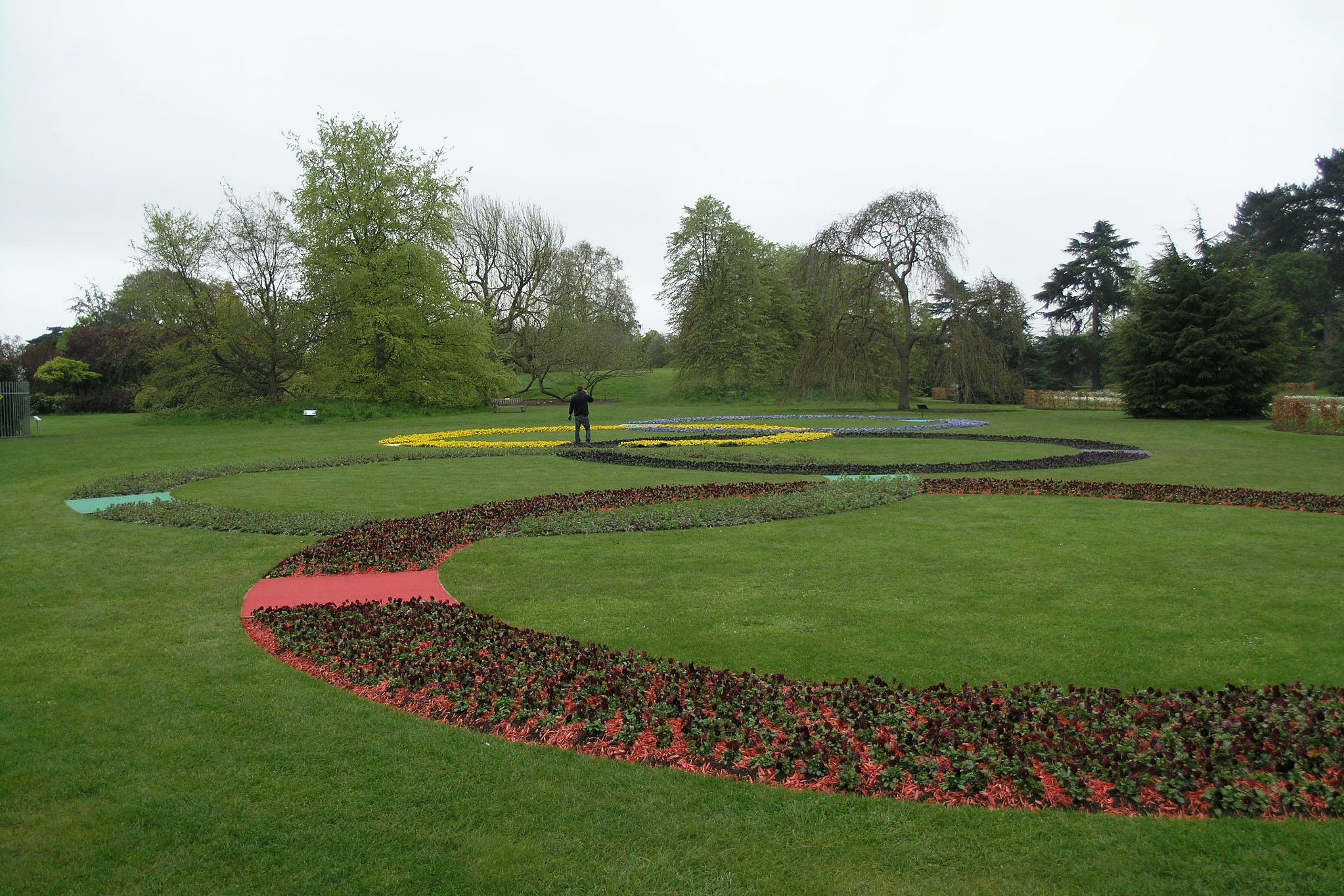
Kew Gardens in London did a large floral display of the Olympic logo.

== Events and visits ==
- 1 September 2005: Thousands of people gather in Trafalgar Square to celebrate the Olympic win.
- 12 October 2005: Elizabeth II visits the site of the Olympic Park and expresses how she thinks that it is "exciting" and "fascinating".
- 31 October 2005: Over 200 of the organisers of the London 2012 bid attend a celebratory party at Downing Street.
- 8 November 2005: Visiting London as part of a Presidential State Visit, Chinese business delegates meet with the London organising committee, highlighting the similarities between the London and Beijing games. Tony Blair says that the events will help "create a bond between the two Olympic cities and our two countries".
- 24 November 2005: A delegation from the IOC arrives to check on progress and offer planning advice.

== Awards and recognition ==
- 8 November 2005: Various aspects of the bid win awards for business and technology:
  - The London 2012 logo wins the "Best International Brand" award at the 2005 International Business Awards
  - The British Association of Communicators in Business (CIB) names the bid team "Communicators of the Year"
  - The research team wins "Research Client of the Year" at the Market Research Society Excellence & Effectiveness Awards
  - The London 2012 web site is recognised for its search engine optimisation programme.
- 9 November 2005: Accountancy Age readers vote Neil Wood "Personality of the Year 2005" for his work as financial director for the London 2012 bid and as LOCOG financial director.
- 16 November 2005: Lord Coe is awarded the Walpole Medal of Excellence by the Walpole Group, and Keith Mills is named as "Business Leader of the Year" in the 2005 London Business Awards.
- 12 December 2005: Lord Coe is given a special award at the BBC Sports Personality of the Year awards ceremony for his role in the bid.
- 31 December 2005: In the New Year's honours list numerous members of the bidding team are given recognition and join The Most Excellent Order of the British Empire:
  - Lord Coe becomes a Knight Commander (KBE), and Keith Mills and former BOA chairman Craig Reedie are given knighthoods
  - CBEs:
    - Simon Clegg, BOA Chief Executive
    - Dick Palmer, Technical Director
  - OBEs:
    - Mike Power, London 2012 CEO
    - Mike Lee, Communications director
    - Catharina Reynolds from the Olympic Games Unit at the Department for Culture, Media and Sport (DCMS)
  - MBEs:
    - David Magliano, Director of Marketing
    - Jon Armstrong, Co-ordinator of the Nations & Regions Group
    - Ayesha Qureshi, Community Affairs Manager
    - Richard Sumray, Chairman of the London Forum
    - Neil Wood, Financial Director
    - Patricia Hindley of the DCMS

== Opinions and comments ==
- 19 August 2005: There are calls to relax firearms laws which prevent British pistol shooters training.
- 17 October 2005: Rupert Mitford, 6th Baron Redesdale requests that morris dancing is represented in the opening ceremony.
- 17 October 2005: Peter Keen, in charge of planning for British success at the Olympics, expresses his concerns that the "fourth place in the medals table" target is not achievable without a significant increase in funding.
- 30 November 2005: A survey conducted by the Association of London Government's (ALG) shows that 68% of Londoners (78% in the 18–34 age group) believe that the Games will have long-term benefits for people living in London.
- 22 January 2007: Andrew Culf opines reasons for optimism for successful games outweigh reasons for worry

=== Venues and infrastructure ===
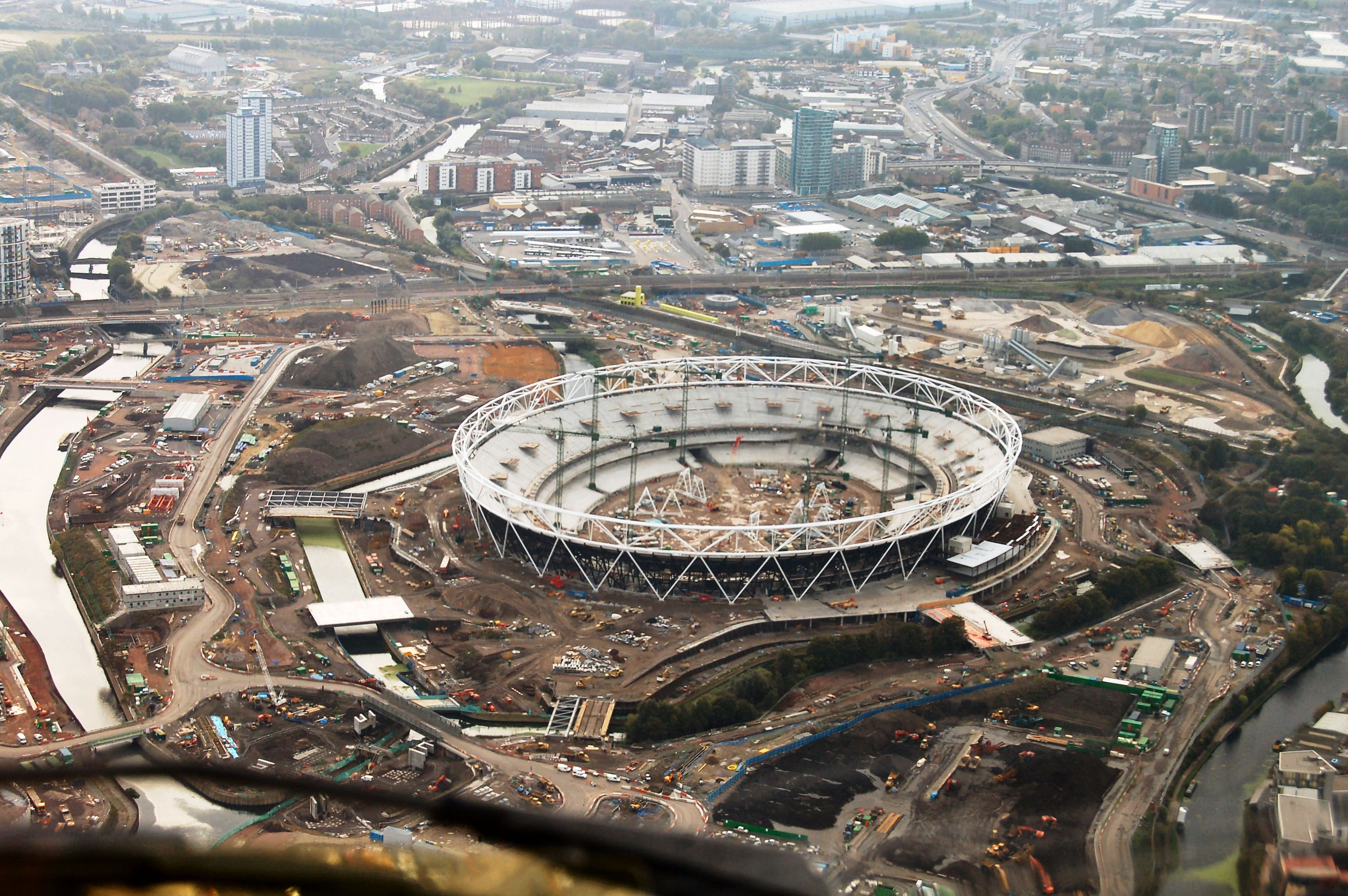
The Olympic Stadium under construction in October 2009

The 2012 Olympic and Paralympic Games will use a mixture of new venues, existing and historic facilities, and temporary facilities, some of them in well-known locations such as Hyde Park and Horse Guards Parade. In the wake of the problems that plagued the Millennium Dome, the organisers' intention is that there will be no white elephants after the Games and instead that a "2012 legacy" will be delivered. Some of the new facilities will be reused in their Olympic form, while others, including the 80,000 seater main stadium, will be reduced in size or relocated elsewhere in the UK. The plans are part of the regeneration of Stratford in east London which will be the site of the Olympic Park, and of the neighbouring Lower Lea Valley.

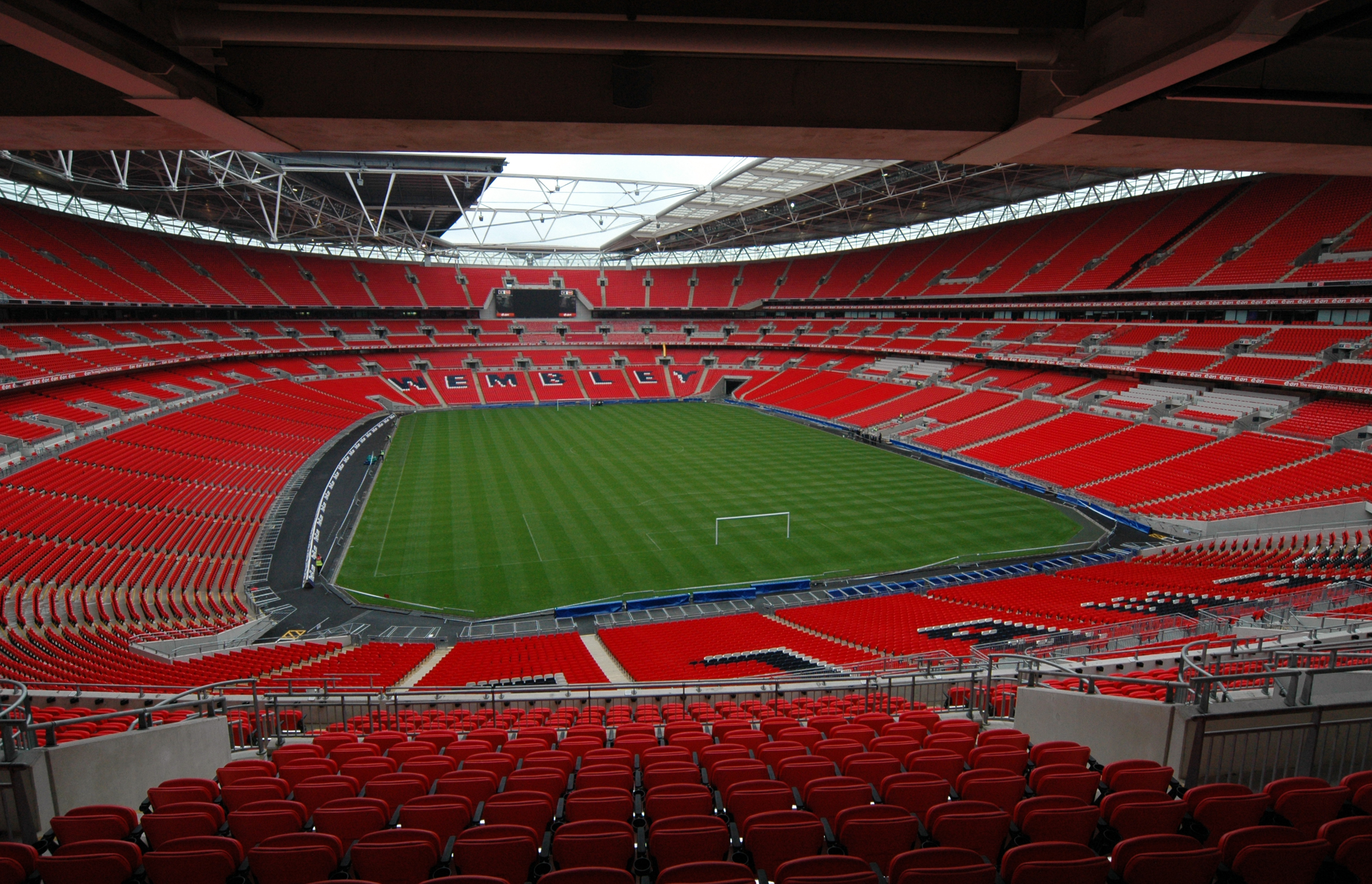
Wembley Stadium became a venue for football.

This has required the compulsory purchase of some business properties, which are being demolished to make way for Olympic venues and infrastructure improvements. This has caused some controversy, with some of the affected proprietors claiming that the compensation offered is inadequate. In addition, concerns about the development's potential impact on the future of the century-old Manor Garden Allotments have inspired a community campaign, and the demolition of the Clays Lane housing estate was opposed by tenants.

The majority of venues have been divided into three zones within Greater London: the Olympic Zone, the River Zone and the Central Zone. In addition to these are those venues that, by necessity, are outside the boundaries of Greater London, such as the Weymouth and Portland National Sailing Academy on the Isle of Portland in Dorset which will host the sailing events, some 125 miles (200 km) southwest of the Olympic Park. The football tournament will be staged at several grounds around the UK.

=== Public transport ===
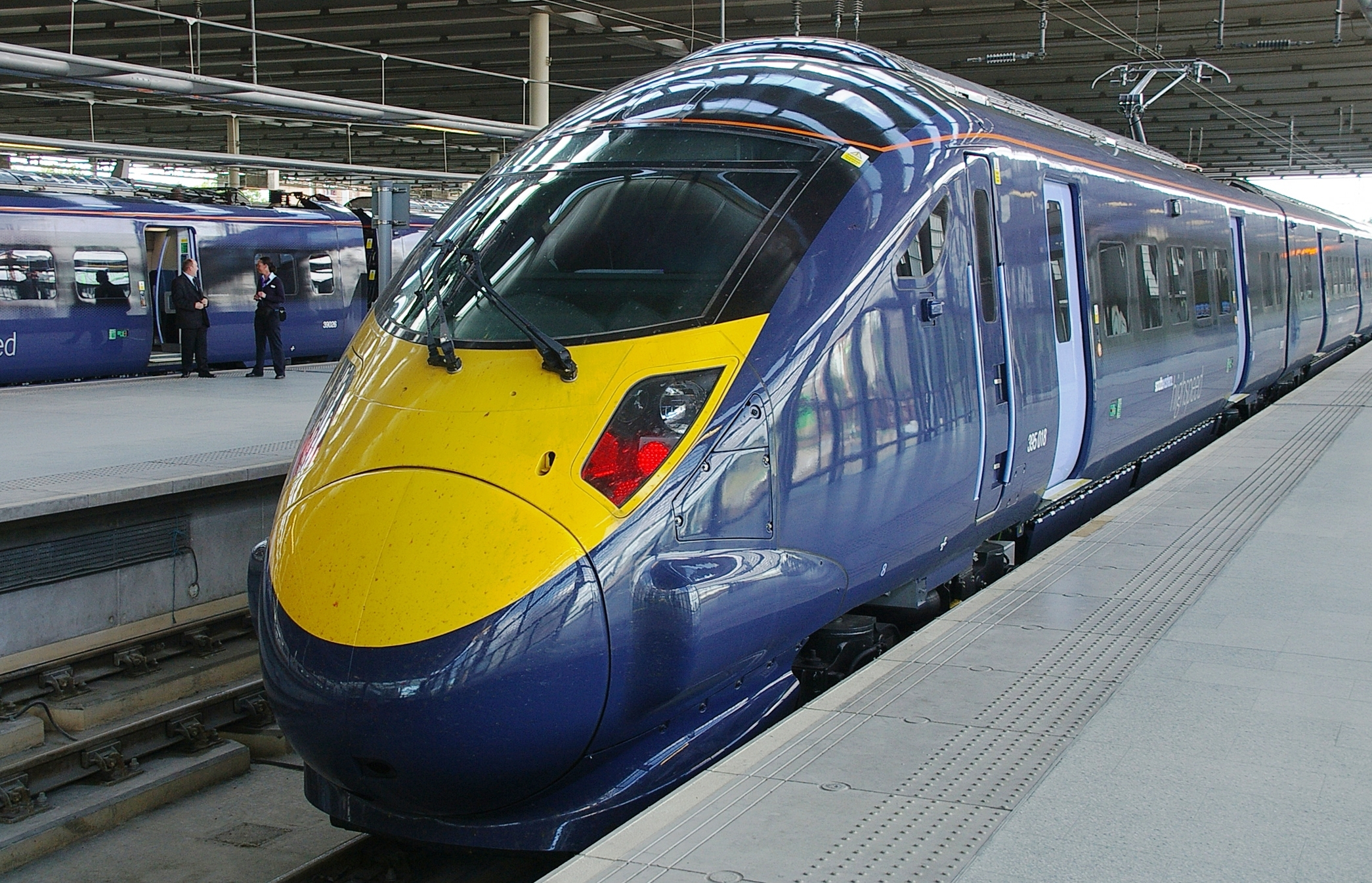
The Olympic Javelin service runs between St Pancras and Ebbsfleet, via Stratford

London's public transport was an element of the bid which was scored poorly in the IOC's initial evaluation; however, they felt that if the improvements were delivered in time for the Games then London would cope. Transport for London (TfL) carried out numerous improvements in preparation for 2012, including the expansion of the London Overground's East London Line, upgrades to the Docklands Light Railway and the North London Line, and the introduction of a new "Javelin" high-speed rail service, using the Hitachi Corporation's "bullet" trains. The platforms at Stratford International station (which are at a height designed for Eurostar trains) will be temporarily raised to accommodate the Javelin trains. According to Network Rail, an additional 4,000 train services will run during the Games, and train operators will put on longer trains during the day.

During the Games, Stratford International station will not be served by any international services as Eurostar services will pass through the station without stopping. Passengers must change at London St Pancras and travel out to Stratford with the Javelin service to reach the Olympic Park. TfL have also announced that westbound trains will not stop at Hackney Wick railway station. Pudding Mill Lane DLR station, which is located within the boundary of the Olympic Park, will close entirely during the Games.

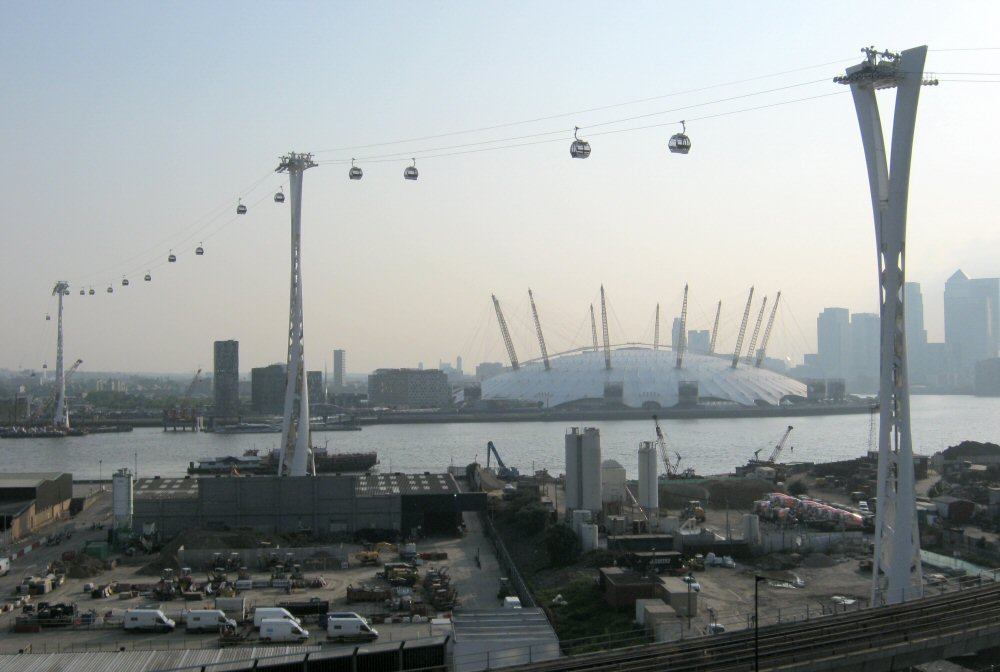
The Emirates Air Line crosses the River Thames between Greenwich Peninsula and the Royal Docks

TfL has also built a £25 million cable car across the River Thames, the Emirates Air Line, to link 2012 Olympics venues. It was inaugurated in June 2012 and crosses the Thames between Greenwich Peninsula and the Royal Docks, carrying up to 2,500 passengers an hour at a heights above 50 metres (160 ft) in the air. It is designed to cut journey times between the O2 arena and the ExCel exhibition centre – both of which are Olympic locations. The system could provide a crossing every 30 seconds.

The plan is to have 80% of athletes travel less than 20 minutes to their event and to have 93% of athletes within 30 minutes of their event. The Olympic Park would be served by ten separate railway lines with a combined capacity of 240,000 passengers per hour. In addition, the LOCOG planned for 90% of the venues to be served by three or more types of public transport. Two park-and-ride sites were off the M25 with a combined capacity of 12,000 cars 25 minutes away from the Olympic Park. Another park-and-ride site was planned in Ebbsfleet which would have capacity for 9,000 cars where spectators could board a 10-minute shuttle bus. To get spectators to Eton Dorney, four park-and-ride schemes were set up. Spectators would be dropped off at Windsor Racecourse with a bridge going over the Thames linking the racecourse to the rowing venue.

Some lanes on some roads in London will be dedicated to athletes, officials and VIPs.

Concerns have been expressed at the logistics of spectators travelling to the events outside London. In particular, the sailing events at Portland are in an area without direct motorway connections, and with local roads that are heavily congested by tourist traffic in the summer. However, the Weymouth area did undergo a major upgrade to its road infrastructure. A £77 million relief road connecting Weymouth to Dorchester was built and opened in 2011. Some £16 million was put aside for the rest of the improvements. In addition the plans removed five roundabouts to ease congestion and replaced them with traffic lights. But some residents were unhappy that the roundabouts were removed.

FirstGroup will provide the venue shuttle and park-and-ride services, services connecting peripheral park-and-ride sites on the M25 with the Olympic Park and Ebbsfleet, and a nationwide network of express coaches to the Olympic Park and the Weymouth and Portland sailing venue. The services will require around 900 vehicles in total, although some will be sub-contracted.

TfL have published information to encourage cycling as a mode of transport during the Games. Cyclists, like motorists, are not permitted to ride in the designated Olympic Lanes on London streets. Some designated cycle paths such as the Lea Valley towpath are closed to the public during the Olympics.

=== Financing ===
Ken Livingstone on the Olympic bid

I didn't bid for the Olympics because I wanted three weeks of sport; I bid for the Olympics because it's the only way to get the billions of pounds out of the Government to develop the East End – to clean the soil, put in the infrastructure and build the housing. It's exactly how I plotted it, to ensnare the Government to put money into an area it has neglected for 30 years.

— Ken Livingstone, speaking in 2008

The costs of mounting the Games are separate from those for building the venues and infrastructure, and redeveloping the land for the Olympic Park. While the Games are privately funded, the venues and Park costs are met largely by public money.

On 15 March 2007 Tessa Jowell announced to the House of Commons a budget of £5.3 billion to cover building the venues and infrastructure for the Games, at the same time announcing the wider regeneration budget for the Lower Lea Valley budget at £1.7 billion.

On top of this, she announced various other costs including an overall additional contingency fund of £2.7 billion, security and policing costs of £600 million, VAT of £800 million and elite sport and Paralympic funding of nearly £400 million. According to these figures, the total for the Games and the regeneration of the East London area, is £9.345 billion. Then Mayor Ken Livingstone pledged the Games Organising Committee would make a profit.

The costs for staging the Games (£2 billion) are funded from the private sector by a combination of sponsorship, merchandising, ticketing and broadcast rights. This budget is raised and managed by the London 2012 Organising Committee. According to Games organisers, the funding for this budget broadly breaks down as:

- 64% from Central Government;
- 23% from National Lottery
- 13% from the Mayor of London and the London Development Agency

On 18 August 2007 The Belfast Telegraph reported that jubilation over winning the right to stage the Olympic Games was becoming more muted as realisation dawns on the public of the enormous costs involved in creating facilities for the athletes. Grassroot sport cuts will fund the Olympics, government figures suggested on 19 August 2007.

In November 2007, Edward Leigh MP, criticised the organisers for significantly underestimating the cost of staging the games, suggesting they had either "acted in bad faith or were incompetent".

There have, however, been concerns over how the Olympics are to be funded. In February 2008, a London Assembly culture and sport committee report expressed concerns over the funding of the games taking away money from London's sports and arts groups. There have also been complaints that funding towards the Olympics has been to the detriment of funding other areas of the UK. In Wales, there has been criticism from Plaid Cymru about the games depriving Wales of money, by using UK-wide funding rather than English funding. The Wales on Sunday newspaper claimed former UK Prime Minister Tony Blair broke his promise to not use National Lottery funding for the Olympic games.

As at December 2009, the Delivery Authority had allocated £702 million of Programme and Funders' contingency, largely to cover the decisions to publicly fund the Village and Media Centre after it became clear private funding could not be secured on acceptable terms during the 2008 to 2010 economic crisis. According to the Government Olympic Executive and Olympic Delivery Authority risk assessments the remaining £1,270 million contingency is sufficient to manage risks to the Delivery Authority's programme.

Also from May 2010, the Olympic budget will be cut by £27 million as part of the £6.2 billion cuts by the new Conservative-Liberal coalition government.

== See also ==
- London Olympics (disambiguation)
- List of Olympic size swimming pools in the United Kingdom
