= Lemley =

Lemley is a surname. Notable people with the surname include:

- Earl Lemley Core (1902–1984), botanist and botanical educator, researcher, author and local West Virginia historian
- Elizabeth Lemley (born 2006), American freestyle skier
- Harry Jacob Lemley (1883–1965), United States federal judge
- Jack Lemley, the Chairman of the United Kingdom Olympic Delivery Authority until his resignation in 2006
- Jim Lemley (born 1965), American film and television producer based in Paris and Los Angeles
- Luther Henry Lemley (1914–1982), Railway system engineer. Designed and built the railway system for Liberia 1958–1963. Uncovered and exposed corruption in the Tubman/Talbot regimes. Author of "Liberia: An Inside Story".
- Mark Lemley, the director of the Stanford University program in Law, Science & Technology

== See also ==
- Lemley Campus, the largest of Tulsa Technology Center campuses in Tulsa, OK, USA
- Lemley-Wood-Sayer House, historic home located at Ravenswood, Jackson County, West Virginia, USA
