= Manor Garden Allotments =

Allotment gardens in London, England

Coordinates: 51°32′53″N 0°01′00″W

Manor Garden Allotments were allotment gardens occupying 4.5 acres (18,000 m^{2}) between the River Lea and the Channelsea River in Hackney Wick, London, England. They are also sometimes referred to as Eastway Allotments, particularly in the 2012 Summer Olympics planning application documents. They were cleared to make way for the Olympic site. The site was formerly in the London Borough of Hackney, but after ward boundary changes in the 1990s the footprint sat within London Borough of Newham. At the time of eviction the site was owned by Lee Valley Regional Park Authority. The "Eastway Allotments" were known more locally as "Abbott's Shoot" or "Bully Fen".

The gardens were established in 1924 by Major Arthur Villiers, director of Barings Bank and philanthropist, to provide small parcels of land for local people in that deprived area to grow vegetables. In keeping with conditions of Villiers' bequeathal that the allotments be maintained in perpetuity, the 80 individual plots were tended for decades by a tight-knit community. Many members belong to long-standing East End families, with some individuals present since the 1920s. However, in keeping with the area's increasing diversity, numerous more recent joiners represented a wide variety of ethnic backgrounds. The site was managed by the Manor Gardening Society, through an elected Committee who saw to the business of keeping the site and issuing tenancies to new gardeners. The promontory location of the site on top of a Victorian refuse pile, clay-capped and dressed with topsoil by Villiers, lent a sense of refuge and escape for the generations of gardeners that worked the land. The character of the place was semi-rural, enhanced by Villers planting plum trees down the banks of the tidal Lea, and its occupants allowing wild hedgerow to flourish alongside the vegetable gardens. This created a haven for wildlife like many of the hidden pockets of wild land in that area.

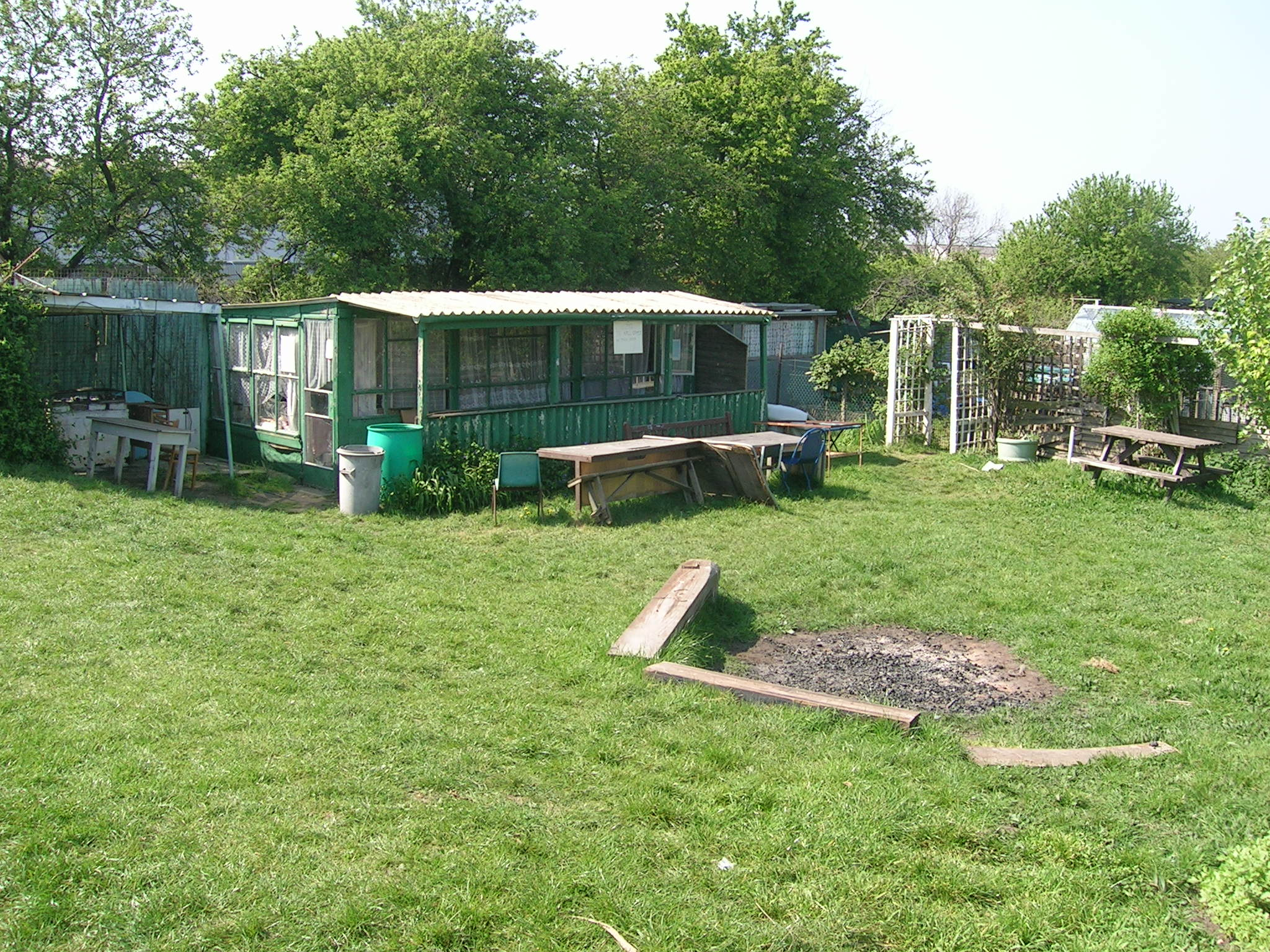
Bully Fen Community Hut and Lawn

Major Arthur Villiers was also one of the founders of Eton Manor Boys' Club in Hackney Wick in 1913. In the 1920s an area of Hackney Marshes was converted from a dumping ground into the Eton Manor Sports Ground. During the London 2012 Summer Olympics, the site which had fallen into disrepair from 1967 when Arthur Villiers died, became the Paralympic Tennis Venue. From 2014 the Eton Manor site will become the Lee Valley Hockey and Tennis Centre.

The Manor Garden Allotments were demolished in October 2007 to make way for landscaping for the London Olympics Park and the tenants moved to a temporary site two kilometres away in London Borough of Waltham Forest. The proposal was fought by the plotholders and a support group named Lifeisland presented an electronic petition to the Prime Minister. During the summer of 2007 the site remained as allotments, despite the 'blue fence' (the secure boundary to the emerging Olympic Park development) being erected and denying general public access to the area. A small group of gardeners were permitted to enter the site and tend crops for one last season. It was notable that for this period the site became a haven for the wildlife that also had to yield habitat as the Olympic land clearances got under way.

It was agreed that the allotments would be reinstated on the original site after the Olympic Games. Obligations were undertaken by both the London Development Agency and the Olympic Delivery Authority (ODA) to make provision for allotments within the Olympic Park 'greater in quality and quantity'. A promise of 2.1 hectares provision, and an offer of an equivalent replacement plot to all tenants evicted from the Eastway Allotment Site was recorded in the ODA planning permissions. Despite consultation with the ODA, the Manor Gardening Society allotment gardeners were told that returning to the original site location would be impossible, and that there was little option but to accept proposals for a split amenity, spreading the Society across two sites in the extreme Northern and Southern boundaries of the Olympic Park.

In the 2009 approved planning permissions for the Olympic Park allotment sites featured at Eton Manor and Pudding Mill Lane - these represented the 2.1 Hectares re-provision promised by the ODA (Olympic Delivery Authority). The intended provision was to be delivered by December 2014. It had long been understood that Lee Valley Regional Parks, the landowners at Eton Manor and thus future landlords of the proposed allotments had been resistant to the inclusion of the amenity. By March 2014 the planning authority for the area (London Legacy Development Corporation) had received an application from London Borough of Waltham Forest that would eliminate the Eton Manor Allotments from the plans, reducing the post-Olympic provision from 2.1 to 0.9 Hectares. Despite protestations from Manor Gardening Society, the local community, and Dame Tessa Jowell, the application was approved. The LLDC had reneged on its duty to see the delivery of 2.1 Ha of allotments within the Olympic Park by December 2014. It is then evident that there would be no allotment provision in the Queen Elizabeth Olympic Park within the approved timeframe with delivery of the Pudding Mill Lane site further delayed until November 2015.

As of March 2016, the new Pudding Mill Lane allotments have now been opened on the site off Warton Rd, nearly four years after the London 2012 Olympic Games.
