= Eton Manor Boys' Club =

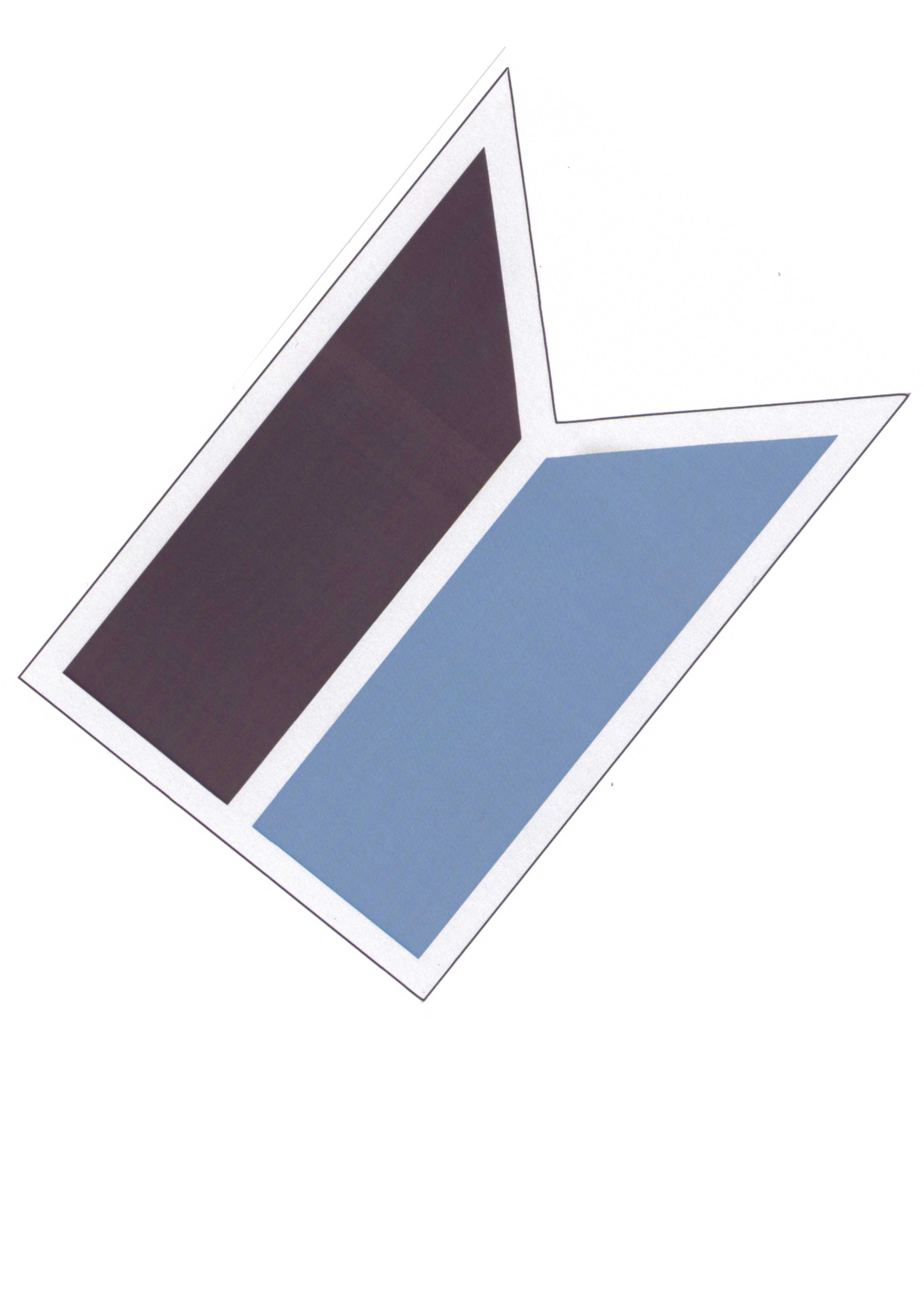

Location
- London, E20 2ST; England; 51.554°N 0.015°W

Information
- Type: Boys club
- Motto: Up the Manor!
- Established: 1909
- Founders: Edward Cadogan; Alfred Wagg; Gerald V. Wellesley; Arthur Villiers
- Closed: 1967
- Gender: Boys
- Age: 14 to 18
- Publication: Chinwag

Arthur Villiers and Gerald V. Wellesley 1917

Eton Manor Boys' Club was a boys' sports club in London, England.

== History ==
=== Establishment ===
Eton Manor Boys' Club takes its name from Eton College, which from the 1880s had run a Christian mission to raise living standards in the Hackney Wick area of the East End of London, and from the Manor Farm, bought in 1912 to build a new sports clubhouse, known as 'The Manor House' in Riseholme Street, now demolished to make way for the East Cross Route, near Cadogan Terrace and Wick Road. The Mission Church, St Mary of Eton, is still the parish church, but combined with the bombed St Augustine after the Second World War. It is now called St Mary of Eton with St Augustine. In 1973 the connections with Eton College were severed.

In 1909 four Old Etonian philanthropists founded Eton Manor Boys' Club to provide sporting facilities separate from the Eton Christian Mission. They were Gerald V. Wellesley; Arthur Villiers, the second son of Victor Child Villiers, 7th Earl of Jersey; Edward Cadogan, the sixth son of George Cadogan, 5th Earl Cadogan; and Alfred Wagg. Gerald Wellesley passed on the leadership of the club to Arthur Villiers after the Great War; Villiers remained the primary guiding force behind the club until its closure. He lived at Eton Manor Boys' Club from 1913 until his death in 1969.

The club originally only accepted boys who had been members of the Eton Mission Boys' Club. Additionally, under the club rules only boys between the ages of 13 and 16 could join. The club attempted to restricted some boys from interacting with girls through the short lived Junior Bachelors Society.

The club's coaches included well-known sportsmen such as Douglas Jardine and Alf Ramsey. Boys who passed the age of 18 were entitled to join the "Old Boys" club.

In 1920 an old rubbish tip site at the eastern end of Hackney Marshes was converted into the club's new sports ground; it became well known as "The Wilderness". Facilities included nine football pitches, two rugby pitches, cricket pitches, six tennis courts, a bowling green, a squash court and a running track. The running track was acquired from the 1948 olympics at the White City and relayed at the Wilderness and became the first floodlit running track in Britain

In the 1950s, the club had a reputation as an elite boys sporting club as well as incorporating career advice to the club's list of activities.

At its peak the club had become a leading member of the London Federation of Boys' Clubs, with success in many sports. It produced double Olympic Gold Medal middleweight boxer Harry Mallin, successful at the 1920 Antwerp Olympics and 1924 Paris Olympics and who retired undefeated; and welterweight boxer Nicholas Gargano, a bronze medallist at the 1956 Melbourne Olympics. A news article in 2010 stated that Gargano would strengthen his arms by chopping wood at the clubhouse and also learned how to box at the club.

=== Closure ===
In the mid-1960s, Arthur Villiers decided to close Eton Manor. The reasons were unclear, although the tragic death of his preferred successor David Shaw-Kennedy and both costs and the changing nature of the surrounding population have been cited as possible explanations and perhaps overwhelmingly the Greater London Council plan to build a new link road requiring the demolition of the Manor House and the Club House in Riseholme Street

The playing fields at Eton Manor fell into disuse by 2001, before being selected as part of the London bid for the proposed London 2012 Summer Olympics. The site became the venue for the 2012 Summer Paralympics tennis venue Eton Manor. Eton College has a second connection to the 2012 Olympic and Paralympic Games, as the rowing event venue was the college's own facility, Dorney Lake.

The surviving archives of the Eton Manor Boys' Club are held at the Bishopsgate Library.

== Villiers Park ==
After Eton Manor closed in 1967, The Manor Charitable Trust, which supported it, moved into the educational field and in 1968 renamed its Oxfordshire centre Villiers Park. Its other educational centre in Cambridgeshire, which opened in 1989, was also named Villiers Park. The Oxfordshire centre was closed in the late 1990s, and all operations moved to Cambridgeshire. The trust's main buildings at the Cambridge site – Cadogan House, Wellesley House and Wagg House – are named four colleagues of Villiers who were also involved in the establishment of the trust. In 2000 The Manor Charitable Trust changed its name to Villiers Park Educational Trust.

Villiers Park Educational Trust is now focused on improving social mobility in the United Kingdom. They aim to address economic inequality in the UK through delivering evidence-based programmes working with less advantaged young people in the UK between the ages of 14 and 19 to ensure they reach their full academic potential.

=== Programmes ===
==== The Scholars Programme ====
The Scholars Programme was established in 2009 and has expanded to run in seven areas across the UK. The Programme supports highly-able less advantaged students aged 14 to 19, with the aim of helping them reach their full potential. The Programme provides a four-year course of enrichment activities for each student, focusing on raising aspirations, confidence and motivation. The programme aims to build essential skills and behaviours that empower young people to succeed. The University of Lancaster, UEA, and the University of Suffolk are all lead partners in the Villiers Park Scholars Programme.

==== Inspiring Excellence ====
The Inspiring Excellence programme is a series of five-day subject-specific residential courses designed to introduce highly-able A-level students to university level study. The programme aims to inspire state school students to pursue higher education at a leading university. The charity runs approximately 32 courses each academic year, supporting over 800 students.

== Eton Manor Association ==
There is an active group of Eton Manor Boys' Club Old Boys, the Eton Manor Association. It continued to honour the former club members who died during the two World Wars at a Remembrance Sunday service at the Memorials on The Wilderness. The Olympic Delivery Authority, the London Organising Committee of the Olympic and Paralympic Games, and the Olympic Park Legacy Company which in 2012 became the London Legacy Development Corporation successively combined to provide a safe storage area of the Memorials removed during the development and use of The Wilderness site for the London 2012 Olympics; they were due to be restored to the Eton Manor site in 2014.

== Sports clubs ==
Six sports clubs originating from Eton Manor Boys' Club and the Eton Mission are still in existence:

- Eton Manor R.F.C., now playing at The New Wilderness ground in Wanstead
- Eton Manor F.C., now playing at the Capershotts ground in Waltham Abbey
- Eton Manor A.C., meeting at Waltham Forest Track and Pool in Walthamstow (young athletes) and The Cottage, Marsh Lane, in Leyton (senior athletes)
- The Otters Water Polo Club, meeting at Becontree Heath Leisure Centre in Dagenham
- The Eton Manor Golf Society
- The Eton Mission Rowing Club, founded in 1885 and with its own boathouse since 1911, which was rebuilt in 1934, is still active as a private rowing club on the Hackney Cut canal, within sight of the London 2012 Olympic Stadium

== Cultural references ==
The Wilderness

=== Film ===
- The 2005 Paul Kelly short film about the redevelopment of the Lower Lea Valley, What have you done today, Mervyn Day? has a short section on Eton Manor Boy's Club
- The 2011 Alexandra Boyd short film You Don't Have to Fight to Win is set at Eton Manor Boys' Club.
- The 2018 Alexandra Boyd feature film The Wilderness tells the story of Eton Manor Boys' Club from 1912 to 1924 and its star Olympian boxer Harry Mallin.

=== Poetry ===
- Carol Ann Duffy, the poet laureate, was commissioned by the Olympic Delivery Authority to write a poem about the history of the Eton Manor Boys' Club. This was first performed in February 2012 at the Eton Manor Rugby Club.
