= Pam Alexander =

British businesswoman and civil servant (1954–2023)

- Born: April 1954
- Died: 7 April 2023 (aged 68–69)
- Occupations: Businesswoman and senior civil servant

Pam Alexander OBE (April 1954 – 7 April 2023) was a British businesswoman and senior civil servant specialising in housing and economic regeneration in England. She chaired the Heritage Alliance and Commonplace, a digital community engagement company; and was a non-executive director of the London Legacy Development Corporation (LLDC) and of the Connected Places Catapult. Earlier, she was chair of the Covent Garden Market Authority, and a trustee of the Design Council. She was Chief Executive of the South East England Development Agency (SEEDA) from 2004 to 2011, and of the Historic Buildings and Monuments Commission for England (English Heritage) from 1997 to 2001. She was made OBE in 2012 for her services to urban regeneration in the South East.

== Early life ==
Alexander was born in April 1954. She attended The Lady Eleanor Holles School, Hampton, Middlesex between 1960 and 1971. She took an MA in Geography at the University of Cambridge, Newnham College between 1972 and 1975. She was subsequently President of the Newnham Roll Committee (the alumnae group) from 2015 to 2018 and was subsequently an Honorary Associate.

== Career ==
Alexander started her career in 1975 as a civil servant in the Department of the Environment (now part of DEFRA) as an Administration Trainee, and rose to become a senior civil servant. During this period she was involved in the development of policies for housing, social housing, regeneration, local government finance, and transport, and was involved in the sale of 10 water companies. She joined the Housing Corporation in 1995 as a Deputy Chief Executive. She left two years later in 1997 when two deputy CEO positions were merged into one, and was appointed CEO of English Heritage some months later. Whilst there she led a significant restructuring, working with the then chairman Jocelyn Stevens, but left four years later when the incoming chairman Neil Cossons felt that a further restructuring was needed. She spent the next two years as a consultant to the Cabinet Office, reviewing the effectiveness of executive agencies. She was then appointed chief executive of the South East England Development Agency (SEEDA) in 2003, where she was one of the highest paid female quango chiefs in the UK, and was listed in the Telegraph top 100 British business people in the public sector. During this period she also served four years as co-chair of the UK Government Women's Enterprise Task Force (created by Gordon Brown in December 2006), with Glenda Stone.

Alexander left SEEDA in 2011 after nearly eight years and has subsequently had a number of non-executive positions. Prominent among these are her two terms as chair of the Covent Garden Market Authority, presiding over the redevelopment of the New Covent Garden Market at Nine Elms. She oversaw the opening of a new Flower Market, the Food Exchange, and the start of construction of the new Fruit and Veg Market. She was also chair of Design Council Commission for Architecture and the Built Environment from 2014 to 2018 and deputy chair of the overall Design Council during 2018. She was also a non-executive director of Crossrail Ltd and Crest Nicholson Plc. She was chair of Commonplace Digital Ltd, and a non-executive director of the Connected Places Catapult. She was appointed Chair of the Heritage Alliance in November 2021.

== Personal life and death ==
Alexander was married, with four stepchildren and seven step grandchildren. She lived in Wandsworth, London. Her interests included choral singing, tennis, and walking.

Alexander died from ovarian cancer on 7 April 2023, at the age of 68.

== Commemoration ==
In 2024, the London Legacy Development Corporation dedicated its handbook on Creating Places that Work for Women and Girls to Pam Alexander.
