= Mark Major (lighting designer) =

British lighting designer and architect

Mark Major is a British lighting designer and architect. He is the co-founder of Speirs Major, a lighting design studio.

== Career ==
Major is an architect by training. Having previously worked with lighting designer Jonathan Speirs at Lighting Design Partnership in Edinburgh, the pair established their own lighting design studio Speirs and Major Associates in 1993. In 2010, the studio was rebranded Speirs + Major, and in 2020 as Speirs Major.

Major was Lighting Design Advisor to the Olympic Delivery Authority for the London Olympic and Paralympic Games 2012. He became Master for the Faculty for the Royal Designers for Industry in November 2019.

Major's notable lighting projects include the Millennium Dome, Greenwich, London, UK (1999), Terminal 5, Heathrow, London, UK (2008), Beijing Capital International Airport, Beijing, China (2008), and the interior of St Paul's Cathedral, London, UK (2006). He is active in the field of urban design and light masterplanning and produced the Lighting Vision for the City of London, UK in 2018.

== Awards and honours ==
In 2012, Major was named a Royal Designer for Industry for his "innovative use of light to create public space". He received the 'Outstanding Lifetime Contribution to Design' award at the FX Awards in 2015.

Major is a Fellow of the International Association of Lighting Designers.
