= Wanted (2008 film) =

Film by Timur Bekmambetov

- Theatrical release poster
- Directed by: Timur Bekmambetov
- Screenplay by: Michael Brandt; Derek Haas; Chris Morgan
- Story by: Michael Brandt; Derek Haas
- Based on: Wanted by: Mark Millar; J. G. Jones
- Produced by: Marc Platt; Jim Lemley; Jason Netter; Iain Smith
- Starring: James McAvoy; Morgan Freeman; Terence Stamp; Thomas Kretschmann; Common; Angelina Jolie
- Cinematography: Mitchell Amundsen
- Edited by: David Brenner
- Music by: Danny Elfman
- Production companies: Universal Pictures; Spyglass Entertainment; Relativity Media; Marc Platt Productions; Kickstart Entertainment; Top Cow Productions
- Distributed by: Universal Pictures
- Release dates: June 18, 2008 (London); June 27, 2008 (United States)
- Running time: 110 minutes
- Country: United States
- Language: English
- Budget: $75 million
- Box office: $342.5 million

Wanted is a 2008 American action thriller film directed by Timur Bekmambetov and written by Michael Brandt, Derek Haas, and Chris Morgan, loosely based on the 2003–05 comic book miniseries by Mark Millar and J. G. Jones. The film stars James McAvoy, Morgan Freeman, Terence Stamp, Thomas Kretschmann, Common, and Angelina Jolie. The film revolves around Wesley Allan Gibson, who decides to join the Fraternity, a secret society of assassins, after learning that his father was a member of the Fraternity.

Universal Pictures acquired the adaptation rights from Millar in 2004, and while the eventual script drifted from the comic book superhero mythos in the original miniseries, he was content to see most of the comic's darker content retained. Production began in April 2007, with filming in the Czech Republic, Budapest, and the story's main setting, Chicago. Bekmambetov's production company, Bazelevs Production, provided the majority of the film's visual effects. Danny Elfman scored the film, employing a guitar-based musical score.

Wanted opened on June 27, 2008, to positive reviews with praise for its fast-pace narrative and stylized action sequences. The film grossed $342 million worldwide. A sequel was announced shortly after the film's release, but ultimately stalled in development.

== Plot ==
In Chicago, Wesley Allan Gibson works at a dead-end desk job with an overbearing boss, takes medication for panic attacks, and lives with his abrasive girlfriend Cathy who cheats on him with his co-worker and best friend, Barry.

One evening, Wesley is told by a woman named Fox that his recently murdered father was an assassin, and that his killer, Cross, is now hunting him. When Cross and Fox engage in a shootout, Wesley panics and flees. Cross pursues Wesley, who Fox manages to help escape. Wesley awakens in a factory surrounded by Fox and other assassins.

The group's leader, Mr. Sloan, forces Wesley at gunpoint to shoot the wings off several flies, which he does. Sloan explains that Wesley's panic attacks are actually a rare ability that allows him to produce massive amounts of adrenaline, granting him superhuman strength and speed. Wesley's father and Cross were members of the Fraternity, a society of assassins that maintains balance in the world, headquartered in a repurposed textile mill. Sloan wants to train Wesley so that he may help kill Cross.

A panicked Wesley leaves the building. The next morning, he discovers that his bank account now contains millions of dollars. Filled with new confidence, he insults his abusive boss in front of the whole office and hits Barry with a keyboard. Wesley trains under the Fraternity's cruel tutelage, learning to control his abilities. When his training is complete, Sloan shows him the "Loom of Fate", which has served for 1,000 years in supplying coded names of targets through deliberate imperfections in the fabric. The Loom identifies those who will create evil and chaos in the future, with Sloan responsible for interpreting the code.

After several successful missions, Wesley has an unexpected shootout with Cross, and accidentally kills the Exterminator. Sloan sends Wesley after Cross—and secretly gives Fox a mission to kill Wesley, saying that his name has come up in the Loom. Wesley realizes that Cross used a traceable bullet for the first time (as his previous kills were all untraceable). Wesley traces it to a man named Pekwarsky. He and Fox capture Pekwarsky, who arranges a meeting with Cross. Wesley faces Cross alone on a moving train, which Fox later causes to derail. While Cross saves Wesley from falling, Wesley shoots him. Before dying, Cross reveals that he is Wesley's real father. Wesley was recruited because he was the only person Cross would not kill. After free-falling into a river, Wesley is retrieved by Pekwarsky, who explains that Sloan started manufacturing targets for profit after his name appeared in the Loom. Cross discovered the truth, went rogue, and started killing Fraternity members to keep them away from his son.

In order to finish what his father started, Wesley decides to kill Sloan. He attacks the base using explosive rats and kills the surviving Fraternity assassins in a shootout. Entering Sloan's office, he is surrounded by Fox and the remaining assassins. Wesley discloses Sloan's deception, and Sloan admits his name appeared in the Loom alongside the names of those present, saying he had acted to protect them. He gives the members a choice: kill themselves, per the code, or kill Wesley and use their skills to control the world. As the others choose to kill Wesley, Fox curves a bullet around the room, choosing to follow the code and kill everyone, including herself, and Sloan escapes in the mayhem.

Wesley, penniless again due to his bank account being wiped out by Sloan, apparently returns to his desk job. Sloan arrives to kill him but is shocked when the person is revealed to be a decoy. Wesley subsequently kills Sloan with a sniper rifle from Cross' apartment miles away. After professing his newfound free will, Wesley looks at the audience and asks "what the fuck have you done lately".

== Cast ==
- James McAvoy as Wesley Allan Gibson, a meek 24-year-old who works in a cubicle but learns he is heir to a career as an assassin.
- Angelina Jolie as Fox, an accomplished member of the Fraternity and zealous follower of their code who mentors Wesley.
- Morgan Freeman as Mr. Sloan, leader of the Fraternity and former partner of Mr. X.
- Thomas Kretschmann as Cross Gibson, a rogue assassin who has left the Fraternity.
- Common as Earl Malcolm Spellman / The Gunsmith, a professional gunman who trains others to use weapons.
- Konstantin Khabensky as The Exterminator, an expert in explosives who makes bombs and attaches them to rats.
- Marc Warren as The Repairman, an assassin who says he "breaks bad habits" of trainees by violently beating them.
- Dato Bakhtadze as The Butcher, a knife-expert who trains Wesley in knife fighting.
- Terence Stamp as Pekwarsky, a master in the science of killing. He operates as a rogue agent outside of The Fraternity and is also a bullet maker.
- David O'Hara as Mr. X, the first Fraternity member who is said to be the greatest assassin.
- Chris Pratt as Barry, Wesley's co-worker and unfaithful best friend.
- Kristen Hager as Cathy, Wesley's unfaithful girlfriend.
- Sophiya Haque as Puja
- Lorna Scott as Janice, Wesley's abusive boss.

== Production ==
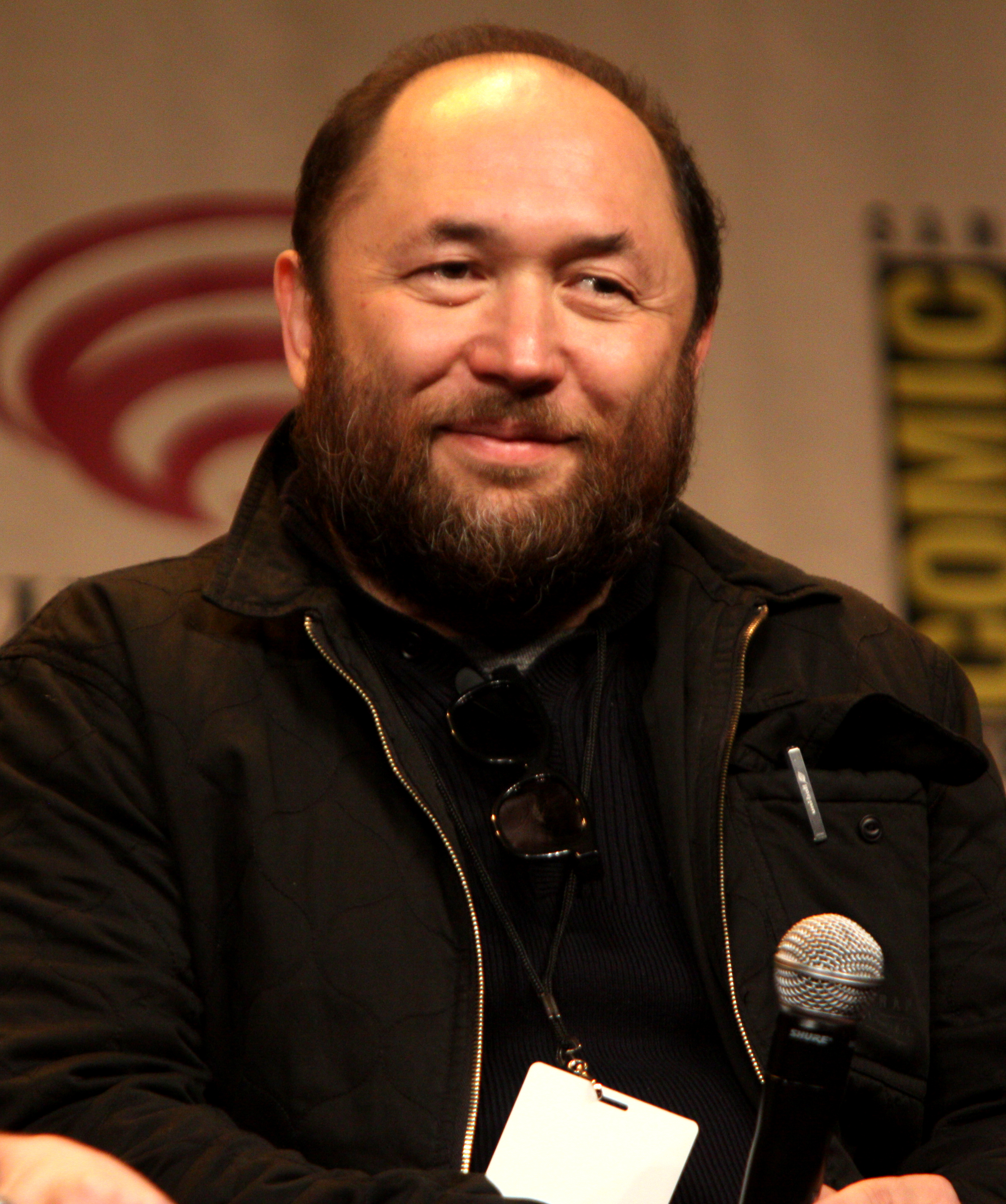
Director Timur Bekmambetov was approached for his distinctive visual style, and agreed to direct Wanted based on the project's mixture of film genres.

=== Development and pre-production ===
The comic book miniseries Wanted (2003–2004), by Mark Millar and J. G. Jones, came to the attention of Universal Pictures through executive Jeff Kirschenbaum, a comic book fan who sought a film adaptation that would be considered a "hard-R" and encouraged the studio to pick up the rights to the miniseries. By 2004, producer Marc Platt had gotten the film rights, and lobbied the studio to get Russian-Kazakh director Timur Bekmambetov, as Platt considered that the visual style and sensibility Bekmambetov showed in Night Watch (2004) and its sequel Day Watch (2006) fit Wanted in the sense that "the comic is dark and edgy but it also has an ironic, comedic tone beneath its violent action." In December 2005, Bekmambetov was hired to direct, his first English-language film, and writers Derek Haas and Michael Brandt were assigned the script. Bekmambetov described the original comic as "risky and very provocative", with "a twist and good characters", and declared that the thing that attracted him the most in Wanted was how it went through various film genres in its plot: "It's a comedy, a tragedy, a drama, a melodrama. Every scene, we change genres and that's why our movie is different."

Universal was initially reluctant on giving a potentially lucrative action film to a filmmaker who had never made an English-language film, but Platt convinced the studio that he could "create an environment that would allow Timur to be himself as a filmmaker and exercise his creative muscles."

Millar was unhappy with the first draft of the screenplay, considering the approach to be "too tame" and "a little bit Americanized" given he wanted "basically be the opposite of the Spider-Man movie, the idea of someone getting powers and realizing they can do what they want, then choosing the dark path." The author only started to support the direction the project was taking once Bekmambetov "came in with his Eastern European madness" and the intention of coming closer to the spirit of the book. Bekmambetov said that he would take liberty in adapting the comic book's world: "It's difficult for me to just follow. It's interesting for me to create. I feel a little bit different how this world has to be executed." In July 2006, screenwriter Chris Morgan was hired to revise the third act of Haas and Brandt's script. Haas and Brandt returned to refine the character of Wesley Allan Gibson, which they had established in their first draft.

Millar saw previsualized footage of the film and said that it exceeded his expectations for the adaptation. He described its first half as being close to the source comic, and added the ending was similar though it was relocated elsewhere from the comic's original setting. The superhero costumes in the series were also removed, with the exception of the leather attire worn by Wesley and Fox. Incidentally, this had been Millar's intent when writing the miniseries, but he and artist J. G. Jones had forgotten to. Millar said, "I wanted them to have those powers and then just wear those costumes for the initiation, but just for one panel. And then I forgot." Millar also stated that he would have liked to keep the supervillain mythos that dictates the original comic in the film. Millar was favorable to most of the changes in the storyline, which includes the story arc of the Fates issuing death orders in line with the series' original theme of predestination.

=== Casting ===
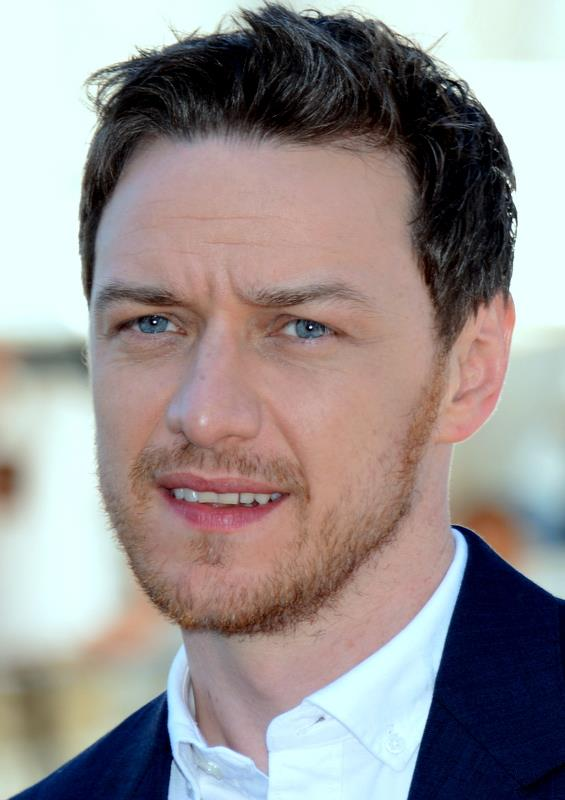
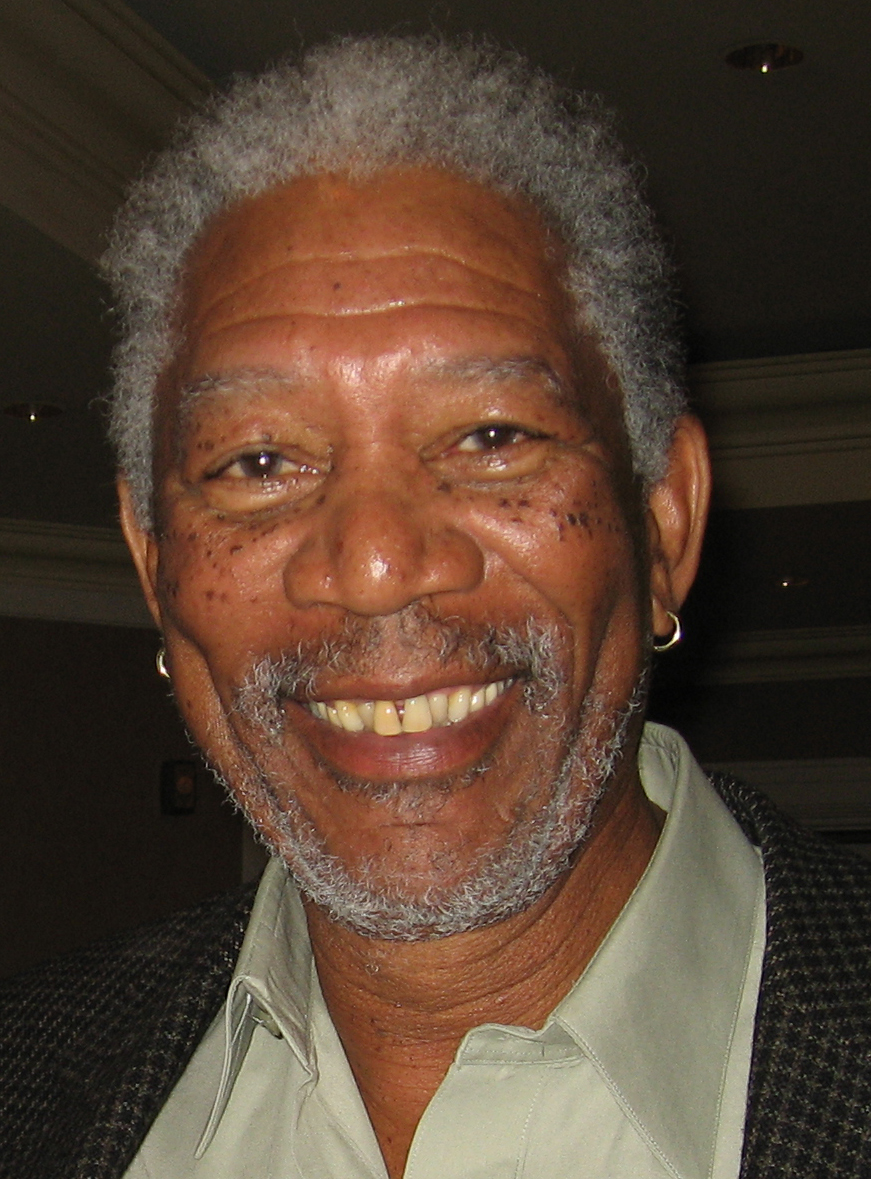
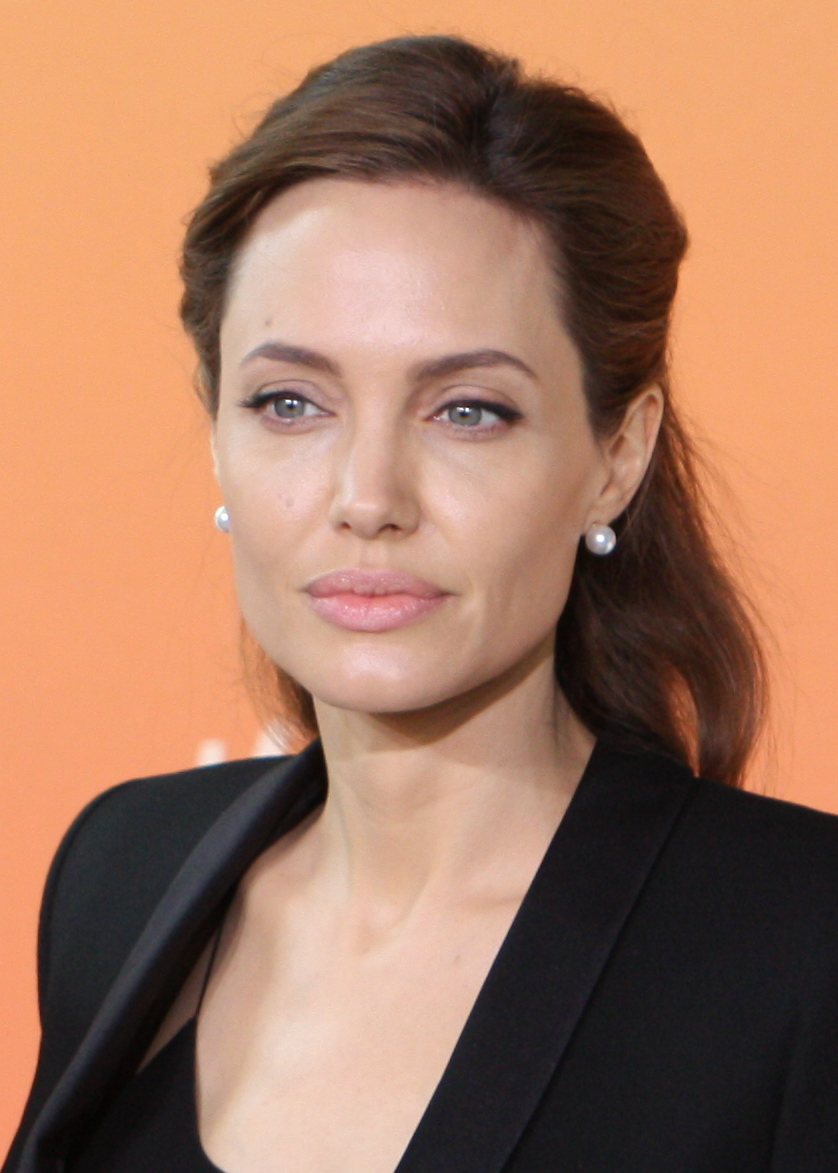
Top to bottom: James McAvoy, Morgan Freeman, and Angelina Jolie star in the film as Wesley, Sloan and Fox, respectively.

James McAvoy, who had screen-tested for the lead role early in 2006, was initially rejected because the studio was seeking an actor with conventional Hollywood leading man looks and physique. McAvoy was later recalled, being considered to be the "runt of the litter" among those who tested. According to McAvoy, "They [ultimately] wanted someone geeky." McAvoy was cast in the role in October 2006. The Scottish actor, who portrays an American in the film, worked out to improve his physique for the film's action scenes, and suffered several injuries during shooting which included a twisted ankle and an injured knee.

Angelina Jolie was cast in March 2007, after screenwriter Dean Georgaris rewrote the screenplay to tailor the role of Fox for her. Mark Millar became much more enthusiastic about the project after learning that Jolie had accepted the role of Fox, saying "the only way they could have got a bigger star to play this role is if they'd hired Tom Cruise in drag." Jolie decided to make Fox seem "distant and unattainable" by having her silent in many scenes. She mentioned Clint Eastwood, who had recently directed her in the film Changeling, as a possible influence for this aspect of her performance. Furthermore, she asked for Fox to get killed, suggesting that "[i]f she was to find out she had killed people unjustly and was a part of something that wasn't fair, then she should take her own life." Although she had "13 known tattoos," she felt the need to add some temporary ink to that collection for her role in this film.

Common became interested in the role of Gunsmith due to both the script and the prospect of working with McAvoy, Jolie, and Morgan Freeman. Common learned a great deal about firearms as preparation for the role, but said he is not a strong supporter of guns in real life. Konstantin Khabensky, who starred in Bekmambetov's Night Watch, was cast so that the director would have a familiar face around. British television veteran Marc Warren agreed to work in the film because he always wanted to be in a Hollywood blockbuster. Thomas Kretschmann originally intended to pick up the comic series after being cast, but Bekmambetov convinced him not to. Kretschmann said that he undertook "excessive gun training" to "make sure I look good and I look like I know what I'm doing". Kristen Hager originally auditioned for Fox, but accepted the role of Cathy, considering it "fun to play".

=== Filming ===
Location plate shooting took place in Chicago in April 2007. Several chase scenes, including one with a low flying helicopter, were shot in Chicago over two days, on Wacker Drive along the Chicago River, between Columbus Drive and LaSalle Street. The opening scene was filmed using the Carbide & Carbon Building. Production moved to the Czech Republic later in May, scheduled for 12 weeks of shooting, which included a scene in Pernštejn Castle. Using a former sugar factory in Prague, production designer John Myhre constructed a large textile factory as part of an industrial world, the setting of a mythological environment in which looms create fabrics that weavers interpret as assassination orders. Afterward, filming moved to Budapest, then returned to Chicago in August. While the actors performed many of their own stunts, with free running and parkour in some of the action scenes, and Angelina Jolie being actually strapped to the hood of a moving Dodge Viper, some of the especially high-risk sequences required digital doubles instead. Two full-sized train cars were built, a Chicago "L" for a training scene where Fox and Wesley run atop a train, and a Czech Pendolino for the derailment, which was stationed in a gimbal equipped with hydraulics to allow the car to tilt and roll as the train crashed. The film originally had both an alternate opening and an alternate ending. The alternate opening, a flashback to ancient times describing the history of the Fraternity and the Loom of Fate, is available on the special edition DVD and Blu-ray.

=== Visual effects ===
Eight visual effects companies worked on the film's 800 visual effects shots, the majority of which was done by Bekmambetov's company Bazelevs Production. The first visual effects supervisor, Jon Farhat, was forced to withdraw from the production due to illness and was replaced by Stefen Fangmeier, who accepted the task as Wanted would only require four months of work. Once Fangmeier visited Bazelevs in Moscow, the effects were behind schedule, with only 12 finished composites out of the planned 500. Fangemier then brought in two other supervisors to assist him in completing many shots per week, ensuring the job was finished by the deadline. The supervisor described this process as "a creative challenge on one hand, but on the other also a significant production challenge." The main contributor was London-based Framestore CFC, responsible for the climactic train crash.

=== Music ===
Danny Elfman wrote the film's score, a job he accepted for being a fan of Bekmambetov's previous films. Considering the film to be a "weird, twisted, sarcastic thing," Elfman decided to make a guitar-based soundtrack, with the "nastiest sounds" and a "heavy metal approach." This included a rock song written and performed by Elfman, "The Little Things", which is featured throughout the film and on the end credits. The film score has been released on June 24, 2008, in North America by Lakeshore Records.

== Release and promotion ==
Wanted was initially set to be released in theaters on March 28, 2008. However, in December 2007, Universal Pictures announced that it would be pushing back the release date to June 27, 2008, as the studio considered that the film had the potential to stand among the blockbusters that would be released during the United States summer. The film's world premiere happened at the LA Film Festival on June 19, with Wanted acting as the festival opener. Given the Russian origin of the director, Universal released a specially localized version in Russia. The literary translation of the English dialogue was written by the writer Sergei Lukyanenko. Several texts appearing on the screen and important for the plot were translated using CGI, without using subtitles or a voice-over translation. Several famous Russian actors, most of which were also in Bekmambetov's Night Watch and Day Watch, dubbed the main characters, and Konstantin Khabensky dubbed himself as The Exterminator. James McAvoy also provided some words in Russian for Wesley Allan Gibson. Danny Elfman's song "The Little Things" received a version in Russian, performed by Elfman himself, and Bekmambetov also directed a music video for the band Delta as part of a viral marketing campaign in Russia.

=== Theatrical run ===
Wanted premiered in 3,185 theaters and earned $50,927,085 in its opening weekend, placing it at second place behind WALL-E. It was the best opening ever for an R-rated film released in June, only surpassed four years later by Prometheus and Ted. Overall, it achieved the seventh-highest opening weekend for an R-rated film, after The Matrix Reloaded, The Passion of the Christ, 300, Sex and the City, Hannibal and 8 Mile. Internationally, the film grossed $33 million on its opening weekend, breaking records in Russia and South Korea. Wanted earned $134,508,551 in the United States and $207,954,512 internationally for a worldwide box office gross of $342,463,063 against a budget of $75 million.

=== Home video ===
Wanted was released on DVD and Blu-ray on December 2, 2008, in the United States. Two versions were released, including a single-disc DVD and a two-disc edition of both DVD and Blu-ray. A collectible two-disc gift-set DVD also included collectible postcards, a lenticular film cel in an acrylic frame, and a photobook of the Assassins. The DVD debuted at second place on the charts (behind The Chronicles of Narnia: Prince Caspian), and generated $66.7 million in revenue by February 2009. The Blu-ray debuted at first place on the charts.

=== Video games ===
Sweden-based developer Stillfront AB launched a browser game based on Wanted in April 2008. The Wanted "Fan Immersion Game" was a massively multiplayer online role-playing game where players took the roles of Fraternity hitmen, performing assassination missions, upgrading weapons and ammunition, and creating alliances or rivalries with other players. A video game sequel to the events of the film, Wanted: Weapons of Fate, was released in March 2009. It was developed by GRIN, and published by Warner Bros. Interactive Entertainment for Microsoft Windows, PlayStation 3, and Xbox 360.

== Reception ==
=== Critical response ===
Wanted received positive reviews from critics. On the review aggregation website Rotten Tomatoes the film holds an approval rating of 71% based on 205 reviews, with an average rating of 6.6/10. The site's critics consensus reads: "Wanted is stylish, energetic popcorn fare with witty performances from Angelina Jolie (playing an expert assassin), James McAvoy, and Morgan Freeman that help to distract from its absurdly over-the-top plot." Metacritic assigned the film a weighted average score of 64 out of 100 based on 38 critics, indicating "generally favorable reviews". Audiences polled by CinemaScore during Wanted's opening weekend gave the film an average grade of "B+" on an A+ to F scale.

Roger Ebert of Ebert & Roeper wrote "Wanted slams the pedal to the metal and never slows down. Here's an action picture that's exhausting in its relentless violence and its ingenuity in inventing new ways to attack, defend, ambush and annihilate". Richard Roeper wrote, "It's made for fans of films that really just want to see some great visuals, some amazing sequences and some terrific performances."

Lisa Schwarzbaum of Entertainment Weekly encapsulated many critics' views, writing that "Wanted is kind of unintelligible and idiotic. Also kind of nasty and brutish. And also undeniably kind of fun..." Likewise, Tom Long of The Detroit News wrote, "Wanted may be the most absolutely stone bonkers, crazy-good movie of the century. Or it may be a gargantuan piece of trash. Chances are it's a combination of the two. But man, does it rock." Claudia Puig of USA Today found the "thrilling stunts and hyperkinetic action scenes [to be] the undisputed stars of this surprisingly entertaining film."

Conversely, Josh Rosenblatt of The Austin Chronicle denounced those same attributes, saying, "If Maxim magazine ever decides to branch out into filmmaking, Wanted is just the kind of ear-throttling nonsense it's bound to produce". David Fear of Time Out New York called it "the cinematic equivalent of an energy drink. The film keeps artificially pumping your adrenal glands with mindless, malnutritional sensations, only to leave you crampy and cranky minutes later. ...[T]his exercise in ultraviolence then insults us by having a beaten, bloodied McAvoy inform viewers that he used to be a loser 'just like all of you.'" Frank Lovece of Film Journal International, one of few mainstream critics to have read the comic-book miniseries, wrote that the film compared poorly with the source material. Noting that the hero in the comic goes even further, "breaking the fourth wall and positioning himself so that he's 'prison-raping' and taunting the reader for having liked the series", Lovece found that, "[w]hile Millar may have contempt for his readers—and, by extension, the medium in which he works—at least he has his own vision, and gets it across with style and wit"; qualities that, in Lovece's opinion, the movie lacked.

In the comics press, Erik Amaya of Comic Book Resources wrote that "[t]he film's biggest faults lie in how far it strays from the source" and that "[i]f you've ever seen any movie about leather-clad assassins, you already know how this film plays out. The speed and skill of the movie-making balance out those faults, however." Tom McLean of Newsarama noted that, while the story deviated strongly from the source, the movie "stands out as a highly entertaining action film that preserves the comic's core premise and cheeky attitude while taking the story into very different but still satisfying territory."

Among European critics, Peter Bradshaw of The Guardian wrote that the film "looks as if it has been written by a committee of 13-year-old boys for whom penetrative sex is still only a rumour, and the resulting movie plays like a party political broadcast on behalf of the misogynist party", concluding, "In an ideal world, the title would have the word 'Not' tacked on to the front." Kim Newman, writing in Empire, praised Bekmambetov as "the most exciting action-oriented émigré since John Woo" and commented that the film's gruesome violence "hint[s] at the comic's uncomfortable suggestion that escapism is merely a licence to become monstrous."

=== Accolades ===
Award	Category	Recipient	Result
Academy Awards	Best Sound Editing	Wylie Stateman	Nominated
Academy Awards	Best Sound Mixing	Chris Jenkins, Frank A. Montaño, and Petr Forejt	Nominated
Critics' Choice Awards	Best Action Movie		Nominated
Empire Awards	Best Sci-Fi/Superhero Movie		Won
MTV Movie Awards	Best Female Performance	Angelina Jolie	Nominated
MTV Movie Awards	Best Kiss	James McAvoy and Angelina Jolie	Nominated
MTV Movie Awards	Best WTF Moment	Curved Bullet Kill (Angelina Jolie)	Nominated
Saturn Awards	Best Fantasy Film		Nominated
Screen Actors Guild Awards	Outstanding Performance by a Stunt Ensemble		Nominated

== Possible sequel ==
Even before the film's release, Mark Millar announced director Timur Bekmambetov was planning a sequel, though Millar denied that he would write a sequel to the comic book (though he later would in 2023). He was instead creating a story along with the producers, that would follow the first film's idea of an international guild of assassins. Terence Stamp described Pekwarsky as "something that's written for a sequel", and Common expressed interest in a prequel, feeling that both The Gunsmith and Fox deserved more exposition.

Chris Morgan would return to write the sequel's screenplay, but departed in April 2009 due to "excessive workload", leaving the task to Evan Spiliotopoulos. In June 2009, Bekmambetov said that pre-production for Wanted 2 was about to get started, with filming scheduled to begin in late fall or winter. The film will have a reported budget of $150 million and will be shot in the United States, India, and Russia. He also added that some of the characters would resurrect, particularly Fox and The Exterminator. On September, the director added that even without a finished script Bazelevs had already done previsualization of the action scenes. In 2010, after reports that Angelina Jolie had pulled out of the sequel, Millar said that the script would be rewritten to remove Fox's return, so production could start that year for a late 2011 release. Eventually the production did not take off, leading Bekmambetov to work on Abraham Lincoln: Vampire Hunter instead.

In a 2011 Q&A, producer Jim Lemley said that "Wanted 2 sounds like it will not happen any time soon if at all". That same year, James McAvoy said, regarding the sequel, "I think the studio is keen to make it, and we really want to make it, but we want to make it if it's right and when it's right, and that might not be ever." McAvoy also expressed interest in a sequel focusing on a character other than Wesley. Universal later brought Wanted screenwriters Michael Brandt and Derek Haas to write the sequel, which Haas described as happening "right after the events that just happened; it'll pick up Wesley a few years later and go back in for another round", while also being "Fox-less and loom-less." Haas would later detail that the script featured a new female protagonist, who Wesley would recruit "sort of in the Fox role." Bekmambetov declared during the interviews for Abraham Lincoln: Vampire Hunter that after many years of indecision as the Wanted sequel stalled in development, he proposed an idea to the screenwriters wherein the plot followed Wesley while featuring "a great twist."

McAvoy declared that since he "had a blast making the first Wanted", he would make a sequel regardless of the quality of the script; however, he also acknowledged that the extended time the film spent in development "suggests to me that they're not finding it very easy to come up with a story that they're passionate about, so we'll have to wait and see." In 2014, McAvoy acknowledged that a potential sequel has been in the talks, saying he "had a couple of versions of script thrown my way" while adding that Universal is still waiting for the right screenplay. In June 2020, Bekmambetov expressed renewed interest in a sequel, perhaps as a computer screen film because "I cannot imagine an assassin in today's world would run with a gun. Why? He will use drones, he will use computer technology, probably."

== See also ==
- Norns, who "twine the threads of fate"
