= Petr Forejt =

Czech sound engineer

- Born: 18 February 1968 (age 58); Prague, Czechoslovakia
- Occupation: Sound engineer
- Years active: 1990-present

Petr Forejt (born 18 February 1968) is a Czech sound engineer. He was nominated for an Academy Award in the category Best Sound for the film Wanted. He has worked on more than 40 films since 1990.

== Selected filmography ==
- Wanted (2008)
