= Government Olympic Executive =

The Government Olympic Executive (GOE), a unit within the United Kingdom Department for Culture, Media and Sport, was the lead government body for coordinating the London 2012 Olympics. The GOE reported through the DCMS Permanent Secretary to the Minister for Sports and the Olympics, Hugh Robertson. It focused on oversight and assurance of the Games and the 2012 legacy before and after the Games that will benefit London and the UK.

The GOE was led by Director General Jeremy Beeton. GOE employed at least 77 other staff.
