= London Olympics =

London Olympics or London Games may refer to:

- 1908 Summer Olympics, Games of the IV Olympiad
- 1944 Summer Olympics, Games of the XIII Olympiad, cancelled due to World War II
- 1948 Summer Olympics, Games of the XIV Olympiad
- 2012 Summer Olympics, Games of the XXX Olympiad

== See also ==
- 2012 Summer Paralympics, XIV Paralympic Games
