= Jim Lemley =

American film and television producer

- Born: March 9, 1965 (age 61); Seattle, Washington, US
- Education: University of Idaho
- Occupations: Film and television producer
- Notable work: Wanted
- Children: 1
- Parent: Jack Lemley (father)

Jim Lemley (born March 9, 1965) is an American film and television producer based in Paris best known for his work on the action-thriller film Wanted.

== Early life ==
Born March 9, 1965, Jim is the son of the engineer Jack Lemley. Jack Lemley was the Chief Executive of TransManche Link, the consortium that built the Channel Tunnel, which is the largest privately financed construction project in history. Jack Lemley was awarded the Commander of the Order of the British Empire by Queen Elizabeth II for his work on the Channel Tunnel.

== Career ==
=== Early career ===
Lemley started his career in New York City working for record label Island Records. It was during his stint with Island that he became interested in film while working on U2's documentary Rattle and Hum. "I got to know the guys and be involved in the shooting, I realized that my interest in music was a portion of the movie-making process," he said of his inspirational experience. Not long after joining Island Records, Lemley moved to Los Angeles to pursue a career in film, working in production and music videos before joining Mel Gibson's Icon Entertainment in 1992.

=== Icon Productions ===
At Icon, he worked on various films including Maverick, Immortal Beloved, Anna Karenina, Payback, 187, and served as executive producer on the Vietnam War drama We Were Soldiers. He also produced several television projects, including The Three Stooges for ABC and Invincible for TBS. In 2001 at the age of 36, Lemley was promoted to the position of CEO at Icon Entertainment International, based in London.

=== Independent producing career ===
After eleven years with Icon Productions, Lemley realized he wanted to work on projects on his own and left the company to start an independent producing career. "I’d met a lot of people, so I started working on projects that were close to me," he said of his decision to move on.

For his first independent production, in 2002, Lemley teamed up with Ridley and Tony Scott to executive produce the medieval romance Tristan & Isolde, which starred James Franco and was directed by Kevin Reynolds. It was released in 2006 to mediocre reviews and had lackluster box office performance. In 2004, he partnered with successful horror producer Bonnie Curtis to executive produce the Wes Craven thriller Red Eye which was released in 2005 and starred Rachel McAdams and Cillian Murphy best known for playing the villain Scarecrow in Batman Begins. The film was a modest success and would be a precursor Wanted.

=== Success with Wanted to present ===
In 2005, Lemley partnered with acclaimed Russian director Timur Bekmambetov to produce the hit action thriller Wanted (starring Angelina Jolie and James McAvoy). The film was released in 2008 to solid reviews and would go on to gross $341 million worldwide. Jolie declined to return for a sequel, which has been in development since 2008. On the subject of Wanted 2, Lemley gave an interview with MTV in 2011, exclaiming he would like to see the film move forward with or without Jolie's participation. The sequel never moved into production. In 2024, co-writer Michael Brandt said that creative differences with Bekmambetov over the film's direction had stalled the project and that its momentum had been lost. In June 2025, co-writer Derek Haas said a completed script still existed, but Universal had not given the sequel a green light.

Apart from producing Blockbusters, Lemley also executive produced the critically acclaimed French language drama The Diving Bell and the Butterfly based on the life of Elle magazine editor Jean-Dominique Bauby. The film was praised worldwide and maintains a solid 94% Fresh rating out of 142 possible reviews on Rotten Tomatoes. It was also nominated for 4 Academy Awards including Best Director for Julian Schnabel.

Following the success of Wanted, Lemley would again work with director Timur Bekmambetov on the post-apocalyptic animated feature 9, directed by Shane Acker. The film was co-produced with Bekmambetov and Tim Burton and garnered the producing team a nomination for 'Outstanding Producer of Animated Theatrical Motion Pictures' for the 2010 Producers Guild Awards.

Lemley again re-teamed with Timur Bekmambetov and Tim Burton to produce Abraham Lincoln: Vampire Hunter, released by Twentieth Century Fox on June 22, 2012, and based on the best-seller of the same name. While the film underperformed domestically, the film was a huge hit in countries like Bekmambetov's Russia and went on to be profitable overall. Lemley also has multiple projects in development including Wanted 2, Moby Dick, and a science fiction project called Forever to be directed by Gareth Edwards of Godzilla fame.

== Personal life ==
Lemley earned a B.A. in marketing from the University of Idaho, College of Business and Economics in 1988. While in attendance at the University of Idaho, he was a member of the secret letter fraternity Delta Tau Delta.

He is a member of the Producers Guild of America, Directors Guild of America and the Screen Actors Guild. He remains an active member of his alma mater, serving on the advisory board for the University of Idaho, College of Business and Economics where he also spoke as commencement speaker in the Spring of 2013. Along with frequent collaborator Timur Bekmambetov, Lemley is a founding member and contributor to The World Building Institute at the USC School of Cinematic Arts.

He met French actress Sophie Marceau while on the set of Anna Karenina in 1996, where Marceau played the eponymous role. They have a daughter, Juliette, born in 2002.

== Filmography ==
=== Films ===
- Abraham Lincoln: Vampire Hunter (2012) (producer)
- 9 (2009) (producer)
- Wanted (2008) (producer)
- The Diving Bell and the Butterfly (2007) (executive producer)
- Tristan & Isolde (2006) (executive producer)
- Red Eye (2005) (executive producer)
- We Were Soldiers (2002) (executive producer)
- Anna Karenina (1997) (associate producer)
- Payback (1999) (unit production manager)
- 187 (1997) (unit production manager)
- Immortal Beloved (1994) (production manager)
- Maverick (1994) (production manager: second unit; production supervisor)
- Airborne (1993) (production supervisor)

=== Television ===
- Invincible (2001) (producer)
- The Three Stooges (2000) (producer)

=== Music videos ===
- Abraham Lincoln: Vampire Hunter - Music Trailer featuring "POWERLESS" by Linkin Park (2012) (producer)

=== Actor ===
- Red Eye ... Man on Fishing Boat (2005)

=== Special thanks ===
- The Chumscrubber (2005)

=== As himself ===
- 9: The Long and the Short of It (2009)
- 9: 9: U-Control Picture in Picture (2009)
- HBO First Look: Abraham Lincoln: Vampire Hunter (2012)
