= Lemley-Wood-Sayer House =

Historic house in West Virginia, United States

- U.S. National Register of Historic Places
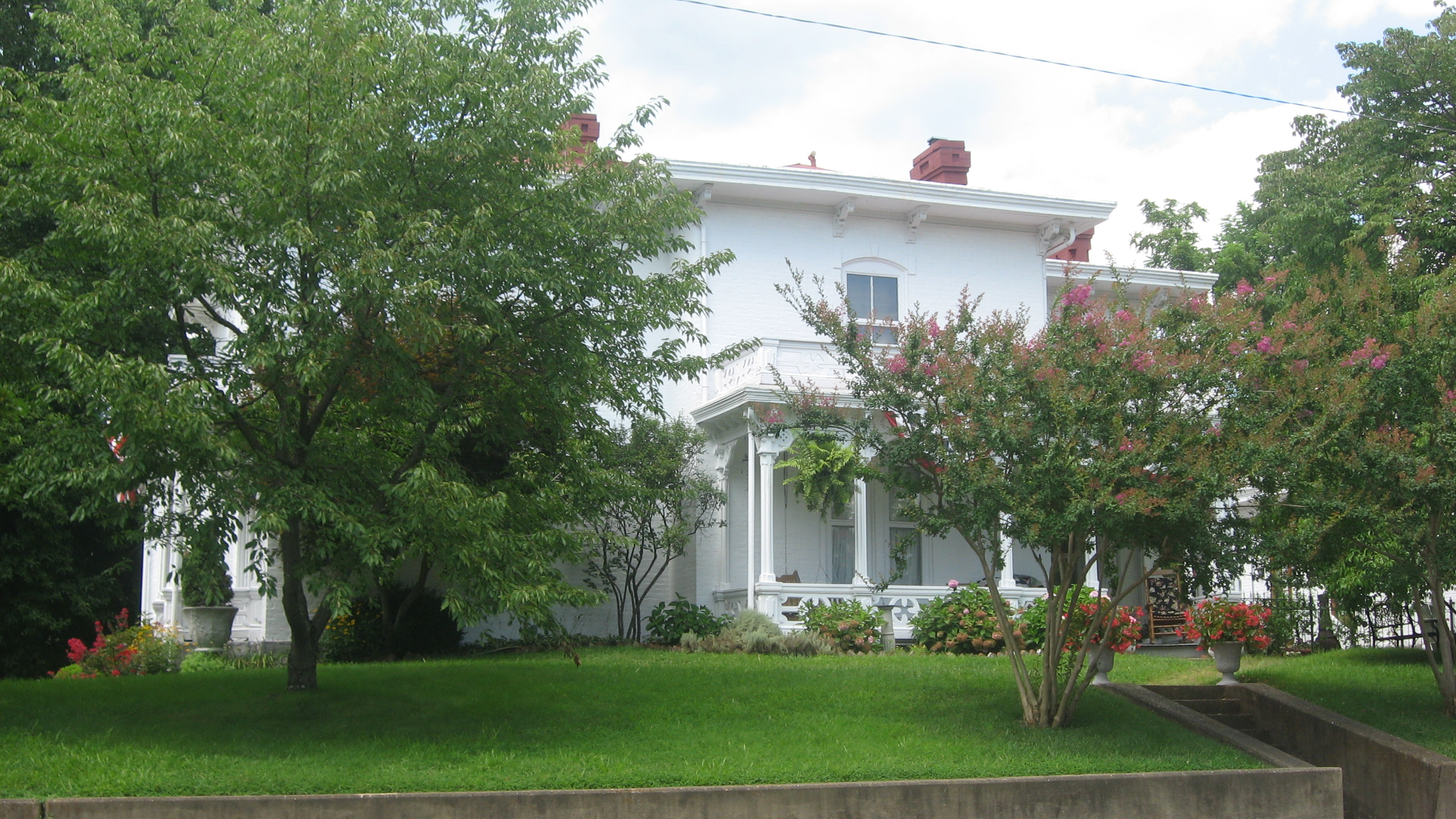
- Front of the house

- Location within West Virginia Location within the United States
- Location: 301 Walnut St., Ravenswood, West Virginia
- Coordinates: 38°56′55″N 81°45′37″W
- Area: 0.8 acres (0.32 ha)
- Built: 1871
- Architect: Brown, Tanzy; Pruder, William
- Architectural style: Italianate
- NRHP reference No.: 85003409
- Added to NRHP: October 30, 1985

Lemley-Wood-Sayer House is a historic home located at Ravenswood, Jackson County, West Virginia. It was built in 1871, and is a two-story, cruciform plan, Italianate style dwelling. It is constructed of brick and sits on a stone foundation. It features a wraparound porch supported by seven columns that are heavy with ornamental bracketing, or gingerbreading.

It was listed on the National Register of Historic Places in 1985.
