= Connected Places Catapult =

R&D agency of the United Kingdom government

The Connected Places Catapult is an innovation agency for cities, transport and place leadership. It is one of several Catapult centres.

== History ==
The organisation was formerly known as the Future Cities Catapult and also the Transport Systems Catapult, which were joined together on 1 April 2019. It works with Innovate UK, in Swindon (Wiltshire). A Deep Academic Alliance agreement was signed with UK universities in July 2018.

=== Future Cities Catapult ===
The Future Cities Catapult opened in London in 2013, to develop smart cities. Its first chairman was Sir David King, a professor of physical chemistry who was previously the government's Chief Scientific Adviser.

=== Transport Systems Catapult ===
The Transport Systems Catapult opened in June 2014 in Milton Keynes, Buckinghamshire, directly west of Witan Gate House. The TSC worked with Wayra UK.

== Projects ==
The organisation researches intelligent transportation systems and automated driving systems.

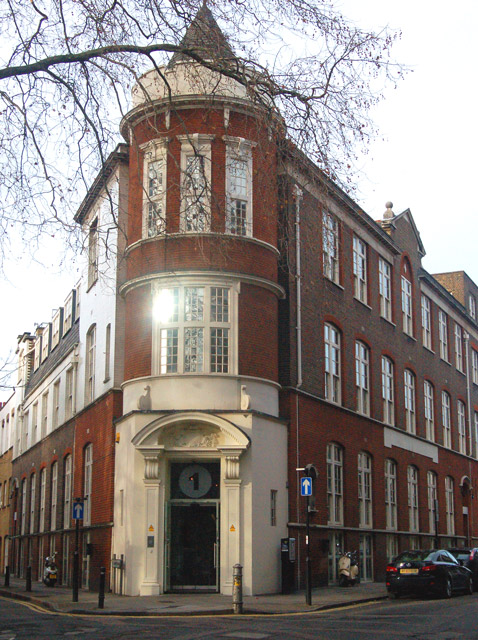
The London head office in February 2010
