= Jack Lemley =

American engineering project manager (1935–2021)

Jack Lemley CBE
- Born: Jack Kenneth Lemley; January 2, 1935; Coeur d'Alene, Idaho, U.S.
- Died: November 29, 2021 (aged 86); Boise, Idaho, U.S.
- Occupation(s): Architect and engineering project manager
- Known for: Channel Tunnel; King Khalid Military City

Jack Kenneth Lemley CBE (January 2, 1935 – November 29, 2021) was an American architect and engineering manager who led delivery of large infrastructure projects across the globe. His projects included the Channel Tunnel between England and France, the King Khalid Military City in Saudi Arabia, and a water tunnel in New York. He was also leading the delivery of the infrastructure facilities for 2012 London Olympics before he resigned citing interference in 2006.

Lemley was made an honorary Commander of the Order of the British Empire for his work on the Channel Tunnel by in 1996.

== Early life ==
Lemley was born in Coeur d'Alene, Idaho, on January 2, 1935. His mother was a homemaker while his father was employed with a power company. He graduated from the University of Idaho, in 1960 with an architecture degree.

== Career ==
Lemley started his career with construction firm Guy F. Atkinson Construction as an engineer. He later went on to work with American engineering company Morrison-Knudsen and later with American equipment manufacturer Blount His early projects included the Interstate 5 project in Seattle, and other projects in New York. One of his first major projects was construction of the King Khalid Military City in Saudi Arabia in the late 1970s and early 1980s.

In 1989, Lemley joined the TransManche Link, a consortium of British and French construction companies that was tasked with building the 31-mile Channel Tunnel, an undersea tunnel linking France and Britain. At the time that he had joined the project, the project was facing significant time delays and cost overruns. The task itself of connecting the two countries under the English Channel was a complex one. Leading the project, he focused on reducing the time delays and had to negotiate with Eurotunnel to agree on who would bear the additional costs. The construction of the tunnel was completed in 1994. He was made an honorary Commander of the Order of the British Empire for his work on the Channel Tunnel by Queen Elizabeth II in 1996. At the time that he took over the project, he noted that while the French side of the project was well-managed, the British side did not have common management systems and had a poor understanding of the tunneling methodologies. To solve the financial challenges, he had reached out to Margaret Thatcher's government to make a call to her Japanese counterpart to request the Japanese banks (who held more than 30% of the project financing debt) to renegotiate the terms of lending. Reflecting on his time on the project, he would later say, "I was really a king in charge of that whole project." He was later credited by journalists such as John Sowell and Sven Berg of the Idaho Statesman as having rescued the Channel Tunnel project.

Lemley was hired in 2005 to lead the development of facilities for the 2012 London Olympics and was made the chairman of the Olympic Delivery Authority. However, he resigned in 2006 citing political interference and other administrative actions that would not allow him to deliver within costs and on time. Talking about his resignation he would go on to say, "I went there to build things, not to sit and talk about it. So I felt it best to leave the post and come home."

Some of the other projects led by Lemley included New York's water tunnel, which was earlier plagued with cost overruns and time delays, and the Holland Tunnel. He worked in and led projects across 65 countries including Papua New Guinea, Colombia, Nepal, and Zimbabwe during his over fifty-year-long career. In 2011, the Idaho Technology Council named Lemley to their Hall of Fame. He retired in 2012 with his last engagement being an assignment with the Istanbul Metro. Per his own admission he flew over seven million miles (almost 300 times around the globe) through his career. (Note: Earth's circumference is 24,901 miles.)

Lemley also served as the CEO of American Ecology (now US Ecology), a radioactive and hazardous waste disposal company, between 1995 and 2002. His actions at the company included moving its headquarters from Houston to Boise.

== Personal life ==
Lemley married his wife Pamela (née Hroza) after a previous marriage ended in divorce. He had three children. In the late 1990s, Lemley bought a sloop, a single-masted sailboat named Coeur de Lion (transl. Heart of a Lion) and went on a sailing trip around the world only to realize en route that he did not know much about sailing. With things falling apart and co-passengers getting sick, he fired the captain and discontinued the trip, though the boat did complete its trip. He would admit later that "I bit off more than I could chew, but I had too much ego into it to give it up." His son Jim Lemley is an American film and television producer based in Paris.

Lemley died on November 29, 2021, in Boise, Idaho, at the age of 86.
