= London Legacy Development Corporation =

Development corporation in London, England

- Abbreviation: LLDC
- Formation: 2012
- Type: Mayoral development corporation
- Headquarters: London
- Location: Olympic Park
- Chairman: Lord Hendy of Richmond Hill
- Chief executive: Lyn Garner
- Parent organisation: Greater London Authority
- Website: www.queenelizabetholympicpark.co.uk

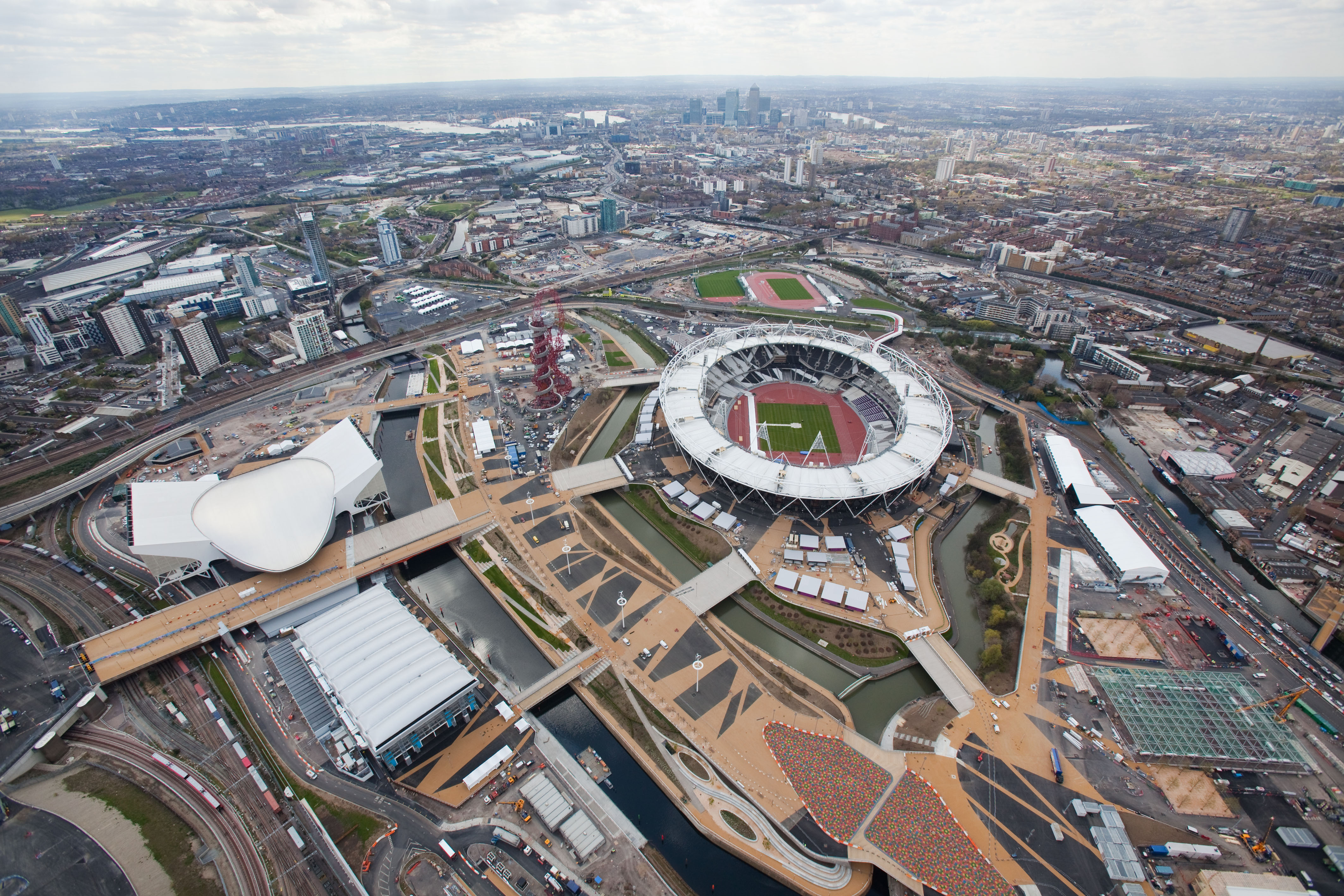
Olympic Park, London

The London Legacy Development Corporation (LLDC) is an organisation established in 2012, replacing the Olympic Park Legacy Company and the planning powers of the Olympic Delivery Authority. It was formed as a mayoral development corporation under the powers of the Localism Act 2011. The mayoral development area covered by the development corporation is the Olympic Park and surrounding areas.

== History ==
The corporation was established in 2012 with the objective of establishing the Queen Elizabeth Olympic Park as a new visitor destination.

In November 2016, London Mayor Sadiq Khan ordered an investigation into the rising costs for the London Stadium, which the LLDC partly owns. The investigation found that (i) capital costs will rise from a budgeted £190 million to £323 million (ii) running costs will rise from a budgeted breakeven to a loss of £10 million per annum.

== Leadership roles ==
The following have been appointed chair of the corporation: Daniel Moylan in February 2012, Boris Johnson in September 2012, David Edmonds in September 2015, Sir Peter Hendy in July 2017, and Suki Kalirai in August 2024.

The following have been appointed CEO of the corporation: Dennis Hone in September 2012, David Goldstone in 2015, Lyn Garner in December 2017, and Shazia Hussain in September 2024.

== Publications ==
In 2023, the LLDC published Creating Places that Work for Women and Girls, a handbook for local authorities, designers and developers. This was dedicated to Pam Alexander.
