= Legacy of the 2012 Summer Olympics =

Impact of multi-sport event in London

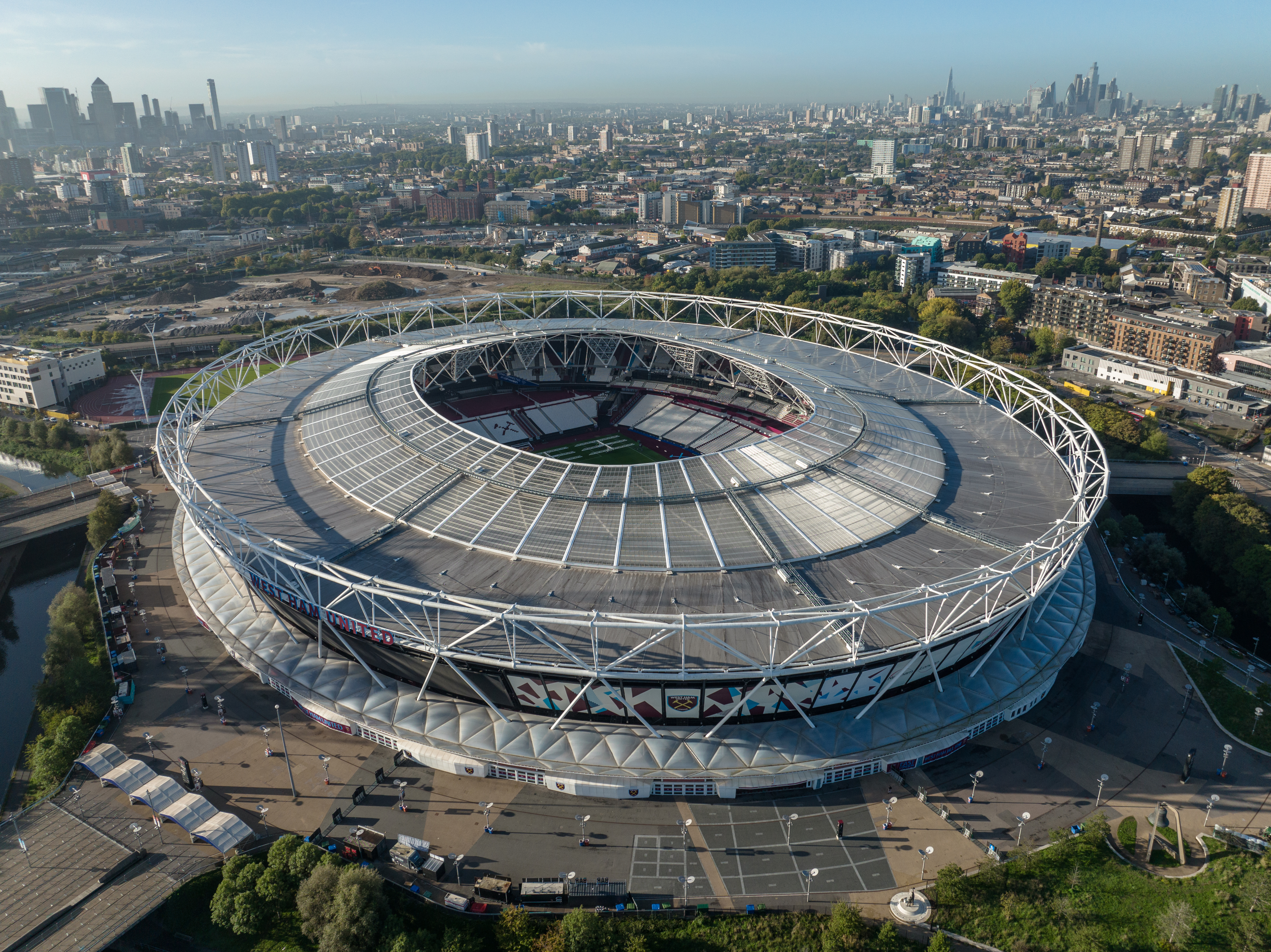
London Olympic Stadium. Following the Games, it was renovated for multi-purpose use for sport and music concerts.

The 2012 Summer Olympics in London had lasting impact on the city and its development. It is variously described as:

- economic – supporting new jobs and skills, encouraging trade, inward investment and tourism
- sporting – continuing elite success, development of more sports facilities and encouraging participation in schools sports and wider
- social and volunteering – inspiring others to volunteer and encouraging social change
- regeneration – reuse of venues, new homes, improved transportation, in East London and at other sites across the UK.

The 2012 legacy is coordinated by the UK Government who appointed Lord Sebastian Coe as the London 2012 legacy ambassador in August 2012.

Examples of the 2012 legacy benefits and results include:

- learning – shared knowledge and lessons learned from the construction of the Olympic Park and preparing and staging the Games
- economic – 2012 apprenticeships in broadcasting companies including the BBC and ITV
- regeneration – the re-opening of the Olympic Park as the Queen Elizabeth Olympic Park in July 2013
- tourism – the Games' long term benefits on London's and Britain's tourism industry

== Bid Pledges ==
The London bid for the 2012 Summer Olympic and Paralympic Games included bid chairman Lord Coe placing a pledge to use the events to inspire two million people to take up sport and physical activity at the heart of the bid. Legacy includes sporting, economic, cultural, and environmental benefits, and aims to ensure that no "white elephants" were created by the 2012 Summer Olympics and 2012 Summer Paralympics. The London Legacy Development Corporation is a mayoral development corporation responsible for the Olympic Park area.

== Construction Phase – The Big Build ==
The Olympic Delivery Authority stated that legacy use and community regeneration were "locked-in" to the planning and designing of Olympic and Paralympic venues and infrastructure, and cited the Olympic Park Aquatics Centre and Olympic and Paralympic sailing facilities in Weymouth as examples showing "a clear focus on sporting, economic, social, and environmental legacy".

== Legacy plans ==
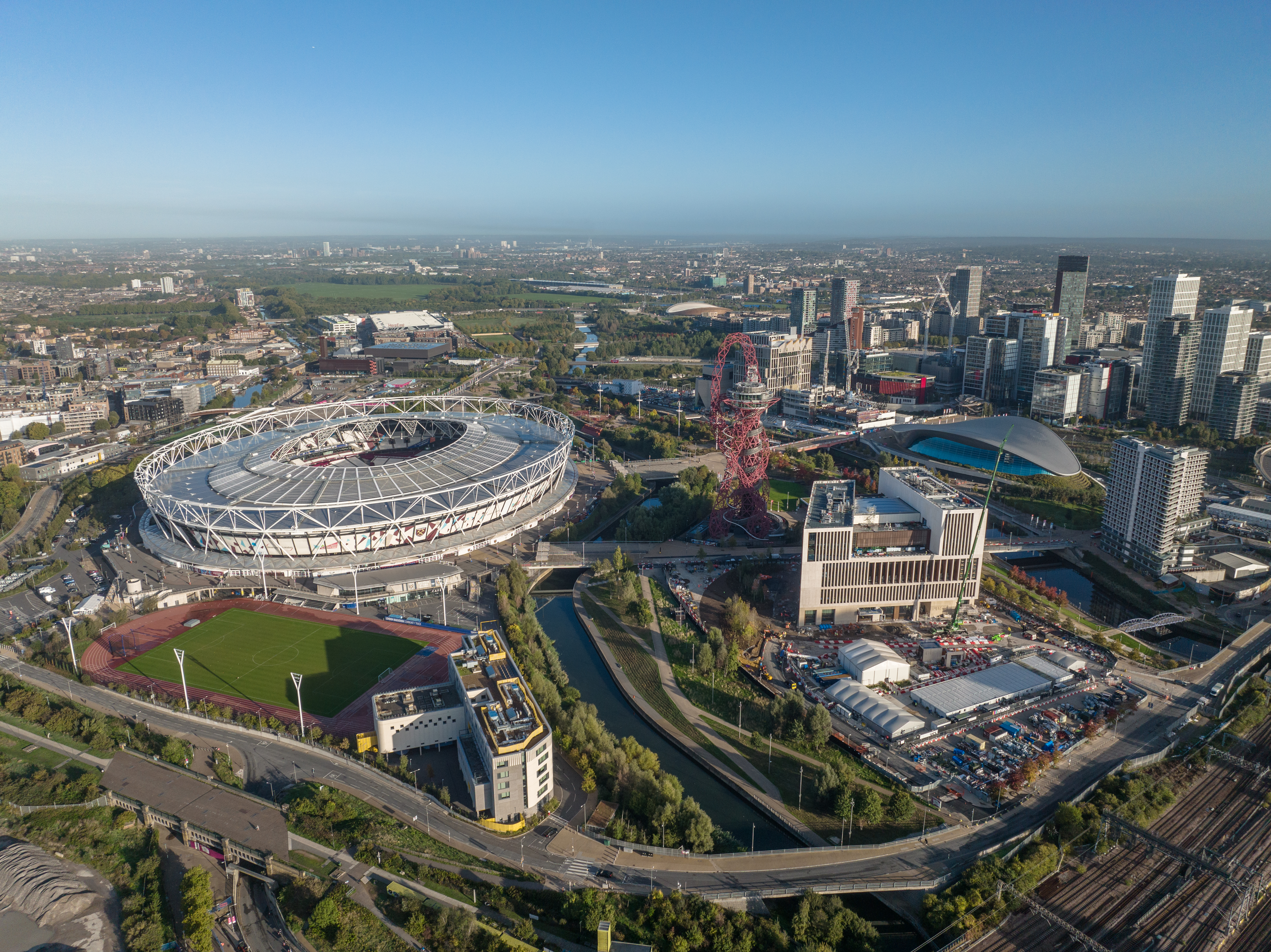
The Queen Elizabeth Olympic Park is now a widely used popular sporting complex and public park, a legacy of the games.

Since the London 2012 Paralympic Games finished on 9 September 2012 the UK Government has unveiled an updated Legacy Plan. Its main points include:

- increased funding for elite sport
- investment to turn the Olympic site into the Queen Elizabeth Olympic Park
- 20 major sporting events to UK by 2019, with more bids in progress
- £1bn investment over the next five years in the Youth Sport Strategy, linking schools with sports clubs and encouraging sporting habits for life
- introduction of the School Games programme to boost schools sport and county sport festivals
- continued funding for International Inspiration, the UK's international sports development programme

There have been several previous legacy plans. These include:

=== Legacy Plan 2010 ===
In December 2010, the Government published a new Legacy plan, which set out the legacy vision for the 2012 Olympic Games and Paralympic Games, and the detailed plans underpinning it. It identified four areas to focus on: harnessing the UK's passion for sport to increase grassroots participation, particularly by young people, and to encourage the whole population to be more physically active; exploiting to the full the opportunities for economic growth offered by hosting the Games; promoting community engagement and achieving participation across all groups in society through the Games; and ensuring that the Olympic Park can be developed after the Games as one of the principal drivers of regeneration in East London.

=== Six borough plans 2009 ===
The six London boroughs hosting the Games – Barking and Dagenham, Greenwich, Hackney, Newham, Tower Hamlets and Waltham Forest – published plans for legacy in 2009. This was outlined in the Strategic Regeneration Framework which included the objective that by 2030, the communities hosting the Games would have the same social and economic life chances as at least the London average. This is the principle of Convergence and guides its joint working on legacy.

=== Legacy Action Plan 2008 ===
A Legacy Action Plan to implement legacy promises was published on 6 June 2008. With comments that the legacy has been published several years earlier than previous Olympics and critics claiming the plan lacks the detail needed to implement an effective legacy. The GLA published a legacy commitments document in 2007.

=== Legacy Plan 2007 ===
The government published its legacy plans via the Department for Culture, Media and Sport's Legacy Promises document, published in 2007. The five promises were:

- Make the UK a world-leading sporting nation
- Transform the heart of the East End of London
- Inspire a generation of young people to take part in local volunteering, cultural, and physical activity
- Make the Olympic Park a blueprint for sustainable living
- Demonstrate the UK is a creative, inclusive, and welcoming place to live in, visit, and for business

=== Strategic Regeneration Framework ===
The Strategic Regeneration Framework and Convergence make real the promise in the original bid document that "By staging the Games in this part of the city, the most enduring legacy of the Olympics will be the regeneration of an entire community for the direct benefit of everyone who lives there". The principle of Convergence is included in the Mayor of London's spatial development strategy, known as The London Plan 2011.

=== Proven legacy ===
The Japanese style 'Olympic Javelin' bullet trains used to ferry spectators at London 2012 began to run on 28 July 2012 and were still running as of 2023, serving more destinations. Some station upgrades also occurred.

Sport Relief occurred at the Olympic Park in 2013, 2014, 2015 and 2016.

When concert promoters Live Nation won the right to stage shows at the stadium and in the surrounding park during January, 2013. The site of the former Riverbank Arena slated to be the stage for Hard Rock Calling, Wireless and Electric Daisy Carnival festivals in 2013. The Lee Valley Hockey Centre was borne from a revamp of the Olympic Legacy Hockey Facility and is the home ground of Wapping Hockey Club.

== Legacy bodies ==
The London Legacy Development Corporation is responsible for planning for, and delivering, the future development of the Olympic Park. It replaced the Olympic Park Legacy Company which had been set up in 2009.

Spirit of 2012 is the London 2012 legacy funder. The National Lottery Community Fund founded Spirit in 2013 with a £47m endowment to continue and recreate the spirit of pride, positivity and community that inspired people across the UK during the London 2012 Games.

== Criticisms and concerns ==
Criticism of the London 2012 legacy includes the legacy not meeting its original ambitions with a decrease in 2014/15 in the number of people playing sport for at least half an hour a week of 125,100.

== See also ==
- Legacy Trust UK
- National Centre for Sport and Exercise Medicine
