= Olympic Delivery Authority =

British government agency

Non-departmental public body overview
- Formed: 2006
- Dissolved: 2014
- Headquarters: One Churchill Place, Canary Wharf, London
- Employees: 66 (2013/14)
- Minister responsible: Jeremy Hunt, Secretary of State for Culture, Media and Sport
- Non-departmental public body executive: Sir John Armitt, Chairman
- Parent Non-departmental public body: Department for Culture, Media and Sport
- Website: www.gov.uk/oda

The Olympic Delivery Authority (ODA) was a non-departmental public body of the Department for Culture, Media and Sport, responsible for ensuring the delivery of venues, infrastructure and legacy for the 2012 Summer Olympic and Paralympic Games in London. Together with the London Organising Committee of the Olympic and Paralympic Games (LOCOG), the ODA was one of the two main agencies that organised the London Olympic Games.

The authority was established by the London Olympic Games and Paralympic Games Act 2006. In advance of the formal establishment of the ODA, the London Development Agency (LDA) and Transport for London (TfL) were asked to undertake the development work necessary for the Olympic Park and the transport infrastructure which will serve the Games, and to build up an interim team.

The ODA was co-located alongside LOCOG at One Churchill Place in Canary Wharf. The ODA appointed a delivery company, CLM, to manage the delivery of the Olympic Park and its associated infrastructure. CLM was a consortium of CH2M Hill, Laing O'Rourke and Mace. CLM's organisation included teams responsible for the design and construction of the venues, structures bridges and highways as well as logistics and security.

== History ==
The authority was established by the London Olympic Games and Paralympic Games Act 2006. Prior to the act receiving royal assent, Jack Lemley was appointed as chairman in 2005, but resigned on 18 October 2006. Lemley had run the Anglo-French group that designed and built the £8 billion Channel Tunnel.

Lemley's tenure as chairman of the ODA and subsequent resignation in October 2006 became surrounded by controversy and recrimination. Originally claiming his resignation was due to pressing commitments in his international construction business, Lemley International, he later asserted to the Idaho Statesman that his departure seemed necessary because political infighting and the unwillingness of government ministers to face up to construction challenges threatened the project and his reputation. He insisted that the Culture Secretary Tessa Jowell and Mayor of London Ken Livingstone had ignored warnings that the project budget was spiraling out of control, refused to accept that chemical contamination of Olympic sites presented unexpectedly large challenges, hid additional expenses such as VAT costs, and refused to confront the reality that the Olympics may have to be scaled back to keep within costs.

Lemley was criticised by the government for breaking confidentiality, and Ken Livingstone suggested he had been treated more than fairly when asked to resign, being allowed a dignified departure due to his past services to the nation on the Channel Tunnel project and a generous compensation package.

In May 2007, Culture Secretary, Tessa Jowell, announced John Armitt's appointment as Chairman, the appointment commenced on 1 September 2007, with Acting Chairman Sir Roy McNulty resuming his post of Deputy Chairman.

In February 2011, the Director of Finance, Dennis Hone succeeded David Higgins as Chief Executive. He left the position in April 2013 to become Chief Executive of the London Legacy Development Corporation, being replaced by Gerry Murphy.

In 2012, the Authority won New Civil Engineer 40th Anniversary Award - Impact on Society at the British Construction Industry Awards.

Between 2009 and 2012, the Olympic Park Legacy Company (OPLC) worked with the ODA regarding the future legacy state of the Olympic Park - such as new housing and integrating the park into the community. The OPLC was replaced by a Mayoral development corporation, the London Legacy Development Corporation (LLDC) in 2012, which also took over the planning powers of the ODA.

The ODA was dissolved on 2 December 2014.

== Responsibilities ==
The ODA was responsible for the delivery of the infrastructure required for the Olympic and Paralympic Games. Following the conclusion of the events, the authority took on the role of adapting the Olympic Park with the construction of new facilities and venues, as well as the removal of the temporary venues used during the Games. The ODA was also the local planning authority for the area between 2006 and 2012, with these powers passing to the LLDC.

== Finance ==
The ODA's original budget was £2.375 billion, provided by a public sector funding package agreed between Government and the Mayor of London in 2003. However, in October 2006, Culture Secretary Tessa Jowell announced that this could rise to over £4 billion. In March 2007 she announced a new funding package for the ODA, increasing its budget to £9.3 billion.

The government had expected to take advantage of the UK's increasing property prices, and developers, including Lendlease and Igloo, were expected to fund construction of parts of the Olympic village and Media Centre. However, as a result of the recession and fall in property prices since 2008, additional funding was requested from a contingency fund set up by the government.

== See also ==
- 2012 Summer Olympic development
- International Olympic Committee
- Legacy Trust UK
