= Venues of the 2012 Summer Olympics and Paralympics =

The 2012 Summer Olympics and Paralympics venues were mostly located in the host city of London, though some other events required facilities located elsewhere. Venues outside London (and England) included Hampden Park in Glasgow, Scotland, and the Millennium Stadium in Cardiff, Wales. Between the successful bid and the Olympics and Paralympics themselves, several details and venues changed.

== Sporting venues ==
The 2012 Games used a mixture of newly built venues, existing facilities and temporary facilities, some of them in well known locations such as Hyde Park and Horse Guards Parade. Some of the facilities are being reused in their Olympic form, while others were constructed so that they could either be reduced in size or moved elsewhere in the UK. The plans were intended to contribute to the regeneration of Stratford in east London which is the site of the Olympic Park and of the neighbouring Lower Lea Valley.

The venues within Greater London were divided into three zones: the Olympic Zone, the River Zone and the Central Zone. In addition to these were venues that, by necessity, are outside the boundaries of Greater London.

=== Naming ===
The IOC has a number of major blue-chip sponsors for the Olympics, who are entitled to have their name exclusively associated with the event. As a consequence, any other company that provided sponsorship was not permitted to use its name or branding during the games, which includes as part of the name of any venue. Thus, three Olympic venues were temporarily renamed for the duration of the Games:

- The O2 Arena – North Greenwich Arena
- Sports Direct Arena – St James' Park
- The Ricoh Arena – City of Coventry Stadium

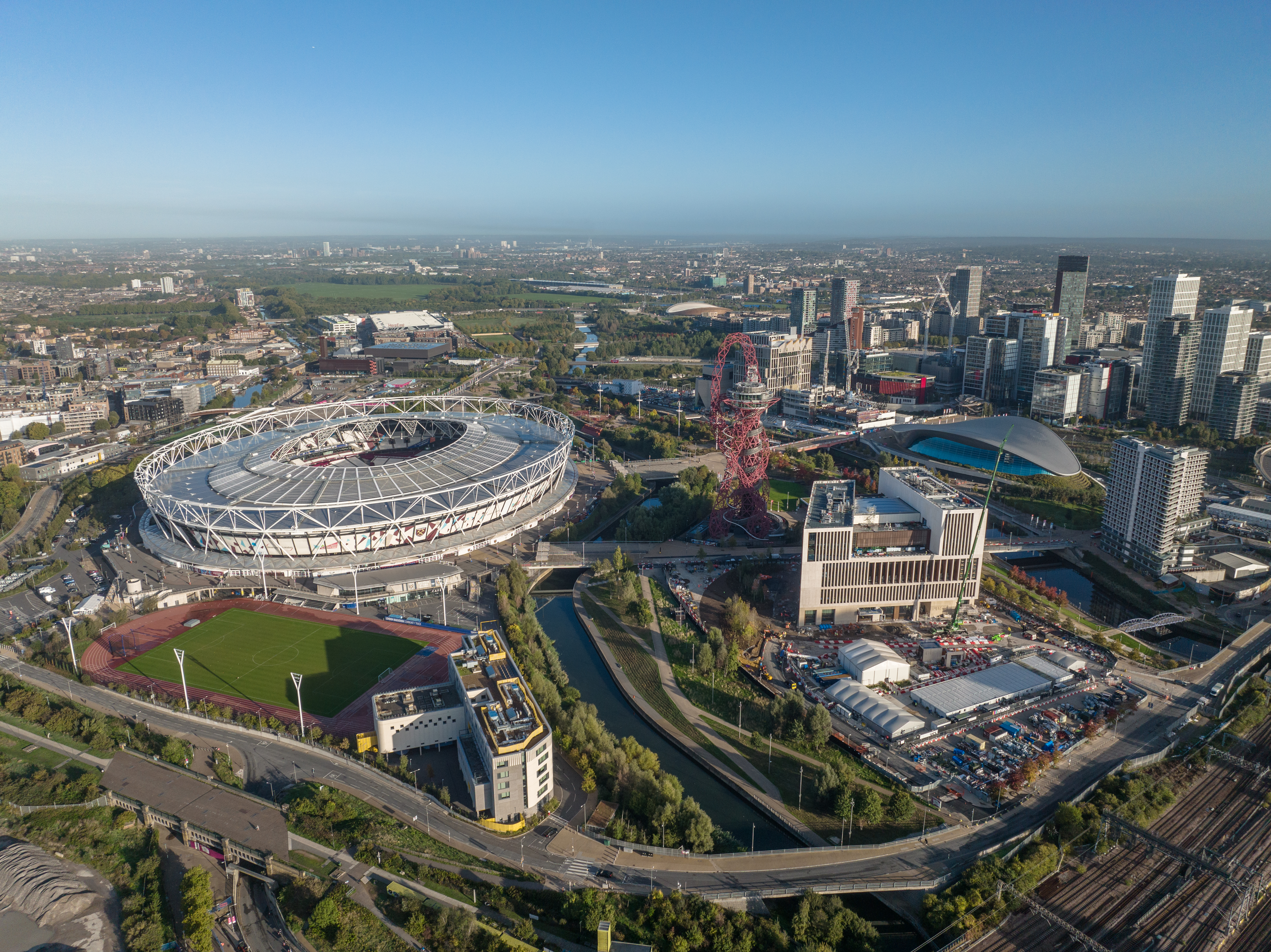
Queen Elizabeth Olympic Park

=== Olympic Park Zone ===
The Olympic Zone encompassed all of the facilities within the 500 acres (2 km^{2}) Olympic Park in Stratford. This park was developed on existing waste and industrial land, and is seven minutes by Olympic Javelin train from central London. The park contained in the following below:

| Venue | Permanent/ Temporary | Sports | | Capacity | Ref. |
| Venue | Permanent/ Temporary | Olympics | Paralympics | Capacity | Ref. |
|---|---|---|---|---|---|
| Aquatics Centre | Permanent | Diving, Modern Pentathlon (swimming), Swimming, Synchronized Swimming | Swimming | 17,500 | |
| Basketball Arena | Temporary | Basketball, Handball (medal round) | Wheelchair Rugby, Wheelchair Basketball | 12,000 | |
| BMX Track | Permanent^{1} | Cycling (BMX) | — | 6,000 | |
| Eton Manor | Permanent | — | Wheelchair Tennis | 10,500 | |
| Copper Box | Permanent | Handball, Modern Pentathlon (fencing) | Goalball | 7,000 | |
| Velodrome | Permanent^{1} | Cycling (track) | Cycling (track) | 6,000 | |
| Riverbank Arena | Temporary^{2} | Field Hockey | Football seven-a-side, Football five-a-side | 16,000 | |
| Olympic Stadium | Permanent | Athletics, Ceremonies (opening/closing) | Athletics, Ceremonies (opening/closing) | 80,000 | |
| Water Polo Arena | Temporary | Water polo | — | 5,000 | |

1: - As part of Lee Valley VeloPark
2: - Hockey facilities moved to Eton Manor

- The Olympic Village, with accommodation for all athletes and team officials (some 17,320 beds in total). After the games the village will become a district of the Stratford City development, a multibillion-pound development project on the former railway goods yard to the east of the Olympic Park. (Accredited technical officials – referees, umpires, etc. – are housed in hotel space in London Docklands).
- The Olympic Press and Broadcast Centres.
- Park Live In the heart of the Queen Elizabeth Olympic Park, Park Live was a live site accommodating over 15,000 spectators and park visitors. With two giant screens broadcasting live games coverage and a presentation stage hosting athlete and guest interviews, it was the fifth largest venue on the London 2012 Olympic Park and the first time a live site of this type had ever been created inside an Olympic Park.

The original plan called for the construction of five new indoor arenas, four in the Olympic Park, and one in the River Zone (see below). In order to save money this was reduced to two. The existing venues at Earls Court and Wembley Arena were added to the plans, and various sports were shuffled around to make this possible.

The construction of the Olympic Park itself commenced in 2006, with Murphy Group awarded the contract to remove the powerlines which crossed the site and move these into a tunnel to be dug beneath the site. Civil engineering companies Morrisons and Nuttalls were appointed to undertake the demolition and land remediation works, under the project management of WS Atkins. The pace of this speeded up with the closure of the roads crossing the Olympic Park in June 2007. The construction phase of the Olympic Park was managed by CLM, a consortium comprising CH2M Hill, Laing O'Rourke and Mace. This consortium is officially titled Delivery Partner, ODA. The earliest construction of venues commenced in April 2008 with the start of the main build on the Olympic Stadium by McAlpine, with the nearby energy centre to be constructed by EDF Energy. Work on the Aquatics Centre began later the same year. During the construction phase the workforce on-site is expected to peak at 9,000 operatives. Accidents during construction of the venues resulted in no deaths - the only time this has happened in the history of Olympic construction.

=== River Zone ===
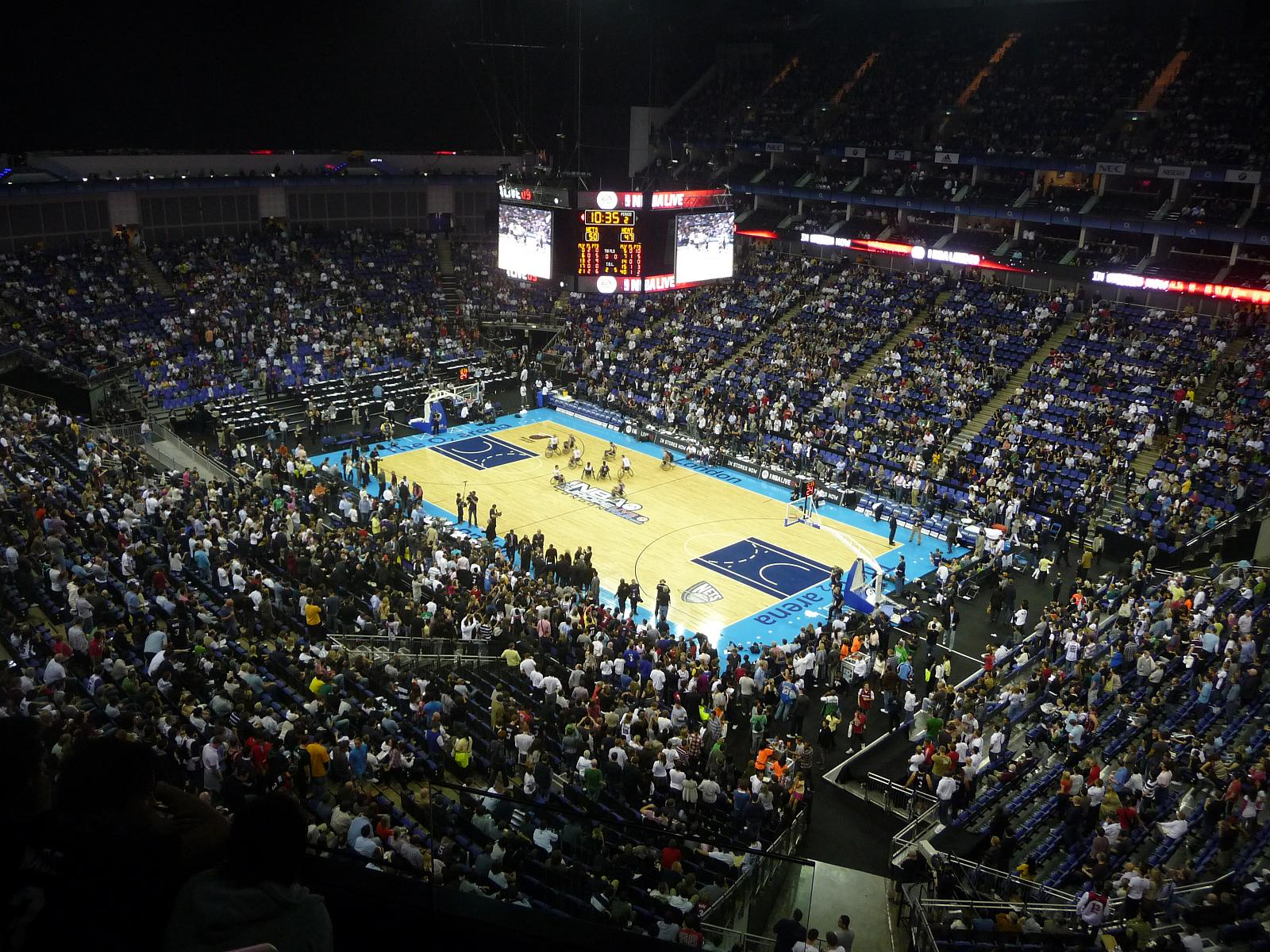
The O2 Arena (North Greenwich Arena) was the venue for gymnastics and basketball.

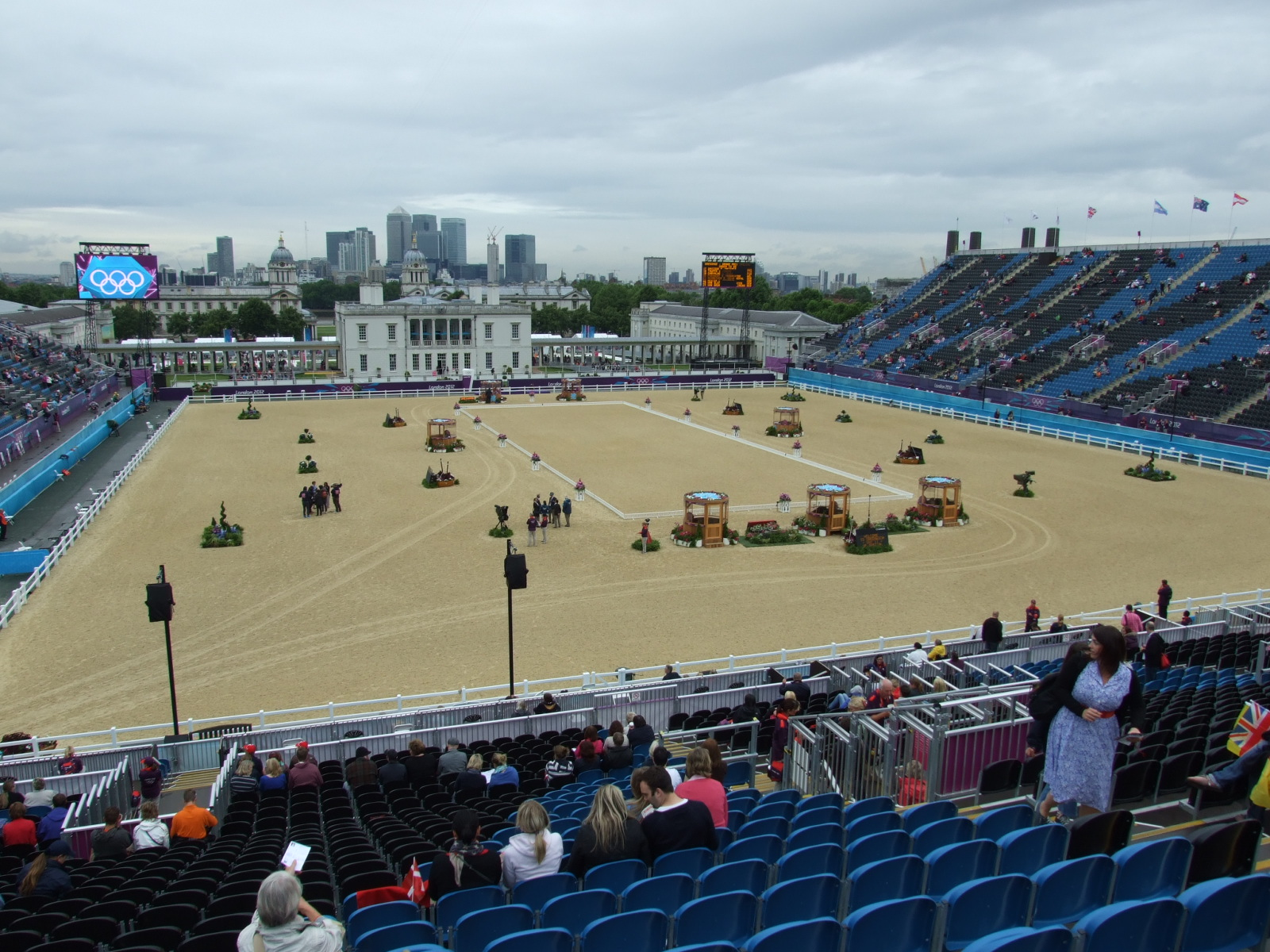
The stadium constructed at Greenwich Park for equestrian events, shown prior to the dressage Grand Prix Special competition.

The River Zone features four main venues in the Thames Gateway area straddling the River Thames:

| Venue | Sports | | Capacity | Ref. |
| Venue | Olympics | Paralympics | Capacity | Ref. |
|---|---|---|---|---|
| ExCeL | Boxing, Fencing, Judo, Table Tennis, Taekwondo, Weightlifting, Wrestling | Boccia, Judo, Powerlifting, Table Tennis, Volleyball (sitting), Wheelchair Fencing | from 5,000 to 10,000 | |
| Greenwich Park | Equestrian, Modern Pentathlon (riding, running, shooting) | Equestrian | 23,000 (OG); 6,000 (PG) | |
| North Greenwich Arena | Basketball (final), Gymnastics (artistic, trampolining) | Wheelchair basketball | 20,000 (OG); 18,000 (PG) | |
| Royal Artillery Barracks | Shooting | Archery, Shooting | 7,500 (OG); 5,000 (PG) | |

In the initial plan for the River Zone, a temporary 6,000 seat capacity facility to be called North Greenwich Arena 2 was to have been built alongside the O2 to host the badminton and rhythmic gymnastics events. However, the cost led to alternatives being suggested, eventually leading to the cancellation of the arena and the transfer of its planned events to Wembley Arena instead.

=== Central Zone ===
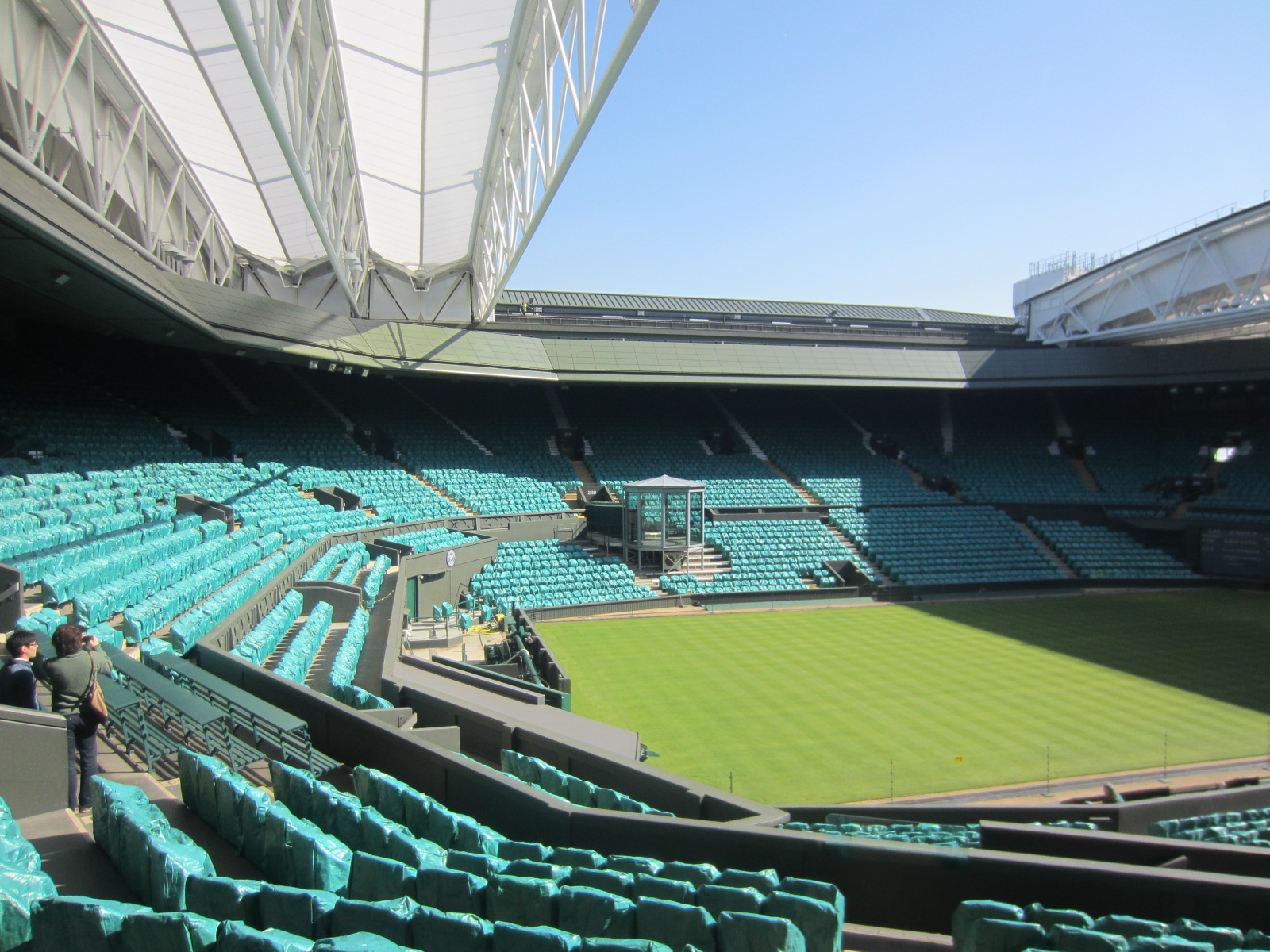
Centre Court at the All England Lawn Tennis and Croquet Club was the venue for tennis

The Central Zone is formed out of all the remaining venues within Greater London. They are quite widely spread across central, west and south London:

| Venue | Sports | | Capacity | Ref. |
| Venue | Olympics | Paralympics | Capacity | Ref. |
|---|---|---|---|---|
| All England Lawn Tennis and Croquet Club | Tennis | — | 30,000 | |
| Earls Court Exhibition Centre | Volleyball (indoor) | — | 15,000 | |
| Horse Guards Parade | Volleyball (beach) | — | 15,000 | |
| Hyde Park | Swimming (marathon), Triathlon | — | 3,000 | |
| Lord's Cricket Ground | Archery | — | 6,500 | |
| Marathon Course | Athletics (marathon and race walk) | Athletics (marathon) | Not listed. | |
| Wembley Arena | Badminton, Gymnastics (rhythmic) | — | 6,000 | |
| Wembley Stadium | Football | — | 90,000 | |

The men's and women's time trials in road cycling took place on specially laid out courses starting and finishing at Hampton Court Palace.

=== Outside Greater London ===
Five of the venues are outside Greater London:

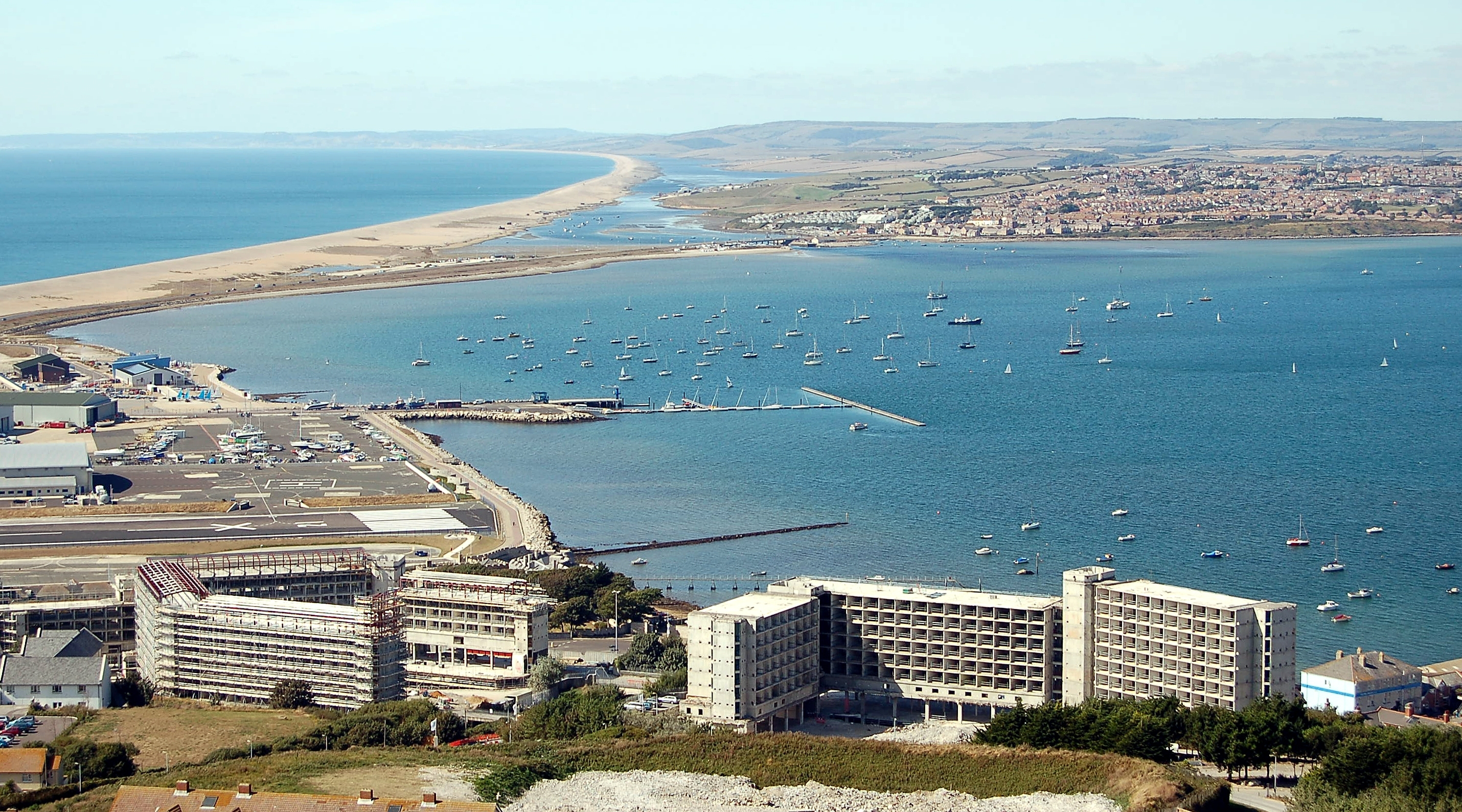
The Weymouth and Portland National Sailing Academy on the Isle of Portland, Dorset hosted the sailing events.

| Venue | Location | Sports | | Capacity | Ref. |
| Venue | Location | Olympics | Paralympics | Capacity | Ref. |
|---|---|---|---|---|---|
| Brands Hatch | Swanley, Kent | — | Cycling (road) | | |
| Dorney Lake | Dorney, Buckinghamshire | Canoeing (sprint), Rowing | Rowing | 30,000 maximum (OG); 6,000 (PG) | |
| Hadleigh Farm | Hadleigh, Essex | Cycling (mountain biking) | — | 20,000 (includes 3,000 seating) | |
| Lee Valley White Water Centre | Waltham Cross, Hertfordshire | Canoeing (slalom) | — | 12,000 maximum | |
| Weymouth and Portland National Sailing Academy | Isle of Portland, Dorset | Sailing | Sailing | 4,600 (OG); 17,400 (PG) | |

=== Football stadiums ===
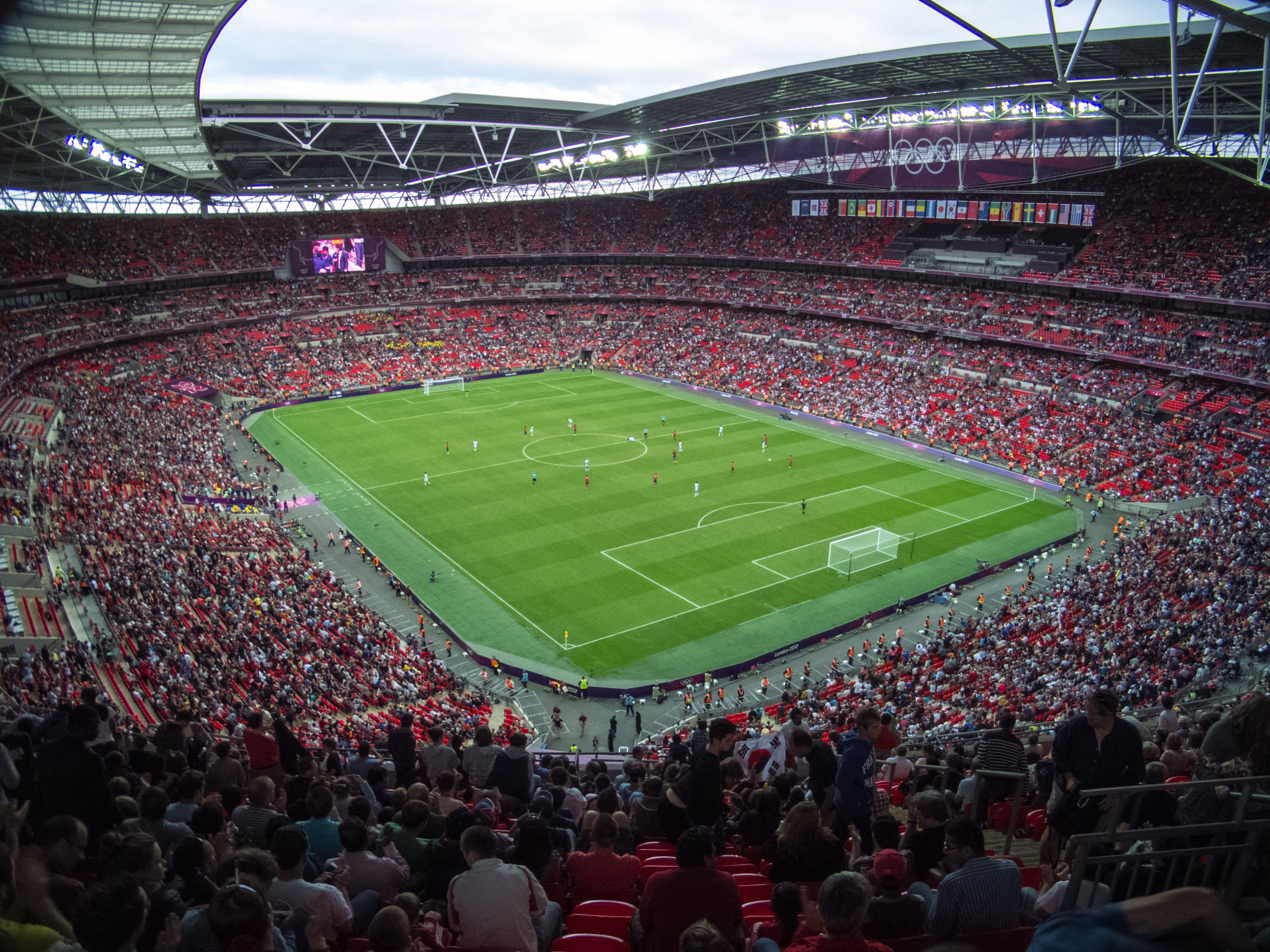
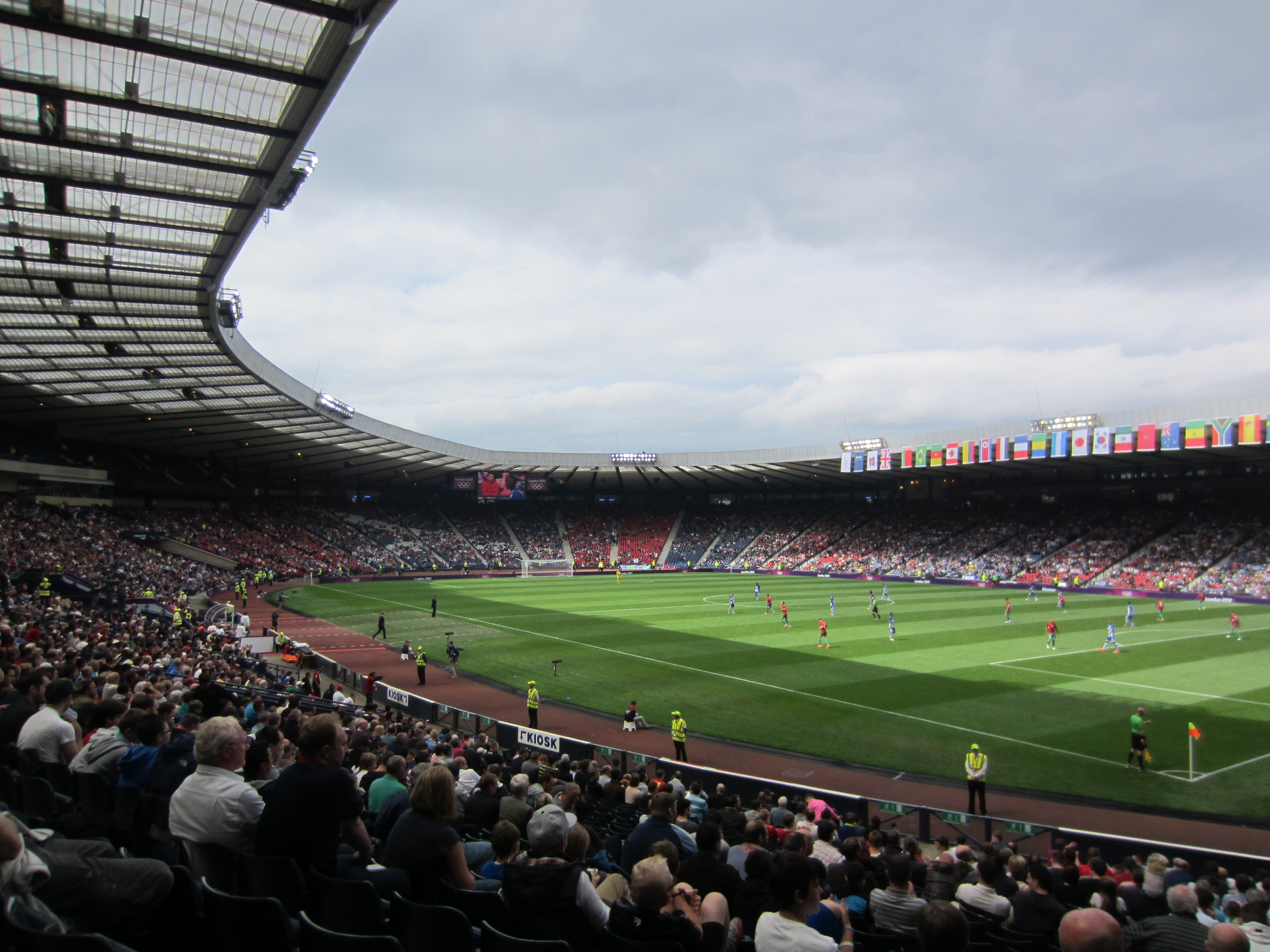
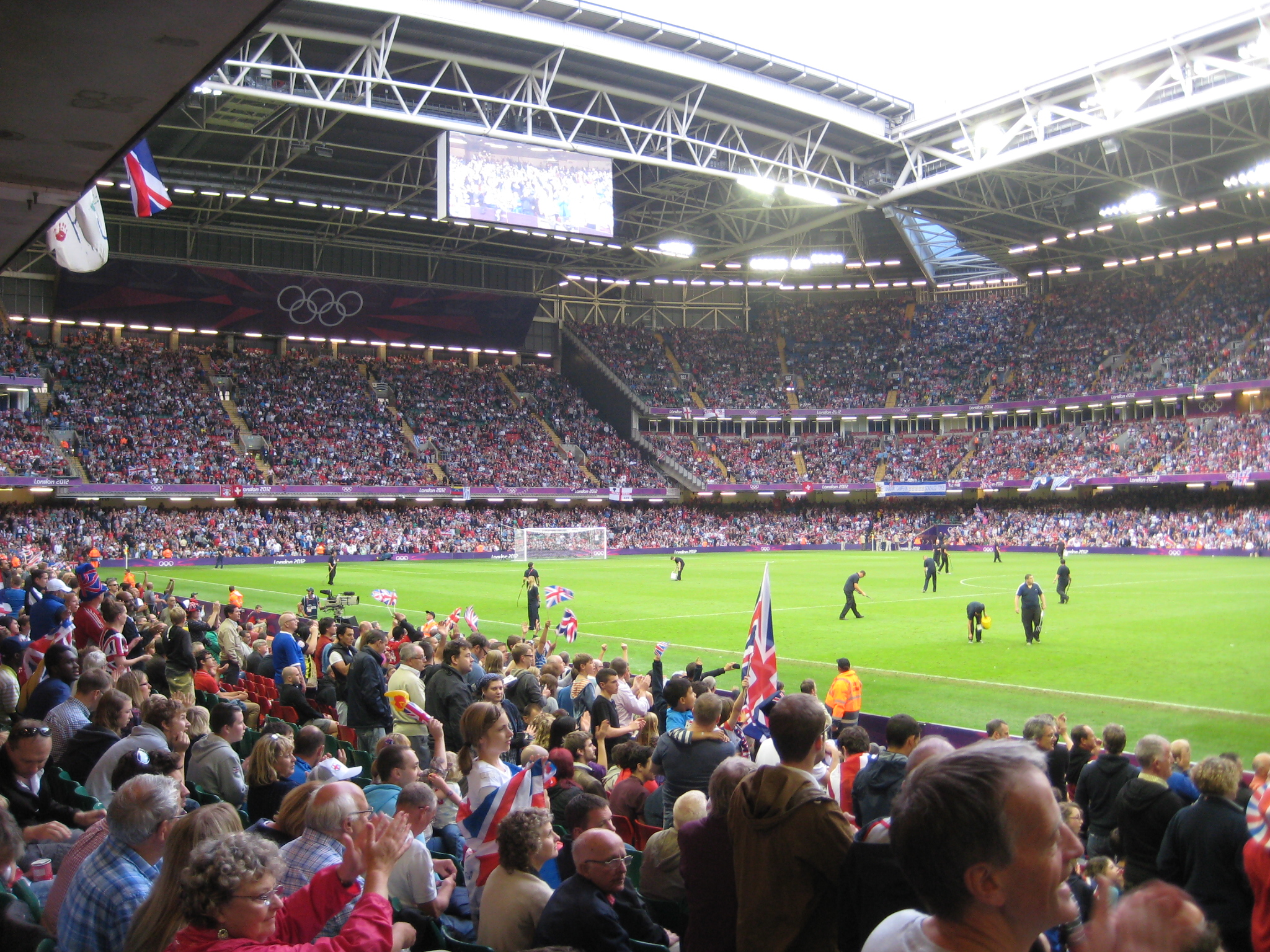
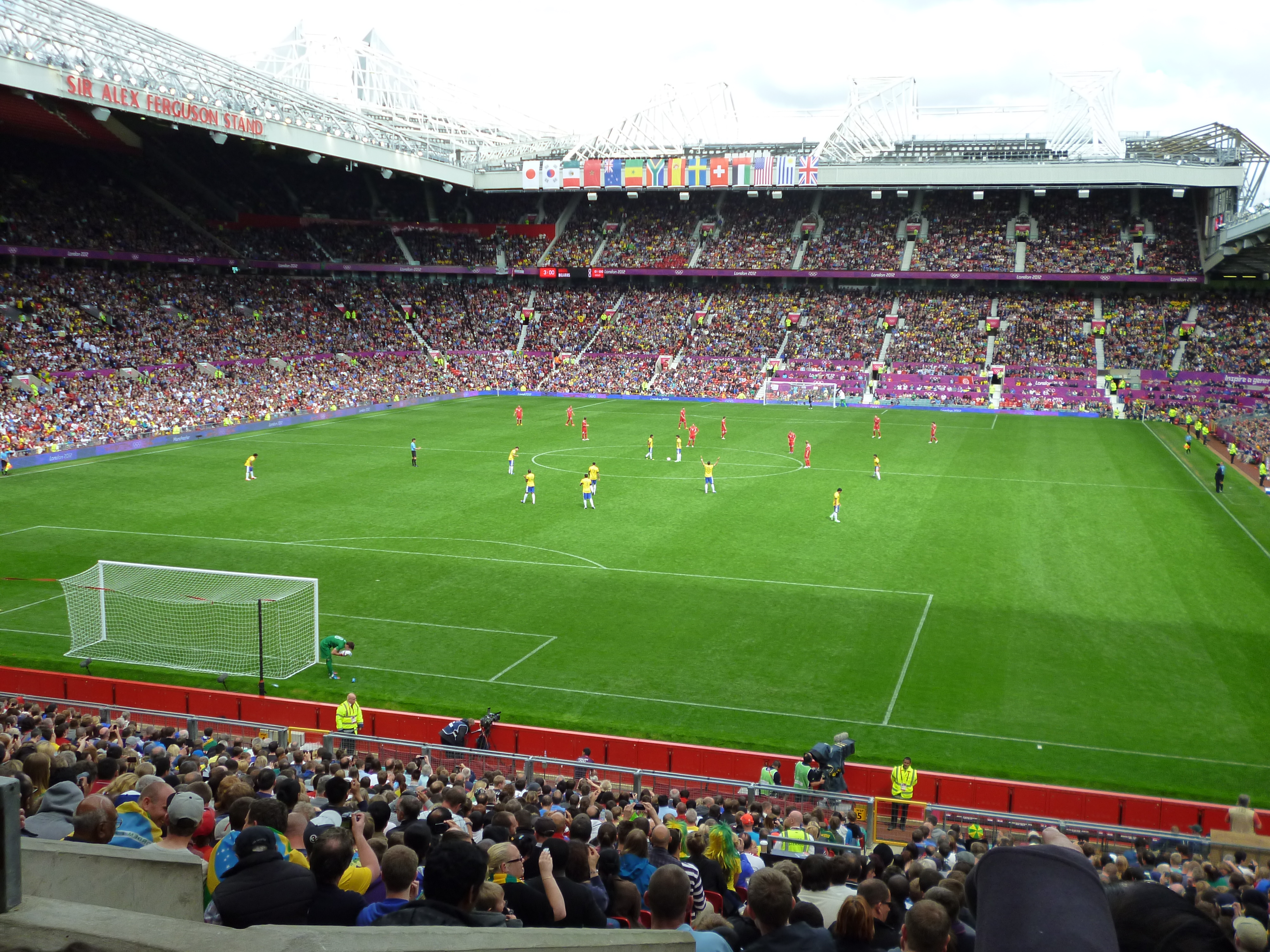
Clockwise from top left: Wembley Stadium, Hampden Park, Old Trafford, and the Millennium Stadium decorated for the Olympic Games.

The earlier stages of the Olympic football competition were played at football stadia around the United Kingdom in addition to Wembley Stadium. Both finals (men's and women's) were held at Wembley Stadium:

| Venues | Location | Capacity | Ref. |
|---|---|---|---|
| City of Coventry Stadium | Coventry, England | 32,500 | |
| Hampden Park | Glasgow, Scotland | 52,000 | |
| Millennium Stadium | Cardiff, Wales | 74,600 | |
| Old Trafford | Manchester, England | 76,000 | |
| St James' Park | Newcastle upon Tyne, England | 52,409 | |
| Wembley Stadium | London, England | 90,000 | |

== Transport and infrastructure ==
Facilities of the 2012 Summer Olympics in the Greater London area. Navigate the map for other facilities.
Facilities of the 2012 Summer Paralympics in the Greater London area. Navigate the map for other facilities.

Public transport, an aspect of the bid which scored poorly in the IOC's initial evaluation, has seen numerous improvements, including the expansion of the East London Line, upgrades to the Docklands Light Railway and the North London Line, and the new high-speed Olympic Javelin service.

It is almost impossible to assess how many of the proposed improvements would have happened in any case. The games were won without a commitment to deliver Crossrail by 2012. This was the largest transport project proposed for London, and it was widely assumed in the early stages of the bidding process that the games could not be won without a guarantee that it would be completed before the games.

During the games, 80% of athletes are within 20 minutes of their events and 97% are within 30 minutes of their events. Together, all the planned National Rail, light rail, and underground services are expected to deliver around 240 trains every hour. Olympic volunteers and staff picked up their uniforms and accreditation at the Uniform Distribution and Accreditation Centre.

== The Olympic and Paralympic village ==
Difficulties experienced by developers Lendlease in raising funds for the village (the single largest project in the 2012 scheme) resulted in the scale of the village being reduced by almost 25%. This was achieved predominantly by providing accommodation for London-based athletes only. Those competing in events outside London were to be housed elsewhere. Following the athletes' experiences in Beijing 2008 (and in particular through comments concerning athletes' welfare by International Olympic Committee President Jacques Rogge) this compromise was to be reconsidered whilst pressure built for the finance deal to be resolved.

== Changes to the original bid ==
Regent's Park was planned to host the softball and baseball events, but the IOC chose not to run those events.

Windsor Park in Belfast, Northern Ireland, was included as a football venue in the IOC questionnaire submitted in 2004, but excluded in the final candidature file.

On 7 June 2006, a revised masterplan for the Olympic Park was announced. The most significant change was the relocation of the volleyball events from a new Olympic Arena to the existing venue of Earls Court, which is several miles to the west. The revision also involved the re-organisation of the park shuffling the basketball, cycling, fencing, tennis, and field hockey venues in addition to the Press and Broadcast Centre. This move was designed to remove the need for the relocation of 80 businesses and to provide a more coherent legacy for the sporting venues.

Another change was the relocation of the badminton and rhythmic gymnastics events to Wembley Arena in north-west London, instead of a proposed new venue near the North Greenwich Arena.

Two venues to be developed outside central London were also relocated from the original bid sites. The Broxbourne canoe venue was marginally re-sited following the discovery (in October 2007) that the proposed Spitalbrook site was contaminated, while in February 2008 the Weald Country Park was deemed insufficiently challenging for elite mountain biking. It was announced in August 2008 that the revised venue would be at Hadleigh Farm, also in Essex.

In August 2009, Villa Park was withdrawn from the list of venues for the football competition, due to uncertainty over Aston Villa's redevelopment plans for the stadium, and was replaced by the City of Coventry Stadium in Coventry.
