= Nigel Dunnett =

British horticulturalist and academic (1963–2026)

Nigel Paul Dunnett (23 January 1963 – 26 April 2026) was a British horticulturalist and academic who was a professor of planting design and urban horticulture at the University of Sheffield. He worked on naturalistic planting design, sustainable urban drainage landscapes, and green infrastructure projects working with landscape architects.

== Life and career ==
Nigel Dunnett was born in Ipswich on 23 January 1963. In 1984, he completed his degree in Botany at the University of Bristol and following the completion of his PhD, joined the Department of Landscape at the University of Sheffield in 1994. He became Professor of Planting Design and Urban Horticulture in 2011. His teaching and research focus on ecological planting design, green roofs, rain gardens, and large-scale urban meadows.

He founded the social enterprise Pictorial Meadows in 1998. It developed a seed-based approach to colourful, low-maintenance urban meadows that has since been widely adopted in public landscapes.

Dunnett collaborated widely with other designers and ecologists, notably James Hitchmough, and contributed to projects in the United Kingdom and elsewhere.

Dunnett died from cancer on 26 April 2026, at the age of 63.

== Works ==
=== Olympic Gold Meadows ===
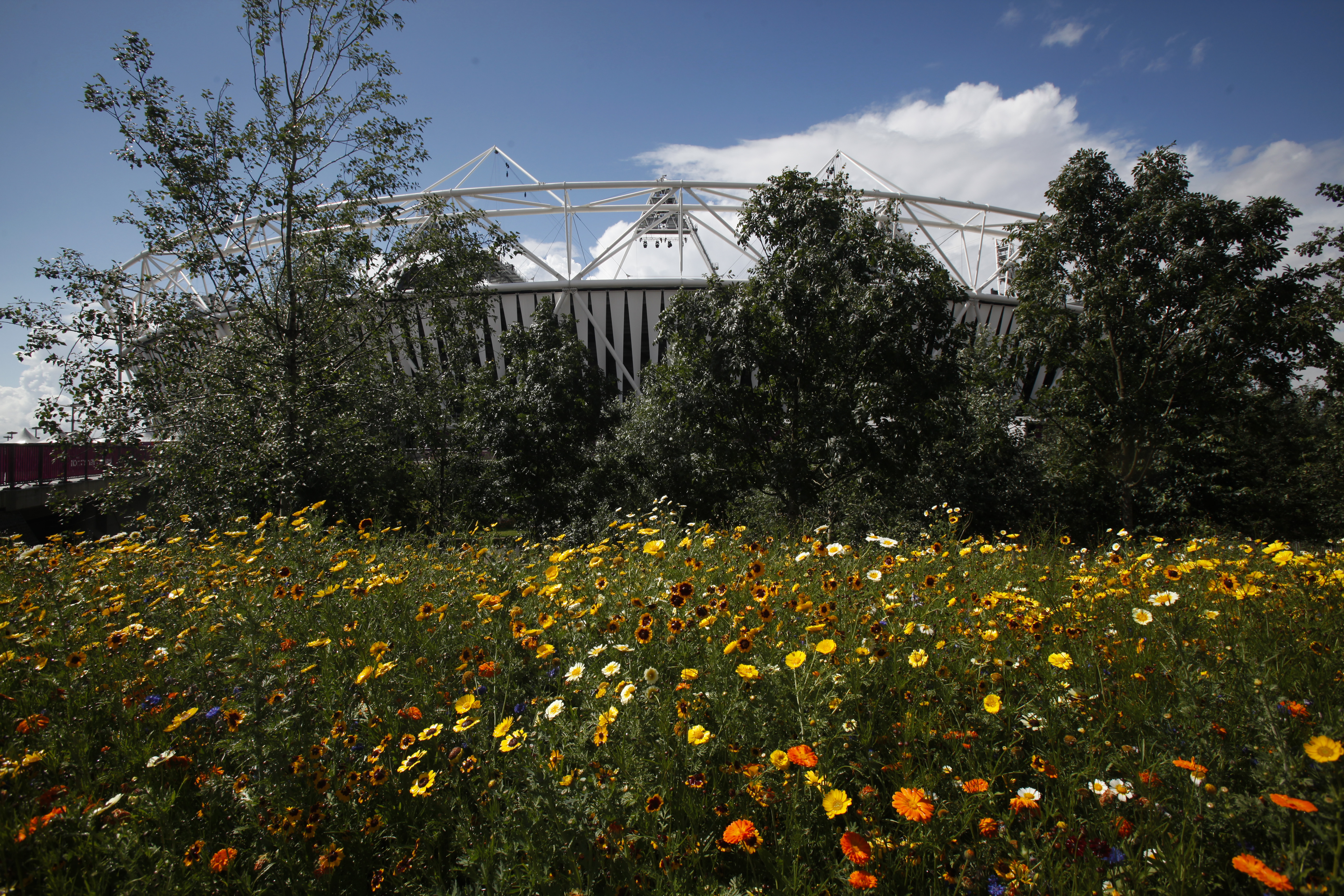
Wildflower meadows at the Queen Elizabeth Olympic Park in August 2012, co-designed by Dunnett with James Hitchmough and Sarah Price

At the Queen Elizabeth Olympic Park in London (2012), Dunnett co-designed large wildflower meadows and naturalistic planting schemes with James Hitchmough and garden designer Sarah Price. The Guardian noted their role in transforming perceptions of ecological planting in public landscapes and described them as "a blaze of colour and biodiversity, timed to perfection for the opening ceremony".

The project received international coverage; TIME magazine emphasised visual impact, positive public response and ecological significance. Sonia van Gilder Cooke stated, "Olympic spectators can't stop taking pictures of them. Passersby point when they see them. They've even generated fan mail. They're British wildflowers, and they are earning golden reviews at Olympic Park."

The scheme has since been credited with influencing approaches to urban planting in Britain and elsewhere.

=== Grey to Green Project ===
The Grey to Green EU-funded project in Sheffield (2016–2020) was developed after the city's 2007 floods, converting 1.6 km of former highways into Europe’s largest retrofitted sustainable drainage scheme. The planting design, by Nigel Dunnett working with Zac Tudor of Sheffield City Council and Robert Bray Associates as adviser on the sustainable urban drainage, combines flood mitigation with biodiversity and public realm improvements.

The project was awarded the CIRIA Inaugural Awards overall winner. It was praised as a "national green champion" at the Green Apple Awards and cited by the EU Climate-ADAPT as "a climate adaptation exemplar". and the CEEQUAL's "Most Outstanding Achievement" in 2016.

=== Barbican Estate, Beech Gardens and The High Walk ===
At the Barbican Estate, Beech Gardens and The High Walk in London (2015), he led the redesign of the podium landscapes with the Landscape Agency, introducing climate-resilient planting to address chronic waterproofing and maintenance problems. The scheme has since been recognised with awards from the Landscape Institute for its innovation in planting design.

=== Tower of London Superbloom ===
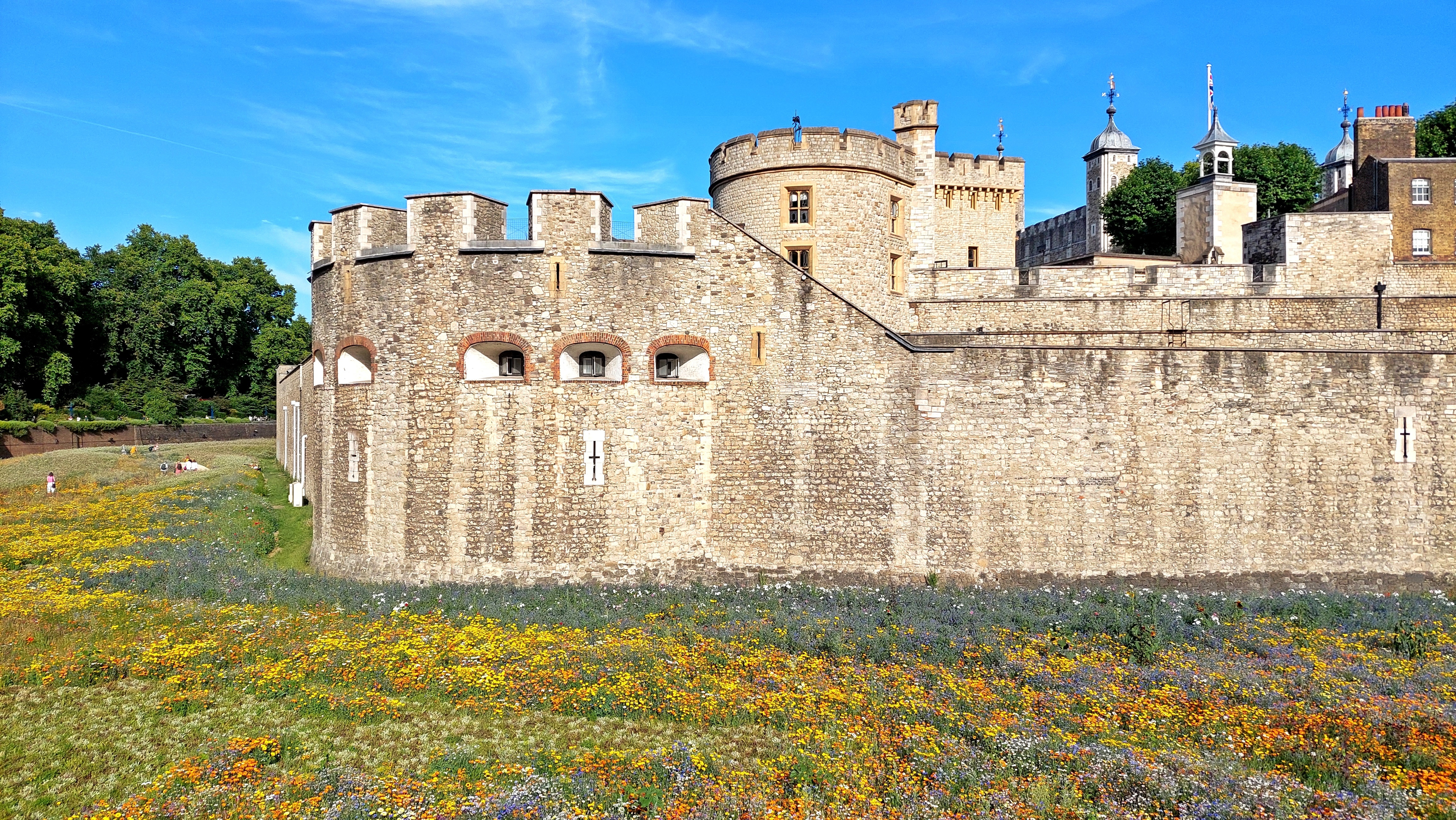
The Superbloom display in the moat of the Tower of London in July 2022, for which Dunnett designed the planting

At the Tower of London Superbloom community project in 2022, Dunnett designed the planting for the moat as part of Elizabeth II's Platinum Jubilee celebrations. Working with Grant Associates for Historic Royal Palaces, the scheme involved sowing about 20 million seeds across 14,000 square metres (150,000 sq ft) to produce seasonal displays that changed in colour and form through the summer. Described as a transformation to "a spectacular river of flowers" filling the moat, it was intended as the first stage in a long-term plan to create a permanent naturalistic landscape in the heart of the City of London.

=== Grosvenor Square ===
At Grosvenor Square in Mayfair, London, Dunnett collaborated on the planting design for a major transformation of the square, which as of May 2026 was due for completion in summer 2026. Working with Tonkin Liu, BDP, Davies White and the Grosvenor Group, the scheme will expand planting areas from about 140 square metres (1,500 sq ft) 8,000 square metres (86,000 sq ft), with over 70,000 plants, 44 new trees and 80,000 bulbs. Grosvenor has described the project as creating "an extraordinary urban garden" designed for climate resilience, stormwater capture, and biodiversity gain.

== Publications ==
- Planting Green Roofs and Living Walls (with Noel Kingsbury, Timber Press, 2004/2008).
- The Dynamic Landscape: Design, Ecology and Management of Naturalistic Urban Planting (with James Hitchmough, Routledge, 2004).
- Rain Gardens: Managing Water Sustainably in the Garden and Designed Landscape (with Andy Clayden, Timber Press, 2007).
- Naturalistic Planting Design: The Essential Guide (Filbert Press, 2019).

== Research papers ==
- Nagase, Ayako; Dunnett, Nigel (30 November 2011). "The relationship between percentage of organic matter in substrate and plant growth in extensive green roofs". Landscape and Urban Planning. 103 (2): 230–236. doi:10.1016/j.landurbplan.2011.07.012. ISSN 0169-2046.
- Hoyle, Helen; Jorgensen, Anna; Warren, Philip; Dunnett, Nigel; Evans, Karl (1 July 2017). ""Not in their front yard" The opportunities and challenges of introducing perennial urban meadows: A local authority stakeholder perspective". Urban Forestry & Urban Greening. 25: 139–149. doi:10.1016/j.ufug.2017.05.009. ISSN 1618-8667.
- Southon, Georgina E; Jorgensen, Anna; Dunnett, Nigel; Hoyle, Helen; Evans, Karl L (1 April 2018). "Perceived species-richness in urban green spaces: Cues, accuracy and well-being impacts". Landscape and Urban Planning. 172: 1–10. doi:10.1016/j.landurbplan.2017.12.002. ISSN 0169-2046.
- Yuan, Jia; Dunnett, Nigel (1 October 2018). "Plant selection for rain gardens: Response to simulated cyclical flooding of 15 perennial species". Urban Forestry & Urban Greening. 35: 57–65. doi:10.1016/j.ufug.2018.08.005. ISSN 1618-8667.
- Hoyle, Helen; Norton, Briony; Dunnett, Nigel; Richards, J. Paul; Russell, Jean M.; Warren, Philip (1 December 2018). "Plant species or flower colour diversity? Identifying the drivers of public and invertebrate response to designed annual meadows". Landscape and Urban Planning. 180: 103–113. doi:10.1016/j.landurbplan.2018.08.017. ISSN 0169-2046.
- Norton, Briony A.; Bending, Gary D.; Clark, Rachel; Corstanje, Ron; Dunnett, Nigel; Evans, Karl L.; Grafius, Darren R.; Gravestock, Emily; Grice, Samuel M.; Harris, Jim A.; Hilton, Sally; Hoyle, Helen; Lim, Edward; Mercer, Theresa G.; Pawlett, Mark (2019). "Urban meadows as an alternative to short mown grassland: effects of composition and height on biodiversity". Ecological Applications. 29 (6) e01946. doi:10.1002/eap.1946. ISSN 1051-0761. PMC 6851864. PMID 31173423.
- Thuring, Christine E.; Dunnett, Nigel P. (1 May 2019). "Persistence, loss and gain: Characterising mature green roof vegetation by functional composition". Landscape and Urban Planning. 185: 228–236. doi:10.1016/j.landurbplan.2018.10.026. ISSN 0169-2046.

== Awards and accolades ==
- Royal Horticultural Society Chelsea Flower Show medals – including recognition in 2025 for naturalistic planting schemes.
  - 2009 – The Future Nature Garden with Adrian Hallam and Chris Arrowsmith – Silver-Gilt
  - 2011 – RBC New Wild Garden – Silver-Gilt
  - 2012 – RBS Blue Water Garden – Silver-Gilt
  - 2013 – RBC Blue Water Roof Garden – Gold
  - 2017 – Greening Grey Britain Garden (RHS Feature Garden – medal type not specified)
  - 2025 – The Hospitalfield Arts Garden – Silver-Gilt
- Landscape Institute Awards – shortlisted and awarded in several categories across public realm and planting design project for the Barbican Estates.
- Fellow of the Landscape Institute 2020.
- RHS Ambassador in 2023
- Royal Designer of Industry in 2023.
