= LDA Design =

Landscape architecture firm in the UK

LDA Design is a UK-based landscape architecture, urban design, planning, and environmental consultancy. Founded in 1979, the practice is known for its work on major regeneration and infrastructure projects, including the Queen Elizabeth Olympic Park and Battersea Power Station. It employs around 150–200 staff across studios in London, Bristol, Exeter, Manchester, Peterborough, Cambridge, Glasgow, and Oxford.

The practice has won over 100 awards across areas such as urban regeneration, public realm, and public park design. The firm is recognised within the UK landscape architecture profession for its scale of delivery and emphasis on integrating ecological, social, and economic outcomes.

== History ==
The practice was established in 1979, developing a multidisciplinary approach that combines landscape, urban design, and planning.

In 2021, the company became employee-owned through the creation of an Employee Ownership Trust, intended to strengthen its collaborative culture and ensure long-term stability.

== Projects ==
LDA Design is best known for its involvement in several high-profile UK projects, including:

- Queen Elizabeth Olympic Park – landscape and legacy masterplan for the 2012 London Olympics with Hargreaves Associates and Nigel Dunnett.
- Battersea Power Station – public realm and landscape design for the large-scale redevelopment.
- Union Terrace Gardens, Aberdeen – a £28 million city-centre regeneration project.
- Alfred Place Gardens, London– one of the capital's first “green streets”.
- Strand Aldwych, London - major public realm regeneration,

The practice has also delivered regeneration frameworks for Edinburgh, Exeter, London, Oxford, and Cambridge, and contributed to strategic infrastructure and energy projects across the UK.
