= Queen Elizabeth Olympic Park =

Sporting complex in Greater London, England

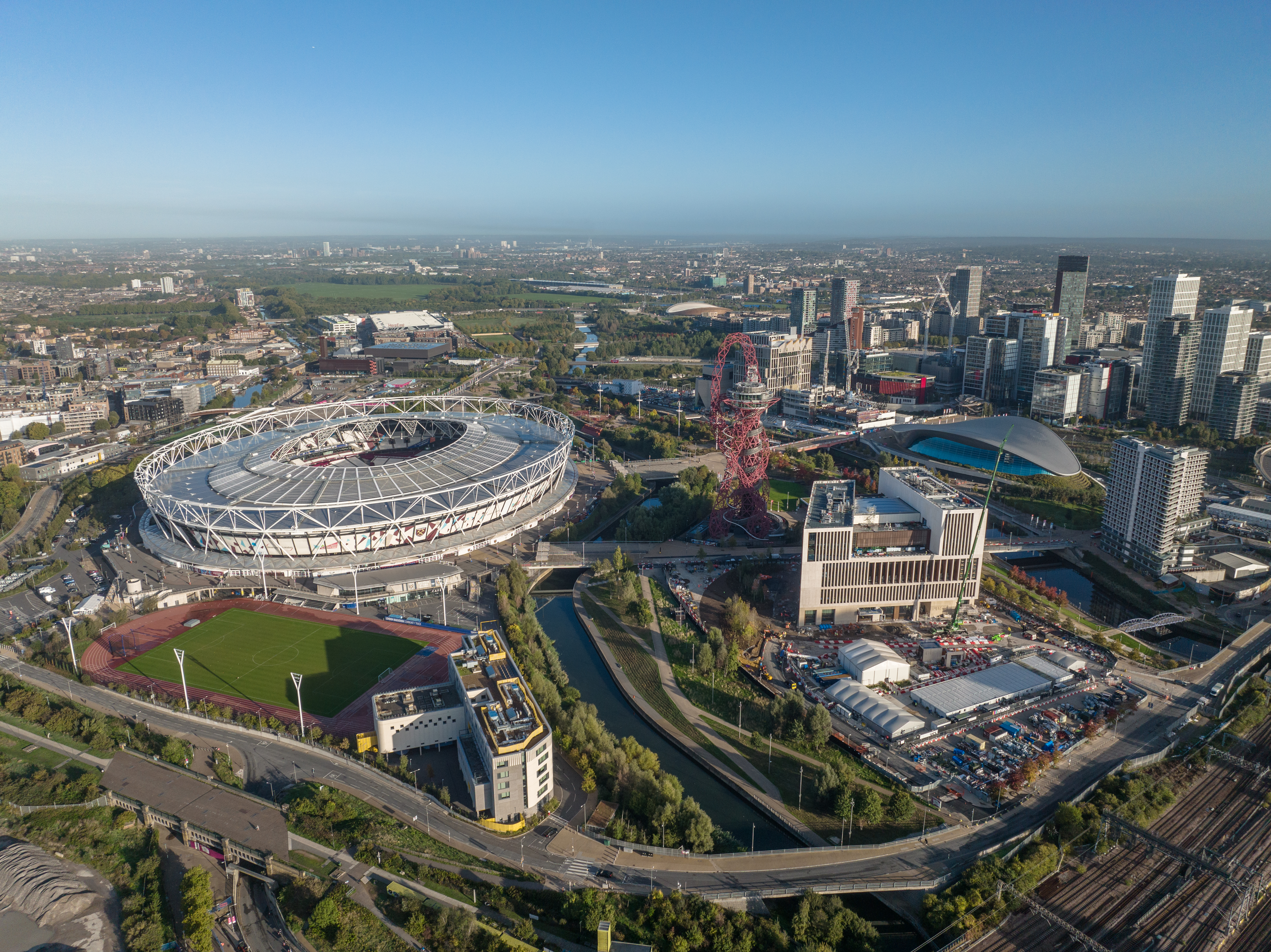
- Aerial view of the park in October 2022

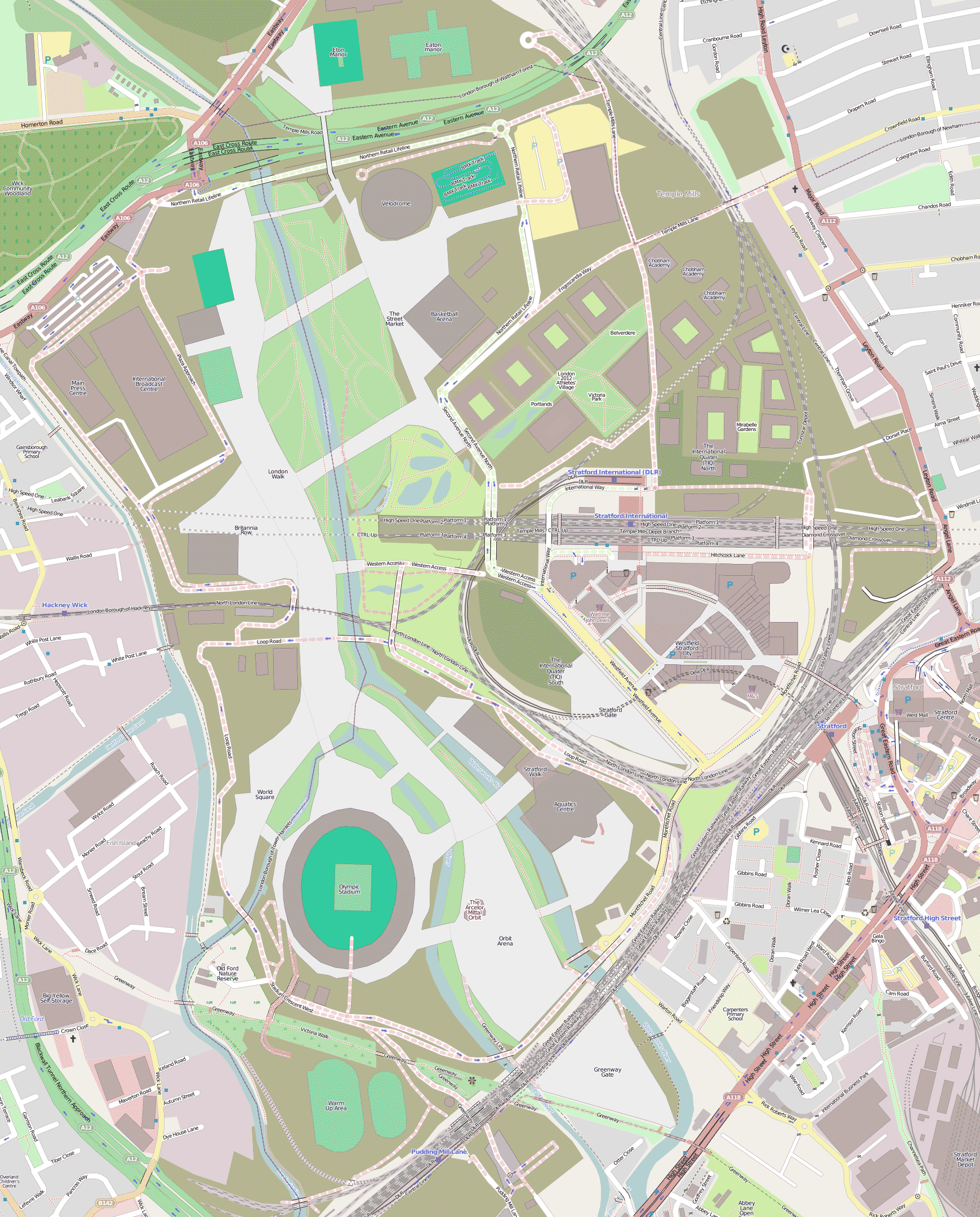
- Map of the park in 2012
- Coordinates: 51.546°N 0.016°W
- Sovereign state: United Kingdom
- Region: Greater London
- Districts: Newham, Tower Hamlets, Waltham Forest, Hackney
- City districts: Stratford, Old Ford, Leyton, Hackney Wick
- Time zone: UTC0 (UTC)
  - Summer (DST): UTC+1 (BST)
- Postcode: E20
- Website: queenelizabetholympicpark.co.uk<

Queen Elizabeth Olympic Park
- Interactive map of Queen Elizabeth Olympic Park
- Full name: Queen Elizabeth Olympic Park
- Former names: Olympic Park (2012 Summer Olympics)
- Operator: London Legacy Development Corporation
- Main venue: London Stadium and London Aquatics Centre; Capacity: 62,500 (regulated capacity); 66,000 (seated capacity) (sports); 80,000 (concerts); 2,500 (Aquatics Centre)
- Facilities: Aquatics Centre; Copper Box Arena; Lee Valley Hockey and Tennis Centre; Lee Valley VeloPark

Construction
- Built: 2008–2011
- Opened: 2012

Queen Elizabeth Olympic Park is a sporting complex and public park in Stratford, Hackney Wick, Leyton and Bow, in east London. It was purpose-built for the 2012 Summer Olympics and Paralympics, situated adjacent to the Stratford City development. It contains the Olympic stadium, now known as the London Stadium, and the Olympic swimming pool together with the athletes' Olympic Village and several other Olympic sporting venues and the London Olympics Media Centre. The park is overlooked by the ArcelorMittal Orbit, an observation tower and Britain's largest piece of public art.

It was simply called The Olympic Park during the Games but was later renamed to commemorate the Diamond Jubilee of Queen Elizabeth II (though it is not an official Royal Park of London). The park occupies an area straddling four east London boroughs; Newham, Tower Hamlets, Hackney and Waltham Forest. Part of the park reopened in July 2013, while a large majority of the rest (including the Aquatics Centre, Velopark and Orbit observation tower) reopened in April 2014.

== Location ==
The site covers parts of Stratford, Bow, Leyton, and Hackney Wick in east London, overlooking the A12 road. The site was previously a mixture of greenfield and brownfield land, including parts of Hackney Marshes.

Royal Mail gave the park and Stratford City the postcode E20, which had previously only appeared in the television soap opera EastEnders for the fictional suburb of Walford.

On 2 August 2011, it was announced the five neighbourhoods of housing and amenities (anti-clockwise from north-east) are:

- Chobham Manor in the London Borough of Newham
- East Wick in the London Borough of Hackney (by Hackney Wick)
- Sweetwater in the London Borough of Tower Hamlets
- Pudding Mill in the London Borough of Newham
- Marshgate Wharf in the London Borough of Newham

These names have relevant history in the area. All four of the East London boroughs covering the park as such have a neighbourhood except for Waltham Forest.

== History ==
=== Design ===
The park was designed by the EDAW Consortium (including EDAW, Allies and Morrison and Buro Happold), working with Arup and WS Atkins. Detailed landscape architecture was by LDA Design in conjunction with Hargreaves Associates. Planting design for the parklands and gardens was developed by Professors Nigel Dunnett and James Hitchmough of the University of Sheffield, together with garden designer Sarah Price, who created large-scale naturalistic and perennial meadow schemes that became a major feature of the park. LDA design contracted Wallace Whittle to carry out various aspects of the M+E Building services design. The NHBC carried out the Sustainability assessments. The park was illuminated with a lighting scheme designed by Speirs + Major.

London's Olympic and Paralympic bid proposed that there would be four indoor arenas in the park in addition to the main venues, but the revised master plan published in 2006 reduced this to three, with the volleyball events moved to the Earls Court Exhibition Centre. The fencing arena was also cancelled, with the fencing events taking place at ExCeL London. The remaining indoor arenas are the Basketball Arena and the Copper Box, in addition to the Water Polo Arena, the Aquatics Centre, and the Velopark. The final design of the park was approved by the Olympic Delivery Authority and its planning-decisions committee.

=== Legacy List charity ===
The Legacy List is the independent charity for Queen Elizabeth Olympic Park, set up in 2011 to support the legacy of the Games. Their mission is to make creative connections between people and the Park by developing, commissioning and supporting high quality art, education and skill building initiatives, to engage, educate and inspire current and future generations.

=== Construction ===
During its construction over 80,000 workers were engaged on the project. The construction of the Olympic Park was managed by CLM Delivery Partner, comprising CH2M Hill, Laing O'Rourke and Mace. CLM specifically managed the "white" space between the venue construction zones, including managing the internal road network. To enable the major phase of construction to begin, the 52 electricity pylons, up to 65 metres (213 feet) high, that dominated the landscape in and around the park were removed and the power transferred through the new Lower Lea Valley Cable Tunnels constructed by Murphy. Also there was a Roman village underground when they were digging it up.

== Constituent sections of the park ==
- London Aquatics Centre
- Copper Box Arena
- Lee Valley Hockey and Tennis Centre
- Lee Valley VeloPark
- London Stadium
- ArcelorMittal Orbit
- East Village, London
- London Olympics Media Centre
- Stratford Cross
- Northern Parklands

In addition, at the time of the Olympic and Paralympic games:

- Eton Manor
- Riverbank Arena
- Water Polo Arena
- Basketball Arena
- Park Live
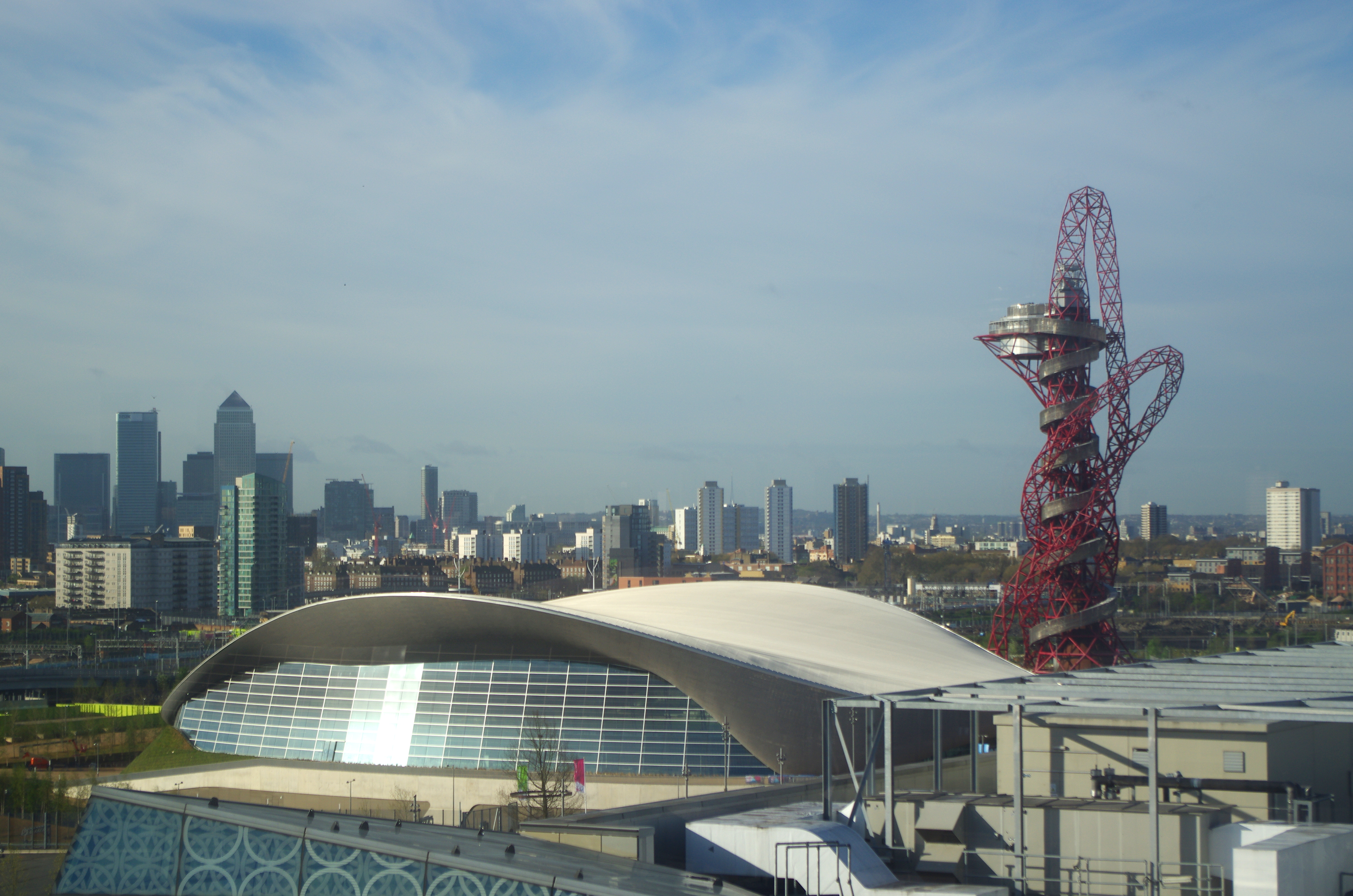
The London Aquatics Centre with the ArcelorMittal Orbit on the right

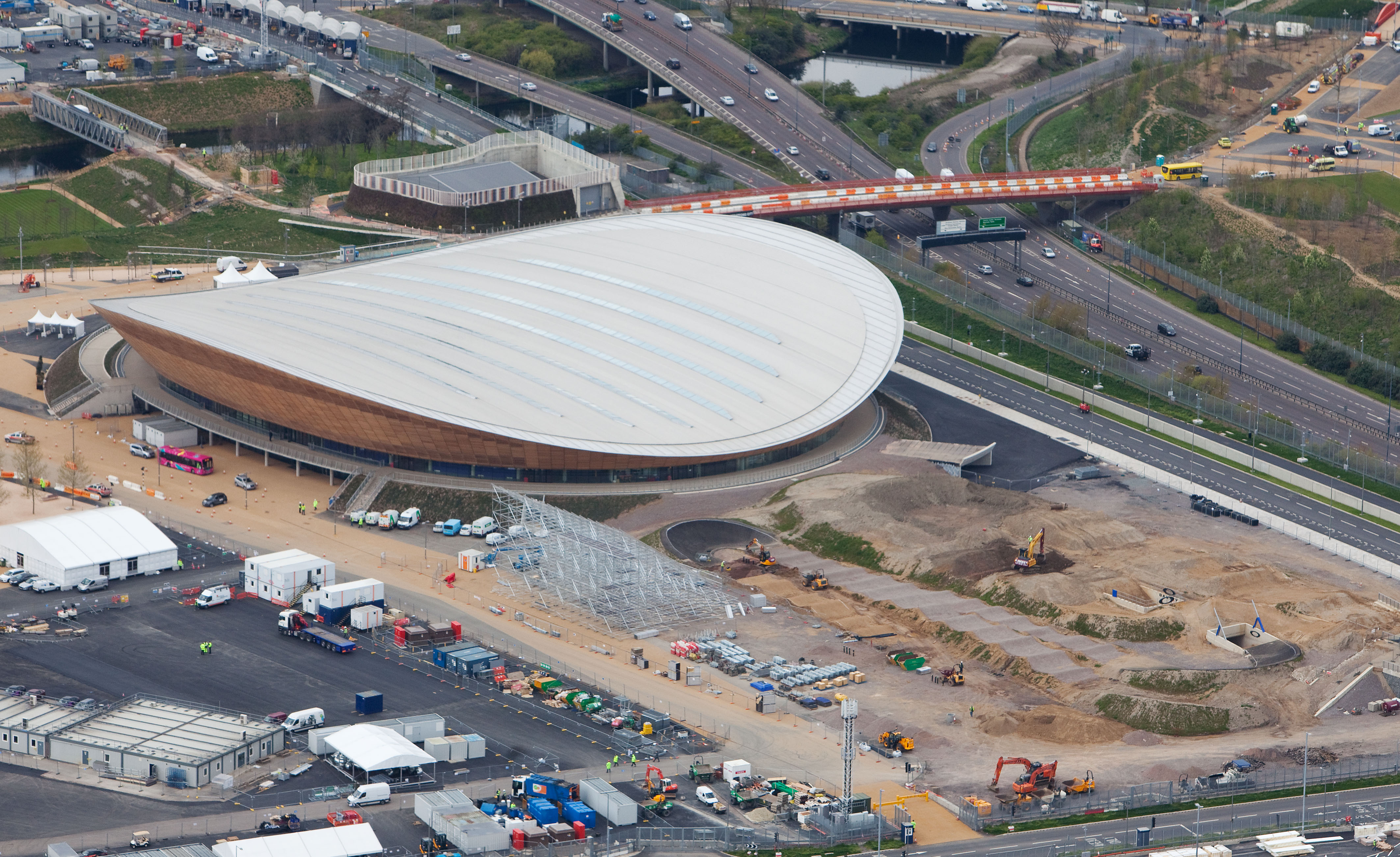
Lee Valley VeloPark

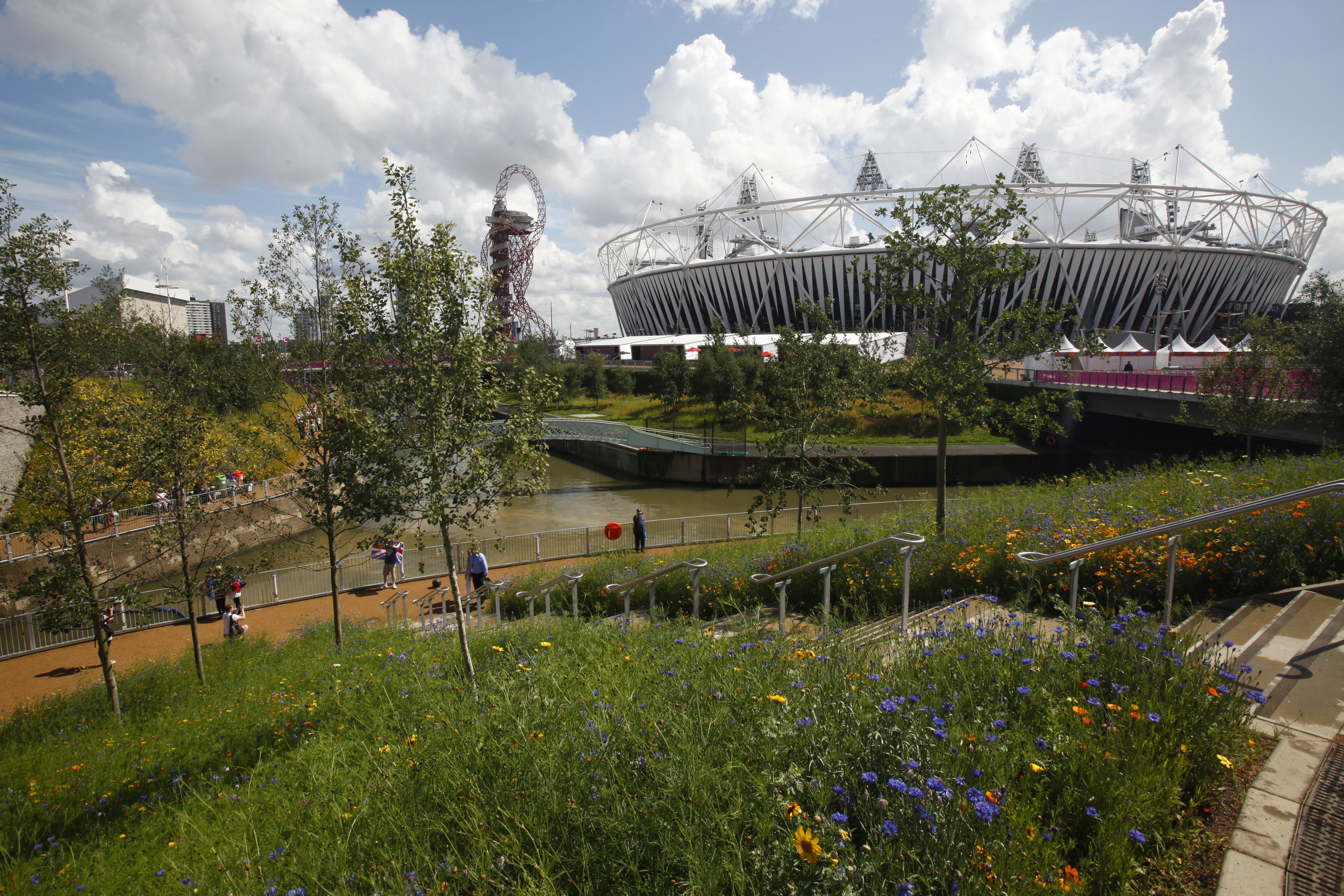
Olympic gardens in front of the River Lea and its tributary the City Mill River

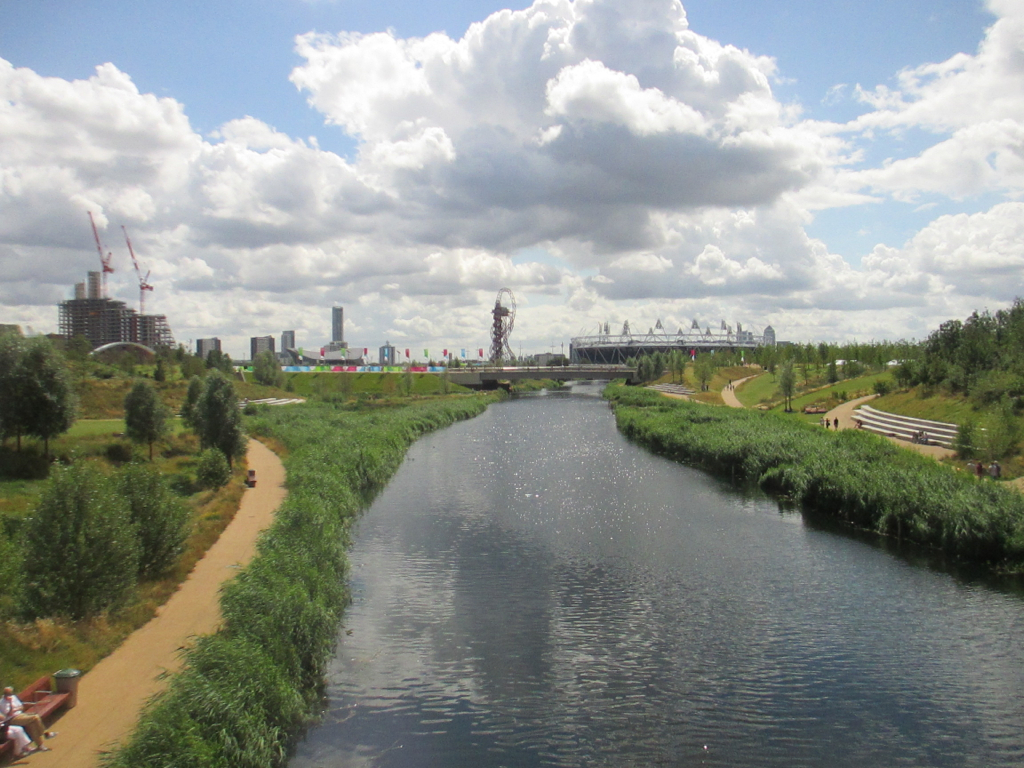
Northern Parklands with the River Lea, looking south

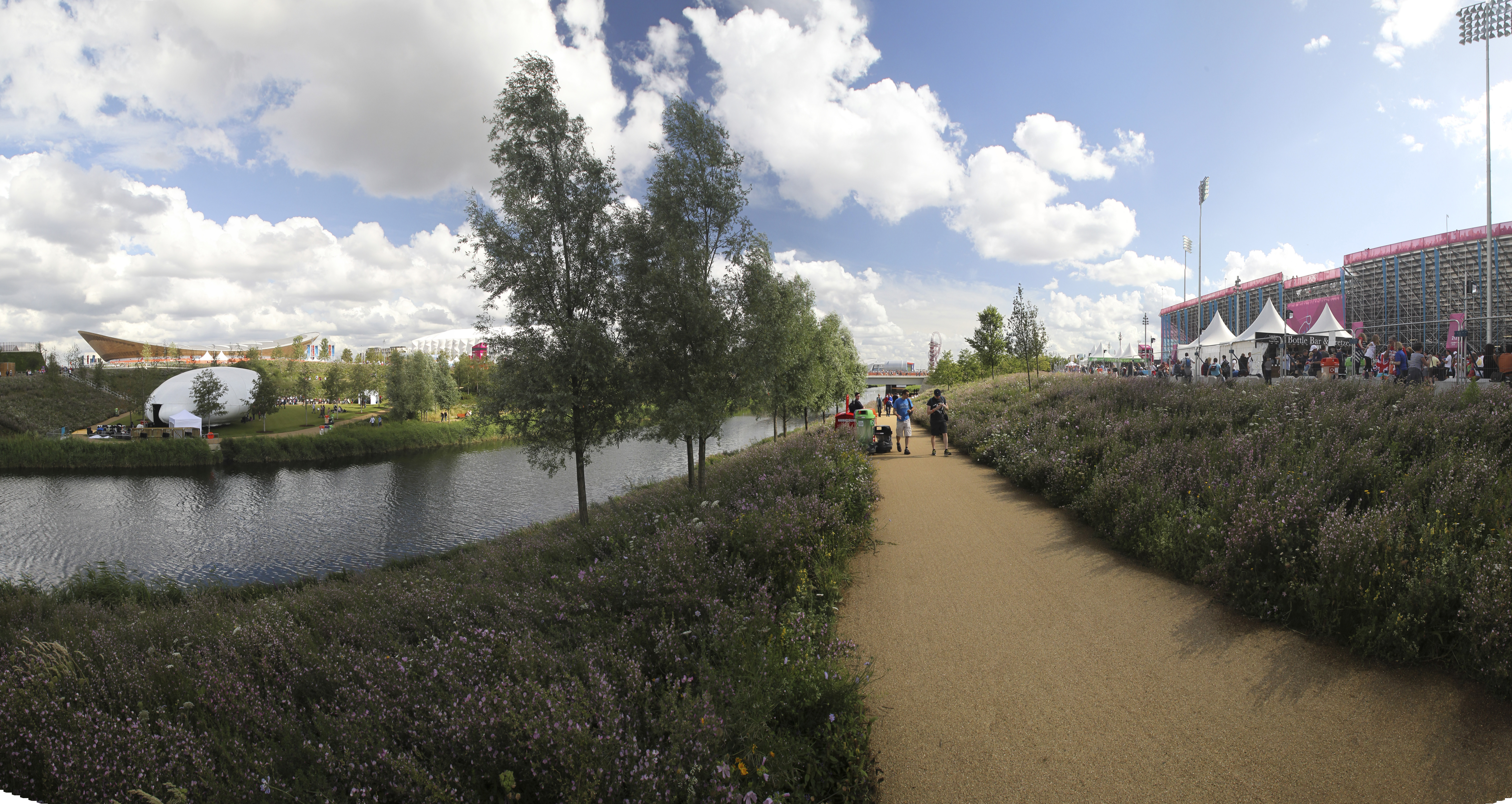
Northern Parklands with the River Lea, looking south

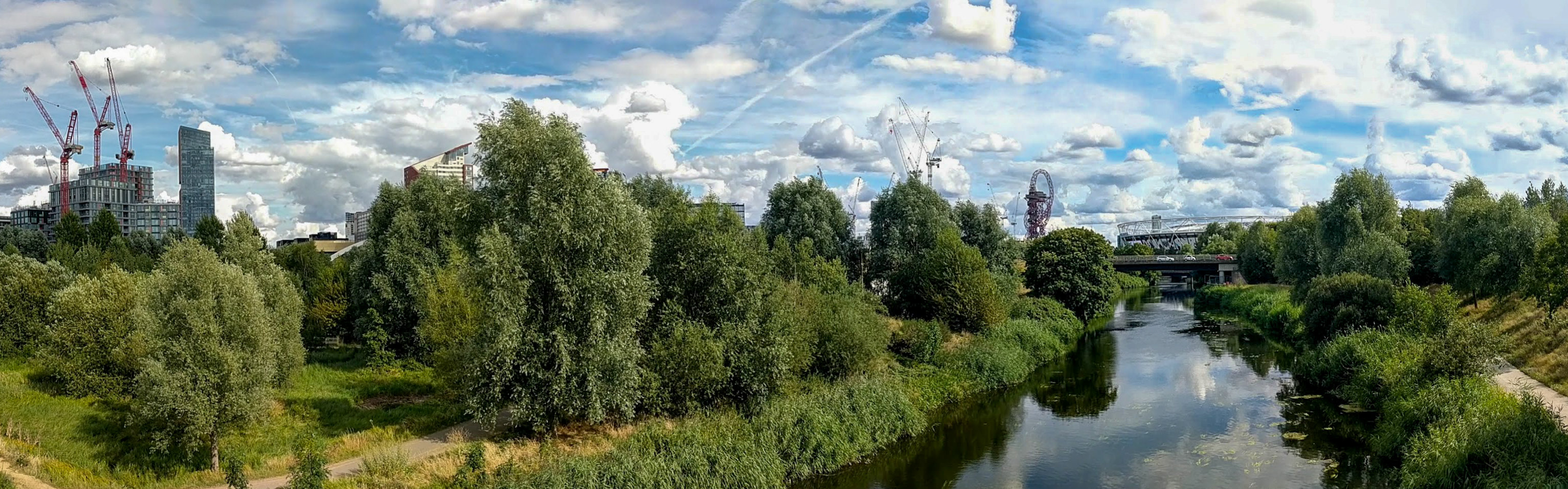
The park looking south from Eastcross Bridge

== Post-Olympics ==
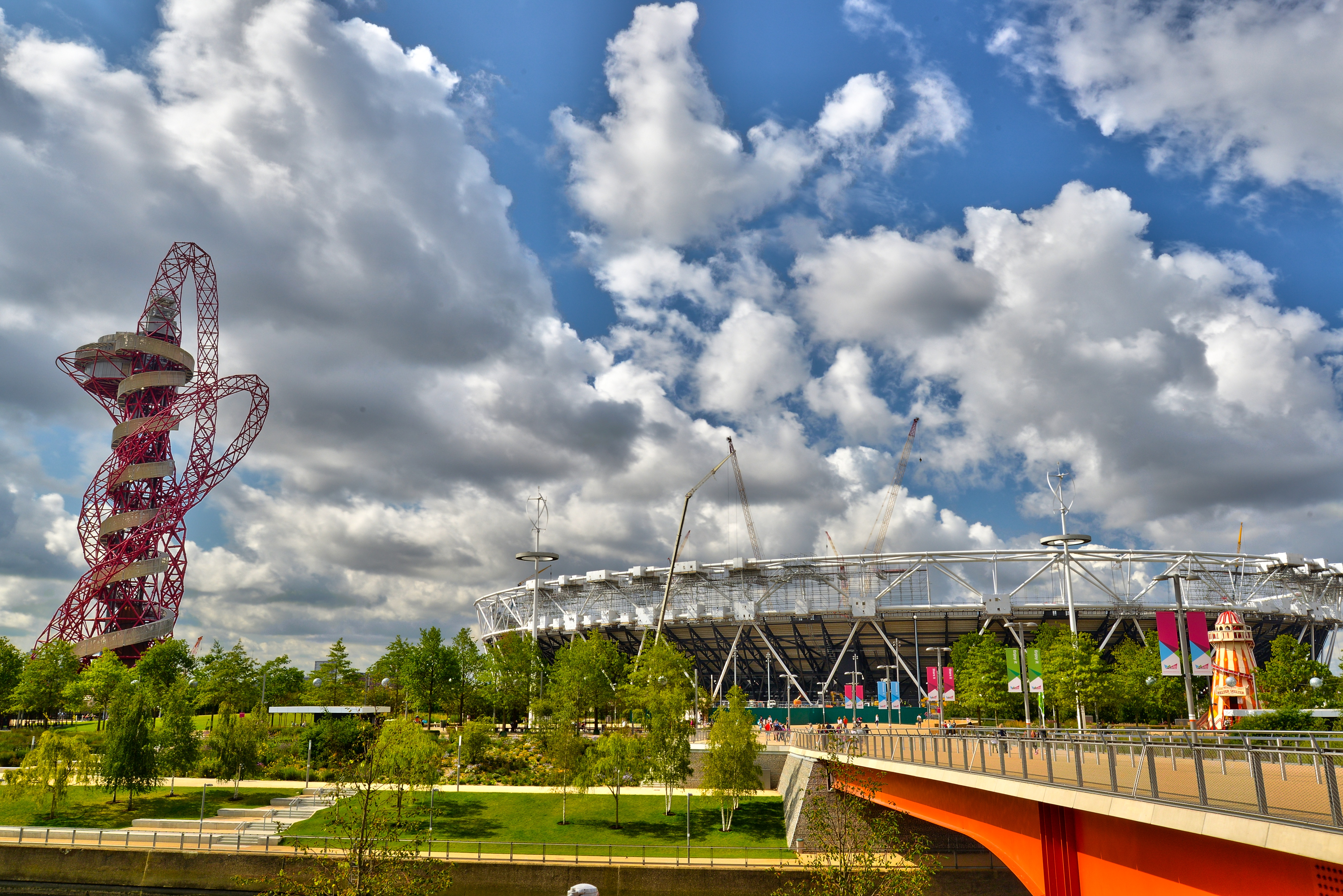
The ArcelorMittal Orbit

The park has been given over to a number of current and planned uses after the London 2012 Summer Olympics finished, such as:

- A part of the East London Tech City technology hub.
- One of the largest urban parks created in Western Europe for more than 150 years, designed to enrich and preserve the local environment, by restoring wetland habitats and planting native species of plants.
- 3,600 apartments, the East Village, next to the Stratford City neighbourhood of Stratford, London.
- The Manor Garden Allotments (reinstated after alternative use).
- The ArcelorMittal Orbit, a steel tower which is the largest public work of art in the UK and a tourist attraction.
- In 2012, it was announced that the UK's main Olympic Museum would be opened at the park in 2014 next to the ArcelorMittal Orbit. The plans were shelved in July 2013.
- A new Head Office for Transport for London, after the closure of 55 Broadway.
- Announced in November 2025, V&A East is set to open in April 2026 under director Gus Casely-Hayford, targeting younger audiences through inclusive, diverse design and programming as part of the £1.1 billion East Bank cultural district.

=== East Bank ===
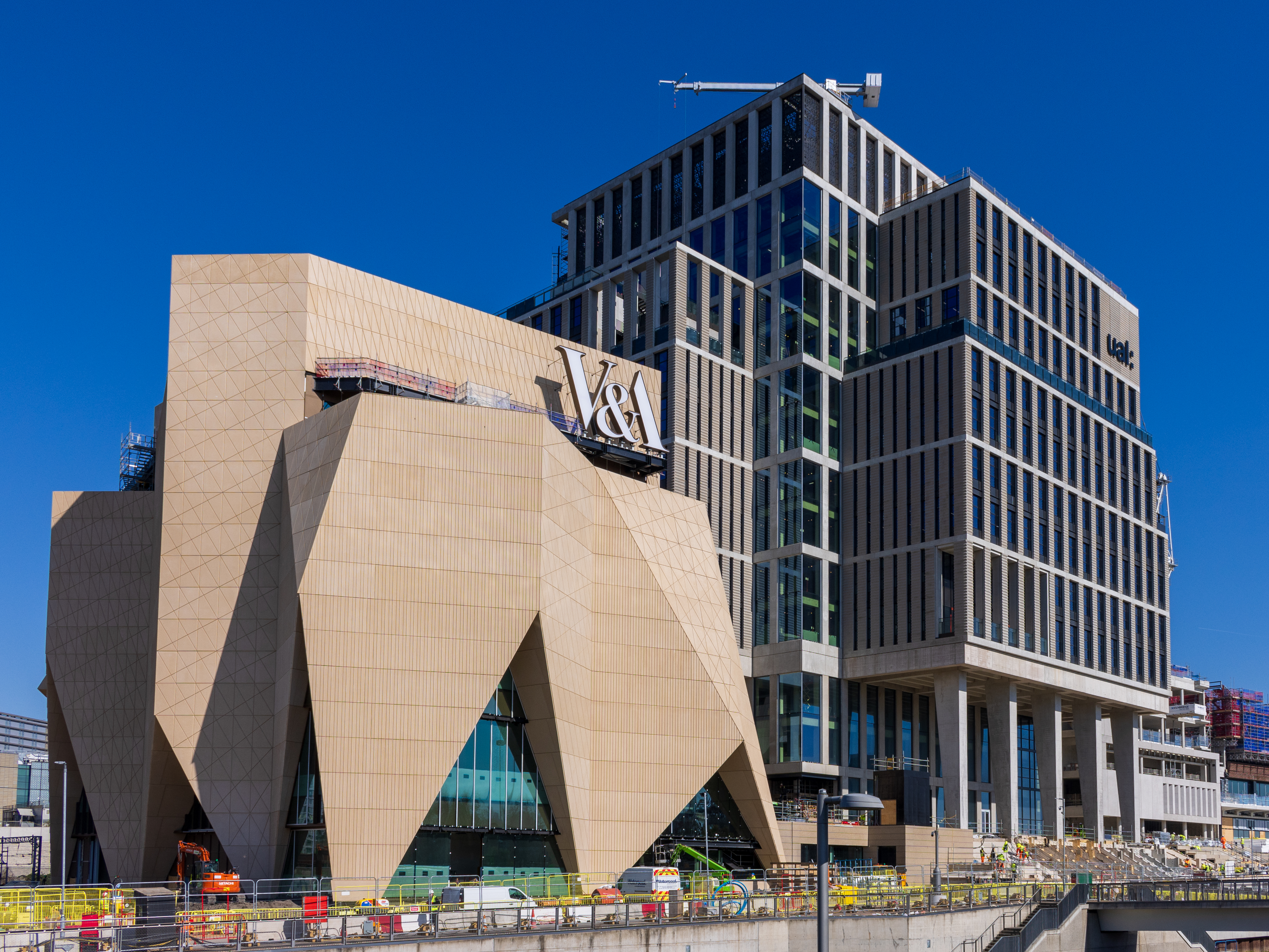
V&A East and UAL building construction in April 2023

As of January 2021, several arts and creativity institutions are constructing outposts at the park as part of a £1.1billion development, including:

- The Victoria and Albert Museum will open a new museum.
- Sadler's Wells Ballet Company has successfully opened a new 550-seat theatre.
- University College London opened its new UCL East campus within the park in 2023.
- The BBC has successfully relocated its famous Maida Vale Studios.
- University of the Arts London's London College of Fashion relocated to the park and opened its new campus in 2023.

=== Stratford Cross ===
Stratford Cross is a new commercial district in Stratford, East London, which hosted the London 2012 Olympic and Paralympic Games. It will be a mixed-use development, with a total investment of in excess of £1.3 billion, and will be delivered by Lendlease and London & Continental Railways in a 50/50 joint venture.

Stratford Cross will include 4 million sq ft of commercial office space, 330 homes known as Glasshouse Gardens and a new hotel. The area is accessible via Stratford station.

=== Subsequent international sporting events ===
Although the sporting venues in the park were reduced in scale after the conclusion of London 2012, part of the legacy is to ensure the continued use of those facilities that are permanent, as local and community resources and for major international sporting events that make use of the world class facilities constructed for the Olympics and Paralympics:

- The Stadium hosted the London Grand Prix athletics event starting in 2013.
- The third stage of the 2014 Tour de France between Cambridge and The Mall in London passed through the Queen Elizabeth Olympic Park.
- In September 2014 the first Invictus Games was held in the park.
- In 2010, a bid was submitted to use the Stadium as the venue for the 2015 World Athletics Championships. Due to the then uncertainty over the future use of the stadium, this bid was withdrawn, with instead a subsequent bid for the 2017 World Championships submitted instead. The success of this bid was announced on 13 November 2011.
- The men's and women's 2015 European hockey championships took place at the revamped Lee Valley Hockey Centre.
- Rugby World Cup 2015 Olympic stadium hosted several games.
- London was announced as the only formal bidder for the 2017 World Paralympic Championships in October 2012.
- In December 2012 the International Tennis Federation announced that the Lee Valley Hockey and Tennis Centre would host the NEC Wheelchair Tennis Masters between 2014 and 2016.
- London successfully bid for the right to hold the 2016 UCI Track Cycling World Championships and the 2016 European Aquatics Championships, which were held at the Velodrome and Aquatics Centre respectively.
- Track cycling events of the Birmingham 2022 Commonwealth Games were hosted at the Velodrome.

=== Resident sports clubs ===
In addition to the use of the venues for international events, some of them are intended for use on a regular basis by amateur and professional sports teams in various sports.

On 11 February 2011, West Ham United were selected as preferred bidders, ahead of Tottenham Hotspur, to take over the Olympic Stadium as a football venue after the end of the games. However, five days later Leyton Orient chairman Barry Hearn announced that he would be challenging the decision to allow West Ham to relocate to the stadium, as he believed that having West Ham playing within one mile (1.6 kilometres) of their Brisbane Road stadium could cost Orient support and even their existence. Incidentally, Hearn had expressed interest some years earlier in moving Orient to Olympic Park and reducing its capacity to 25,000 seats, while West Ham would cut the capacity to 60,000 if their relocation went ahead. Tottenham Hotspur also pursued legal action over the decision and eventually the deal with West Ham collapsed due to legal pressure on 11 October 2011. West Ham did go on to win the later tenancy bid and began using the stadium from the start of the 2016–17 football season as the main tenant.

The Copper Box was the only permanent indoor arena remaining after the end of London 2012. Built primarily for use in the handball and goalball competitions, it was converted to a multi-use venue that will include use for basketball. As a result of the owners of the Prestige Homes Arena in Milton Keynes terminating their lease, the London Lions basketball club, after a season at the National Sports Centre, Selhurst, relocated to the Copper Box for the 2013–14 BBL season.

The Lee Valley Hockey Centre was born from a revamp of the Olympic Legacy Hockey Facility. The facility is the current ground of Wapping Hockey Club. The centre includes two hockey pitches and is operated by the Lee Valley Regional Park Authority.

Following the demolition of the original warm-up track after the end of the Olympics, a new six-lane facility, the London Marathon Community Track, was constructed on the south side of the Olympic Stadium, for use both as a community venue and as a new home for Newham and Essex Beagles Athletic Club following the 2017 World Championships. Football side Altis FC, members of the Amateur Football Combination, are based at the stadium.

=== Concerts ===
In January 2013, music concert promoter Live Nation won the right to stage shows at the stadium and in the surrounding park. The park hosted the music events in July 2013, but the stadium was not used. The former site of the Riverbank Arena was used to stage the Hard Rock Calling, Wireless and Electric Daisy Carnival festivals.

The stadium has since hosted various concerts, including Guns N' Roses, AC/DC and Robbie Williams.

In 2021, ABBA began construction of a purpose-built arena in the Olympic Park, called the ABBA Arena, for a motion-capture hologram concert residency which would take place from May 2022. The announcement of the arena's construction and purpose took place during a YouTube livestream to announce the release of their album Voyage.

== Transport ==
=== Railway stations ===
- Stratford station is the main station in the area. Estimates showed Stratford to be the busiest railway station in the United Kingdom for the year ended 31 March 2021. It is the terminus of the London Underground Jubilee line from Stanmore, Wembley, the West End of London and Canary Wharf. London Underground Central line also serves the station with services from Epping, Loughton, Woodford, Hainault, West Ruislip, Ealing Broadway, Shepherd's Bush and the West End. The Stratford branch of the Docklands Light Railway (DLR) also terminates here with trains coming from Lewisham, Greenwich and Canary Wharf. The DLR Stratford International branch also runs through the station from Woolwich Arsenal, London City Airport, Beckton, ExCeL Centre at Custom House and Canning Town through to Stratford International. Stratford is also the terminus of the London Overground North London line with services from Richmond, Clapham Junction, Shepherd's Bush, Willesden Junction station, Hampstead Heath, Gospel Oak, Dalston Kingsland and Hackney Central. Greater Anglia operates frequent long-distance trains from this station to London Liverpool Street, Romford, Shenfield, Chelmsford, Colchester, Braintree, Bishop's Stortford, Ipswich, Southend, Clacton-on-Sea and Norwich. c2c also operates services to Tilbury, Basildon and Shoeburyness.
- Stratford International is on the high speed High Speed 1 line to Kent. Southeastern operates high speed services to St Pancras International, Gravesend, Chatham, Sittingbourne, Faversham, Ashford, Folkestone, Dover, Canterbury, Ramsgate and Margate. The Docklands Light Railway also serves the station with trains coming from Woolwich Arsenal station, London City Airport, Beckton, ExCeL Centre at Custom House, Canning Town and Stratford.
- Pudding Mill Lane DLR station is another DLR station just south of the park. It was rebuilt in 2014 after the Olympics; the previous station was so small that it was closed during the Olympics for safety reasons. DLR trains serve the station from Stratford, Lewisham, Greenwich and Canary Wharf.
- Hackney Wick railway station is on the London Overground North London line with services from Stratford to Richmond and Clapham Junction via Shepherd's Bush.

=== London Buses ===
==== Bus stations ====
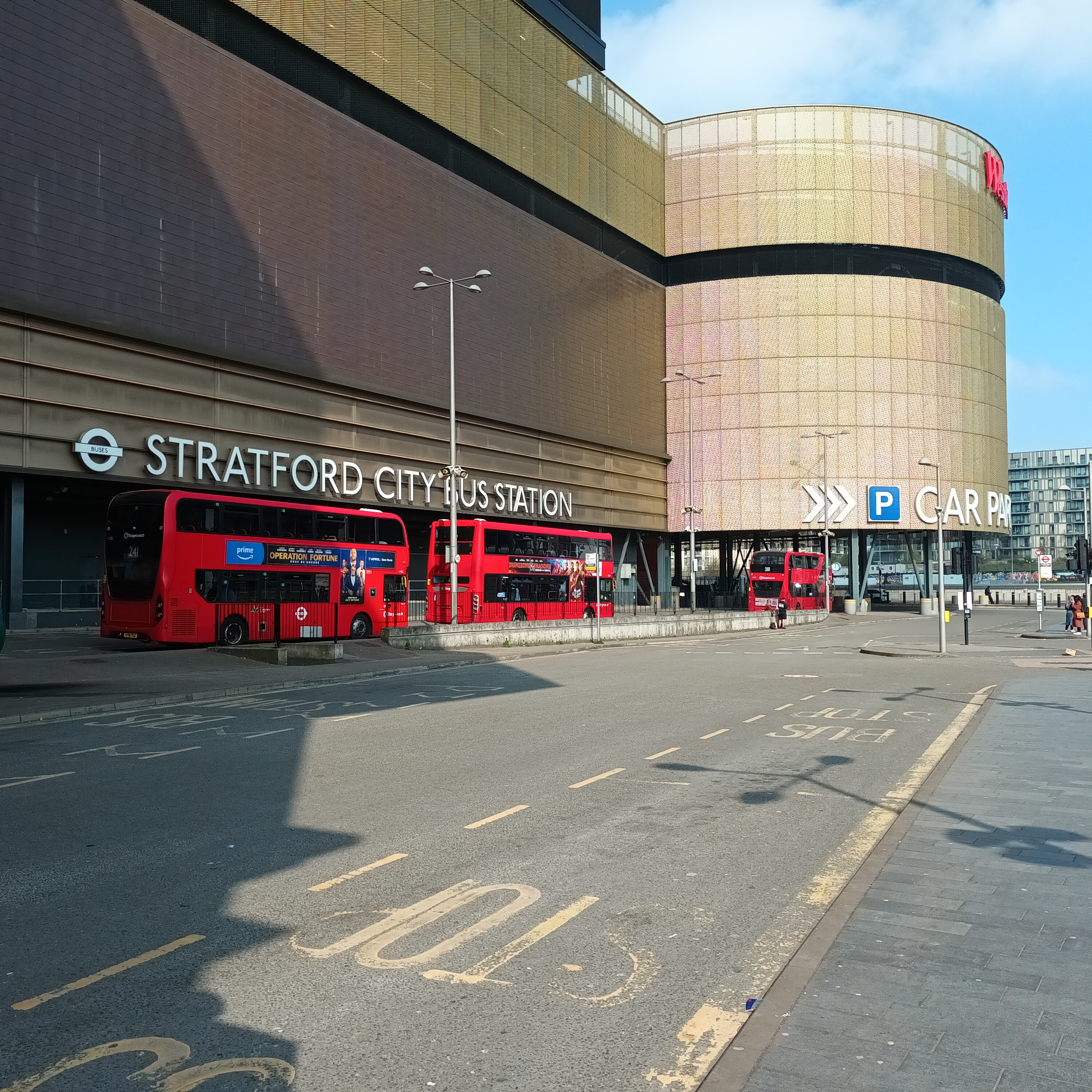
Stratford City bus station

- Stratford City bus station has buses to Walthamstow, Chingford, Canning Town, Greenwich Peninsula, Lewisham, Clapton, Leytonstone and Shadwell with also route 388 serving it to London Bridge. National Express and Airport Bus Express operate 24-hour coach services to London Stansted Airport.
- Stratford bus station has bus services to many parts of East London, including Barking, Canary Wharf, Ilford, Romford and Walthamstow, plus route 25 to the City of London.

== See also ==
- 2012 in architecture
- 2012 in sports
- 2012 Summer Olympics
