= Park Live =

London 2012 Olympic Park event

Park Live London 2012
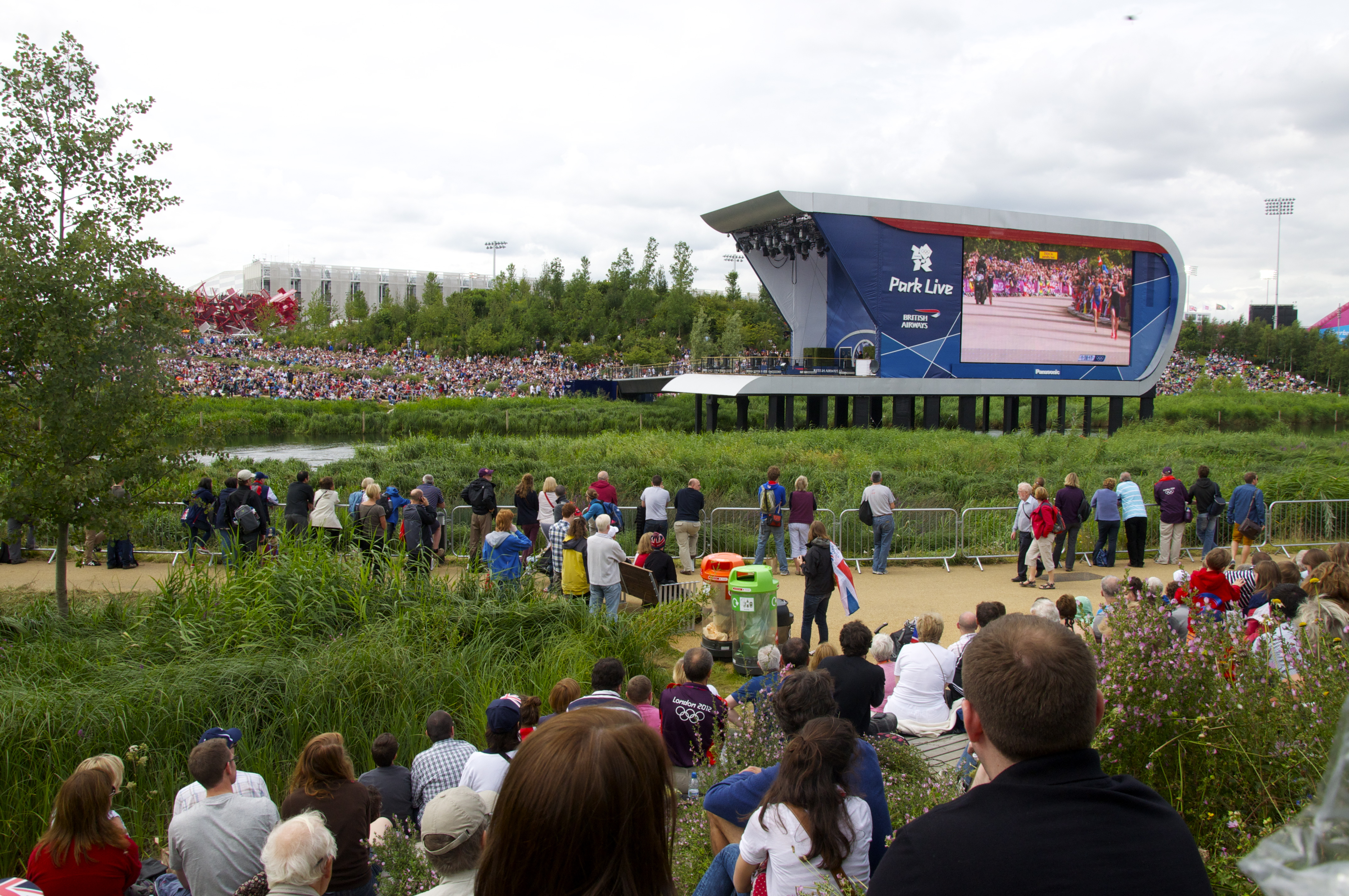
- Locations: Queen Elizabeth Olympic Park Stratford, London E20
- Years active: July to September 2012

Park Live presented by British Airways was the flagship London 2012 Olympic Live Site funded by commercial partners and the National Lottery, forming part of a programme of 70 live sites across the United Kingdom during the London 2012 Olympic Games; designed to bring live games and event spaces to the heart of every Nation and Region of the UK.

Park Live was a specially built dedicated area in the heart of the Queen Elizabeth Olympic Park in Stratford accommodating over 15,000 spectators and park visitors, created to enhance their Olympic Park experience. It was the fifth largest venue on the London 2012 Olympic Park and the first time a live site of this type had ever been created inside an Olympic Park.

During the London 2012 Olympic and Paralympic Games, Park Live hosted approximately one million spectators. It played an important role in managing the flow of visitors across the Olympic Park, providing live broadcast coverage of sporting events from inside Olympic Park venues and from other games venues around the UK, as well as providing live information and entertainment to make spectators' visits more enjoyable and ease their onward journeys.

== Location ==
Park Live was located in the northern part of the Queen Elizabeth Olympic Park, sited in a wetland bowl on banks of the River Lea. It straddled Sectors 5 and 6 of the park and spanned two London Boroughs (the Park Live East Lawns were in the London Borough of Newham and the Park Live West Lawns were in the London Borough of Hackney) and was situated between the Velodrome, Basketball Arena, Copper Box and the Riverbank Arena.

== Games Time ==
At the heart of Park Live was a huge temporary structure built on stilts in the River Lea, consisting of two giant Panasonic screens broadcasting live coverage of the Olympic and Paralympic Games from 0700 until midnight on every day of the games. This structure also included the British Airways Stage, where medal-winning athletes were interviewed live after competing, a VIP green room for athletes and guests, and live production facilities for 30 staff. The screens also broadcast daily games highlights, sport information films and sponsor messages. Approximately 4,200m2 of reclaimed parklands were dedicated for spectators to enjoy the Park Live experience.

During the London 2012 games Park Live became known as the Henman Hill of the Olympic Park and was regularly featured in national and international news and television coverage, with broadcasters frequently cutting to Park Live for crowd reaction to sporting events, and reporters conducting interviews with spectators.

Each day of the London 2012 Olympic and Paralympic Games, Park Live played host to numerous celebrities and medal-winning athletes including, Sir Chris Hoy, Jessica Ennis, Ben Ainslie, Rebecca Adlington, Dame Kelly Holmes, Denise Lewis OBE and Lord Sebastian Coe.

== Awards ==
In March 2013 Park Live presented by British Airways was awarded the title of "Best Live Experience of 2012' at the BT Sport Industry Awards in London.

== Future Plans ==
Plans are currently under discussion to create similar Park Live and live site experiences at future Olympic and Paralympic Games.
