= Urban meadow =

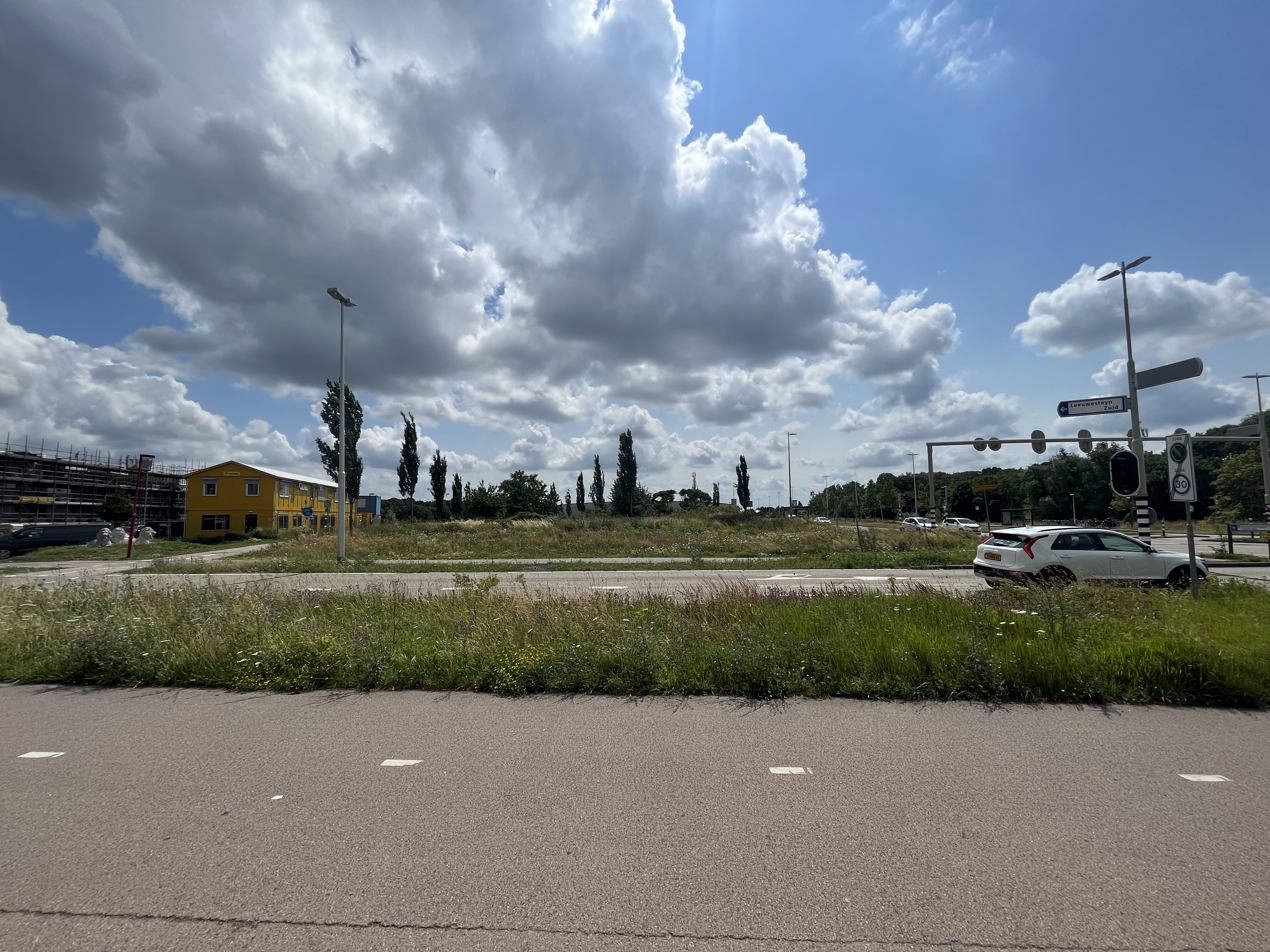
Urban meadow as seen at Willem-Alexanderpark, Utrecht, the Netherlands

An urban meadow is a meadow which is influenced both by the environmental conditions of a city and the aesthetic and social needs of its residents. This differs from other meadow types as it is a highly engineered, novel, and site-specific designed landscape as well as an example of a nature-based solution (NBS).

Recently, urban areas have been thought of as potential biodiversity conservation sites. The shift from urban lawns, that are widely spread habitats in cities, to urban meadows is thought to promote greater refuges for plant and animal communities. Urban lawns require intensive management that puts the life there at risk of losing their habitat, especially due to the mowing frequency. Cutting that mowing frequency has demonstrated to induce a clear positive effect on the plant community's diversity, which allows the switch from urban lawns to urban meadows.

Due to increased urbanization, the EU Biodiversity Strategy 2017 decreed that there is a need to protect all ecosystems due to climate change. The majority of the people that live in the urban regions of any country usually get their plant knowledge from visiting parks and or public green infrastructure. Local authorities have the duty of providing the green spaces for the public, but these departments are constantly suffering major budget cuts, making it more difficult for people to admire natural wildlife in the urban sectors and also impairing the local ecosystem. In line with the increasing acceptance of a "messier urban aesthetic", the perennial meadows can be seen as a more realistic alternative to the classic urban lawns as they would also be more cost-efficient to maintain. Factors that managers of urban spaces list as important to regard are:

- Aesthetics and public reaction
- Locational context
- Human Resources and economic sustainability
- Local politics
- Communication
- Biodiversity and existing habitat
- Physical factors.

== Evaluation methods ==
In plant ecology, there are two methods of sampling, often used in conjunction, that have come to be widely seen as standard practice. First described by Frederic Edward Clements and Roscoe Pound in their 1898 publication "A Method of Determining the Abundance of Secondary Species", the use of quadrats and transects is still applied in ecology today. This includes the study of urban meadows.

A quadrat is simply a square, typically around one meter, but sometimes bigger or smaller, used to define an area for collecting data. They are often made out of PVC, wood, or rope depending on the application and size. Quadrats are used to provide a randomized sample of a larger area of interest. Quadrats can be used for collecting all sorts of ecological data, from species occurrence and abundance, to soil quality, to biomass harvesting and sampling.

Transects are used to describe how vegetation does or does not change over a given area. It is similar to the idea of an architectural cross section. Transects and quadrats can even be paired so that randomized samples can be taken along a particular path crossing the study area. The main goal in using a transect method versus a quadrat method would be to show the spatial relations of plants and landforms within the geographic scope of research.

== Differences based on climate zones across Europe ==
This map classifies the climate zones of the European countries where authors cited in this article conducted their research (created using mapchart.net)

Vegetation varies based on climate and hardiness zones. Plants and their communities are also often determined by geographical features such as bodies of water and mountain ranges. Much of the research regarding urban meadows has occurred in several areas of the European continent. Knowing how different climate zones impact urban meadows is important in understanding their specific functions.

=== Mediterranean climate ===
The Mediterranean climate found in countries such as Portugal and Italy is defined by mild but wet winters and hot dry summers. Novel urban meadow communities can be created by taking biennial and perennial species from locally native Mediterranean grasslands and adding native annuals to enhance its aesthetic value while maintaining or even improving resiliency. Grasslands and meadows are the predominant plant communities in this climate zone although agriculture has become a big part of the landscape. With meadow as the standard plant community for this climate zone, its importance to the local ecosystem and its resilience as a community is greatly strengthened.

=== Continental climate ===
The continental climate found in countries like Germany and Poland can be defined by hot humid summers and cold winters. One of the challenges of this climate both in terms of evaluating ecological and social impact is the harsher winters. These more extreme seasonal changes also have an impact on meadow treatment and maintenance.

=== Alpine climate ===
The temperate alpine climate of countries such as Switzerland is defined has both mild winters and summers with no discernible wet season. Even being mild, this climate zone still has four distinct seasons, much like most other mid-latitude climates. This can be noted in blooming and pollination patterns where trees bloom early (really starting in May) and in abundance while herbaceous plants, especially grasses, become the main source for pollinators in mid- to late-summer. Such specific and predictable seasonal trends are important factors for designing for maximum positive ecological impact.

== Impact on pollinators ==
Across Europe, it has been reported that pollinator populations are dropping likely due to more intensive agricultural practices as well as rapid urbanization. Regardless, urban conditions do not seem to affect behavior of pollinators or their interaction with flowers, with the exception of butterflies. In fact, it is likely that cities have become a refuge for pollinators.

== Social context ==
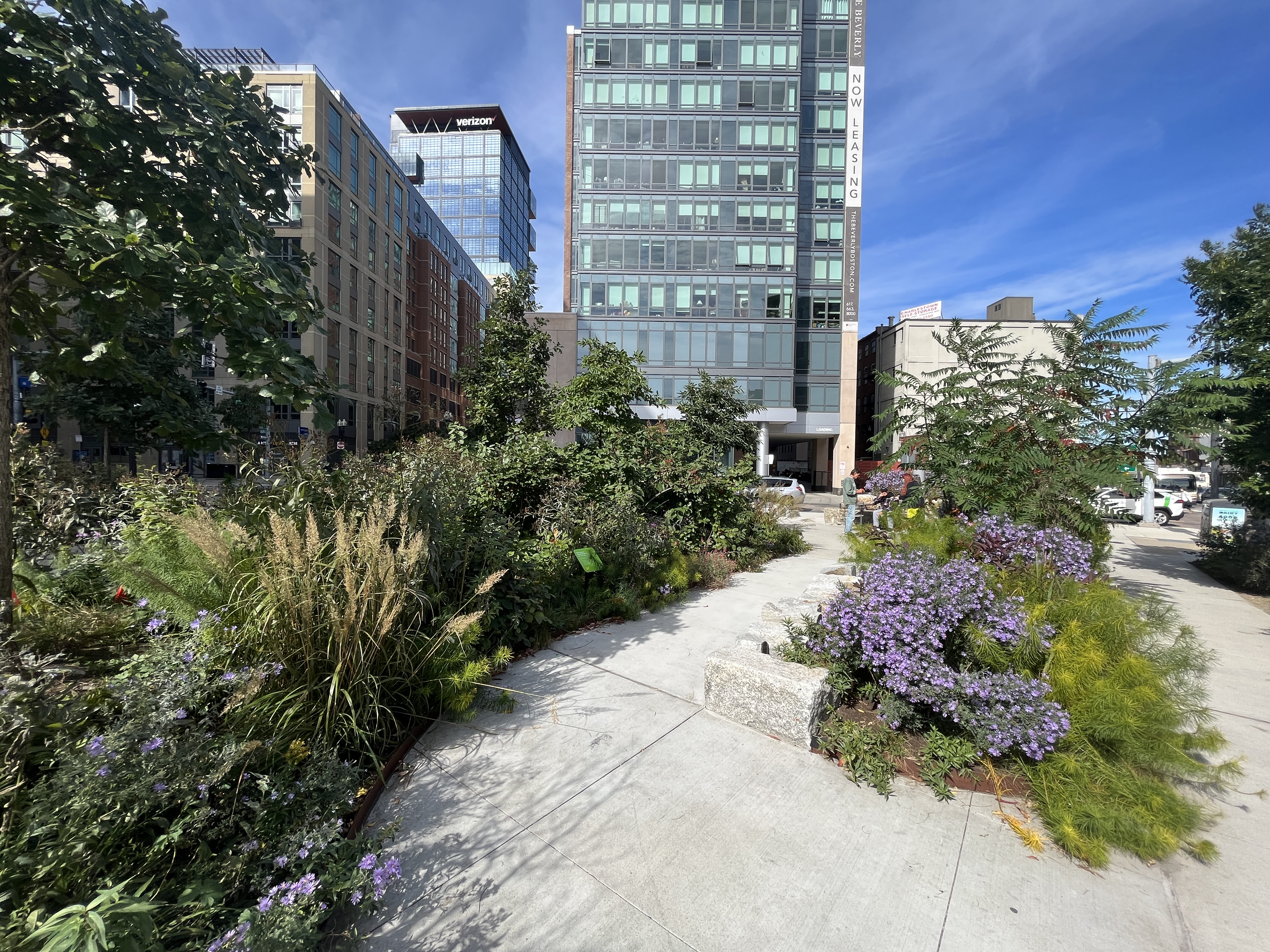
North Meadow on the Greenway, Boston, MA, US; part of the Rose Fitzgerald Kennedy Greenway

=== Aesthetics ===
Part of the design process of urban meadows is the recognition of them existing as public amenities in addition to increasing biodiversity, pollinator habitat, and green space--thus improving infiltration and urban heat. Due to this fact, the aesthetic value of an urban meadow becomes more important than in other meadow types. There are two different approaches to this concern.

One solution is to choose a design that highly imitates what the natural meadow condition would be for that specific location, such as at Willem-Alexanderpark shown above. This is consistent with the technique of matrix planting popularized by landscape designers such as Piet Oudolf and Nigel Dunnett.

The other solution is to create a meadow that is based mainly around meadow plants, but assembled in a form that is less 'wild' and more manicured and horticultural, such as North Meadow on the Greenway shown at right.

=== Children ===
Another area of research concerning the social contextualization of urban green space, including meadows, is perception by children. When investigating how children between 8 and 10 years of age idealized interaction with green space, 'meadow' was one of the most common words with positive-association mentioned by study participants.
