= Davies White =

Landscape architects

Davies White is the landscape architectural practice founded by Adam White and Andrée Davies in 2008.

They specialise in designing gardens and play areas for children and have won multiple awards for these. In 2017, they designed a children's wild garden for the Cauldwell charity for disabled children. This was sponsored by Zoflora and exhibited at the Hampton Court Palace Flower Show where it won three awards: an RHS gold medal, Best in Show and the People's Choice. In 2019, they collaborated with Catherine, Duchess of Cambridge, to design a back to nature garden sponsored by the RHS and exhibited at the Chelsea Flower Show This was tested by the Duchess's children as the garden contained play features such as a hollow log and rope swing.

Director Adam White was the President of the Landscape Institute from 2018-2020 and is a Fellow of the Landscape Institute
