= James Hitchmough =

British horticulturalist and author

James Donald Hitchmough (born 2 September 1956) is a British horticulturalist and author. He is emeritus professor of Horticultural Ecology at the University of Sheffield.

In 2024, he received the Lifetime Achievement Award from the Council of the Society of Garden Designers.

== Books ==
- Gardener's Choice: Fine Plants for All Seasons (1987)
- Urban Landscape Management (Inkata Press, 1994)
- The Dynamic Landscape: Design, Ecology and Management of Naturalistic Urban Planting James Hitchmough and Nigel Dunnett (Taylor & Francis, 2004)
- Sowing Beauty: Designing Flowering Meadows from Seed (Timber Press, 2017)
