= DCS Europe =

Seller and distributor of health, beauty and household brands

DCS Group (UK) Ltd
- Company type: Privately held company
- Founded: 1994
- Founder: Denys C. Shortt OBE
- Headquarters: Banbury, United Kingdom
- Key people: Denys C. Shortt OBE
- Services: Distribution
- Number of employees: 320
- Website: dcsgroup.com

DCS Group (UK) Ltd (formerly DCS Europe plc) is a seller and distributor of health, beauty and household brands working through a number of subsidiary companies and based in Banbury, Oxfordshire, England. The "DCS" in the name refers to Denys C. Shortt OBE, who founded the company in 1994. The business had an annual turnover of over £149 million in 2012.

== History ==
The business reportedly had sales of £185.6 million in 2015.

DCS Group UK Ltd has its own brands of beauty products, Enliven and Natural Elements. The brands are exported to 70 countries worldwide.

In 2012, export sales fell from £16 million to £13.5 million.

In 2016 DCS was named as a Sunday Times TopTrack 250 Company for the second year running.

In 2024 The Grocer magazine stated DCS Group UK turnover was £350m.

== DCS companies ==
- DCS Group Holdings
- DCS Inc
- DCS Central
- DCS Export
- DCS Manufacturing
- DCS Repacking
- DCS High Street Discount
- Poundzone
- Enliven
- DCS Category Management
