= Zaha Hadid =

Iraqi and British architect (1950–2016)

Dame Zaha Hadid DBE RA
- زهاء حديد
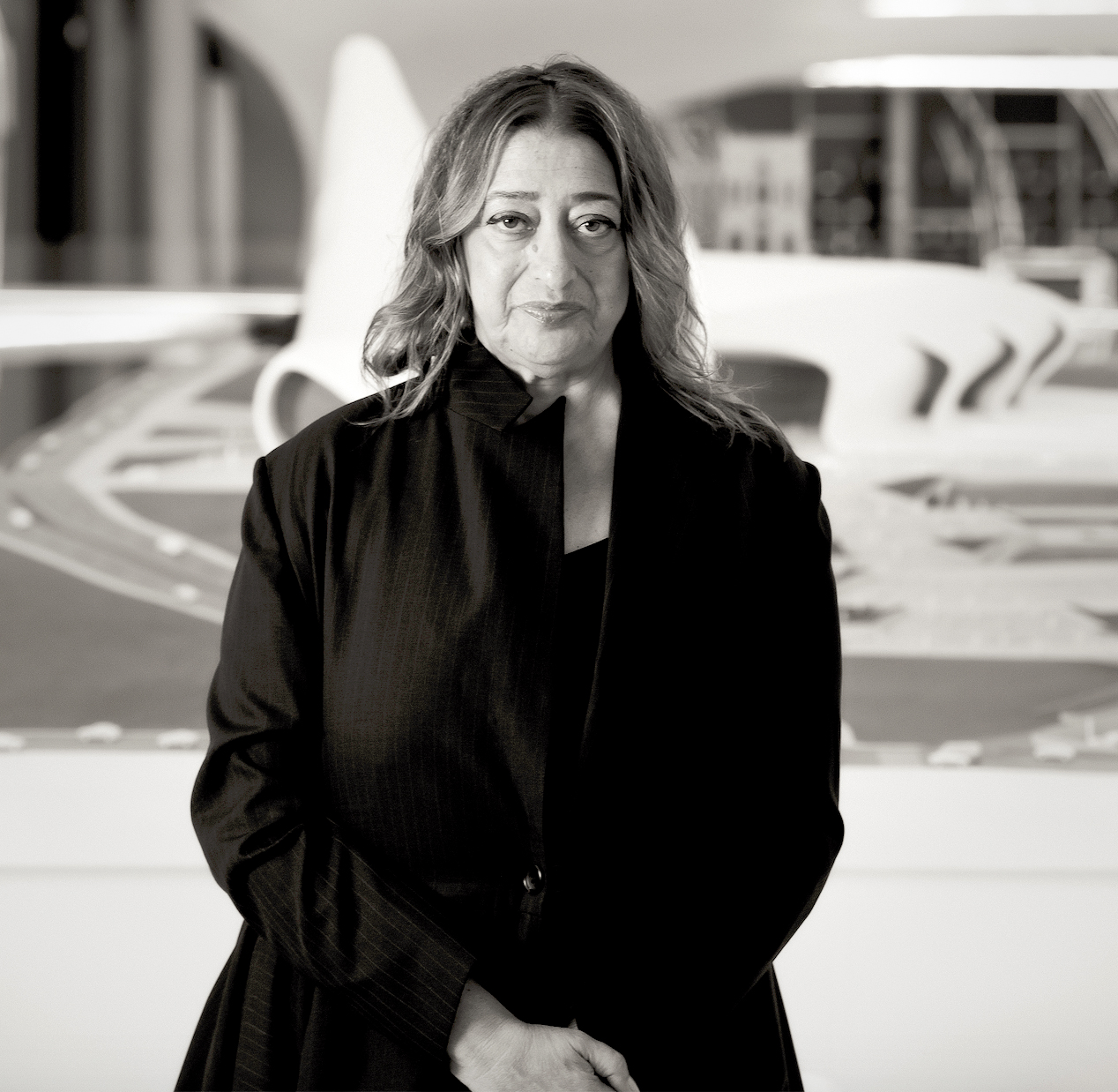
- Hadid in 2013
- Born: Zaha Mohammad Hadid; 31 October 1950; Baghdad, Kingdom of Iraq
- Died: 31 March 2016 (aged 65); Miami Beach, Florida, U.S.
- Citizenship: Iraq; United Kingdom
- Education: American University of Beirut; Architectural Association School of Architecture
- Occupation: Architect
- Parent(s): Mohammed Hadid; Wajeeha Sabonji
- Practice: Zaha Hadid Architects
- Buildings: Vitra Fire Station, MAXXI, Bridge Pavilion, Contemporary Arts Center, Heydar Aliyev Center, Riverside Museum, Royal Theathre Rabat
- Website: www.zaha-hadid.com

Dame Zaha Mohammad Hadid (Arabic: زهاء حديد, romanized: Zahā' Ḥadīd; 31 October 1950 – 31 March 2016) was an Iraqi and British architect, artist, and designer. She is recognised as a key figure in the architecture of the late-20th and early-21st centuries. Born in Baghdad, Iraq, Hadid studied mathematics as an undergraduate and later enrolled at the Architectural Association School of Architecture in 1972. In search of an alternative to traditional architectural drawing, and influenced by Suprematism and the Russian avant-garde, Hadid adopted painting as a design tool and abstraction as a method to "reinvestigate the aborted and untested experiments of Modernism [...] to unveil new fields of building".

She was described by The Guardian as the "Queen of Curves", who "liberated architectural geometry, giving it a whole new expressive identity". Her major works include the London Aquatics Centre for the 2012 Olympics, the Broad Art Museum, Rome's MAXXI Museum, and the Guangzhou Opera House. Some of her awards have been presented posthumously, including the statuette for the 2017 Brit Awards. She was also recognized by the 2013 Forbes List as one of the "World's Most Powerful Women". Several of her buildings were still under construction at the time of her death, including the Daxing International Airport in Beijing and the Al Wakrah Stadium (now Al Janoub) in Qatar, a venue for the 2022 FIFA World Cup.

Hadid was the first woman to receive the Pritzker Architecture Prize, in 2004. She also received the UK's most prestigious architectural award, the Stirling Prize, in 2010 and 2011. In 2012, she was made a Dame by Elizabeth II for services to architecture, and in February 2016, the month before her death, she became the first woman to be individually awarded the Royal Gold Medal from the Royal Institute of British Architects (Ray Eames and Sheila O'Donnell had previously received it jointly with Charles Eames and John Tuomey respectively).

== Early life and family ==
Zaha Hadid was born on 31 October 1950 in Baghdad, Iraq, to an upper-class Iraqi family. Her father, Muhammad al-Hajj Husayn Hadid, was a wealthy industrialist from Mosul. He co-founded the socialist al-Ahali group in 1932, a significant political organisation in the 1930s and 1940s. He also co-founded the National Democratic Party in Iraq and served as minister of finance after the 1958 Iraqi coup d'état, under the government of General Abd al-Karim Qasim. Her mother, Wajiha al-Sabunji, was an artist from Mosul and her brother, Foulath Hadid, was a writer, accountant and expert on Arab affairs. In an interview, Hadid recalled that early childhood trips to the ancient Sumerian cities in southern Iraq sparked her interest in architecture. In the 1960s, she attended boarding schools in England and Switzerland. Hadid was unmarried and had no children.

== Career ==
Hadid studied mathematics at the American University of Beirut before moving, in 1972, to London to study at the Architectural Association School of Architecture. There she studied with Rem Koolhaas, Elia Zenghelis and Bernard Tschumi. Her former professor Koolhaas described her at graduation as "a planet in her own orbit." Zenghelis described her as the most outstanding pupil he ever taught. 'We called her the inventor of the 89 degrees. Nothing was ever at 90 degrees. She had spectacular vision. All the buildings were exploding into tiny little pieces." He recalled that she was less interested in details, such as staircases. "The way she drew a staircase you would smash your head against the ceiling, and the space was reducing and reducing, and you would end up in the upper corner of the ceiling. She couldn't care about tiny details. Her mind was on the broader picture—when it came to the joinery she knew we could fix that later. She was right." Her AA graduation thesis, Malevich's Tektonik, was a concept and design for a 14-level hotel on London's Hungerford Bridge executed as an acrylic painting, inspired by the works of the Suprematist artist Kazimir Malevich.

After graduation in 1977, she went to work for her former professors, Koolhaas and Zenghelis at the Office for Metropolitan Architecture in Rotterdam, the Netherlands. Through her association with Koolhaas, she met the architectural engineer Peter Rice, who supported and encouraged her during the early stages of her career. Hadid became a naturalised citizen of the United Kingdom. She opened her own architectural firm, Zaha Hadid Architects, in London in 1980. During the early 1980s, Hadid introduced audiences to a new modern architectural style through her highly detailed and professional sketches. At a time when architectural focus was shifting toward postmodernism, her approach stood out and set apart from other designers.

She then began her teaching career at the Architectural Association and later held positions at the Harvard Graduate School of Design, Cambridge University, the University of Chicago, the Hochschule für bildende Künste in Hamburg, the University of Illinois at Chicago, and Columbia University. She earned her early reputation through lecturing and radical, colourful designs and projects, which were widely published in architectural journals but largely remained unbuilt. Her ambitious but unrealized projects included The Peak in Hong Kong (1983) and a plan for an opera house in Cardiff, Wales, (1994). The Cardiff experience was particularly discouraging: although her design was selected as the best by the competition jury, the Millennium Commission, acting as funding body, refused to support it, and the project was awarded to another architect. Hadid responded to the decision by asking "Do they want nothing but mediocrity?". Her reputation during this period rested largely on her teaching and the imaginative, vibrant paintings she made of her proposed buildings.

Her international profile rose significantly in 1988 when she was selected as one of seven architects featured in the "Deconstructivism in Architecture" exhibition curated by Philip Johnson and Mark Wigley at New York's Museum of Modern Art. That exhibition, along with a conference at the Tate in London and increased press coverage, helped establish her name globally and allowed her work to be associated with a distinct architectural style.

== Early buildings (1991–2005) ==
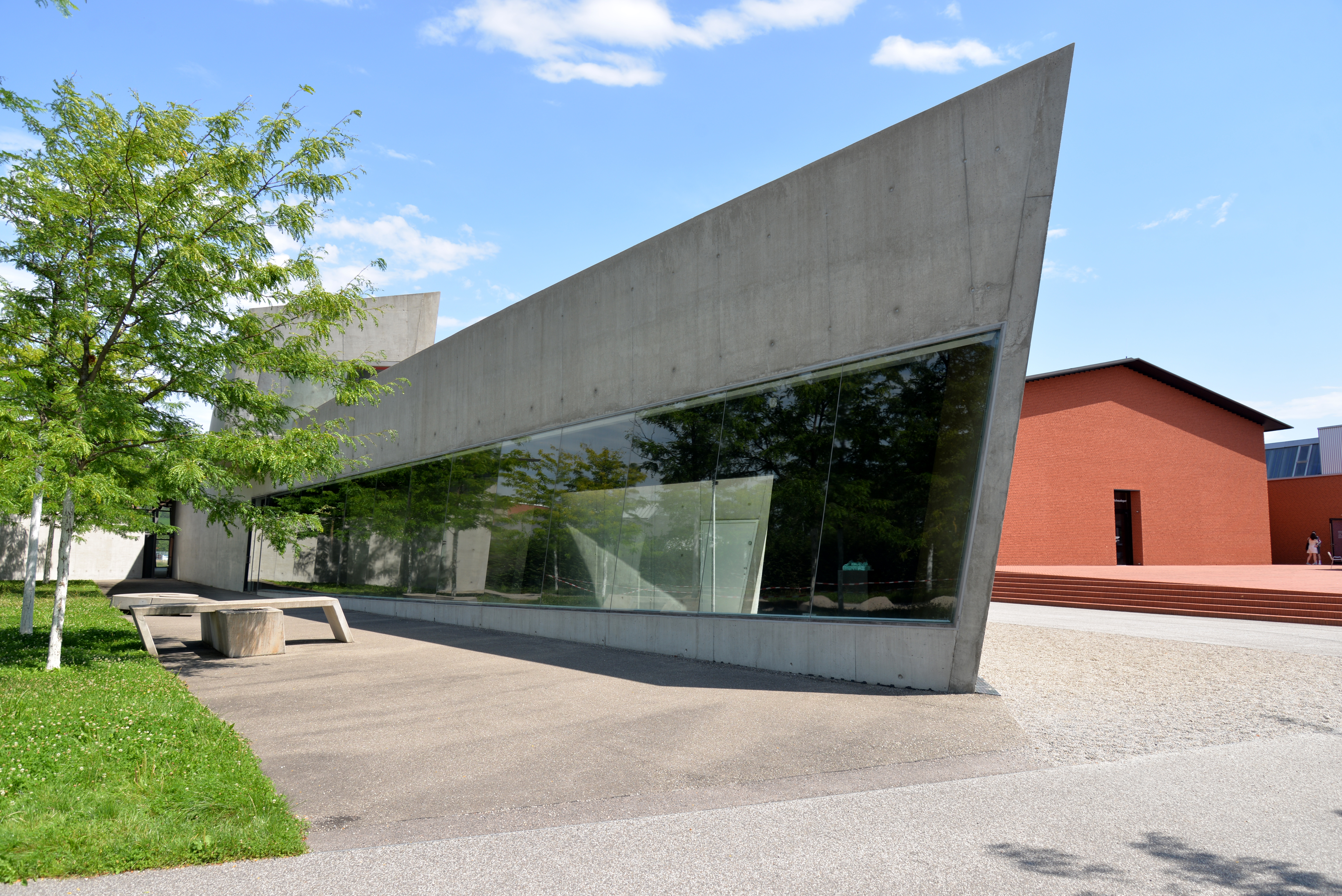
Vitra Fire Station in Weil am Rhein (1993). Hadid's first building complex.

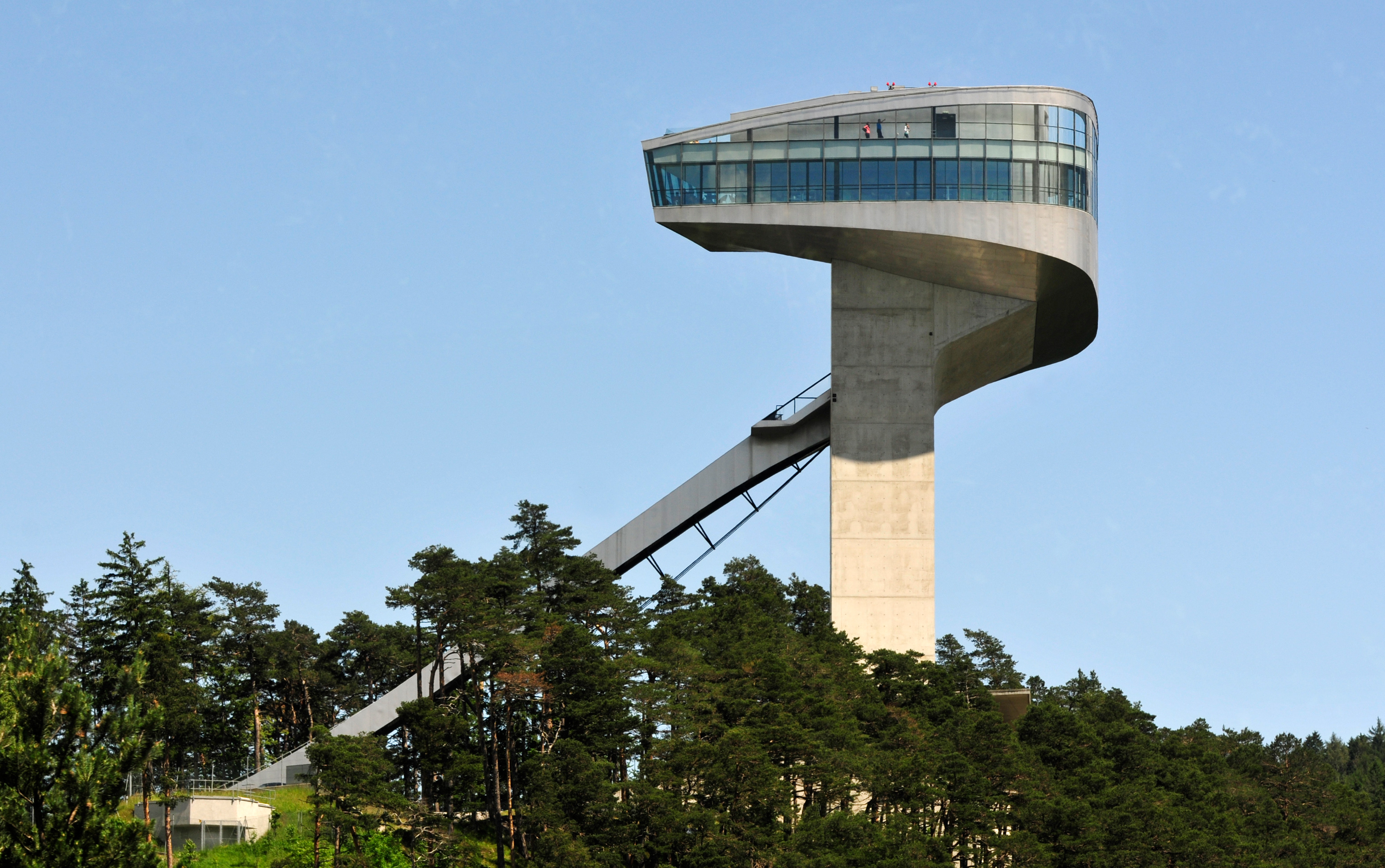
Bergisel Ski Jump in Innsbruck (2002)

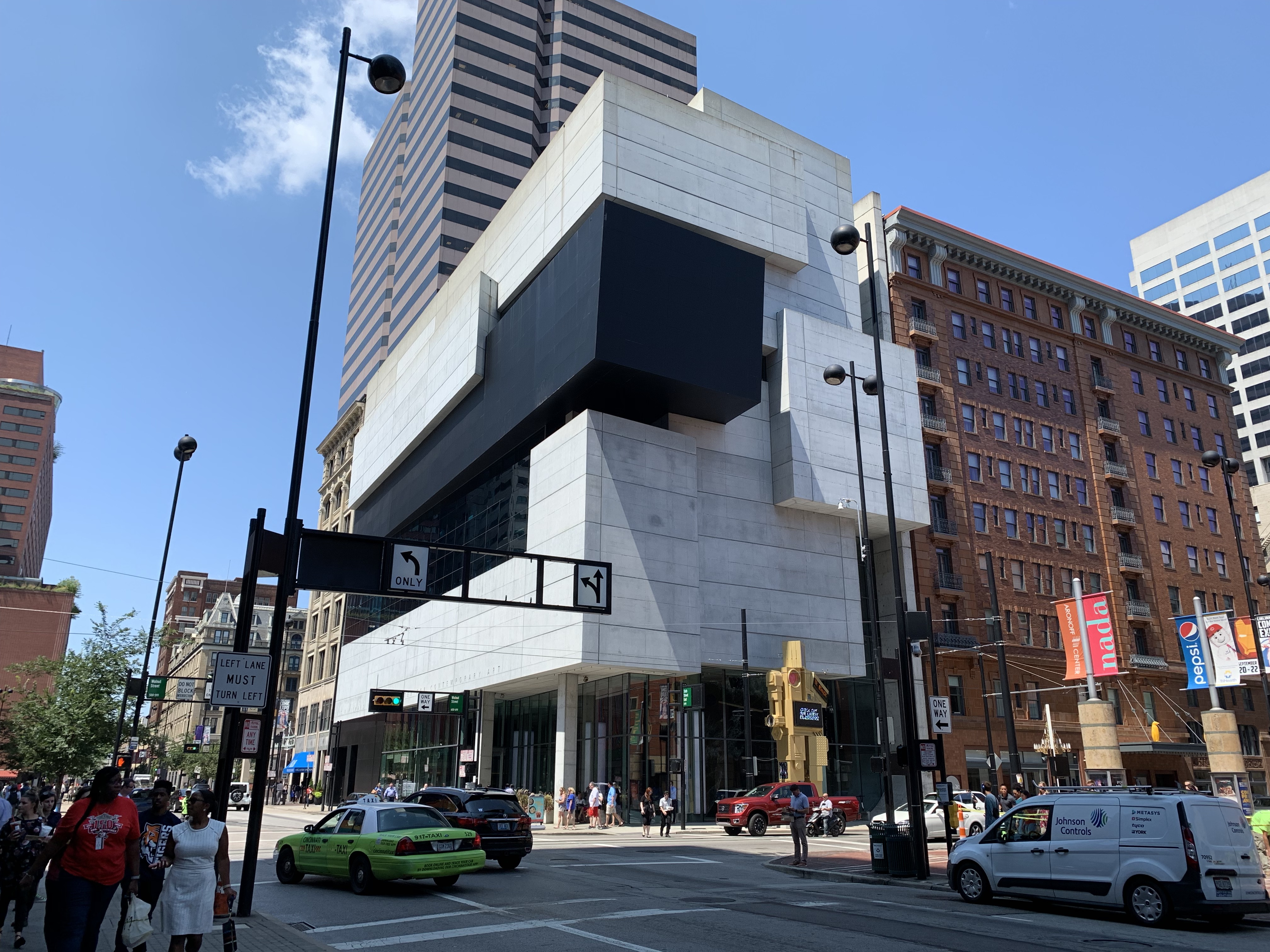
Contemporary Arts Center in Cincinnati, Ohio, US (2003)

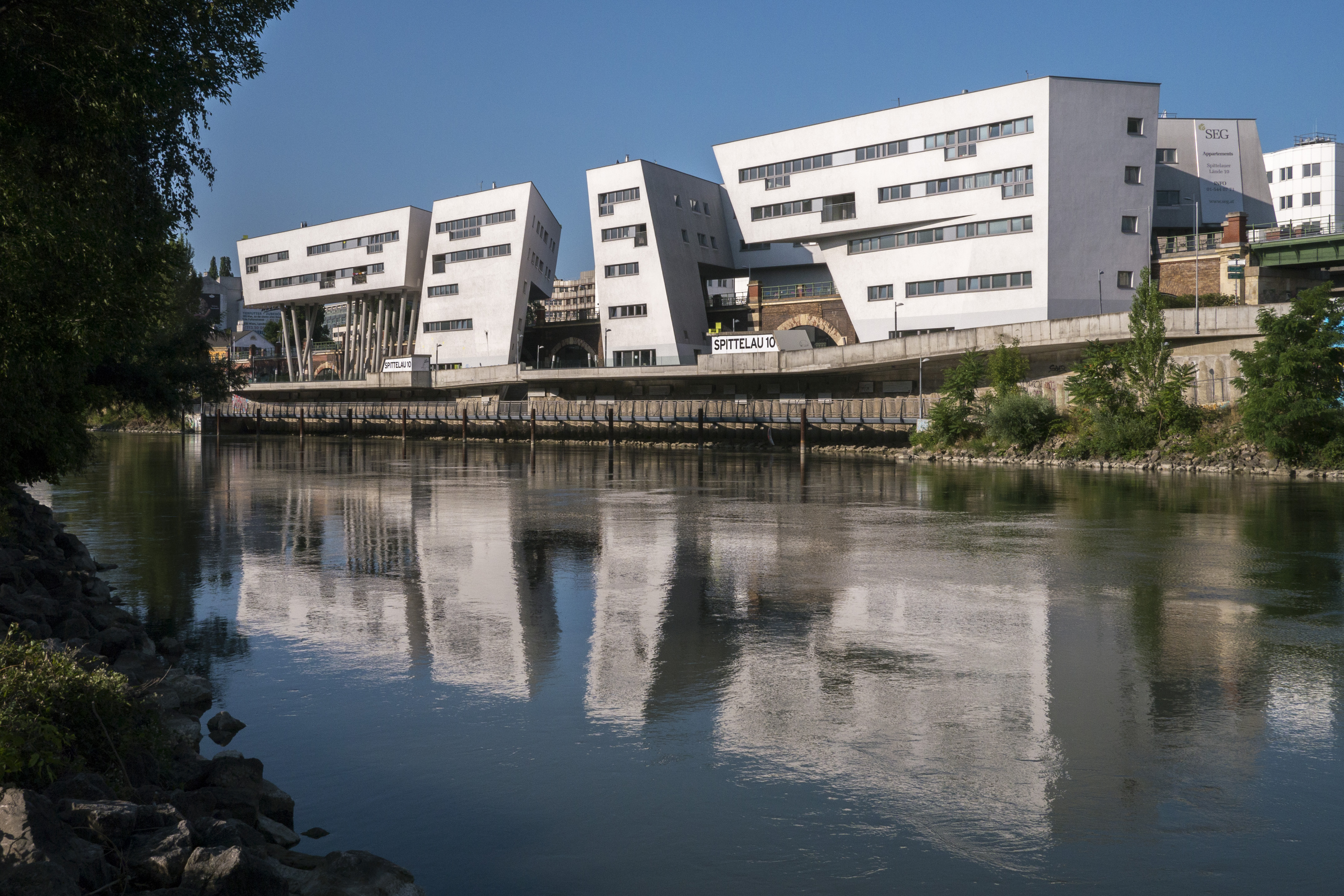
Spittelau Viaducts Housing Project in Vienna (2005)

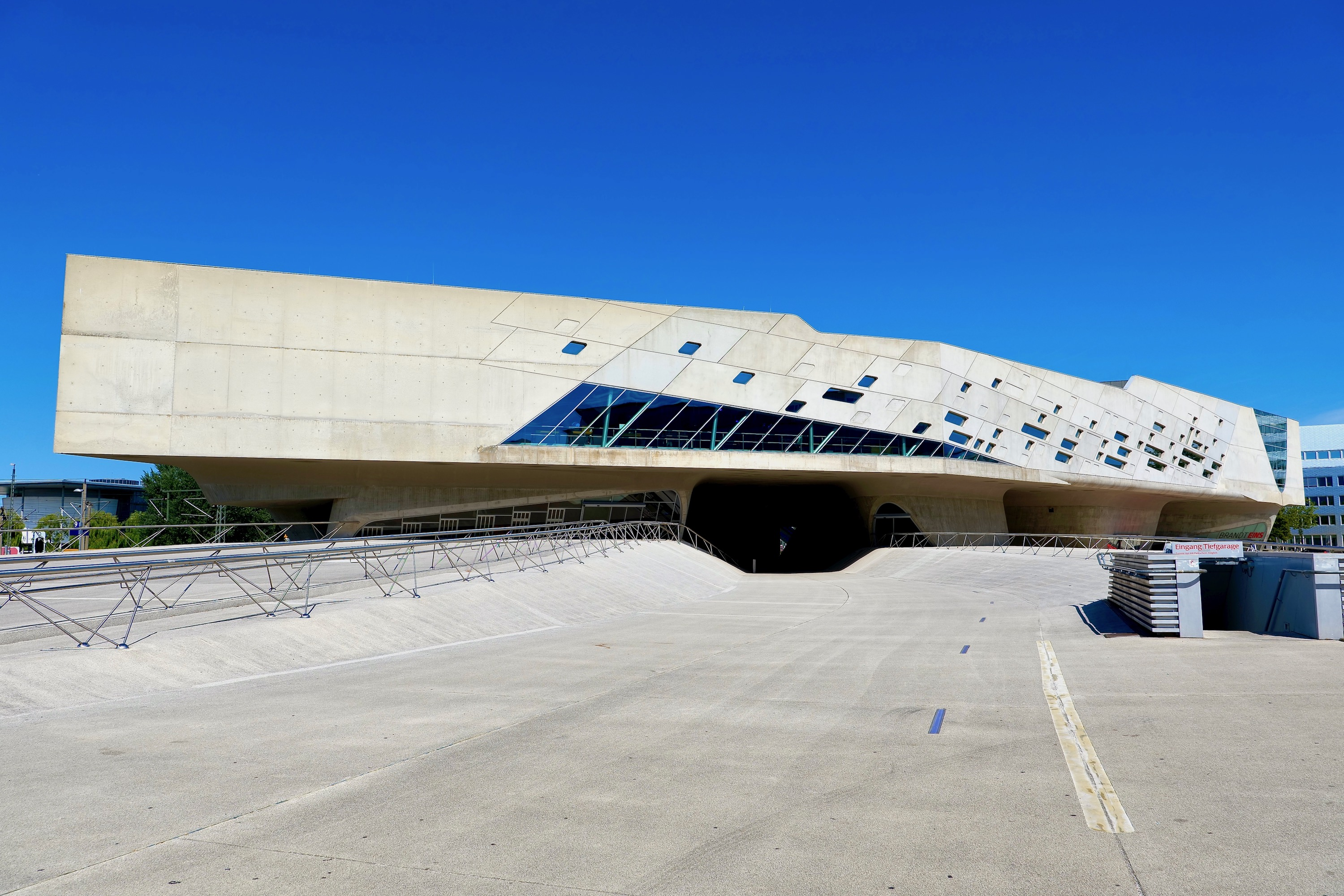
Phaeno Science Center in Wolfsburg (2005)

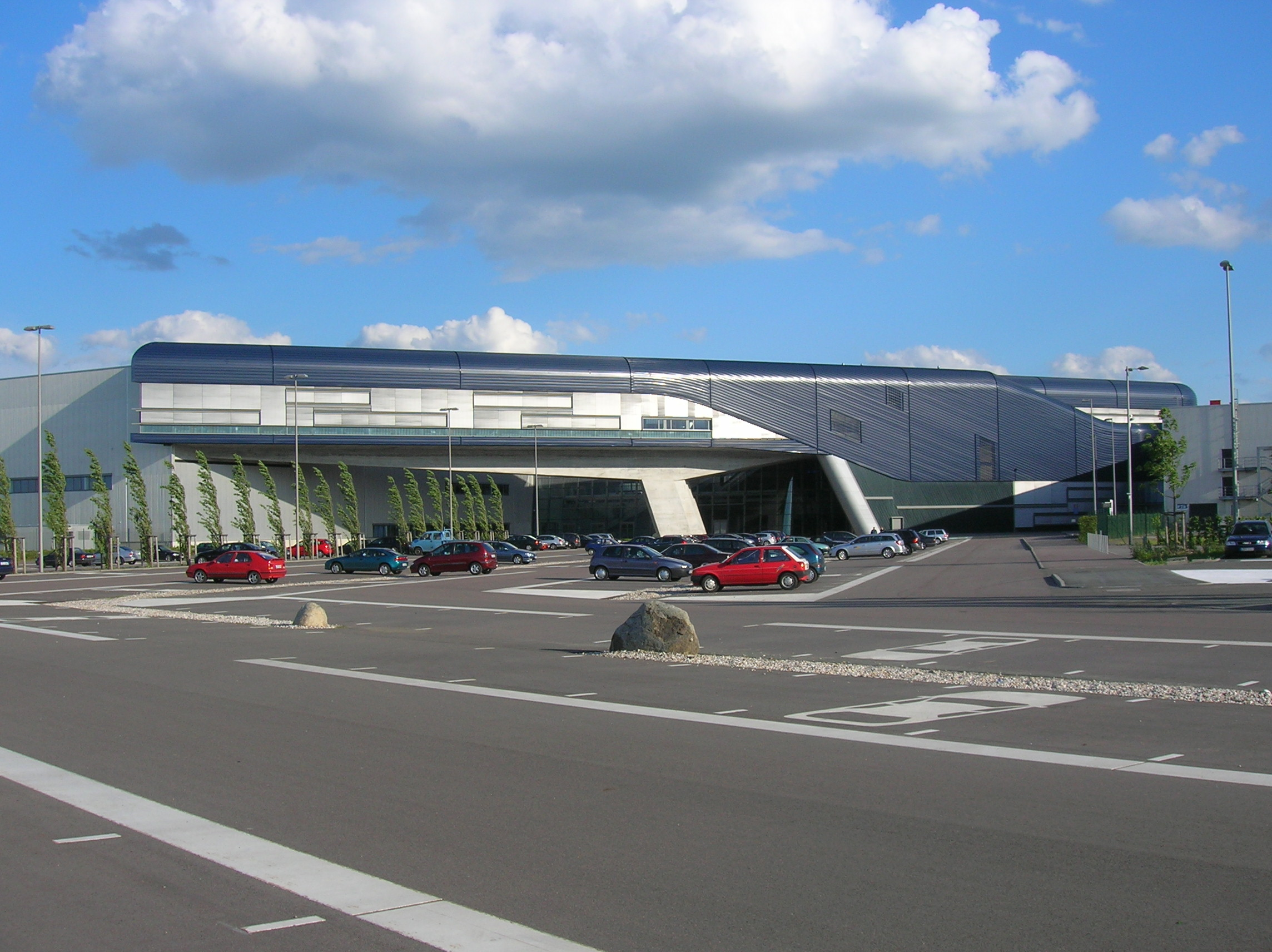
Administration building of BMW Factory in Leipzig (2005)

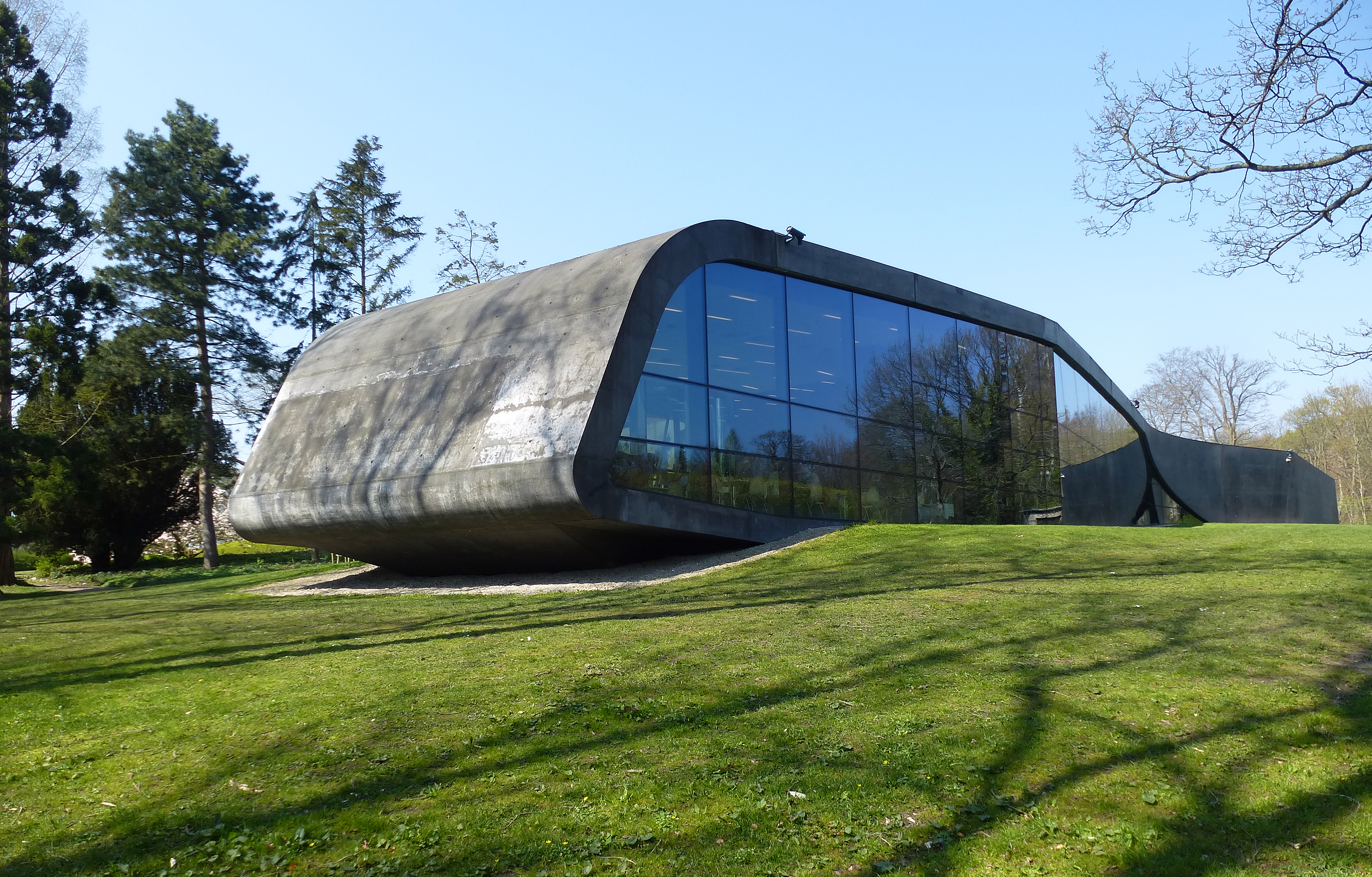
Extension of Ordrupgaard Museum in Copenhagen (2005)

=== Vitra Fire Station, Weil am Rhein, Germany (1991–1993) ===
One of her first clients was Rolf Fehlbaum, the president-director general of the Swiss furniture firm Vitra, and later, from 2004 to 2010, a member of the jury for the prestigious Pritzker Architecture Prize. In 1989, Fehlbaum had invited Frank Gehry, then little-known, to build a design museum at the Vitra factory in Weil-am-Rhein. In 1993, he invited Hadid to design a small fire station for the factory. Her design, made of raw concrete and glass, was a sculptural work composed of sharp diagonal forms colliding together in the centre. The design plans appeared in architecture magazines before construction. When completed, it only served as a fire station for a short period of time, as Weil am Rhein soon opened their own fire station. It became an exhibit space instead, and is now on display with the works of Gehry and other well-known architects. It was the launching pad of her architectural career.

=== Bergisel Ski Jump, Innsbruck, Austria (1999–2002) ===
Hadid designed a public housing estate in Berlin (1986–1993) and organised an exhibition, "The Great Utopia" (1992), at the Guggenheim Museum in New York. Her next major project was a ski jump at Bergisel, in Innsbruck Austria. The old ski jump, built in 1926, had been used in the 1964 and 1976 Winter Olympics. The new structure was to contain not only a ski jump, but also a cafe with 150 seats offering a 360-degree view of the mountains. Hadid had to fight against traditionalists and against time; the project had to be completed in one year, before the next international competition. Her design is 48 metres high and rests on a base seven metres by seven metres. She described it as "an organic hybrid", a cross between a bridge and a tower, which by its form gives a sense of movement and speed.

=== Contemporary Arts Center, Cincinnati, Ohio, United States (1997–2003) ===
At the end of the 1990s, her career began to gather momentum, as she won commissions for two museums and a large industrial building. She competed against Rem Koolhaas and other well-known architects for the design of the Contemporary Arts Center in Cincinnati, Ohio (1997–2003). She won, and became the first woman to design an art museum in the United States. At 8,500 square metres, the museum was not huge, and her design did not have the flamboyance of the Guggenheim Bilbao of Frank Gehry, built at the same time. But the project demonstrated Hadid's ability to use architectural forms to create interior drama, including its central element, a 30-metre long black stairway that passes between massive curving and angular concrete walls.

=== Spittelau Viaducts Housing Project, Vienna, Austria (1994–2005) ===
In 1994, Hadid was commissioned by the city of Vienna to design and construct a three-part scheme for the urban redevelopment of an area adjacent to the Danube Canal. Situated along the Spittelauer Lände, the series of buildings interact with and cross over the railway viaduct by Viennese Modernist architect Otto Wagner, a protected structure. In its initial design consisting of five buildings, the mixed-use scheme, described as a "sculpture-like overbuilding" of the historic Stadtbahn railway, was designed by Hadid's practice ZHA. Hadid, together with British architectural artist Brian Clarke, developed an unexecuted collaborative proposal for the project that incorporated integral artworks by Clarke as part of the Neo-Futurist structures, with interrelated glass mosaic and traditionally-leaded stained glass forming part of the cladding and fenestration of the complex. Clarke developed a new type of mouth-blown glass for the scheme, which he christened 'Zaha-Glas'. Later reduced to three buildings, the project, which experienced delays in construction, was completed in 2006, without the artwork.

=== Phaeno Science Center, Wolfsburg, Germany (2000–2005) ===
In 2000, she won an international competition for the Phaeno Science Center, in Wolfsburg, Germany (2002–2005). The new museum was only a little larger than the Cincinnati Museum, with 9,000 square metres of space, but the plan was much more ambitious. It was similar in concept to the buildings of Le Corbusier, raised up seven metres on concrete pylons. Unlike Corbusier's buildings, she planned for the space under the building to be filled with activity, and each of the 10 massive inverted cone-shaped columns that hold up the building contains a cafe, a shop, or a museum entrance. The tilting columns reach up through the building and also support the roof. The museum structure resembles an enormous ship, with sloping walls and asymmetric scatterings of windows, and the interior, with its angular columns and exposed steel roof framework, gives the illusion of being inside a working vessel or laboratory.

=== BMW Administration Building, Leipzig, Germany (2001–2005) ===
In 2002, she won the competition to design a new administrative building for the factory of the auto manufacturer BMW in Leipzig, Germany. The three assembly buildings adjoining it were designed by other architects; her building served as the entrance and what she called the "nerve centre" of the complex. As with the Phaeno Science Center, the building is hoisted above street level on leaning concrete pylons. The interior contains a series of levels and floors which seem to cascade, sheltered by tilting concrete beams and a roof supported by steel beams in the shape of an 'H'. The open interior inside was intended, she wrote, to avoid "the traditional segregation of working groups" and to show the "global transparence of the internal organisation" of the enterprise, and wrote that she had given particular attention to the parking lot in front of the building, with the intent, she wrote, of "transforming it into a dynamic spectacle of its own".

=== Ordrupgaard Museum extension, Copenhagen, Denmark (2001–2005) ===
In 2001, she began another museum project, an extension of the Ordrupgaard Museum near Copenhagen, Denmark, a museum featuring a collection of 19th century French and Danish art in the 19th-century mansion of its collector. The new building is 87 metres long and 20 metres wide, and is connected by a five-metre wide passage to the old museum. There are no right angles – only diagonals – in the concrete shell of the museum. The floor-to-ceiling glass walls of the gallery make the garden the backdrop of the exhibits.

=== Pritzker Architecture Prize ===
In 2004, she won the Pritzker Architecture Prize, the most prestigious award in architecture, though she had only completed four buildings – the Vitra Fire Station, the Ski Lift in Innsbruck Austria, the Car Park and Terminus Hoenheim North in France, and the Contemporary Art Center in Cincinnati. In making the announcement, Thomas Pritzker, the head of the jury, announced: "Although her body of work is relatively small, she has achieved great acclaim and her energy and ideas show even greater promise for the future."

== Major projects (2006–2010) ==
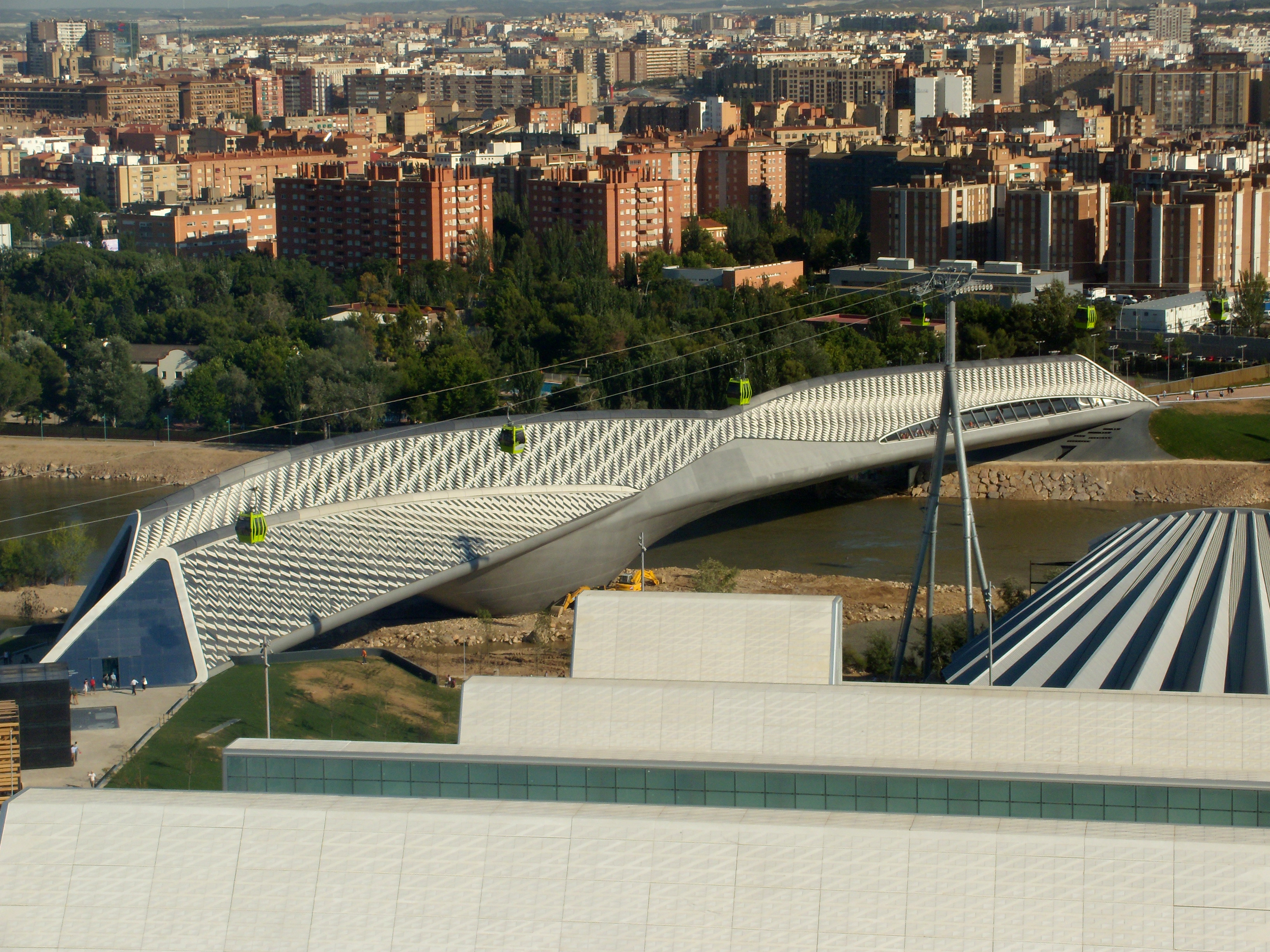
Bridge Pavilion in Zaragoza (2008)

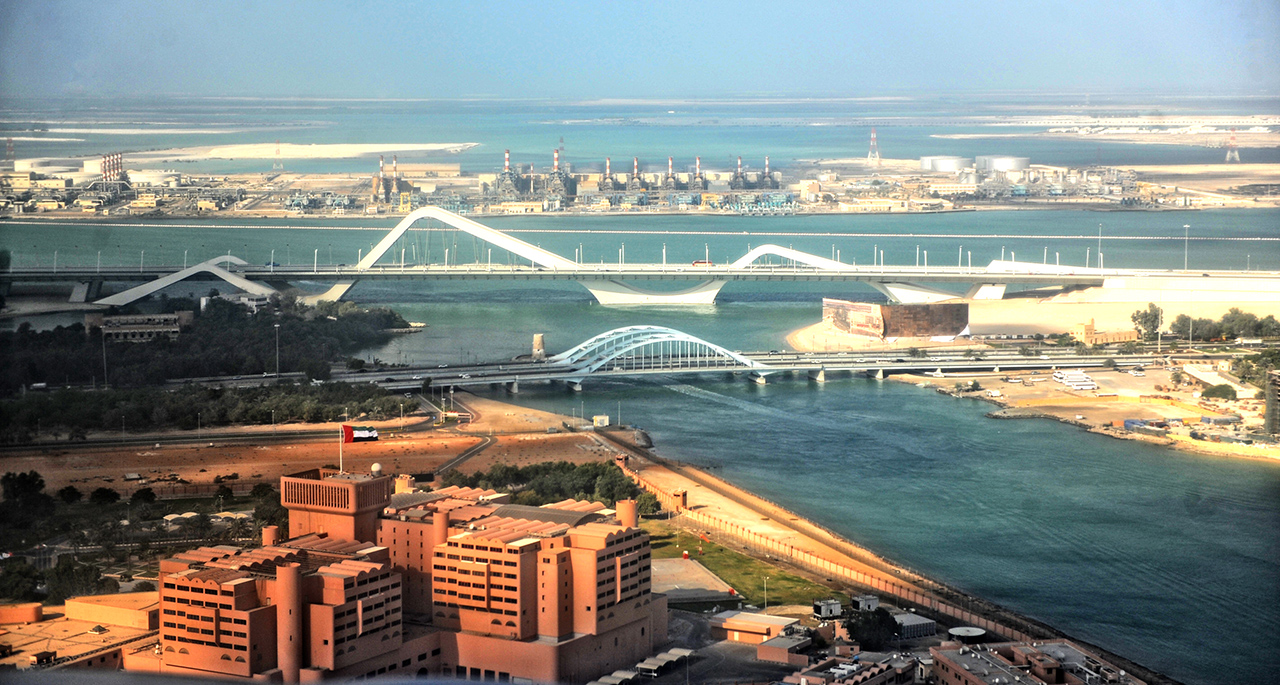
Sheikh Zayed Bridge in Abu Dhabi (2010)

MAXXI museum in Rome (2010)

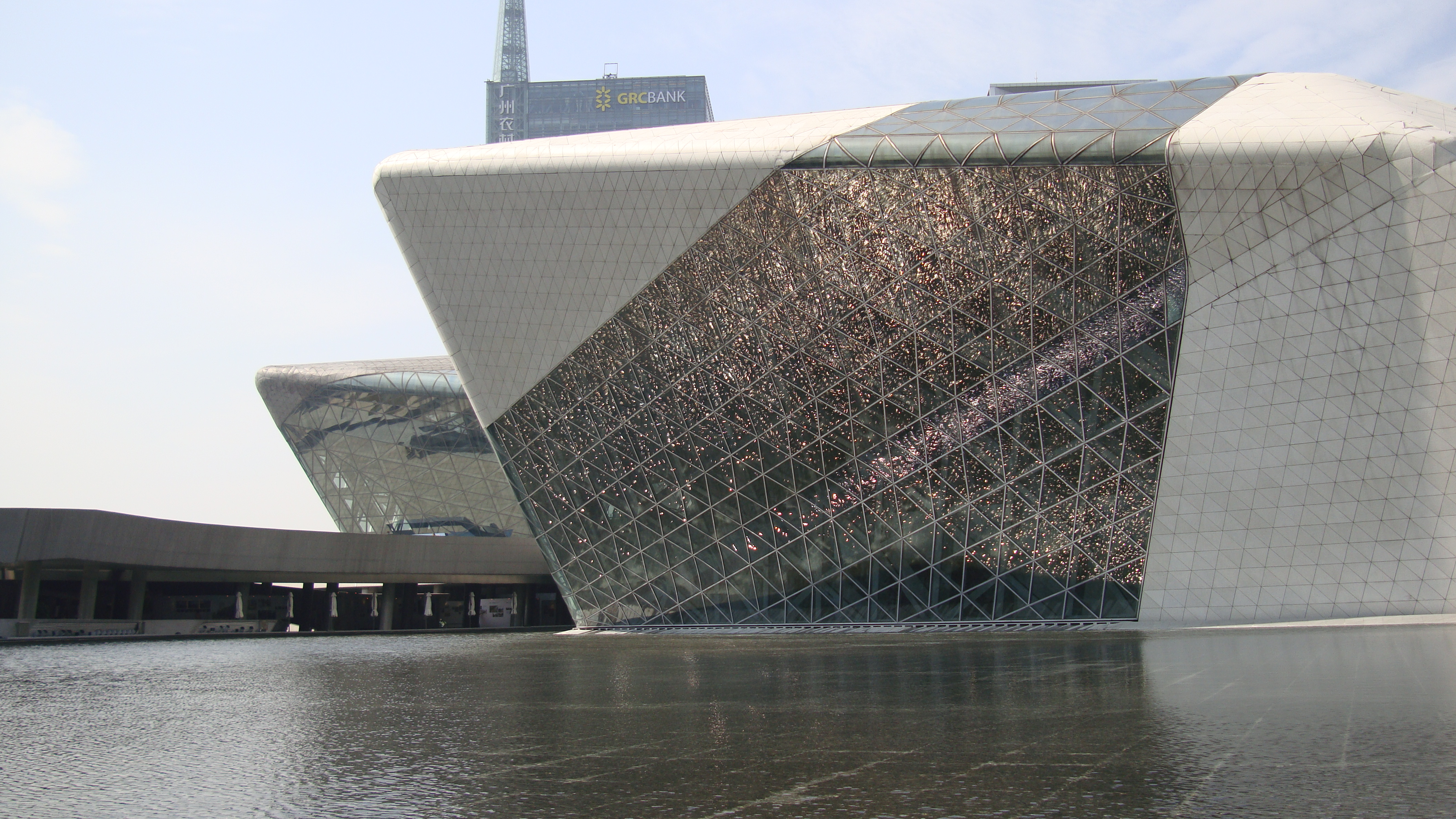
Guangzhou Opera House in Guangzhou (2010)

=== Zaragoza Bridge Pavilion, Zaragoza, Spain (2005–2008) ===
Between 1997 and 2010, Hadid ventured into the engineers' domain of bridge construction, a field also occupied by other top architects including Norman Foster and Santiago Calatrava. Between 2005 and 2008, she designed and built the Bridge-Pavilion of Zaragoza, which was both an exhibit hall and a bridge, created for Expo 2008, an event on the themes of water and durable development. The concrete bridge span on which the pavilion rests is 85 metres long, as measured from the Exposition site to an island in the Ebro River. The bridge carries or is attached to four tunnel-like exhibition spaces she termed "pods", which spread onto the island, for a total length of 275 metres. The pods are covered with a skin of 26,000 triangular shingles, many of which open to let in air and light. The bridge-pavilion, characteristic of her designs and buildings of the period, is composed entirely of diagonal slopes and curves, with no right-angles of orthogonal forms. By its curving shape and low profile, the bridge-pavilion fits smoothly into the grassy landscape along the river.

=== Sheikh Zayed Bridge, Abu Dhabi, United Arab Emirates (1997–2010) ===
Between 1997 and 2010, she constructed a much more ambitious bridge, the Sheikh Zayed Bridge, which honors Sheikh Zayed bin Sultan Al Nahyan, between the island of Abu Dhabi and the mainland of Abu Dhabi, as well as to the Abu Dhabi International Airport. Both the design of the bridge and the lighting, consisting of gradually changing colours, were designed to give the impression of movement. The silhouette of the bridge is a wave, with a principal arch 235 metres long, standing 60 metres above the water. The total span of four lanes is 842 metres (2,762 feet) long, and also includes pedestrian walkways. The bridge was inaugurated on 25 November 2010, by the late UAE President Sheikh Khalifa. The ceremony was also attended by Queen Elizabeth II of the United Kingdom, marking her second state visit to the UAE. Traffic on the bridge commenced three days following the opening ceremony.

=== National Museum of Arts of the 21st Century (MAXXI), Rome, Italy (1998–2010) ===
The National Museum of Arts of the 21st Century (MAXXI for short), in Rome, was designed and built between 1998 and 2010. The main theme of its architecture is the sense of movement; Everything in the structure seems to be moving and flowing. Hadid took inspiration from the surrounding orthogonal site grids to determine the overall form. The facade belongs to her earlier period, with smooth curving white walls and an austere black and white colour scheme. The building is perched on groups of five very thin pylons, and one gallery with a glass face precariously overhangs the plaza in front of the museum, creating shade. Rowan Moore of The Guardian of London described its form as "bending oblong tubes, overlapping, intersecting and piling over each other. The imagery is of flow and movement and it resembles a demented piece of transport architecture. Inside, black steel stairs and bridges, their undersides glowing with white light, fly across a void. They take you off to the galleries, which are themselves works of frozen motion. The design is intended to generate what Hadid called "confluence, interference and turbulence",

=== Guangzhou Opera House, Guangzhou, China (2003–2010) ===
In 2002 Hadid won an international competition for her first project in China. The Guangzhou Opera House is located in a new business district of the city, with a new 103-storey glass tower behind it. It covers 70,000 square metres and was built at cost of US$300 million. The complex comprises an 1,800-seat theatre, a multipurpose theatre, entry hall, and salon. A covered pathway with restaurants and shops separates the two main structures. This building, like several of her later buildings, was inspired by natural earth forms; the architect herself referred to it as the "two pebbles". It appears akin to two giant smooth-edged boulders faced with 75,000 panels of polished granite and glass. Edwin Heathcote, writing for the Financial Times, noted Hadid's concentration on how her design could transform the urban landscape of Guangzhou, as the building rose as the centre of the new business area. He wrote in 2011 that Hadid "produced a building that seems to suck the surrounding landscape into a vortex of movement and swirling space... appears both as alien object in a landscape of incomprehensible vastness (and often overwhelming banality), and as an extrusion of the peculiar nature of this landscape." Nicolai Ourousoff, architecture critic of the New York Times, wrote that "stepping into the main hall is like entering the soft insides of an oyster...The concave ceiling is pierced by thousands of little lights—it looks like you're sitting under the dome of a clear night sky." Ourousoff noted that the finished building had construction problems: many of the granite tiles on the exterior had to be replaced, and the plaster and other interior work was poorly done by the inexperienced workers, but he praised Hadid's ability "to convey a sense of bodies in motion" and called the building "a Chinese gem that elevates its setting."

== Major projects (2011–2012) ==
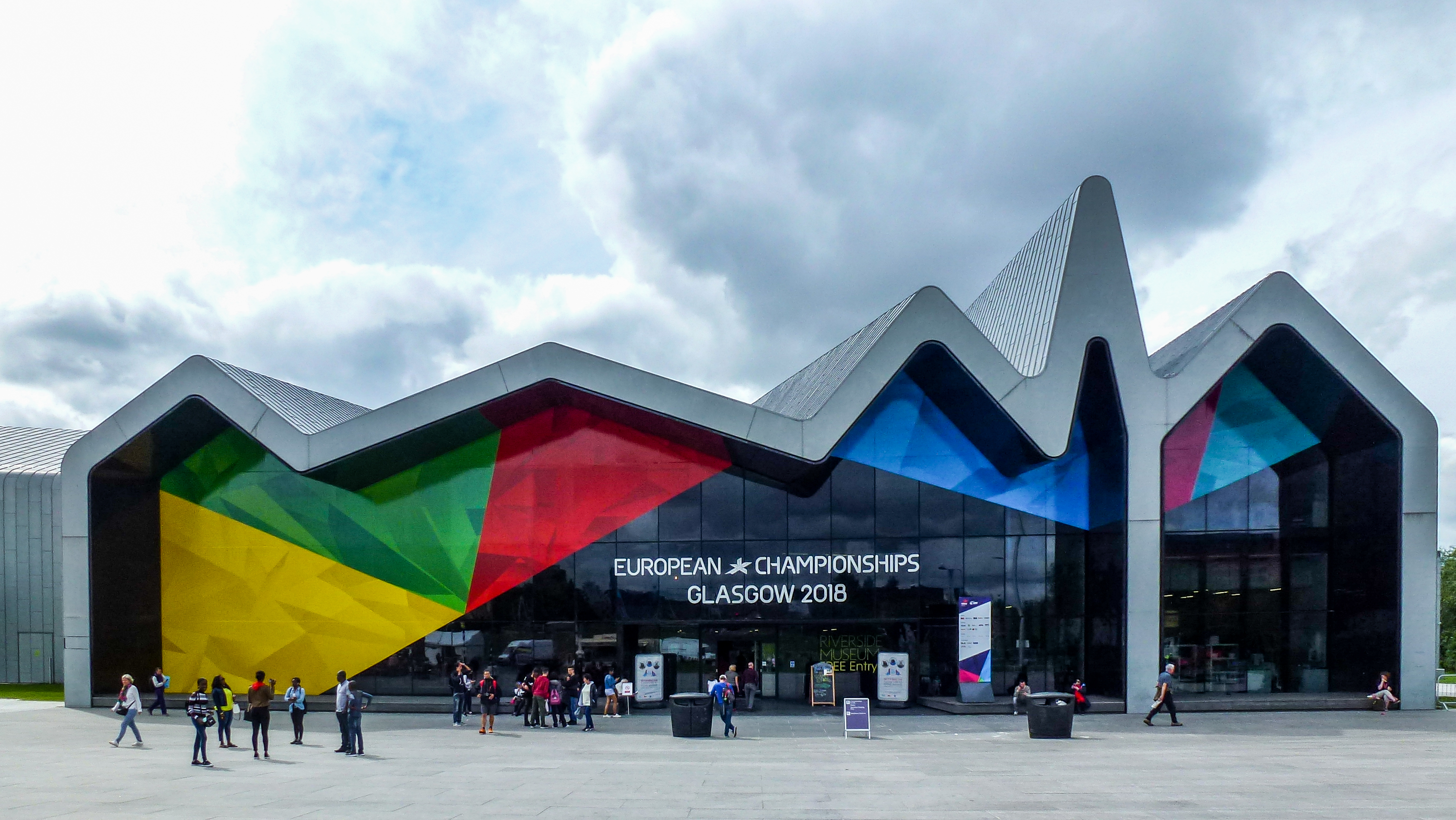
Riverside Museum in Glasgow (2011)

CMA CGM Tower in Marseille (2011)

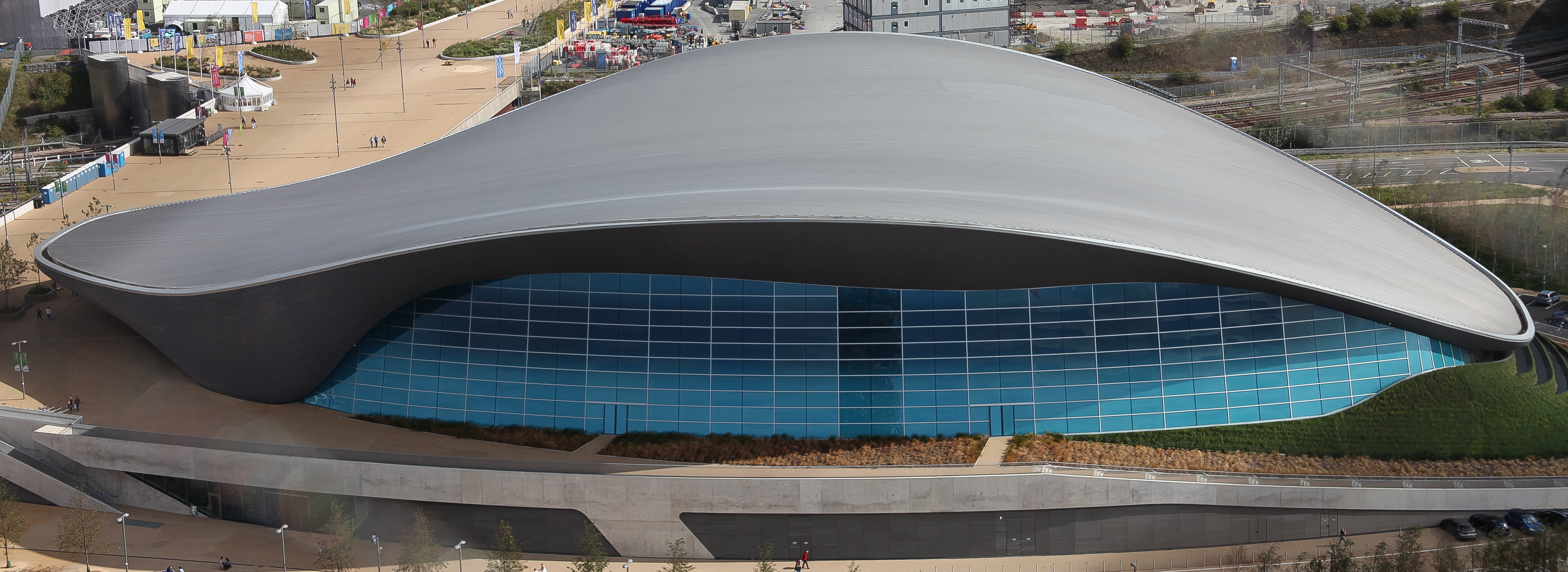
London Aquatics Centre in London (2012)

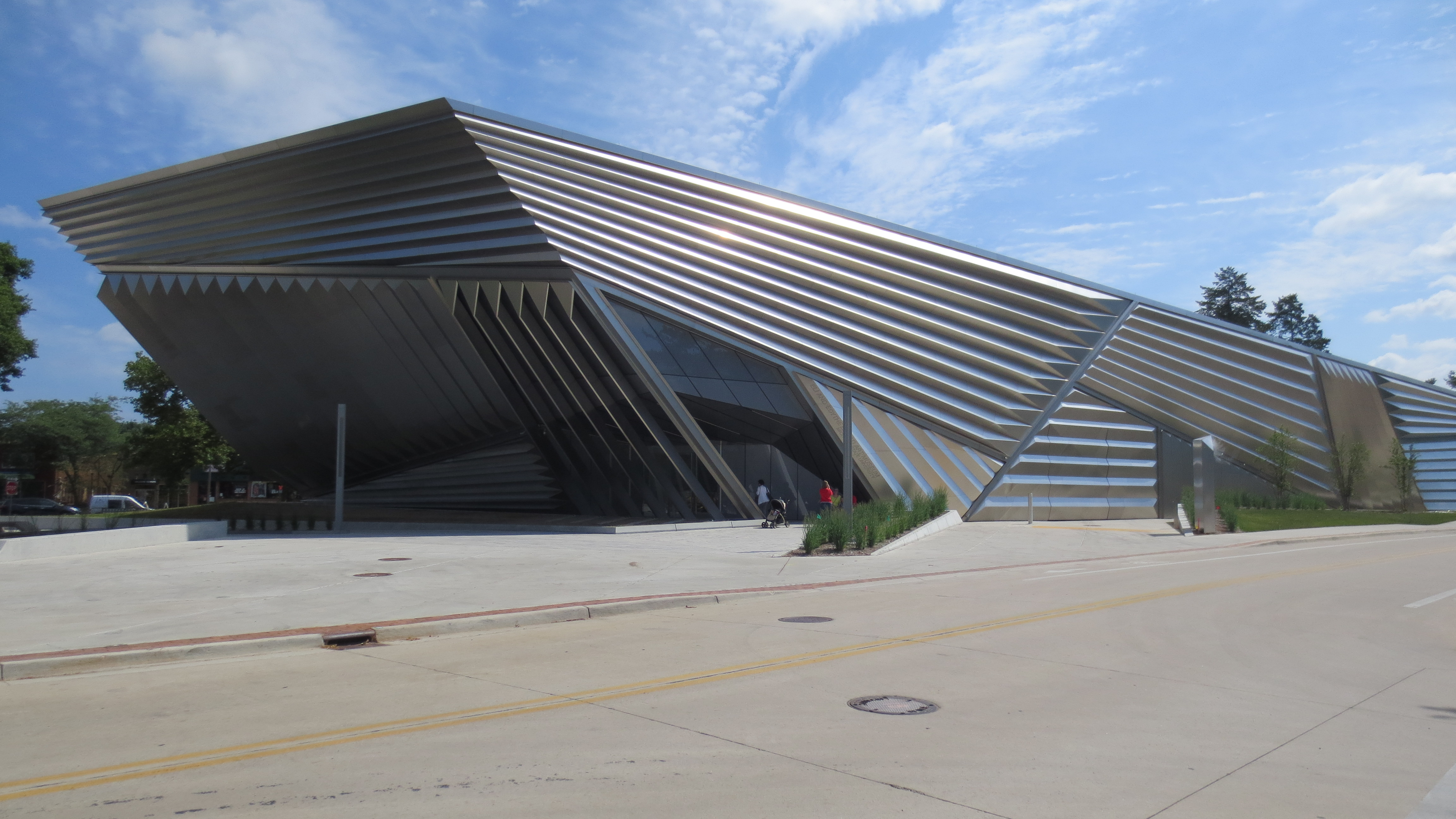
Broad Art Museum in East Lansing, Michigan, US (2012)

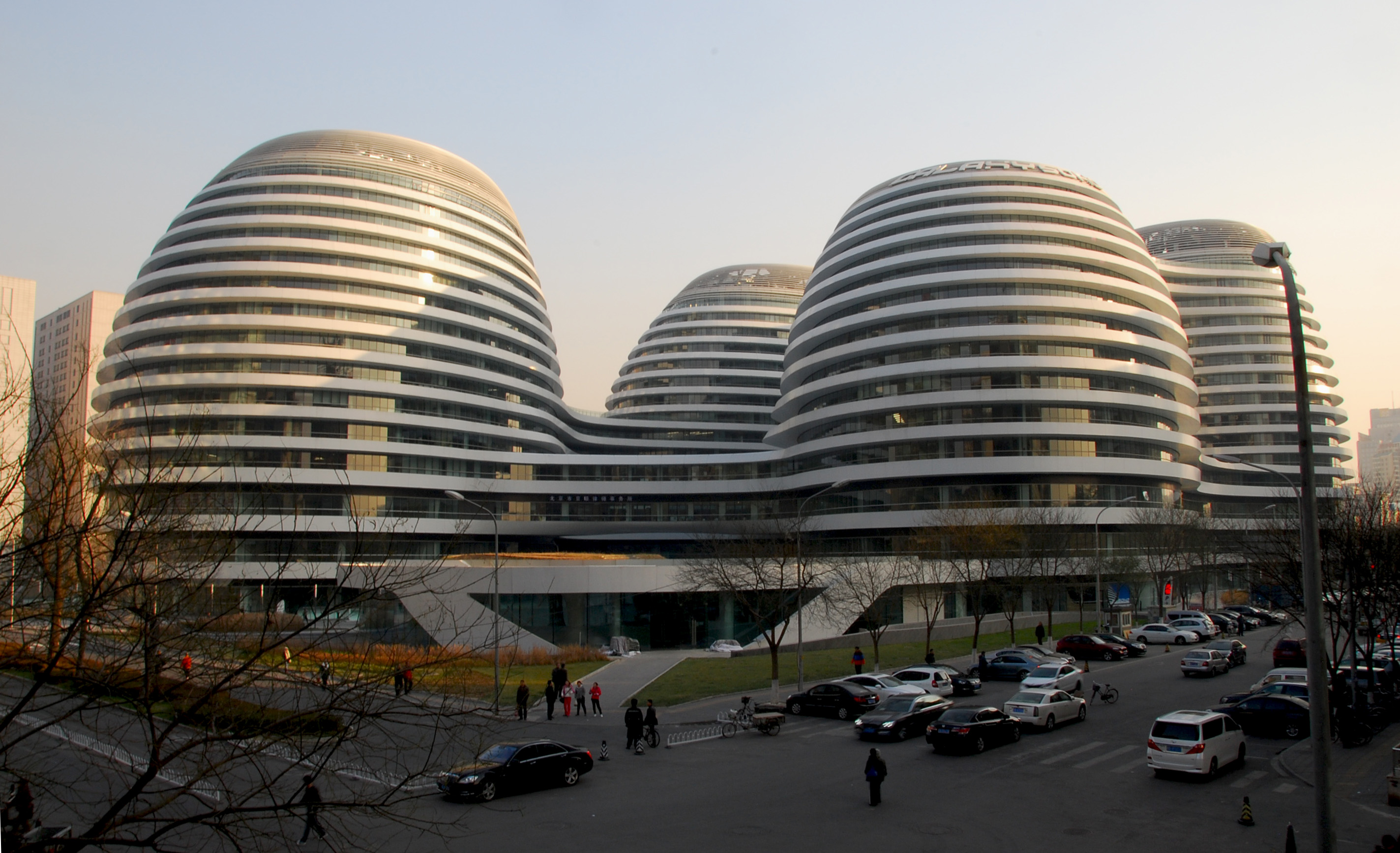
Galaxy SOHO in Beijing (2012)

=== Riverside Museum, Glasgow, Scotland, United Kingdom (2004–2011) ===
The Riverside Museum (2004–2011), on the banks of the River Clyde Glasgow, Scotland, houses the Glasgow Museum of Transport. Hadid described the 10,000-square metre building, with 7,000 square metres of gallery space, as "a wave", "folds in movement", and "a shed in the form of a tunnel, open at the extreme ends, one end toward the city and the other toward the Clyde." Like many of her buildings, the whole form is only perceived when viewed from above. The facades are covered with zinc plates, and the roofline has a series of peaks and angles. The interior galleries caused some controversy; visitors who came to see the collection of historic automobiles found that they are mounted on the walls, high overhead, so it is impossible to look into them. Rowan Moore of The Guardian of London wrote: "Obviously the space is about movement...Outside it is, typologically, a supermarket, being a big thing in a parking lot that is seeking to attract you in...It has enigma and majesty, but not friendliness."

=== CMA CGM Tower, Marseille, France (2006–2011) ===
Hadid's first built tower, the CMA CGM Headquarters in Marseille, France, is most immediately notable for its dual vertical form. According to Zaha Hadid Architects, "The curving profiles on the exterior facades work with the central core of the building, bringing a rigid frame and a sense of movement to this completely new typology of tower." The 94,000-square metre building, which resembles a ship's prow, is the highest in the town at 147 m and has a capacity of 2700 desks, an 800-seat company restaurant, a 190-seat auditorium, a maritime museum, a fitness room and training rooms.

=== London Olympics Aquatics Centre, London, United Kingdom (2005–2011) ===
Hadid described her Aquatics Centre for the 2012 Summer Olympics in London as "inspired by the fluid geometry of water in movement". The building covers three swimming pools, and seats 17,500 spectators at the two main pools. The roof, made of steel and aluminium and covered with wood on the inside, rests on just three supports; it is in the form of a parabolic arch that dips in the centre, with the two pools at either end. The seats are placed in bays beside the curving and outward-leaning walls of glass. At £269 million, the complex cost three times the original estimate, owing principally to the complexity of the roof. This was the subject of much comment when it was constructed, and it was the first 2012 Olympic building begun but the last to be finished. It was praised by architecture critics. Rowan Moore of The Guardian said that the roof "floats and undulates" and called the centre "the Olympics' most majestic space".

=== Broad Art Museum, Michigan State University, East Lansing, Michigan, United States (2007–2012) ===
The Broad Art Museum at Michigan State University in East Lansing, Michigan, Hadid's second project in the United States, has a space of 4,274 square metres, dedicated to contemporary art and modern art and an historical collection. The parallelogram-shaped building leans sharply and seems about to tip over. Hadid wrote that she designed the building so that its sloping pleated stainless steel facades would reflect the surrounding neighbourhood from different angles; the building continually changes colour depending upon the weather, the time of day and the angle of the sun. As Hadid commented, the building "awakens curiosity without ever truly revealing its contents". Elaine Glusac of The New York Times wrote that the architecture of the new museum "radicalizes the streetscape". The Museum was used in a scene of the 2016 Batman vs. Superman movie.

=== Galaxy SOHO, Beijing, China (2008–2012) ===
Many of Hadid's later major works are found in Asia. The Galaxy SOHO in Beijing, China (2008–2012) is a combination of offices and a commercial centre in the heart of Beijing with a total of 332,857 square metres, composed of four different ovoid glass-capped buildings joined by multiple curving passageways on different levels. Hadid explained, "the interior spaces follow the same coherent formal logic of continual curvilinearity." The complex, like most of her buildings, gives the impression that every part of them is in motion.

== Last completed major projects (2013–2016) ==
Heydar Aliyev Center in Baku (2013)

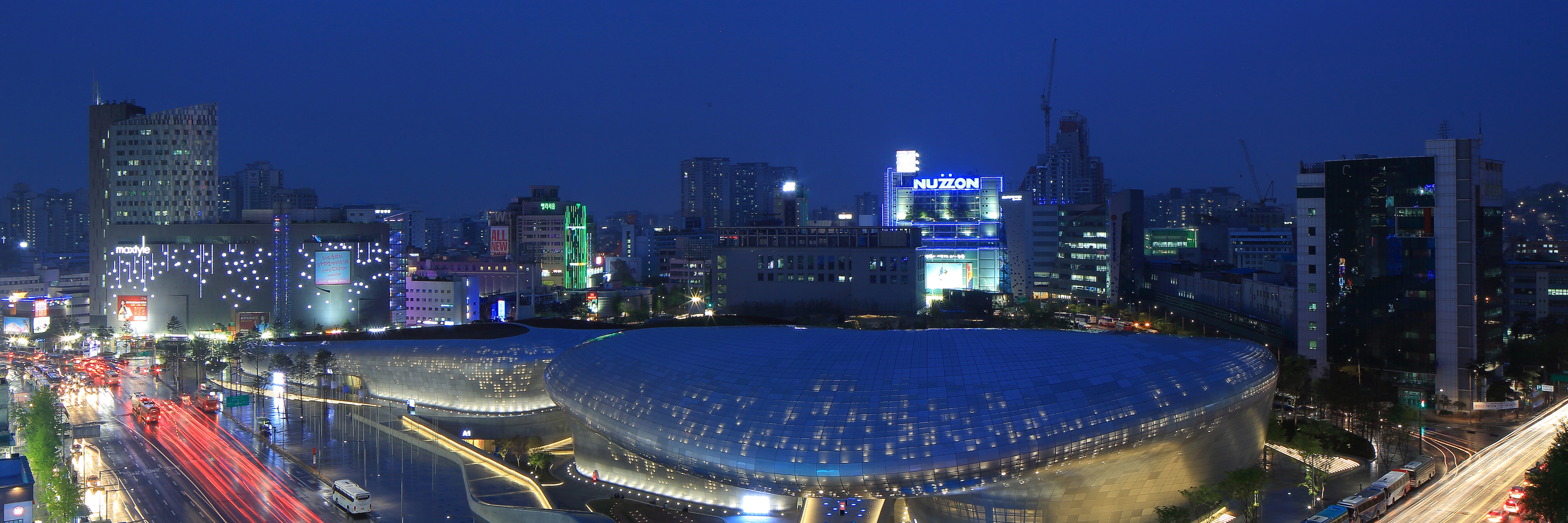
Dongdaemun Design Plaza in Seoul (2013)

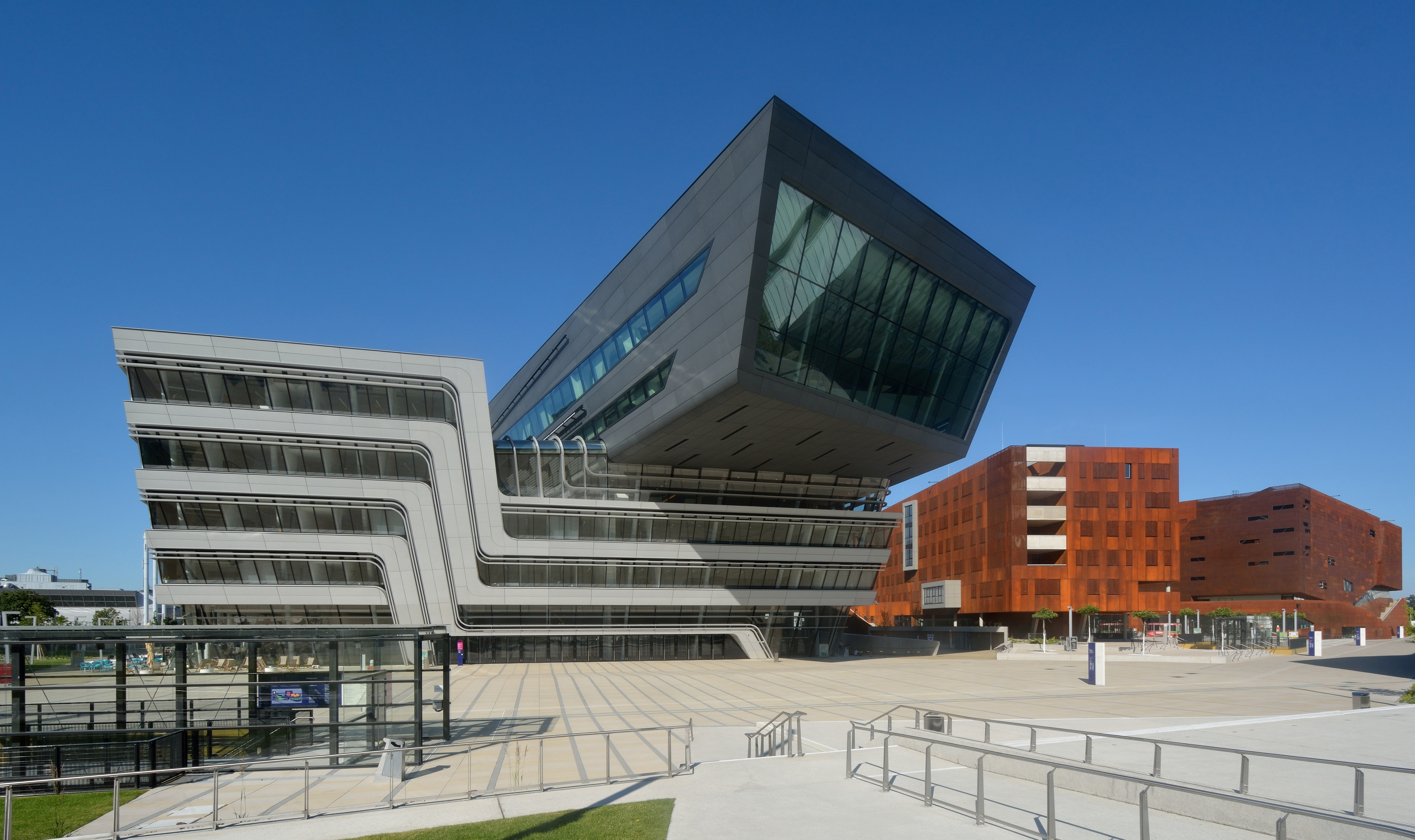
Vienna University of Economics and Business Library and Learning Center in Vienna (2013)

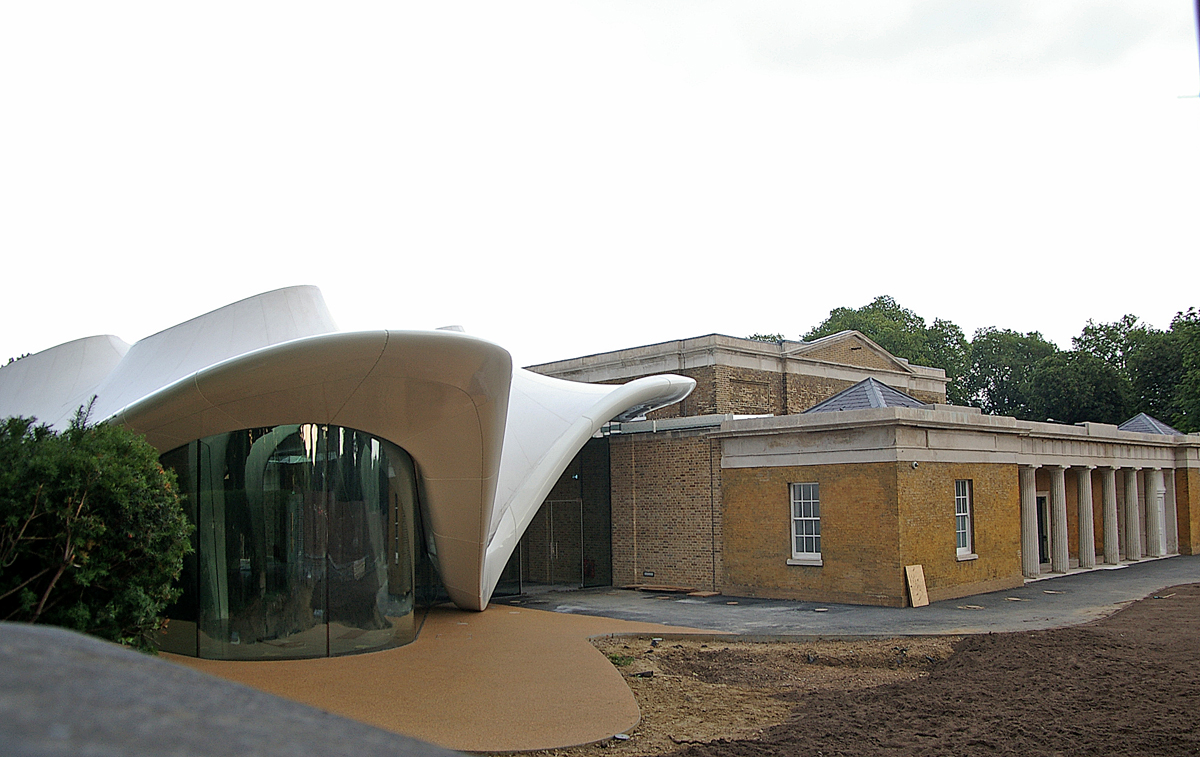
Serpentine North in London (2013)

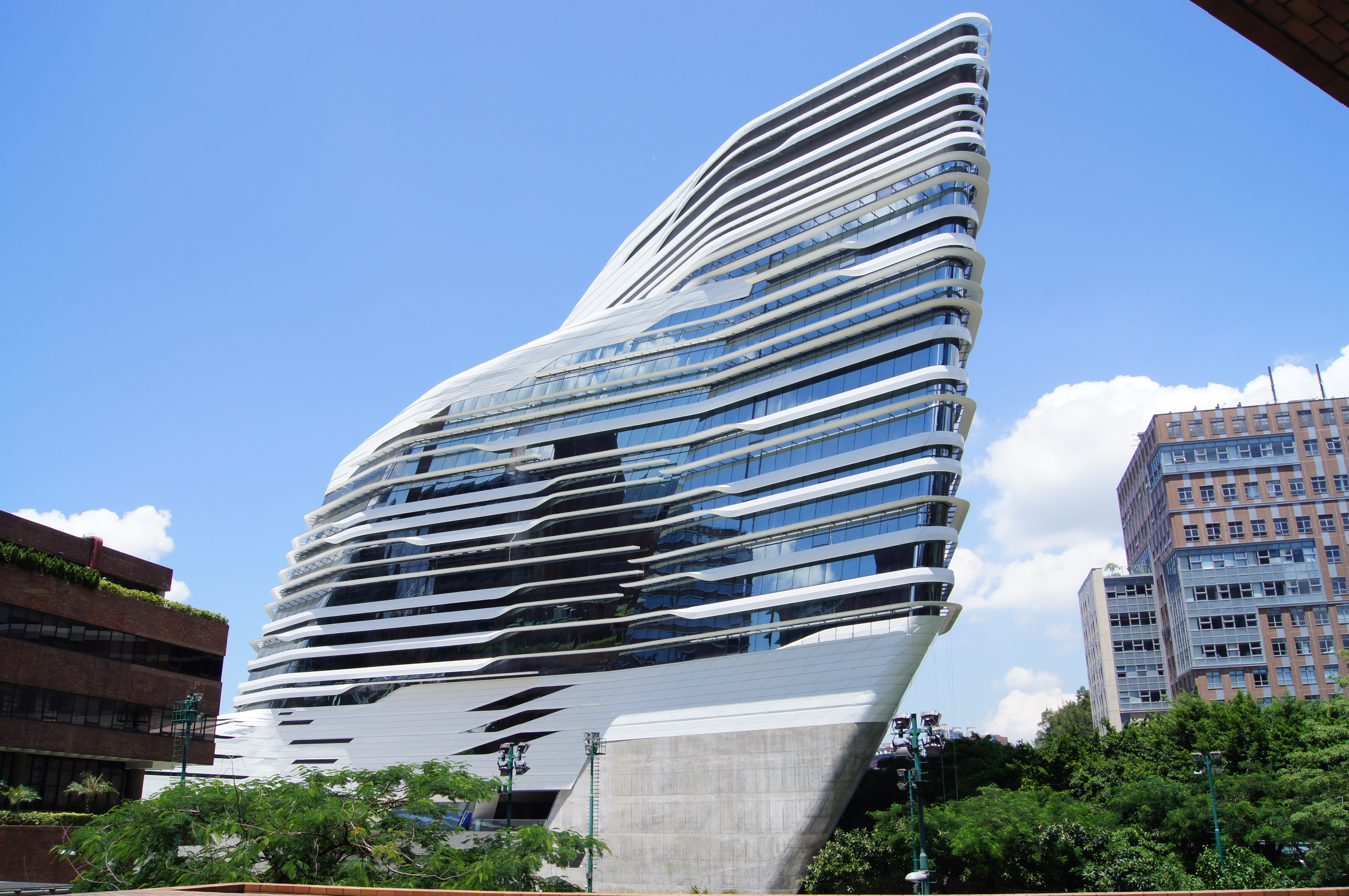
Jockey Club Innovation Tower at the Hong Kong Polytechnic University (2007–2014)

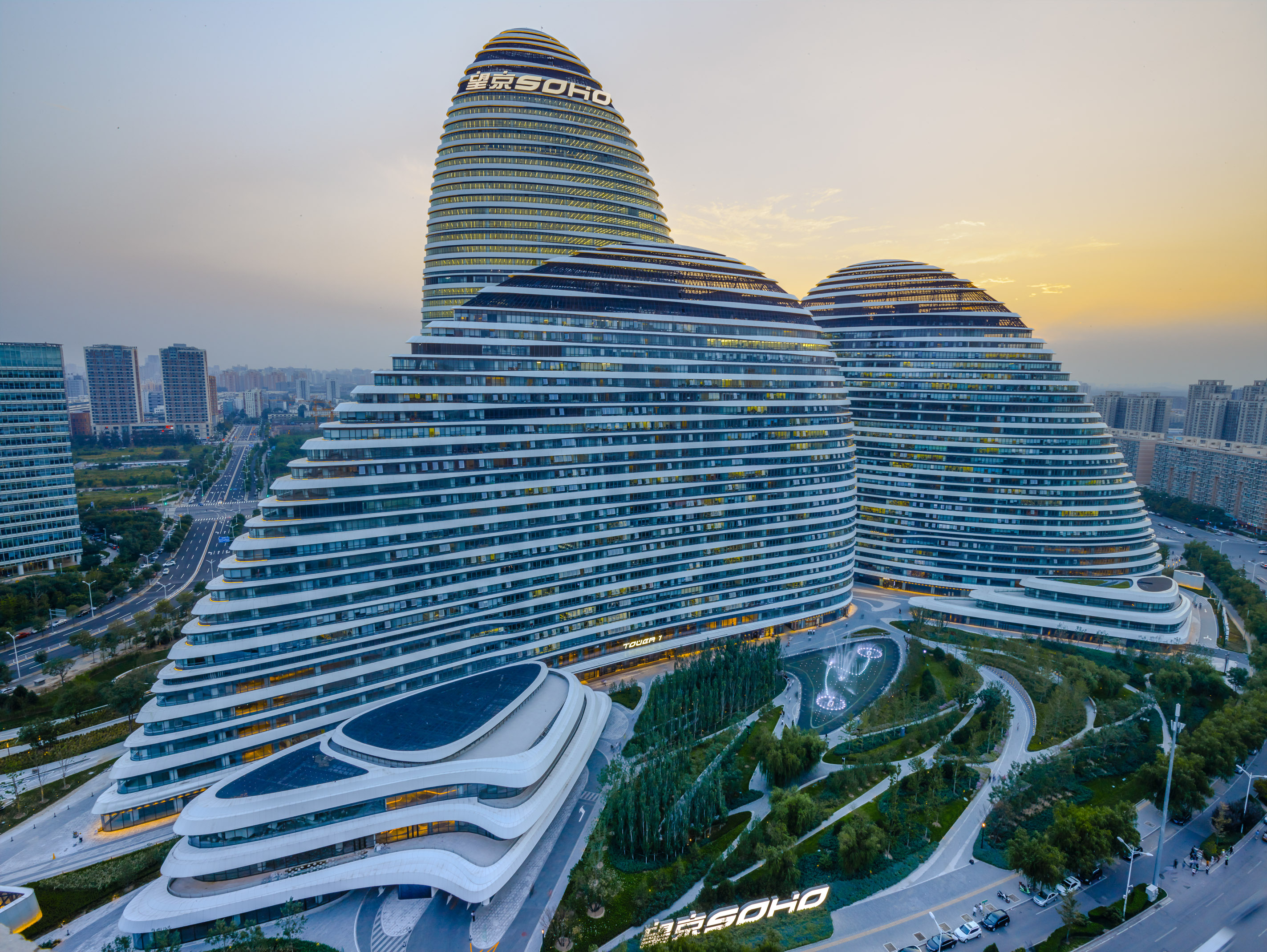
The Wangjing SOHO office complex in Beijing (2014)

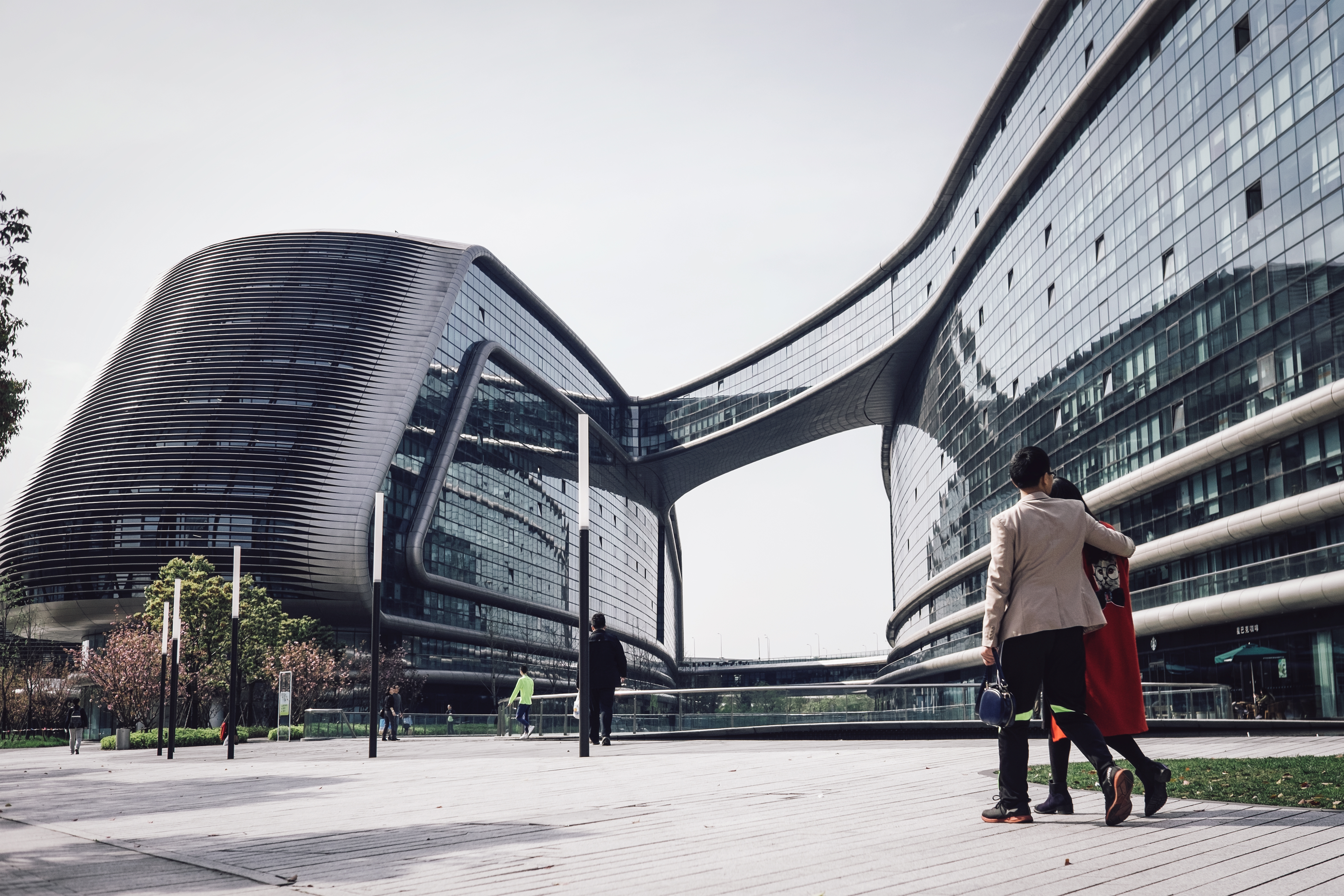
Sky SOHO, part of SOHO China in Shanghai (2014)

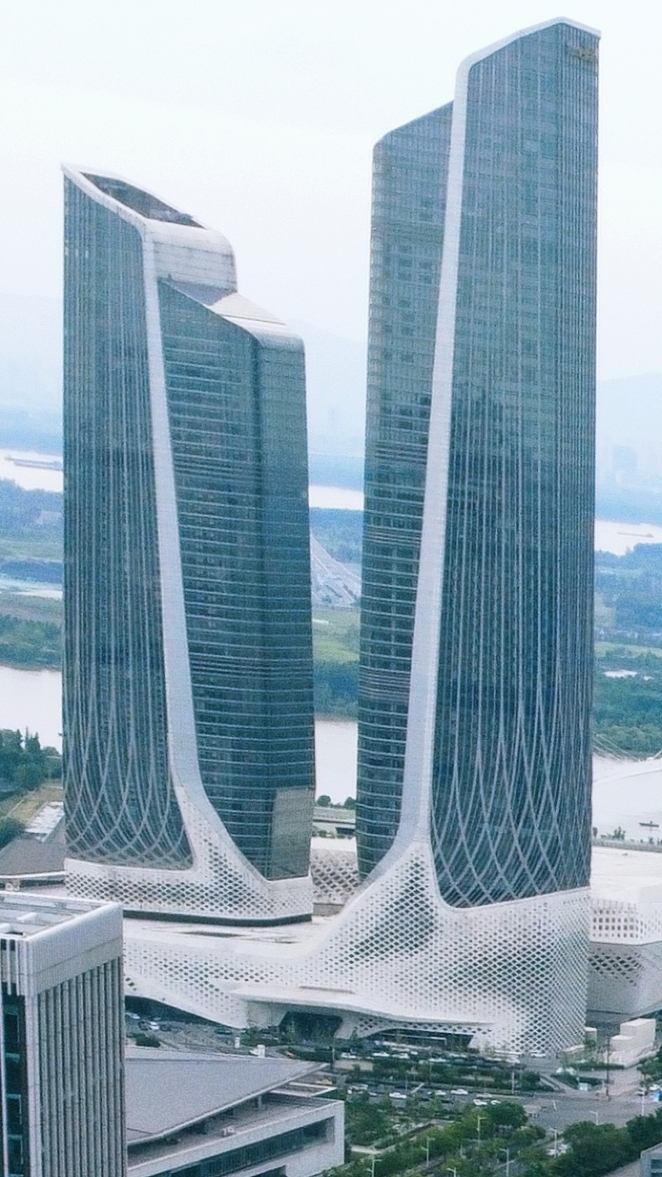
Nanjing International Youth Cultural Centre in Nanjing (2015)

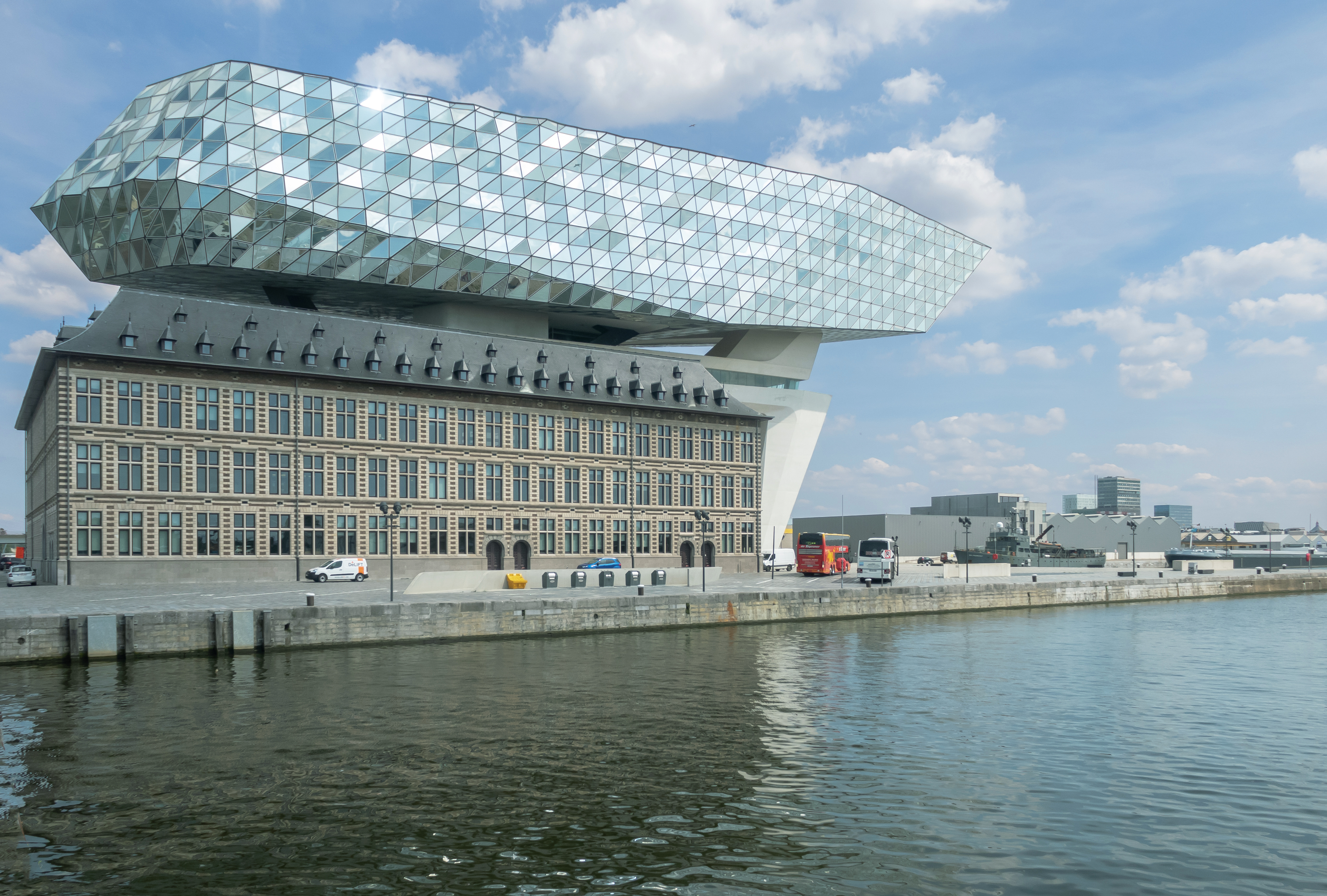
Port Authority Building in Antwerp (2016)

=== Heydar Aliyev Center, Baku, Azerbaijan (2007–2013) ===
The Heydar Aliyev Center in Baku, Azerbaijan (2007–2013) is a gigantic cultural and conference centre containing three auditoriums, a library and museum, with a total space of 10,801 square metres on a surface of 15,514 square metres, and a height of 74 metres. Hadid wrote that "its fluid form emerges from the folds of the natural topography of the landscape and envelops the different functions of the centre", though the building when completed was largely surrounded by Soviet-era apartment blocks. Peter Cook in Architectural Review called it "a white vision, outrageously total, arrogantly complete ... a unique object that confounds and contradicts the reasonable ... a wave form sweeping up, almost lunging, into the sky ... here is architecture as the ultimate statement of theatre ... It is the most complete realisation yet of the Iraqi-born architect's vision of sweeping curves and flowing space."

Consisting of eight storeys, the centre includes an auditorium with 1000 seats, exhibition space, conference hall, workshop and a museum. No straight line was used in the project of the complex. The shape of the building is wave-like and the overall view is unique and harmonic. Such an architectural structure stands for post-modernist architecture and forms oceanic feeling. The lines of the building symbolise the merging of past and future.

While the building itself was widely praised, Dame Zaha was criticized in many circles when she was awarded Britain's most prestigious prize in architecture, the Design Museum "Design of the Year," the first woman to do so. The building was named for the former ruler of Azerbaijan, Heydar Aliyev, and commissioned by his son, Illham, who became president after his father's death in 2003.

=== Dongdaemun Design Plaza, Seoul, South Korea (2007–2013) ===
The Dongdaemun Design Plaza (2007–2013) is among the largest buildings in Seoul, South Korea. Its name means "Great Gate of the East", in reference to the old walls of the city. The complex of 86,574 square metres contains exhibition space, a museum of design, conference rooms and other common facilities, as well as the bureaux and a marketplace for designers which is open 24 hours a day. The main building is 280 metres long with seven levels, including three levels underground. The smooth-skinned, giant mushroom-like structure floating atop sloping pylons is made of concrete, aluminium, steel and stone on the exterior, and finished inside with plaster reinforced with synthetic fibre, acoustic tiles, acrylic resin, and stainless steel and polished stone on the interior. Hadid wrote that the principal characteristics of her design were "transparency, porousness, and durability." It also features many ecological features, including a double skin, solar panels, and a system for recycling water.

=== Library and Learning Center, Vienna University of Economics and Business, Vienna, Austria (2008–2013) ===
The Library and Learning Center was designed as the centrepiece of the new campus of the Vienna University of Economics and Business. Containing 28,000 square metres of space, its distinctive Hadid features include walls sloping at 35 degrees and massive black volume cantilevered at an angle over the plaza in front of the building. She described the interior as follows: "The straight lines of the building's exterior separate as they move inward, becoming curvilinear and fluid to generate a free-formed interior canyon that serves as the principal public plaza of the Center, as well as generating corridors and bridges ensuring smooth transitions between different levels."

=== Serpentine Sackler North Gallery, Kensington Gardens, London, United Kingdom (2009–2013) ===
The Serpentine Sackler Gallery is a synthesis of two distinct parts – the 19th century classical brick structure named The Magazine (a former gunpowder store), and a 21st-century tensile structure. This is the second art space (after the MAXXI Museum in Rome) where Zaha Hadid Architects worked on the melding of both old and new elements. Zaha Hadid's Magazine extension on the original Grade II building was aided by the reinstatement of the building to an historic arrangement as a free-standing pavilion within an enclosure, with the former courtyards covered. The North Gallery extension features Hadid's distinct hallmark of curves, and houses a series of skylights which welcome natural light into the space as well as retractable blinds when less light is needed. Hadid also worked in collaboration with architect and heritage specialist Liam O'Connor, whose reconstructions and conversions of the original space were designed in consultation with English Heritage and Westminster City Council. The extension houses internal exhibition spaces as well as the museum shop and offices for the curatorial team.

=== Innovation Tower, Hong Kong Polytechnic University, Hong Kong, China (2007–2014) ===
The Innovation Tower in Hong Kong (2007–2014) is part of Hong Kong Polytechnic University. The building of 15 floors has 15,000 square metres of space, with laboratories, classrooms, studios and other facilities for 1,800 students and their faculty. It was built on the site of the university's former football pitch. The extremely complex forms of the building required computer modelling. Early designs experimented with a facade made of reinforced plastic, textiles or aluminium, but Hadid finally settled upon metal panels with multiple layers. The building seems to lean towards the city. The floors inside are visible from the exterior like geological strata.

=== Wangjing SOHO Tower, Beijing, China (2009–2014) ===
Wangjing SOHO tower in Beijing is the second building Hadid designed for the major Chinese property developer, located half-way between the centre of Beijing and the airport. The towers slope and curve; Hadid compared them to Chinese fans, "whose volumes turn one around the other in a complex ballet." The tallest building is 200 metres high, with two levels of shops and 37 levels of offices. A single atrium level three storeys high joins the three buildings at the base.

=== Issam Fares Institute, AUB, Beirut, Lebanon (2014) ===
The Issam Fares Institute is located in the campus of the American University of Beirut (AUB). It won the Agha Khan Award in 2016, the same year Hadid died. It has a 21 meters cantilever in order to preserve the existing landscape. The institute aims to harness, develop and initiate research of the Arab world to enhance and broaden debate on public policy and international relations. It is currently headed by Joseph Bahout.

=== Nanjing International Youth Cultural Centre, Nanjing, China (2012–2015) ===
The Nanjing International Youth Cultural Centre are two skyscrapers in Nanjing, Jiangsu, China. Tower 1 is 314.5 metres (1,032 ft) tall and Tower 2 is 255 metres (837 ft). Construction began in 2012 and ended in 2015.

=== Port Authority, Antwerp, Belgium (2016) ===
Of all her works, Hadid designed only one government building, the Port Authority Building, or Havenhuis, in Antwerp, Belgium, completed in 2016. Most new government buildings attempt to express solidity and seriousness, but Port Authority, a ship-like structure of glass and steel on a white concrete perch, seems to have landed atop the old port building constructed in 1922. The faceted glass structure also resembles a diamond, a symbol of Antwerp's role as the major market of diamonds in Europe. It was one of the last works of Hadid, who died in 2016, the year it opened. The square in front of the building was renamed to Zaha Hadidplein (Zaha Hadidsquare) to honor her death.

== Death ==
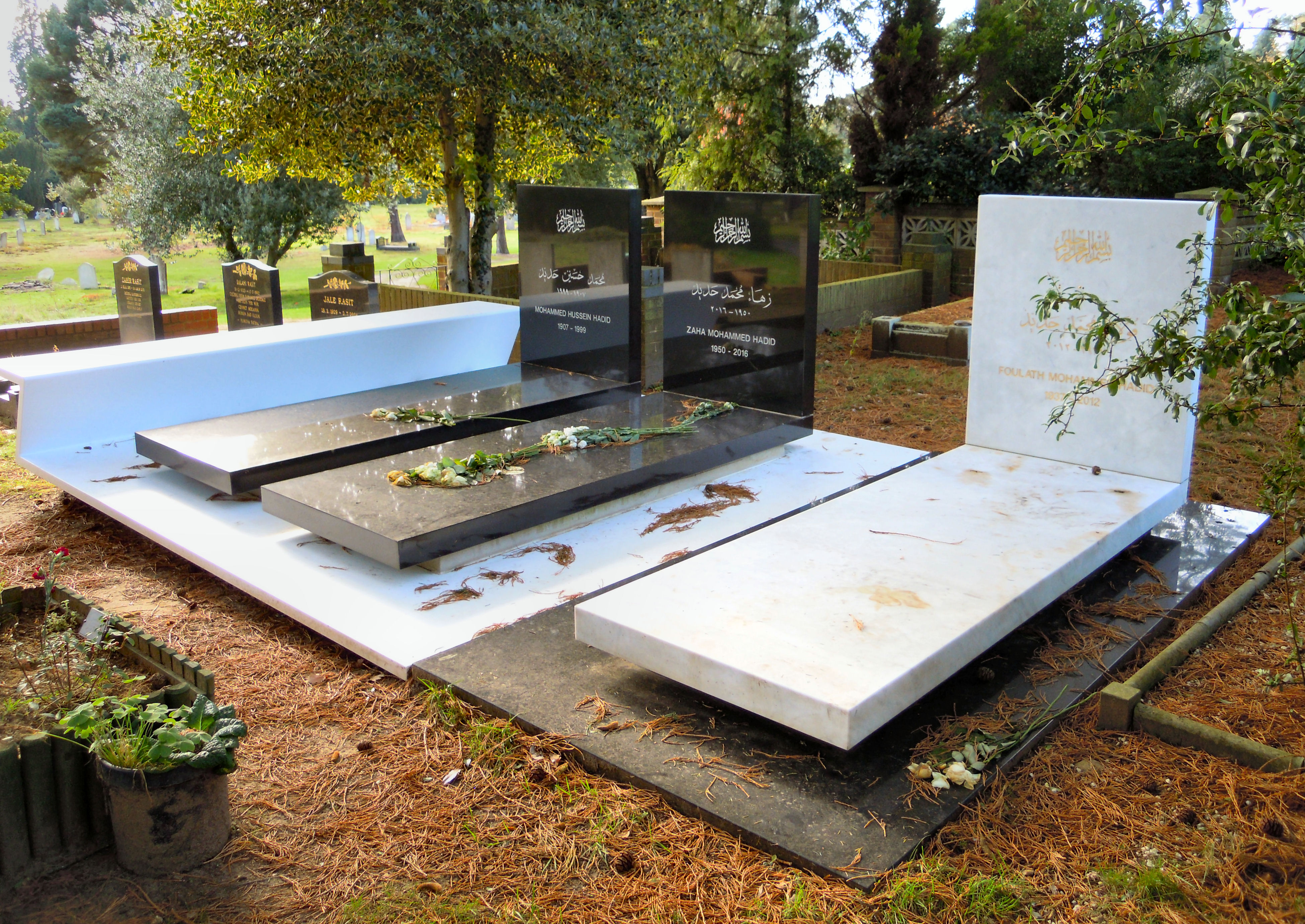
The grave of Zaha Hadid (centre) in Brookwood Cemetery

On 31 March 2016, Hadid died of a heart attack at the age of 65 at Mount Sinai Medical Center in Miami, where she was being treated for bronchitis.

The statement issued by her London-based design studio announcing her death read, "Zaha Hadid was widely regarded to be the greatest female architect in the world today". She is buried between her father Mohammed Hadid and brother Foulath Hadid in Brookwood Cemetery in Brookwood, Surrey, England.

In her will she left £67m, bequeathing various amounts to her business partner and family members. Her international design businesses, which accounted for the bulk of her wealth, were left in trust.

The architectural firm Zaha Hadid Architects maintained its global presence and activity, even after the death of its founder. In June 2026, a licensing agreement relating to the firm's continued use of Hadid's name was ended following a court ruling, and the firm rebranded as "ZHA" (company registered as ZHA Architects Ltd). It employs around 500 staff worldwide.

== Posthumous projects (2016–present) ==
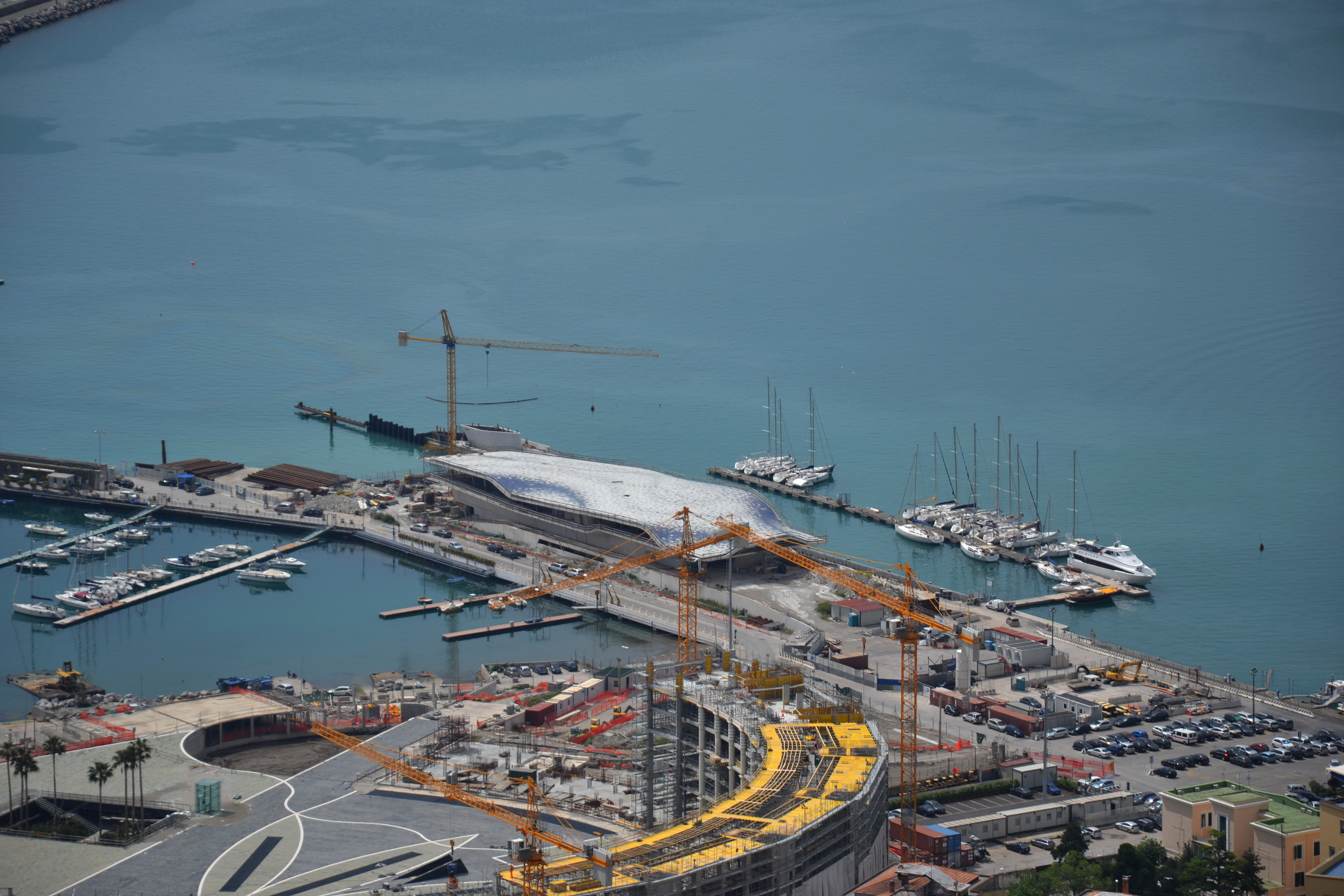
Salerno harbor station in Salerno (2016)

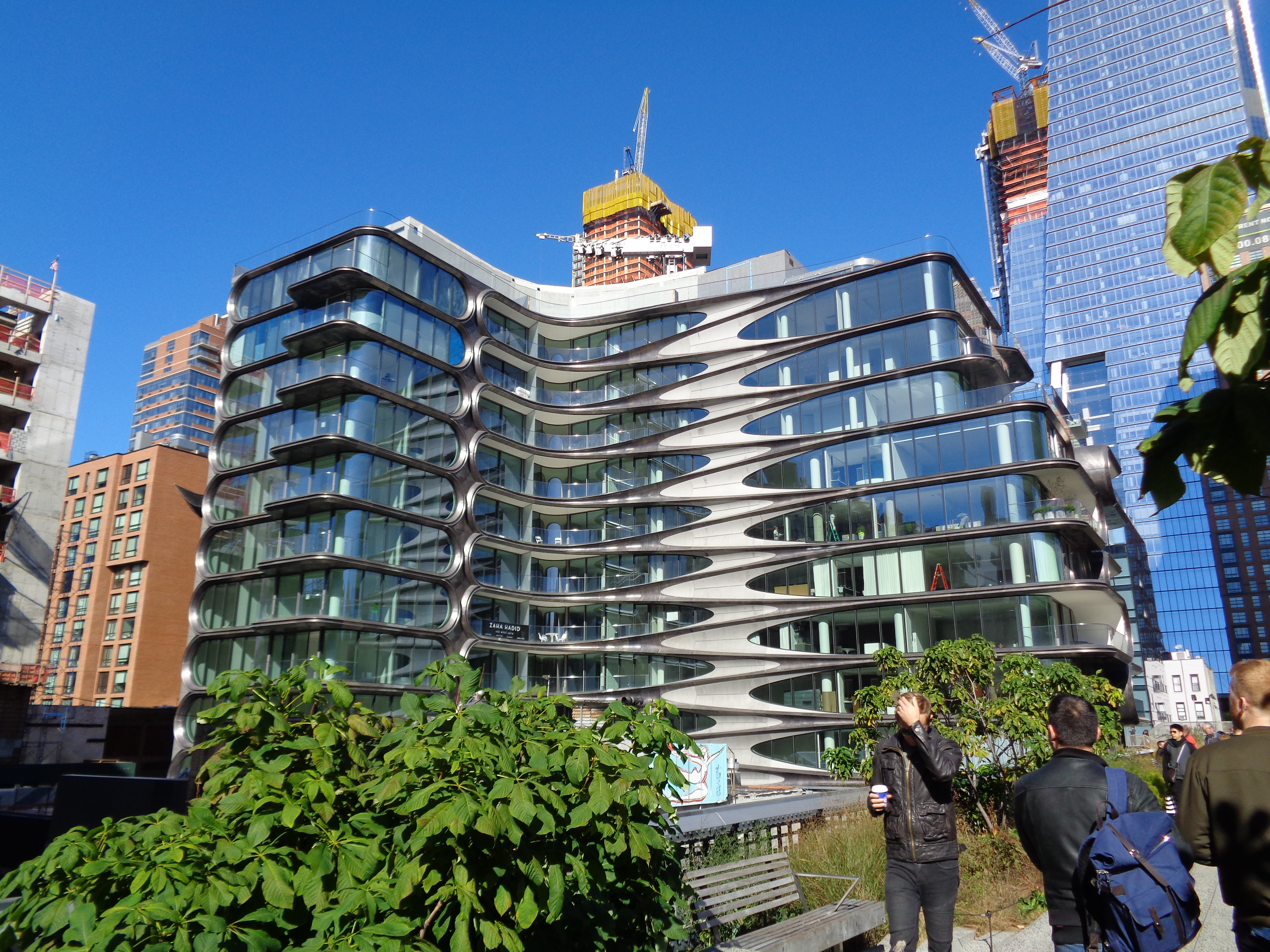
520 West 28th Street in New York City (2017)

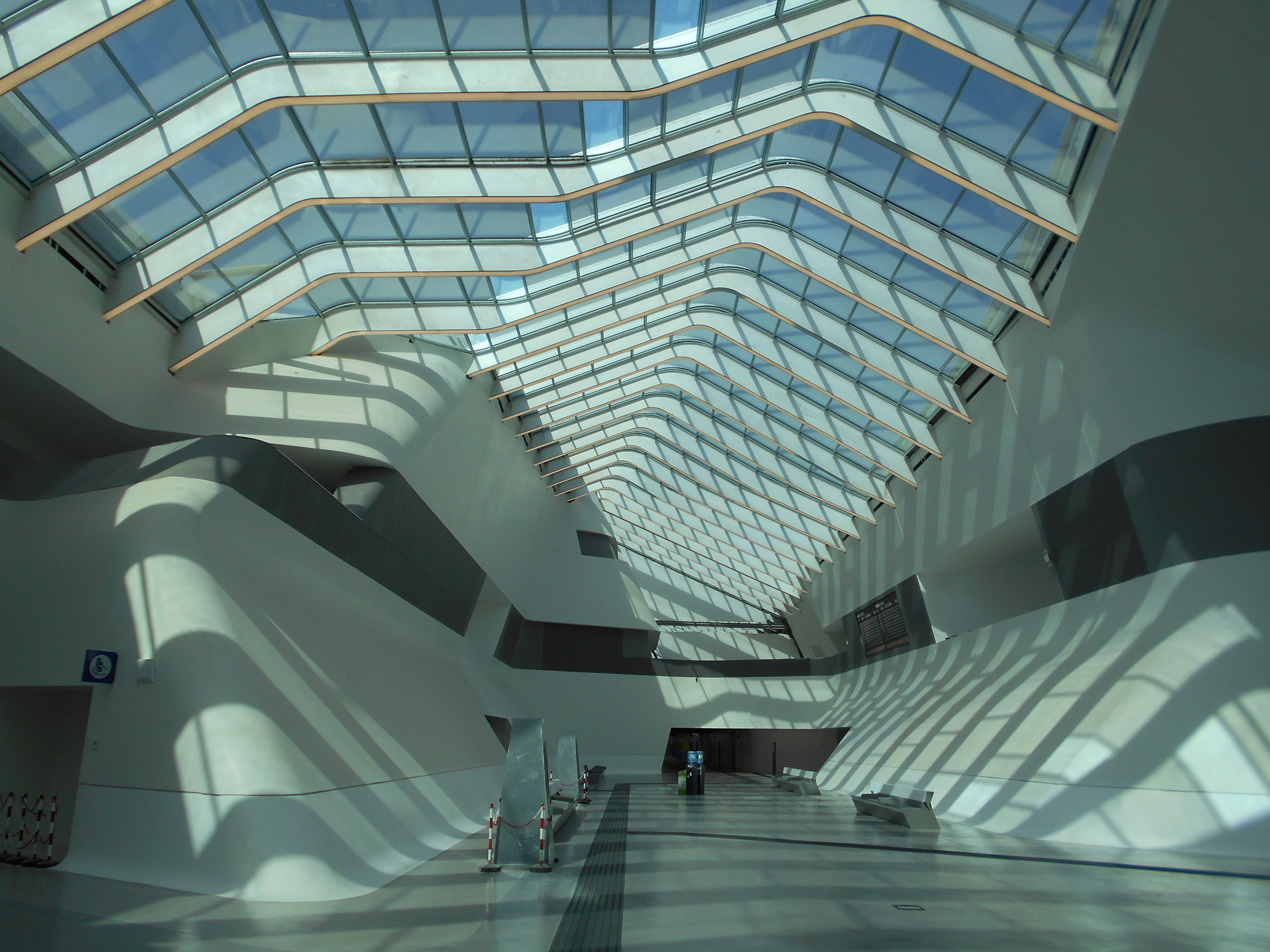
Napoli Afragola railway station in Afragola, Naples (2017)

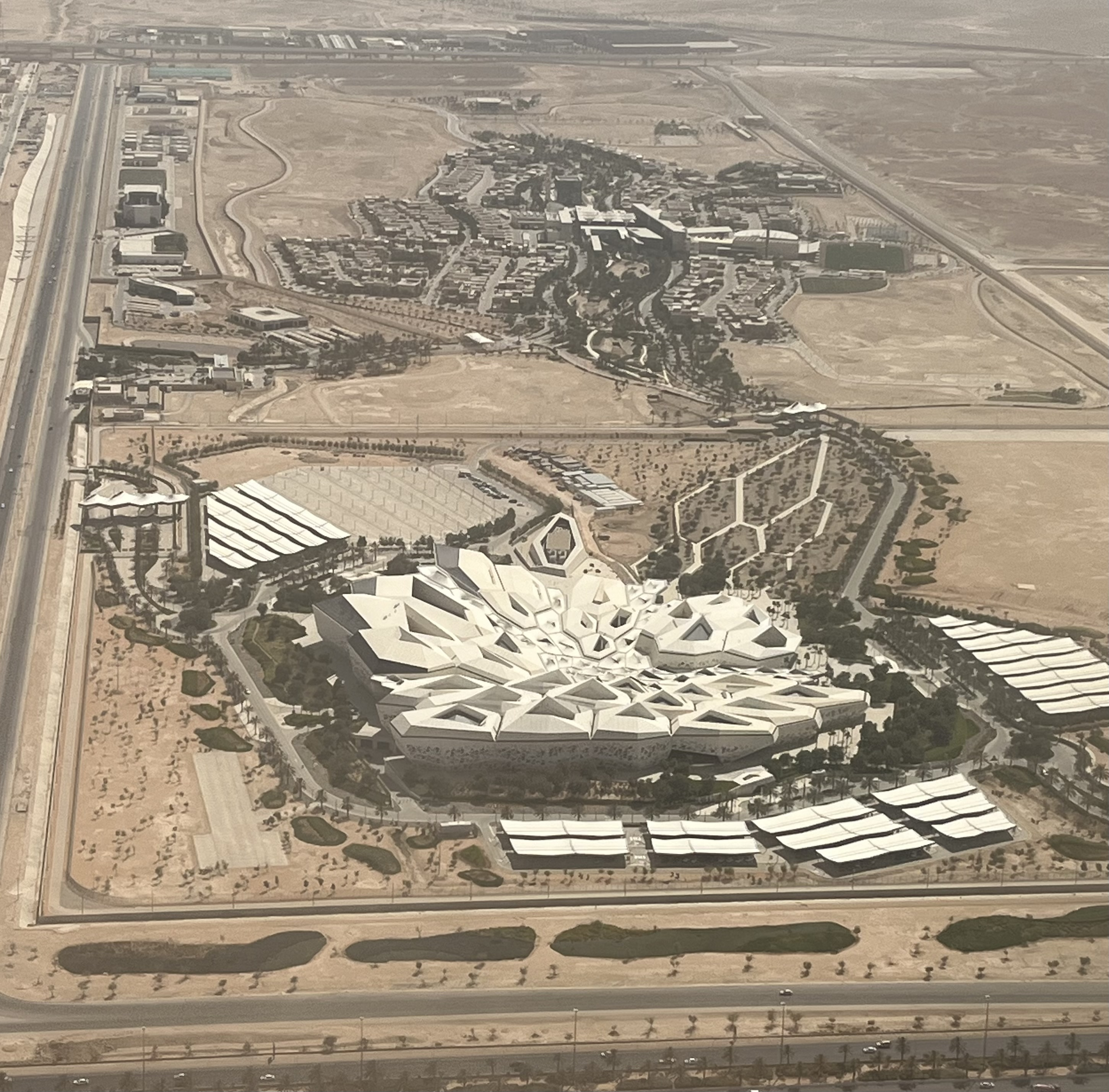
King Abdullah Petroleum Studies and Research Center in Riyadh (2017)

Al-Janoub Stadium in Al-Wakrah (2019)

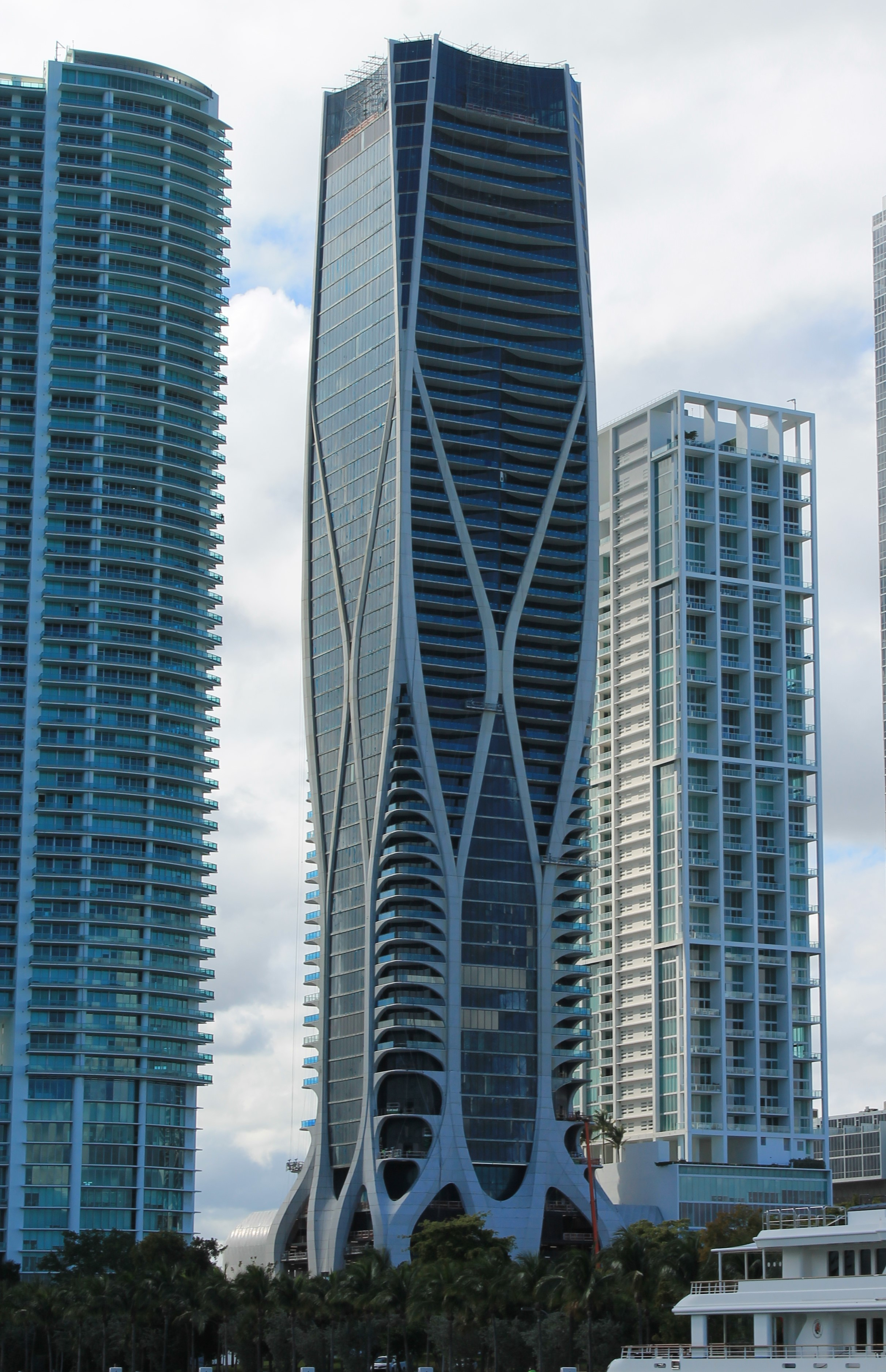
One Thousand Museum in Florida (2019)

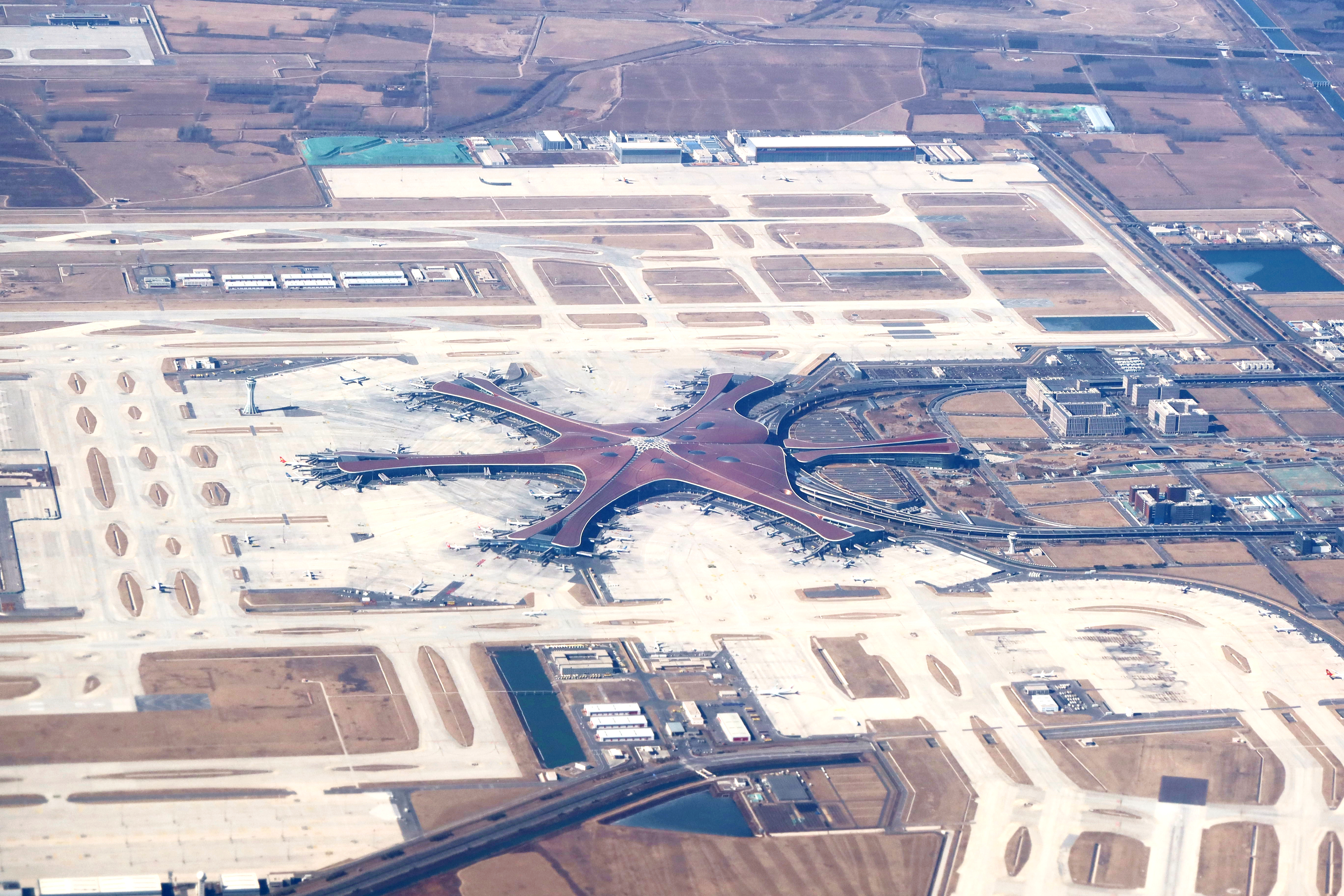
Beijing Daxing International Airport in Beijing (2019)

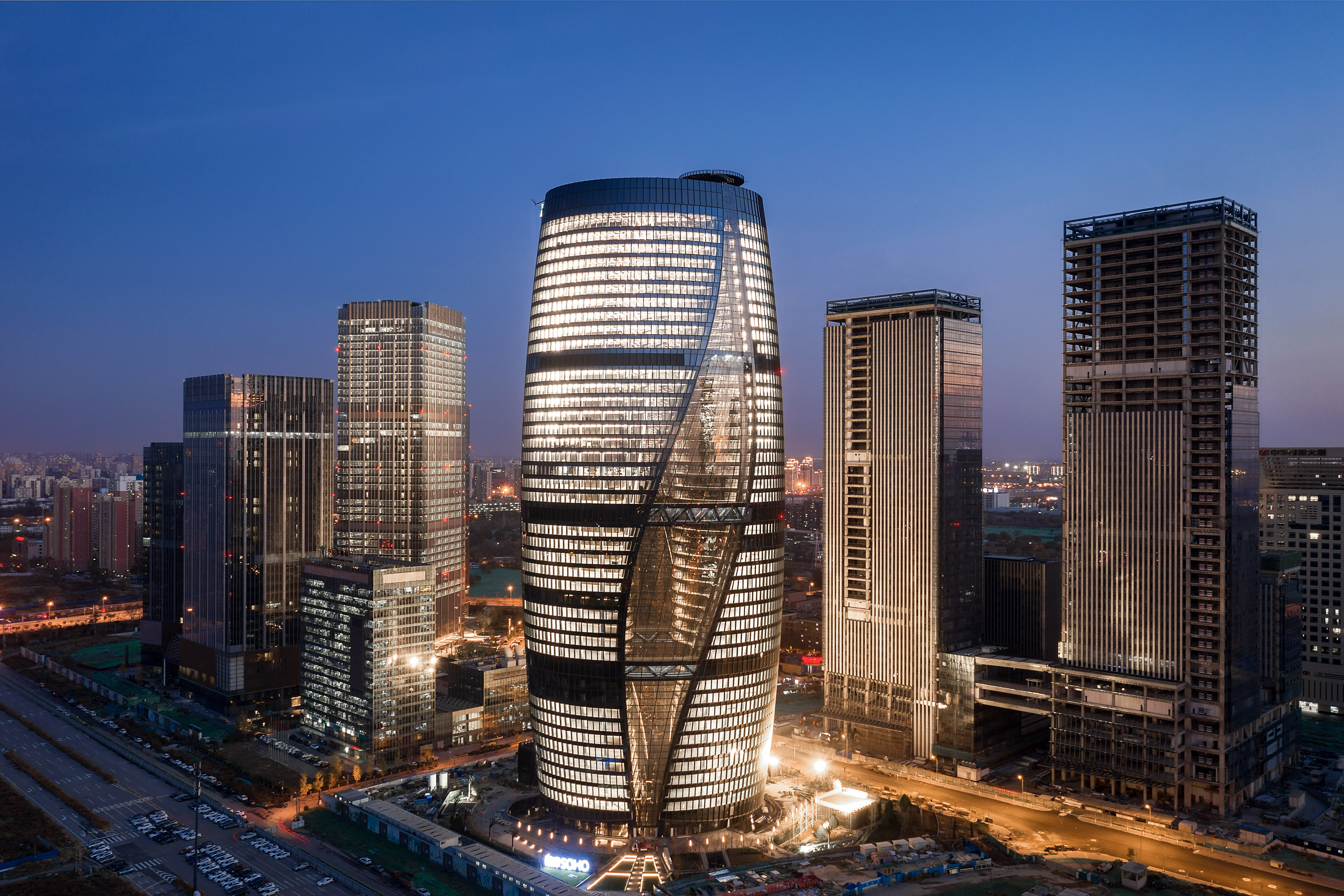
Leeza SOHO in Beijing (2019)

Grand Theatre of Rabat in Rabat (2021)

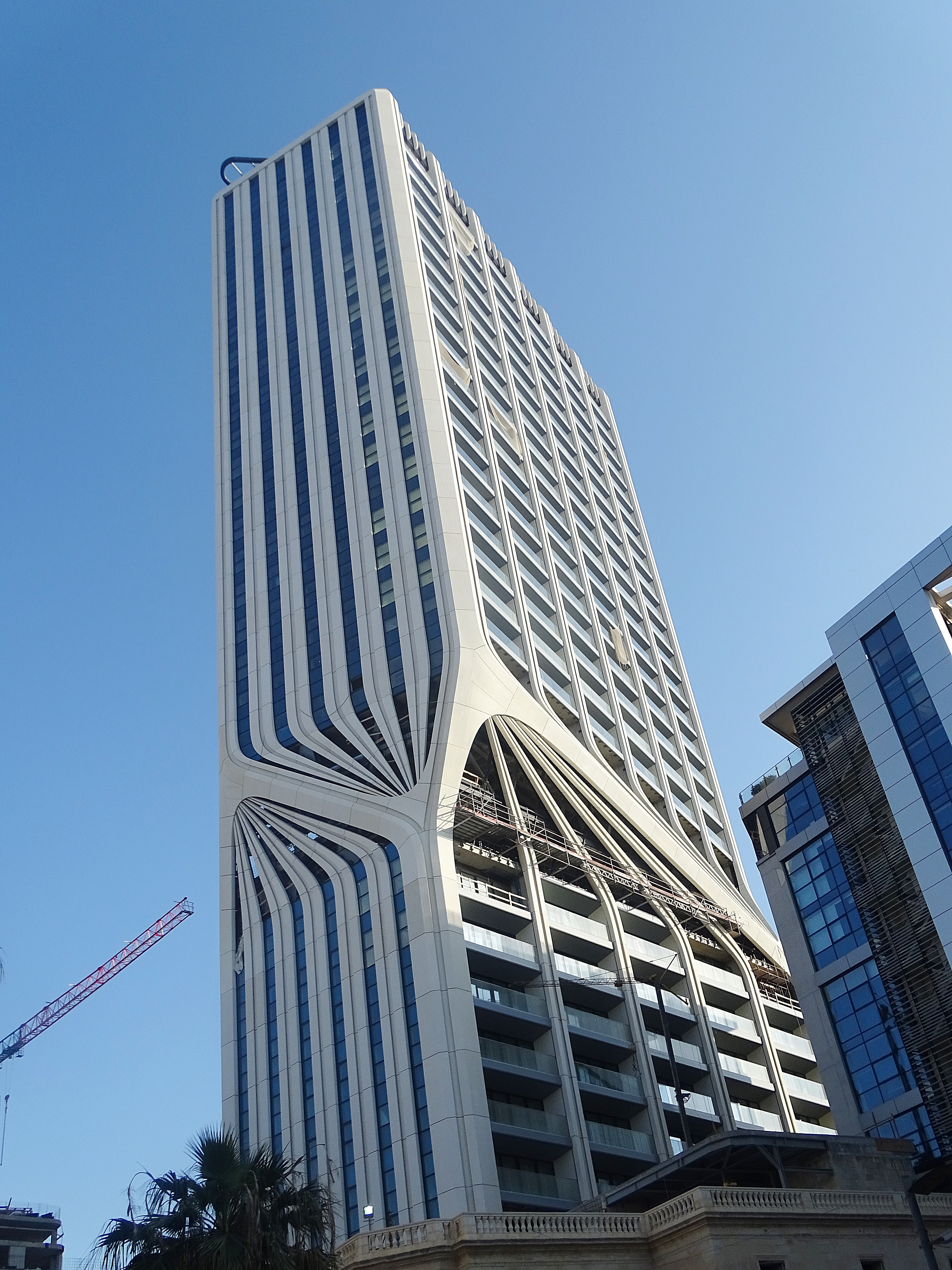
Mercury Tower in Saint Julian's (2023)

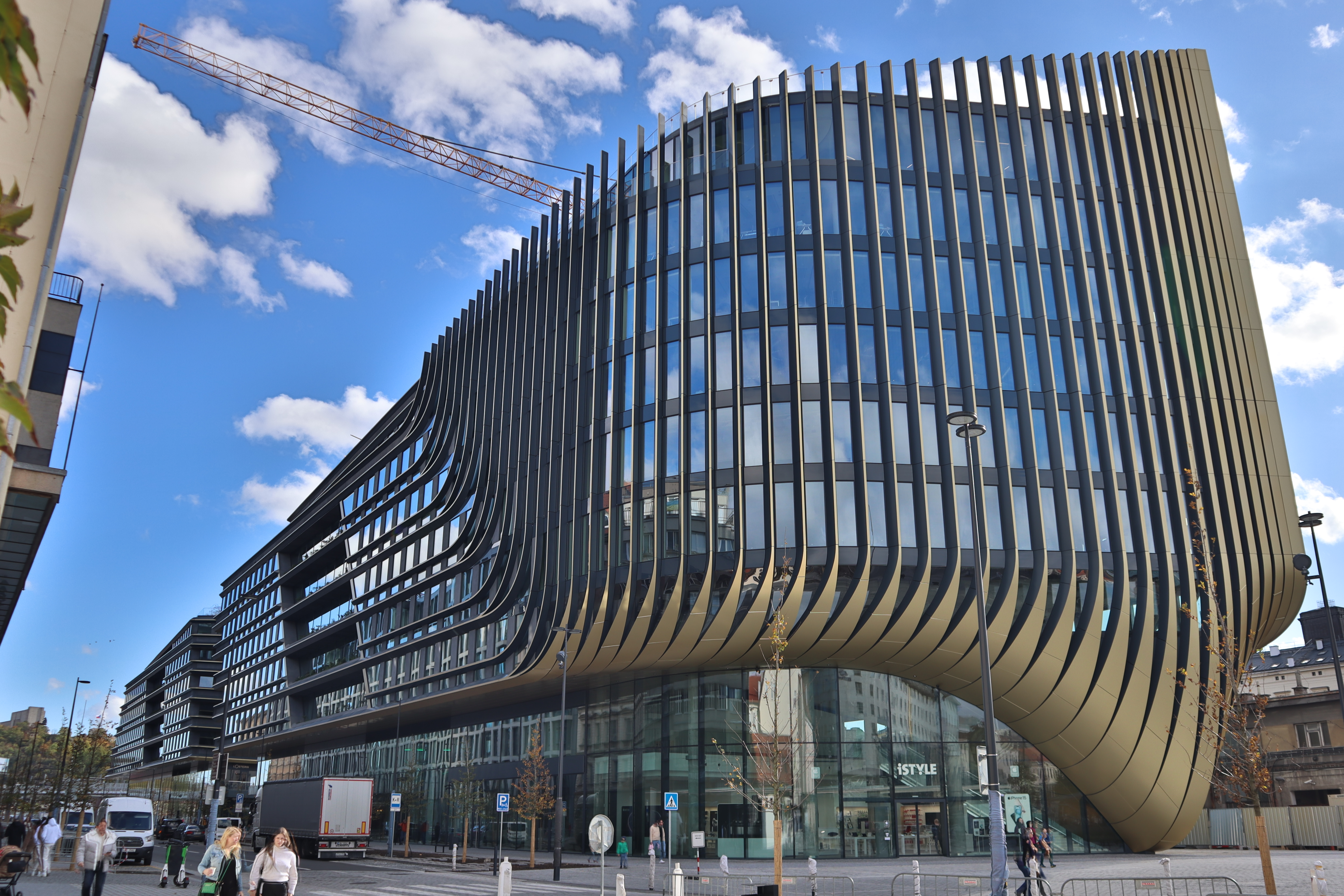
Masaryčka in Prague (2023)

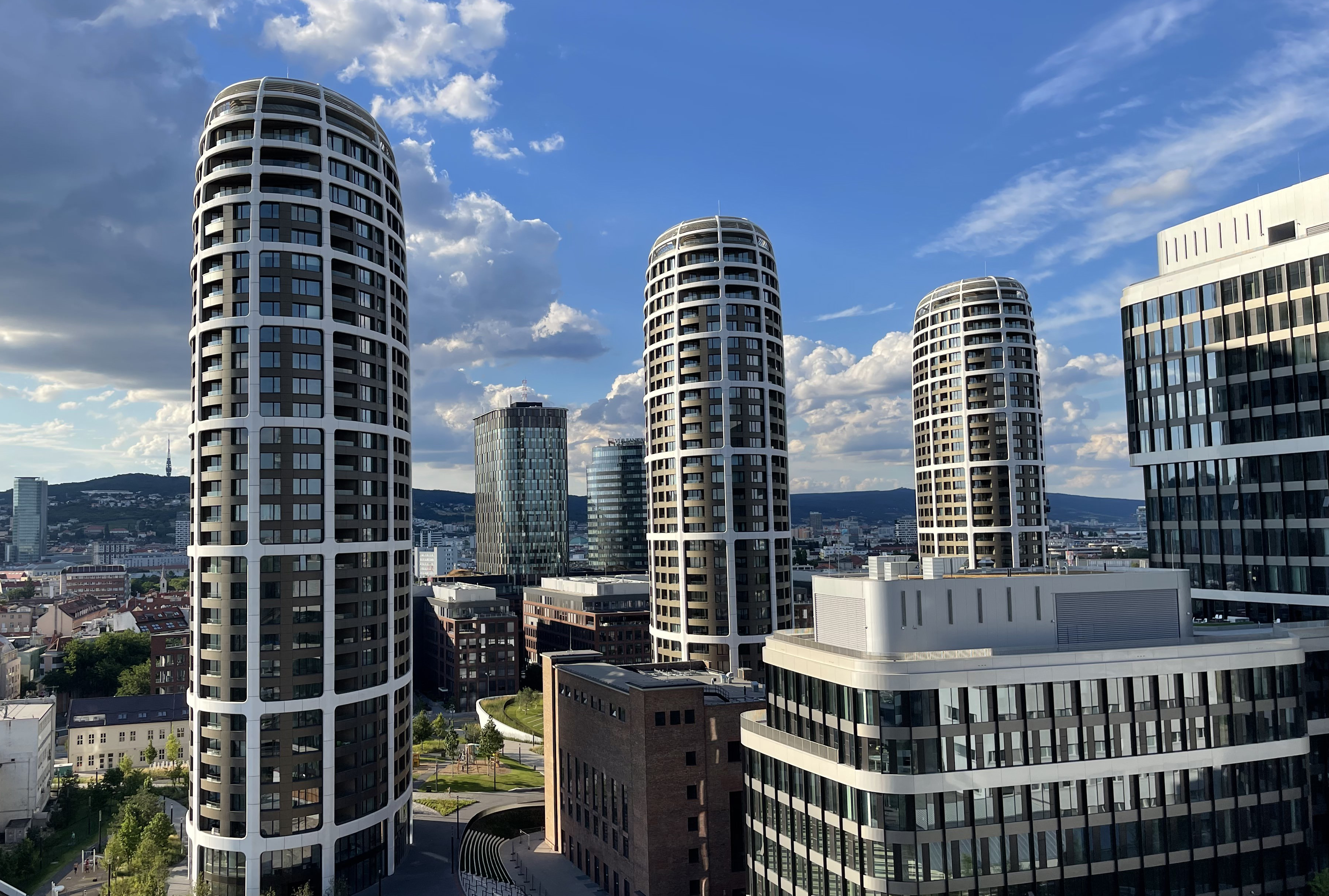
Sky Park Residence in Bratislava (2024)

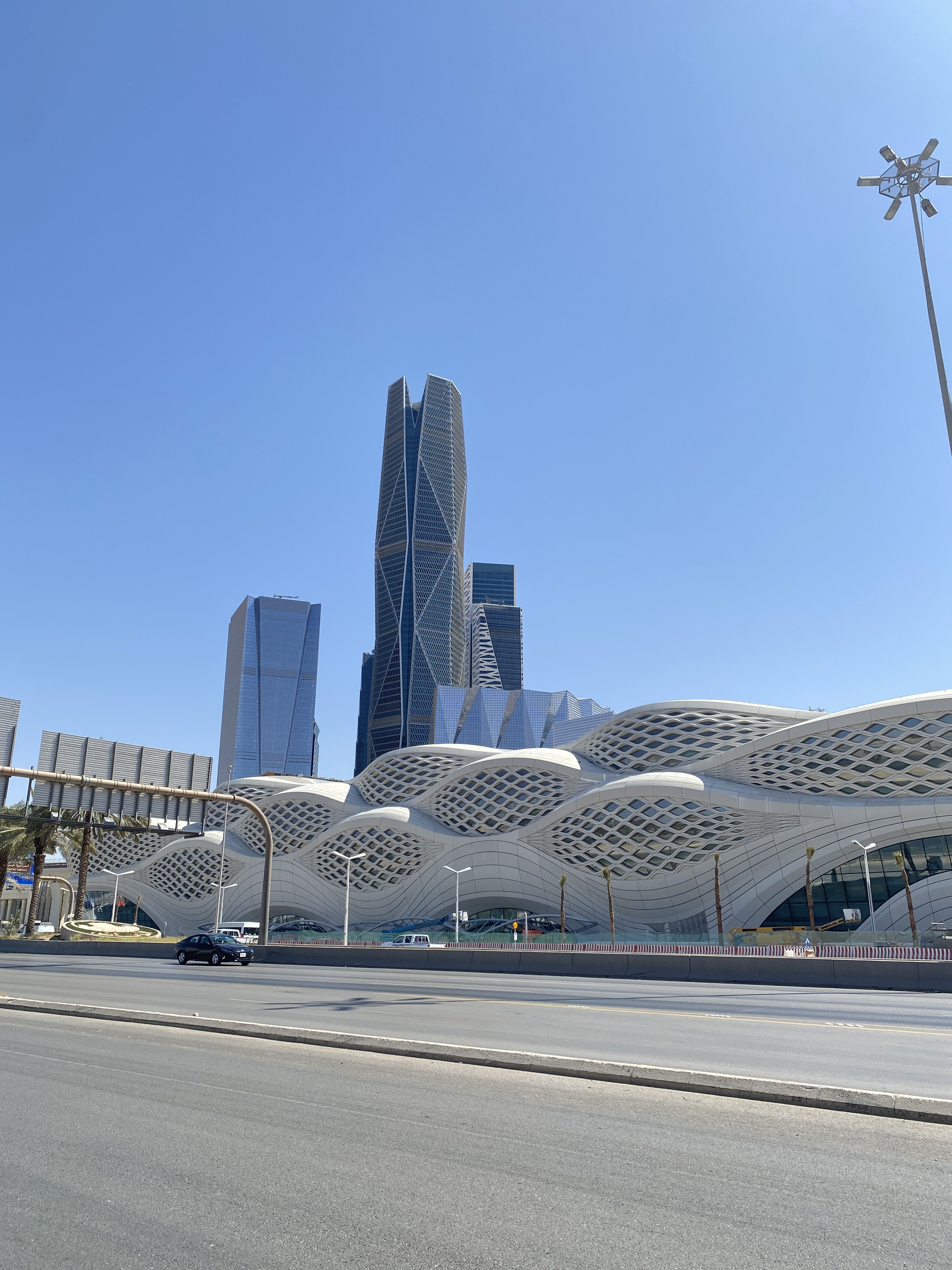
KAFD Station in Riyadh (2024)

Central Bank of Iraq Tower in Baghdad (2025)

=== Skyscraper proposed for Manhattan, New York, United States (Never built) ===
Skyscraper proposed for Midtown Manhattan to replace 666 Fifth Avenue. On 25 March 2017, Kam Dhillon reported a yet-to-be completed skyscraper design designed by Hadid prior to her death in 2016 in an article titled "Zaha Hadid Architects Unveils Monumental Skyscraper Project for NYC".

=== Salerno Harbor Station, Salerno, Italy (2000–2016) ===
The first major project to be completed shortly after her death was the Salerno harbor station in Salerno, Italy, her first major transportation building. She won the competition for the building in 2000, but then the project was delayed due to funding and technical issues. Hadid scouted the site from a police boat in the harbour to visualise how it would appear from the water. The final building covers 50,000 square feet and cost 15 million Euros. Paola Cattarin, the project architect who completed the building after Hadid's death, said, "We thought of the building as an oyster, with a hard shell top and bottom, and a softer, liquid, more organic interior." At the opening of the new building, posters of Hadid were placed around the city, saying, "Goodbye Zaha Hadid; Genius and Modernity, Inspiration and Transformation, Light That Takes Shape."

=== 520 West 28th Street, Manhattan, New York, United States (2014–2017) ===
520 West 28th Street, also known as the Zaha Hadid Building, is located in New York City. Designed by the architect Zaha Hadid, the building was her only residential building in New York and one of her last projects before her death.

=== King Abdullah Petroleum Studies and Research Center, Riyadh, Saudi Arabia (2009–2017) ===
Research and Office Complex was designed by Zaha Hadid. Hadid received the commission after a 2009 design competition. It opened in October 2017 and received a LEED Platinum certification. The complex consists of five interlocking buildings, a research center, a computer center, a conference center, a library and the Musalla, a place for prayer.

=== Al-Janoub Stadium, Al Wakrah, Qatar (2014–2019) ===
Al-Janoub Stadium is a retractable-roof football stadium in Al-Wakrah, Qatar that was inaugurated on 16 May 2019. This was the second of the eight stadiums inaugurated for the 2022 FIFA World Cup in Qatar.

Zaha Hadid Architects stated that "The stadium was designed in conjunction with a new precinct so that it sits at the heart of an urban extension of the city, creating community-based activities in and around the stadium on non-event days." According to the designers, it was inspired by the sails of traditional Dhow boats, used by pearl divers from the region, weaving through currents of the Persian Gulf.

=== Scorpion Tower of Miami, Florida, United States (2015–2019) ===
The Scorpion Tower of Miami, now known as One Thousand Museum, was started while Hadid was still alive. It is noted by its curved external columns standing the full length of the building.

=== Beijing Daxing International Airport, China (2014–2019) ===
The Beijing Daxing International Airport opened in September 2019.

=== The Opus, Dubai, United Arab Emirates (2012–2019) ===
The Opus designed by Zaha Hadid is a mixed-use 20 storey tower, housing residences, offices, a mix of restaurants, retail spaces and a five-star hotel. The building comprises two structures that form a single cube which appears to hover above the ground, eroded by a fluid void.

=== Grand Theatre of Rabat, Rabat, Morocco (2014–2021) ===
A futuristic building, faithful to the imprint of the architect, which can host the biggest cultural events of the Moroccan capital. The works, launched in October 2014 and was completed in 2021. Grand Theatre of Rabat consists of a large multipurpose room, which has 1822 seats and can accommodate different types of shows. For each artistic presentation with specific acoustics needs, the theater is equipped with adjustable systems. The theater also has a small modular room with 127 seats, a restaurant with panoramic views, shops, cafes and a bookstore.

=== Mercury Tower, St. Julian's, Malta (2016–2023) ===
The Mercury Tower is the tallest building in Malta. The Tower is 122 metres (400 ft) tall, with 32 floors of mixed residential and hotel space. The most iconic feature of the building is the twisted area between levels 9 and 11 that provide its distinctive appearance. This development is one of the last concept designs signed off by Zaha Hadid personally before her death in 2016.

=== Masaryčka, Prague, Czech Republic (2015–2023) ===
The "Masaryčka Connects" project is a significant urban regeneration effort in the centre of Prague, transforming the city's first railway station, operational since 1845, into a modern transport hub. In 2015–2016, Zaha Hadid supervised the conceptual design of a new mixed-use building that replaced a formal cargo terminal.

The construction took place in 2020–2023, as some delay was caused by negotiations with heritage protection authorities. Reflective of Hadid's iconic style, the building integrates fluid forms and dynamic structures, intended to harmonize with Prague's existing architectural heritage while adding a modern element to the cityscape.

The design of the buildings features vertical, fin-like elements and a curvilinear base, intended to animate the streetscape and encourage public engagement. This structure utilizes its lower two floors for retail purposes, providing a commercial zone at street level. The office levels that follow above are topped off with a rooftop garden. Upcoming developments include a direct airport line and an elevated platform above the railway tracks, interconnecting the surrounding parts of the city.

=== Sky Park Residence I, II, III, IV, Bratislava, Slovakia (2016–2024) ===
Four identical 31-storey residential towers measuring 105 metres (355 ft) tall, in the Sky Park complex neighbouring Bratislava city centre. Although the project was presented in 2010, the construction on the project began in December 2016. The construction of the Sky Park Residence I, II and III was completed in 2020 and the construction of the fourth residential tower started in 2021 and was completed in 2024. All four towers housing 1,048 apartments.

=== KAFD Station, Riyadh, Saudi Arabia (2014–2024) ===
A 7-story, 20,434 sq. meter King Abdullah Financial District Metro Station in Riyadh, Saudi Arabia opened in December 2024.

=== Central Bank of Iraq Tower, Baghdad, Iraq (2018–2025) ===
In May 2010, the Central bank of Iraq (CBI) had commissioned Hadid to design the new headquarters. Although the project was presented in 2011, the construction on the project only began in late 2018 and it is scheduled to be completed in 2025. Central Bank of Iraq Tower will serve as the new headquarters for the Central bank of Iraq. It also features VIP entrance, visitor entrance, main lobby, museums, personnel entrance, energy center, public area, personnel facility, cash management area, data center, security center and landscaping areas.

=== Sky Park Tower, Bratislava, Slovakia (2024–2027) ===
The tower with different design then the other four identical Sky Park Residence buildings is under construction in Bratislava. The last and tallest Sky Park 33-storey residential tower with 393 apartments is set to reach a height of 119 metres (390 ft) tall in the Sky Park complex. It will be the third tallest building in Slovakia. Although the project was presented together with Sky Park Residence in 2010, the construction on the Sky Park Tower only began in 2024. With expected completion in 2027, it will be the last posthumous completed project with direct involvement of Zaha Hadid before her death.

== Teaching ==
In the 1990s, she held the Sullivan Chair professorship at the University of Illinois at Chicago's University of Illinois at Chicago College of Architecture and the Arts school of architecture. At various times, she served as guest professor at the Hochschule für bildende Künste Hamburg (HFBK Hamburg), the Knowlton School of Architecture at Ohio State University, the Masters Studio at Columbia University, and was the Eero Saarinen Visiting professor of Architectural Design at the Yale School of Architecture. In 1994, she was the Kenzo Tange Visiting professor of architecture at the Harvard Graduate School of Design. From 2000, Hadid was an o. Univ.-Prof. (Full professor) at the Institute of Architecture at the University of Applied Arts Vienna, in the Zaha Hadid Masterclass.

== Interior architecture and product design ==
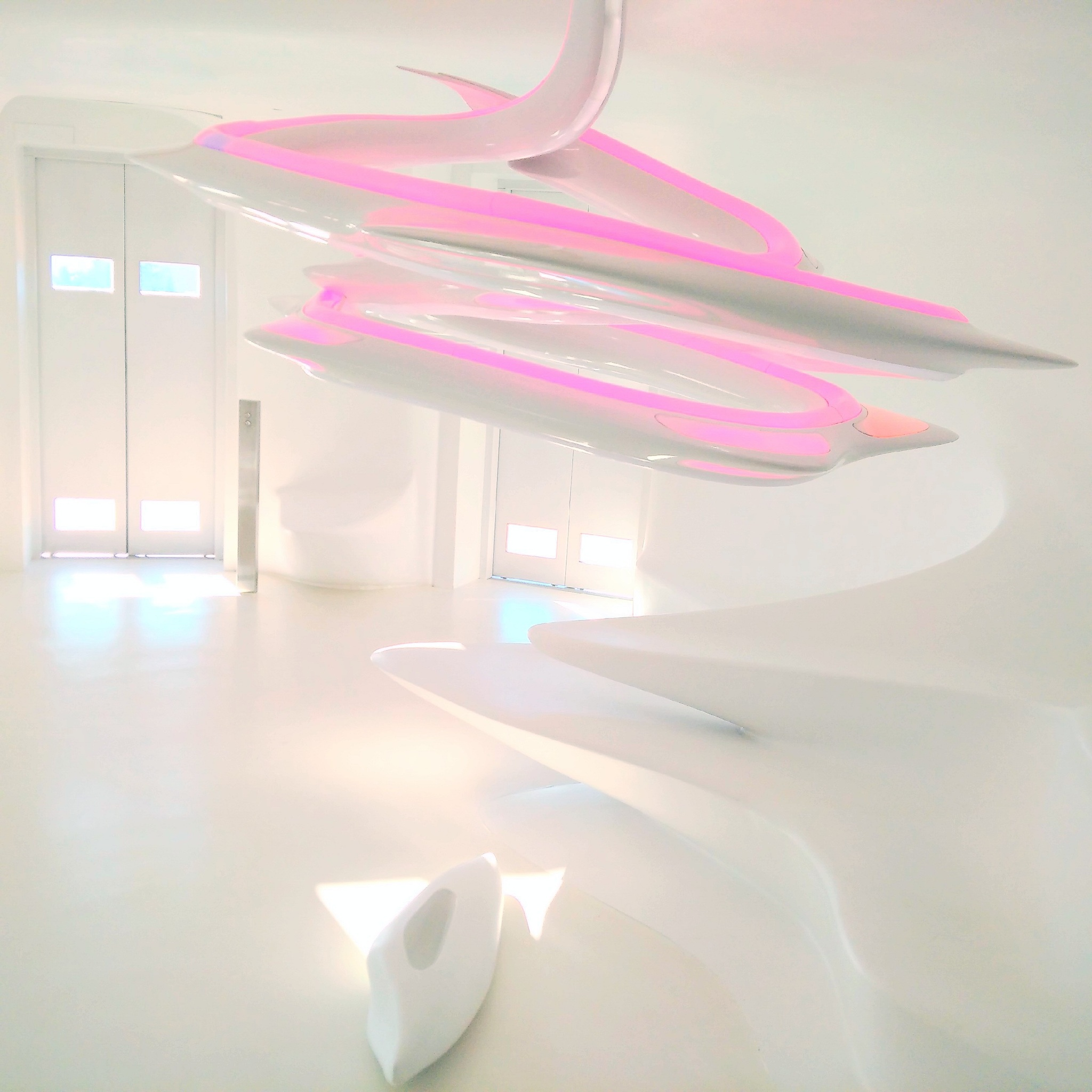
Hadid's fluid interior of the Silken Puerta America in Madrid

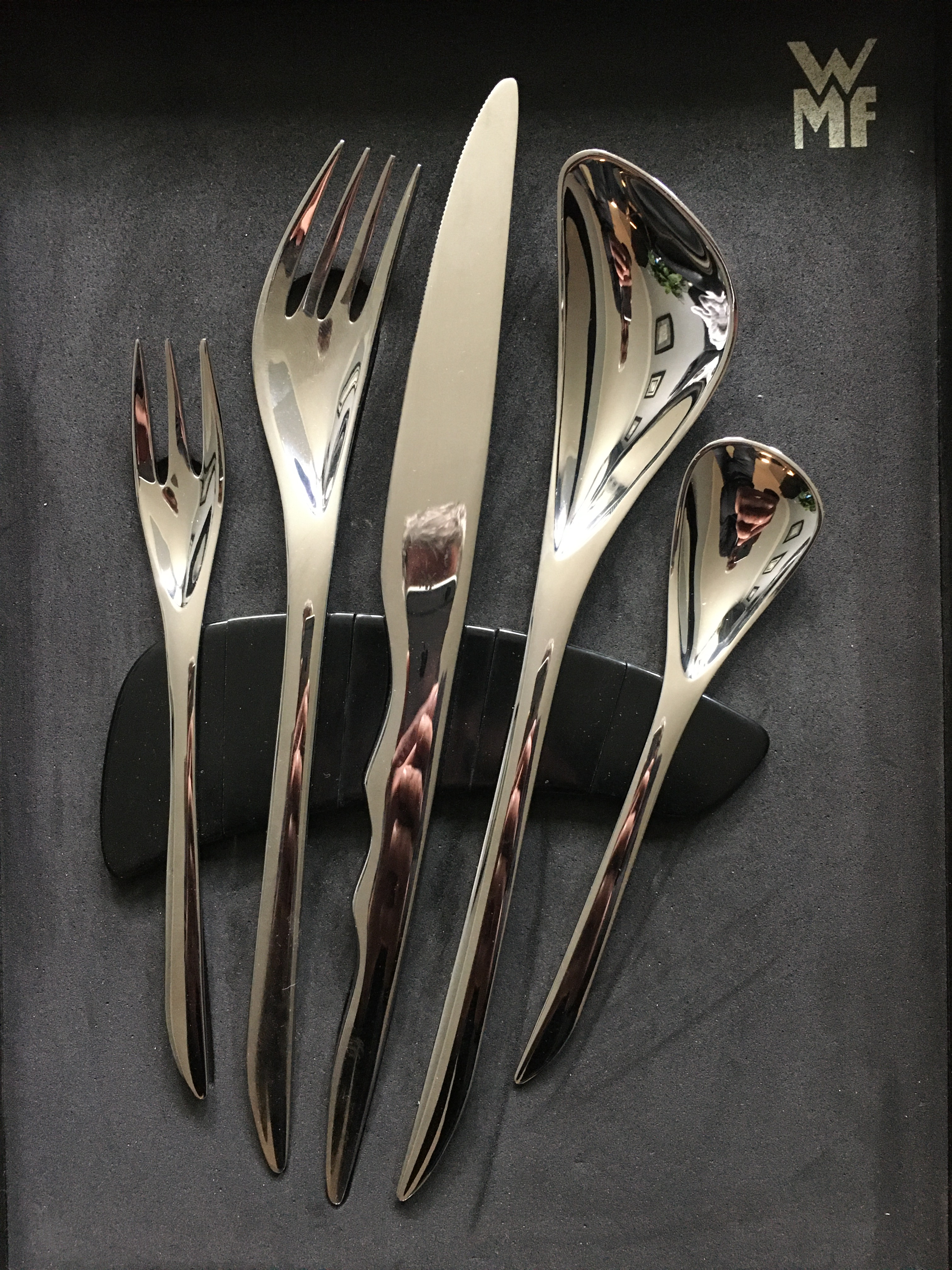
Cutlery designed by Hadid for German WMF Group, 2007

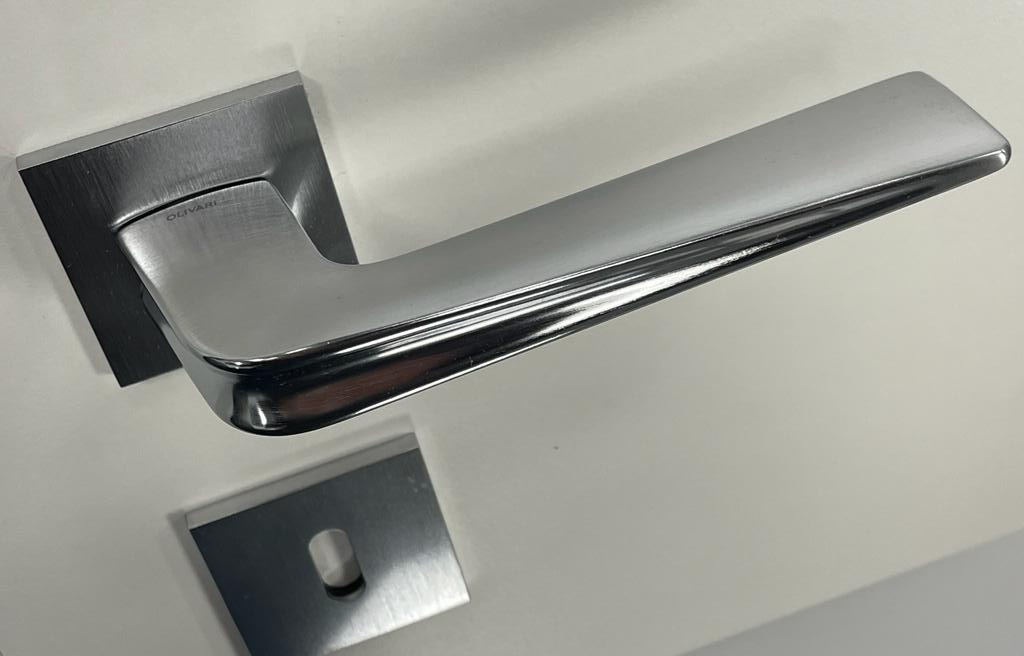
Chevron doorhandle for Olivari

Hadid also undertook some high-profile interior work, including the Mind Zone at the Millennium Dome in London as well as creating fluid furniture installations within the Georgian surroundings of Home House private members club in Marylebone, and the Z.CAR hydrogen-powered, three-wheeled automobile, amongst many other designs.

In 2006, Zaha Hadid founded Zaha Hadid Design (ZHD); her eponymous design studio.

In 2007, Hadid designed Dune Formations for David Gill Gallery and the Moon System Sofa for leading Italian furniture manufacturer B&B Italia.

In 2009 she worked with the clothing brand Lacoste to create a new, high fashion, and advanced boot. In the same year, she also collaborated with the brassware manufacturer Triflow Concepts to produce two new designs in her signature parametric architectural style.

In 2013, Hadid designed Liquid Glacial for David Gill Gallery which comprises a series of tables resembling ice-formations made from clear and coloured acrylic. Their design embeds surface complexity and refraction within a powerful fluid dynamic. The collection was further extended in 2015–2016. In 2016 the gallery launched Zaha's final collection of furniture entitled UltraStellar

ZHD is a subsidiary of the Zaha Hadid Foundation. The designs created ensure consistency with the Founder's ethos by continuing to coherently translate and apply Hadid's methodological approach to any new design.

== Architectural firm ==
Her architectural design firm, Zaha Hadid Architects, employs 500 people. Its headquarters from 1985 were in a Victorian former-school building in Clerkenwell, London. In 2021 they moved to Goswell Road, Clerkenwell.

Hadid established an architectural firm named Zaha Hadid Architects in New York. One of the notable buildings designed by this agency is the boutique pavilion of Il Makiage.

== Reputation ==
Following her death in March 2016, Michael Kimmelman of The New York Times wrote: "her soaring structures left a mark on skylines and imaginations and in the process re-shaped architecture for the modern age...Her buildings elevated uncertainty to an art, conveyed in the odd way of one entered and moved through these buildings and in the questions that her structures raised about how they were supported ... Hadid embodied, in its profligacy and promise, the era of so-called starchitects who roamed the planet in pursuit of their own creative genius, offering miracles, occasionally delivering." She is quoted as saying "I don't make nice little buildings".

Deyan Sudjic of The Guardian described Hadid as "an architect who first imagined, then proved, that space could work in radical new ways ... Throughout her career, she was a dedicated teacher, enthused by the energy of the young. She was not keen to be characterised as a woman architect, or an Arab architect. She was simply an architect."

In an interview published in Icon magazine, she said: "I never use the issue about being a woman architect ... but if it helps younger people to know they can break through the glass ceiling, I don't mind that." However, she admitted that she never really felt a part of the male-dominant architecture "establishment". She once said "As a woman in architecture you're always an outsider. It's OK, I like being on the edge.'

Sometimes called the "Queen of the curve", Hadid was frequently described in the press as the world's top female architect. although her work also attracted criticism. The Metropolitan Museum in New York cited her "unconventional buildings that seem to defy the logic of construction". Her architectural language was described as "famously extravagant" and she was accused of building "dictator states". Architect Sean Griffiths characterised Hadid's work as "an empty vessel that sucks in whatever ideology might be in proximity to it".

In 2013, Hadid founded a charitable organisation, the Zaha Hadid Foundation. It became operational in 2022 to look after Hadid's legacy and a collection of over 15,000 works by or related to Hadid, and is the only architectural foundation dedicated to a solo woman of colour. The foundation operates from buildings formerly occupied by the Design Museum at Shad Thames and Zaha Hadid Architects at Bowling Green Lane, London.

=== Qatar controversy ===
As the architect of a stadium to be used for the 2022 FIFA World Cup in Qatar, Hadid was accused in The New York Review of Books of giving an interview in which she allegedly showed no concern for the deaths of migrant workers in Qatar involved in the project. In August 2014, Hadid sued The New York Review of Books for defamation and won. Immediately thereafter, the reviewer and author of the piece in which she was accused of showing no concern issued a retraction in which he said "work did not begin on the site for the Al Wakrah stadium, until two months after Ms Hadid made those comments; and construction is not scheduled to begin until 2015 ... There have been no worker deaths on the Al Wakrah project and Ms Hadid's comments about Qatar that I quoted in the review had nothing to do with the Al Wakrah site or any of her projects. I regret the error."

== Style ==
The architectural style of Hadid is not easily categorised, and she did not describe herself as a follower of any one style or school. Nonetheless, before she had built a single major building, she was categorised by the Metropolitan Museum of Art as a major figure in architectural Deconstructivism. Her work was also described as an example of neo-futurism and parametricism. An article profiling Hadid in the New Yorker magazine was titled "The Abstractionist".

At the time when technology was integrating into design, Zaha accepted the use of technology but still continued to hand draw her buildings and make models of the designs. This was because she did not want to limit herself and her designs to only to what the computer could do.

Through her design style, she paints the conceptual designs of her many projects in fluid and geometrical forms where "Zaha Hadid's work took shape." These would be large paintings that would aspire towards her design process and "rational nature of her construction, the drawings pulled the parts and pieces apart, exploding its site and programme."

When she was awarded the Pritzker Prize in 2004, the jury chairman, Lord Rothschild, commented: "At the same time as her theoretical and academic work, as a practising architect, Zaha Hadid has been unswerving in her commitment to modernism. Always inventive, she's moved away from existing typology, from high tech, and has shifted the geometry of buildings."

The Design Museum described her work in 2016 as having "the highly expressive, sweeping fluid forms of multiple perspective points and fragmented geometry that evoke the chaos and flux of modern life".

Hadid herself, who often used dense architectural jargon, could also describe the essence of her style very simply: "The idea is not to have any 90-degree angles. In the beginning, there was the diagonal. The diagonal comes from the idea of the explosion which "re-forms" the space. This was an important discovery."

== Awards and honours ==
Hadid was appointed Commander of the Order of the British Empire (CBE) in the 2002 Birthday Honours and Dame Commander of the Order of the British Empire (DBE) in the 2012 Birthday Honours for services to architecture.

Hadid was named an honorary member of the American Academy of Arts and Letters and an honorary fellow of the American Institute of Architects. She was on the board of trustees of The Architecture Foundation.

In 2002, Hadid won the international design competition to design Singapore's one-north master plan. In 2004, Hadid became the first female recipient of the Pritzker Architecture Prize. In 2005, her design won the competition for the new city casino of Basel, Switzerland and she was elected as a Royal Academician. In 2006, she was honoured with a retrospective spanning her entire work at the Guggenheim Museum in New York; that year she also received an Honorary Degree from the American University of Beirut.

In 2008, she was ranked 69th on the Forbes list of "The World's 100 Most Powerful Women". In 2010, she was named by Time as an influential thinker in the 2010 TIME 100 issue. In September 2010 the New Statesman listed Zaha Hadid at number 42 in its annual survey of "The World's 50 Most Influential Figures of 2010".

In 2013, she was assessed as one of the 100 most powerful women in the UK by Woman's Hour on BBC Radio 4. In 2014, 2015 and 2016, Hadid appeared on Debrett's list of the most influential people in the UK. In January 2015, she was nominated for the Services to Science and Engineering award at the British Muslim Awards.

She won the Stirling Prize, the UK's most prestigious award for architecture, two years running: in 2010, for one of her most celebrated works, the MAXXI in Rome, and in 2011 for the Evelyn Grace Academy, a Z‑shaped school in Brixton, London. She also designed the Dongdaemun Design Plaza & Park in Seoul, South Korea, which was the centrepiece of the festivities for the city's designation as World Design Capital 2010. In 2014, the Heydar Aliyev Cultural Centre, designed by her, won the Design Museum Design of the Year Award, making her the first woman to win the top prize in that competition.

On 3 February 2016 Hadid became the first woman in her own right to receive the Royal Institute of British Architects Royal Gold Medal.

In 2016 in Antwerp, Belgium a square was named after her, Zaha Hadidplein, in front of the extension of the Antwerp Harbour House designed by Zaha Hadid.

Google celebrated her achievements with a Doodle on 31 May 2017, to commemorate the date (in 2004) on which Hadid became the first woman to win the prestigious Pritzker Architecture Prize.

- 1982: Gold Medal Architectural Design, British Architecture for 59 Eaton Place, London
- 1994: Erich Schelling Architecture Award
- 2001: Équerre d'argent Prize, special mention
- 2002: Austrian State Prize for Architecture for Bergiselschanze
- 2003: European Union Prize for Contemporary Architecture for the Strasbourg tramway terminus and car park in Hoenheim, France
- 2003: Commander of the Civil Division of the Order of the British Empire (CBE) for services to architecture
- 2004: Pritzker Prize
- 2005: Austrian Decoration for Science and Art
- 2005: German Architecture Prize for the central building of the BMW plant in Leipzig
- 2005: Designer of the Year Award for Design Miami
- 2005: RIBA European Award for BMW Central Building
- 2006: RIBA European Award for Phaeno Science Centre
- 2007: Thomas Jefferson Medal in Architecture
- 2008: RIBA European Award for Nordpark Cable Railway
- 2009: Praemium Imperiale
- 2010: RIBA European Award for MAXXI
- 2012: Jane Drew Prize for her "outstanding contribution to the status of women in architecture"
- 2012: Jury member for the awarding of the Pritzker Prize to Wang Shu in Los Angeles.
- 2013: 41st Winner of the Veuve Clicquot UK Business Woman Award
- 2013: Elected international member, American Philosophical Society
- She was also on the editorial board of the Encyclopædia Britannica.

== Zaha Hadid Foundation ==
In 2026, to mark the tenth anniversary of Hadid’s death, the Zaha Hadid Foundation reopened her former headquarters at 10 Bowling Green Lane in Clerkenwell, London, as a public cultural space for architecture, design and the related arts. The building, a Grade II-listed Victorian schoolhouse dating from the early 1870s, was renovated by Katherine Nolan and Alex Butterworth of the London-based Studio KA, and includes galleries, a learning space, a lecture hall and a collection display, and is intended to host exhibitions, talks, workshops and creative residencies.

== List of architectural works ==
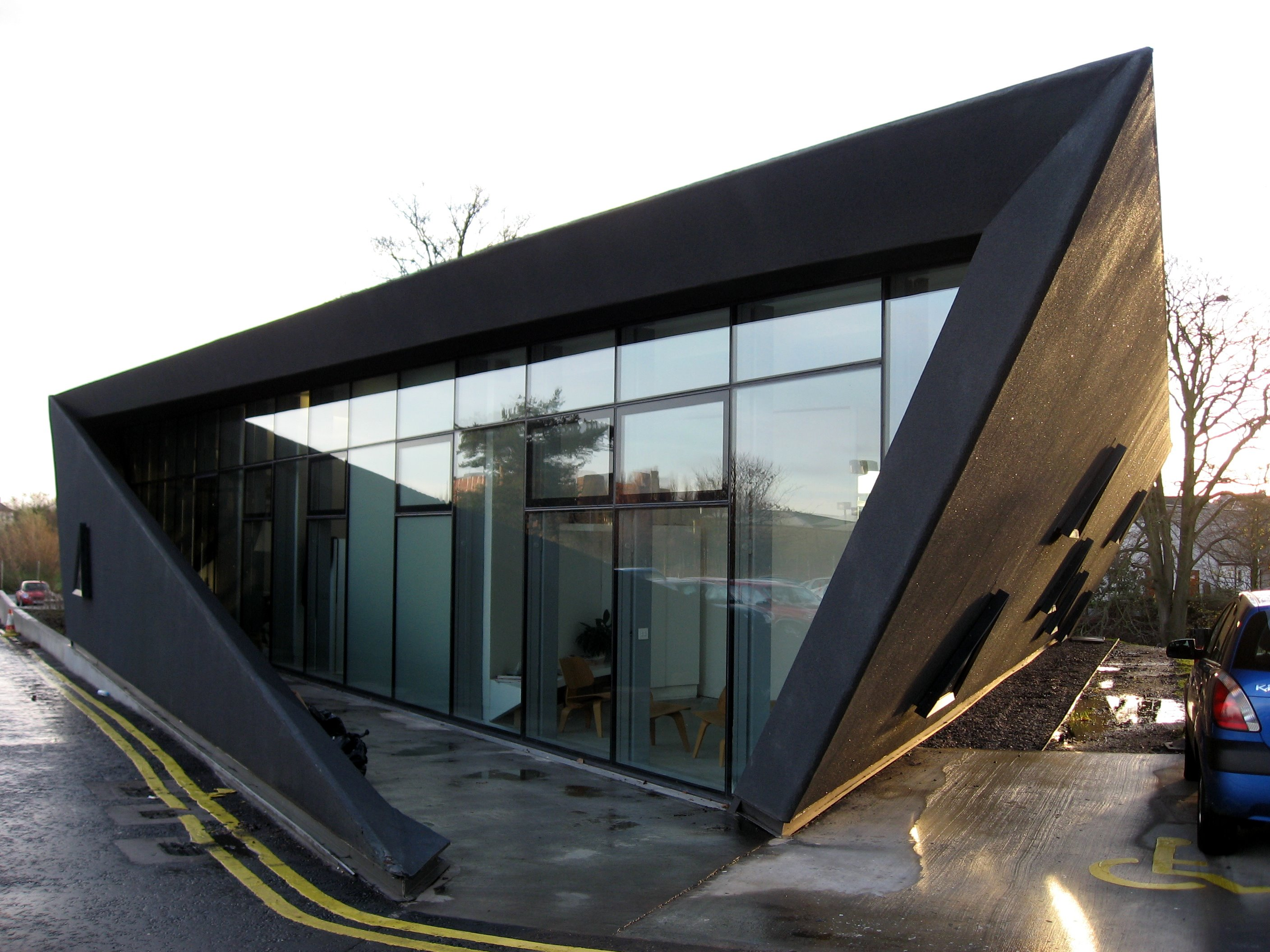
Maggie's Centre, Kirkcaldy, Scotland

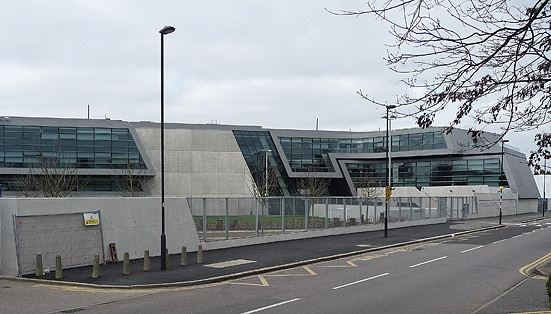
Evelyn Grace Academy, London

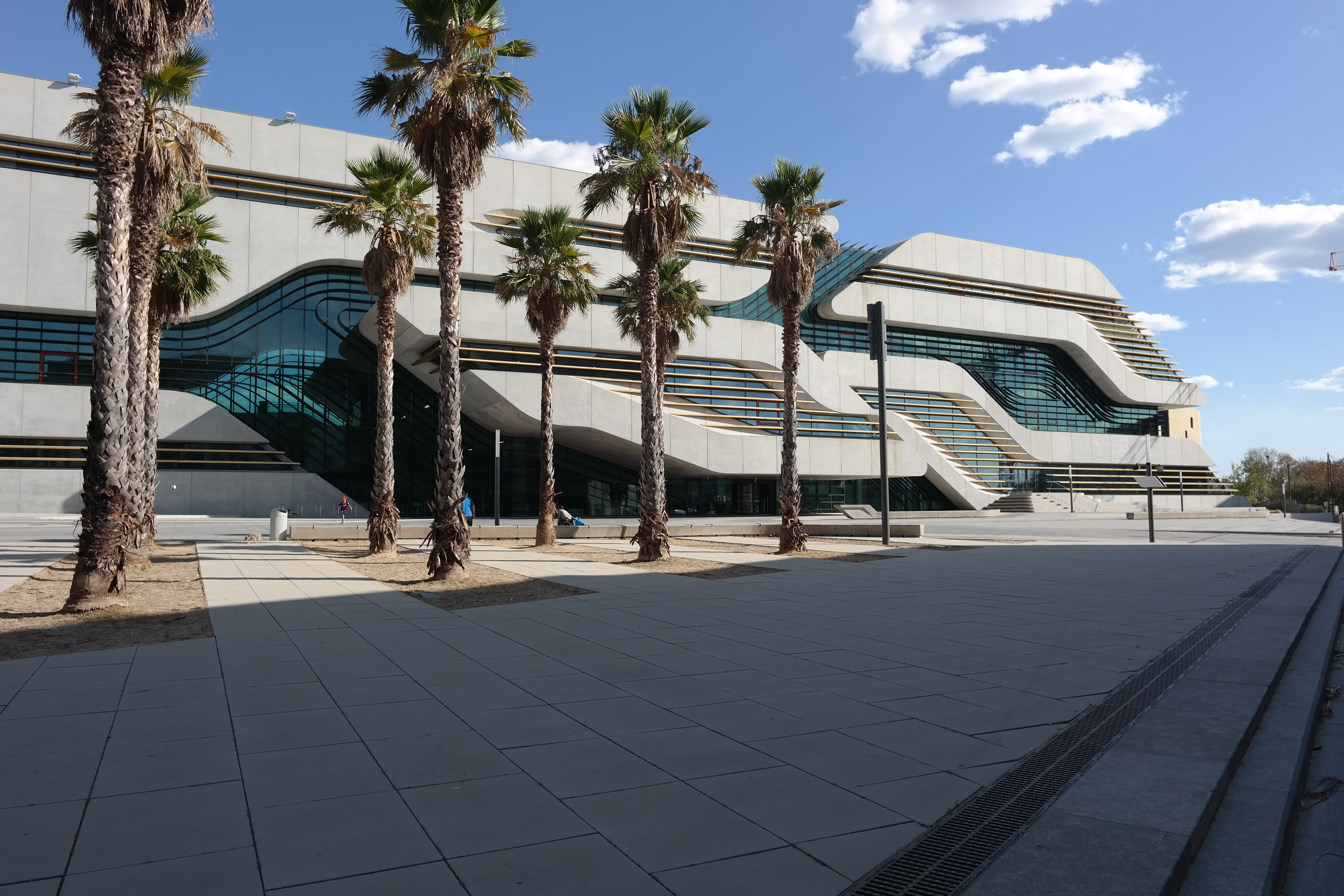
Pierres Vives Building in Montpellier, France

=== Conceptual projects ===
- Malevich's Tektonik (1976–77), London, UK
- Museum of the nineteenth century (1977–78), London, UK
- Dutch Parliament Extension (1978–79), The Hague, Netherlands
- Irish Prime Minister's Residence (1979–80), Dublin, Ireland
- Hafenstraße Development (1989), Hamburg, Germany
- Cardiff Bay Opera House (1995), Cardiff, Wales – not realised
- Price Tower the extension hybrid project (2002), Bartlesville, Oklahoma, United States – pending
- Signature Towers (2006)
- Kartal-Pendik Masterplan (2006), Istanbul, Turkey
- Bahrain International Circuit (2007), Sakhir, Bahrain
- Surfers Paradise Transit Centre Site (2007), Surfers Paradise, Queensland, Australia

=== Completed projects (selection) ===
- Vitra Fire Station (1994), Weil am Rhein, Germany
- Bergisel Ski Jump (2002), Innsbruck, Austria
- Rosenthal Center for Contemporary Art (2003), Cincinnati, Ohio, United States
- Hotel Silken Puerta América (2003–2005), Madrid, Spain
- BMW Central Building (2005), Leipzig, Germany
- Extension of Ordrupgaard Museum (2005), Copenhagen, Denmark
- Phaeno Science Center (2005), Wolfsburg, Germany
- R. Lopez De Heredia Wine Pavilion (2001–2006), Haro, La Rioja, Spain
- Issam Fares Institute for Public Policy and International Affairs at the American University of Beirut (2006–14), Beirut, Lebanon
- Maggie's Centres at the Victoria Hospital (2006), Kirkcaldy, Scotland
- Hungerburgbahn new stations (2007), Innsbruck, Austria
- Chanel Mobile Art Pavilion (2006–08), worldwide
- Bridge Pavilion (2008), Zaragoza, Spain
- Pierresvives (2002–12), Montpellier, France
- MAXXI – National Museum of the 21st Century Arts (1998–2010), Rome, Italy. Stirling Prize 2010 winner.
- Guangzhou Opera House (2010), Guangzhou, People's Republic of China
- Sheikh Zayed Bridge (2007–10), Abu Dhabi, United Arab Emirates
- Galaxy SOHO in Beijing, China.
- London Aquatics Centre (2011), 2012 Summer Olympics, London, United Kingdom
- Riverside Museum (2004–11) development of Glasgow Transport Museum, Scotland
- Deutsche Guggenheim (2005), Berlin, Germany
- CMA CGM Tower (2006–11), Marseille, France
- Ark Evelyn Grace Academy (2006–10) in Brixton, London, UK. Stirling Prize 2011 winner.
- Capital Hill Residence (2006), in Moscow, Russia. Private home owned by Vladislav Doronin.
- Urban Nebula (2007), London Design Festival, London, UK
- Lilas (2007), Serpentine Gallery, London, UK
- Roca London Gallery (2009–11) in Chelsea Harbour, London, UK
- d'Leedon, Singapore (2007–2011)
- Design For Proposed Museum In Vilnius (2007–2011), Vilnius, Lithuania
- Heydar Aliyev Cultural Centre (2007–12) in Baku, Azerbaijan.
- Eli and Edythe Broad Art Museum (2010–12), Michigan State University, East Lansing, Michigan, United States
- Mandarin Oriental Dellis Cay, Villa D (2012) (private home under construction), Dellis Cay, Turks and Caicos Islands
- Library and Learning Center of the Vienna University of Economics and Business Campus (2010–2013)
- Salerno Maritime Terminal (2007–13), Salerno, Italy
- Napoli Afragola railway station, Italy (2013)
- Jockey Club Innovation Tower (2013), Hong Kong
- Dongdaemun Design Plaza (2008–14), Seoul, South Korea
- Citylife office tower (Storto) and residentials, Milan, Italy (2014)
- Investcorp Building, St Antony's College, Oxford (2013–15), UK.
- King Abdullah Petroleum Studies and Research Center, Riyadh, Saudi Arabia (2010–15)
- Nanjing International Youth Cultural Centre, China (2016)
- Antwerp Harbour House, Antwerp, Belgium (2016)
- The Opus, Dubai, UAE (2007–2018)
- Scorpion Tower, One Thousand Museum, Miami, Florida, US (2018)
- 520 West 28th Street, New York City, United States (2017)
- Messner Mountain Museum, Corones, province of Bozen, South Tyrol, Italy (2015)
- Sky Park Residence, Bratislava, Slovakia (2016–2024)

==== Incomplete projects ====
Vilnius Guggenheim Hermitage Museum in 2008. In 2010, commissioned by the Iraqi government to design the new building for the Central Bank of Iraq. An agreement to complete the design stages of the new CBI building was finalised on 2 February 2012, at a ceremony in London. This was her first project in her native Iraq. In 2012, Hadid won an international competition to design a new National Olympic Stadium as part of the successful bid by Tokyo to host the 2020 Summer Olympics. As the estimated cost of the construction mounted, however, Japanese Prime Minister Shinzō Abe announced in July 2015 that Hadid's design was scrapped in favour of a new bidding process to seek a less expensive alternative. Hadid had planned to enter the new competition, but her firm was unable to meet the new requirement of finding a construction company with which to partner.

- 600 Collins Street, Melbourne, Australia
- Mercury House Tower, St Julians, Malta
- Nuragic and Contemporary art museum (on hold), Cagliari, Italy
- Dubai Opera, Dubai, UAE
- Eleftheria square (Freedom Square) in Nicosia, Cyprus
- Esfera City Center in Monterrey, Mexico
- New Century City Art Center, Chengdu, China
- Dominion Tower in Moscow, Russia
- Danjiang Bridge in New Taipei, Taiwan
- Iraqi Parliament Building in Baghdad
- 2014 Qatar 2022 FIFA World Cup stadium design
- 2016 Winton (Mathematics) Gallery at the Science Museum, London
- 2017 666 Fifth Avenue, New York, USA
- California Residence, California, USA
- Middle East Centre. St Antony's College, Oxford, UK
- Regium Waterfront, Reggio, Italy
- Dubai Financial Market, Dubai, UAE
- Signature Towers, Dubai, UAE

=== Non-architectural work ===
==== Museum exhibitions ====
- 1978 – Guggenheim Museum, New York
- 1983 – Retrospective at the Architectural Association, London
- 1985 – GA Gallery, Tokyo
- 1988 – Deconstructivist Architecture show at Museum of Modern Art, New York
- 1995 – Graduate School of Design at Harvard University
- 1997 – San Francisco MoMA
- 2000 – British Pavilion at the Venice Biennale
- 2001 – Kunstmuseum Wolfsburg
- 2002 – (10 May – 11 August) – Centro nazionale per le arti contemporanee, Rome
- 2003 – (4 May – 17 August) – MAK – Museum für angewandte Kunst (Museum of Applied Arts) in Vienna
- 2006 – (3 June – 25 October) – Solomon R. Guggenheim Museum, New York
- 2006 – (1 June – 29 July) – Ma10 Mx Protetch Gallery, Chelsea, New York
- 2007 – (29 June – 25 November) – Design Museum, London
- 2007 – Dune Formations with David Gill Gallery – Venice Biennale
- 2011/12 – (20 September – 25 March) – Zaha Hadid: Form in Motion at the Philadelphia Museum of Art
- 2012 – Liquid Glacial – David Gill Gallery, London
- 2013 – (29 June – 29 September) – Zaha Hadid: World Architecture at the Danish Architecture Centre
- 2015 – (27 June – 27 September) – Zaha Hadid at the State Hermitage Museum, Saint Petersburg, Russia

==== Other work ====
- Nightlife (1999). Zaha Hadid designed the stage set for the Pet Shop Boys' world tour.
- A Day with Zaha Hadid (2004). A 52-minute documentary where Zaha Hadid discusses her current work while taking the camera through her retrospective exhibition "Zaha Hadid has Arrived". Directed by Michael Blackwood.
- In October 2008, she guest-edited Wallpaper magazine.
- On 2 January 2009, she was the guest editor of the BBC's flagship morning radio news programme, Today.

== See also ==
- Category:Zaha Hadid buildings
- Iraqi art
- List of Iraqi artists
- List of Iraqi women artists

== Bibliography ==
- Taschen, Aurelia, ed. (2016). L'Architecture Moderne de A à Z (in French). Taschen, Balthazar. Bibliotheca Universalis. ISBN 978-3-8365-5630-9.
- Fontana-Giusti, Gordana and Schumacher, Patrik. (2004). Complete Works of Zaha Hadid, 4 volumes, Thames and Hudson, Rizzoli, published in English, translated into German and Spanish. ISBN 0-500-34200-8
- Jodidio, Philip (2016). Zaha Hadid (in French). Taschen. ISBN 978-3-8365-3626-4.
