= List of works by Zaha Hadid =

List of works by British-Iraqi architect

This is a list of projects, both realised and unrealised, by British-Iraqi architect Zaha Hadid.

== Projects ==
Image	Title	Year	Location	Country	Status	Description
	Malevich's Tektonik	1976-1977	London	United Kingdom	Conceptual	Fourth-year student design project for a hotel on the Hungerford Bridge over the Thames.
	Museum of the Nineteenth Century	1977–1978	London	United Kingdom	Conceptual	Fifth-year student design thesis; "one of my first ideological and conjectural projects".
	Dutch Parliament Extension	1978–1979	The Hague	The Netherlands	Conceptual	Extension of the Binnenhof complex for parliamentary accommodation. With Rem Koolhaas and Elia Zenghelis.
	Irish Prime Minister's Residence	1979–1980	Dublin, Phoenix Park	Ireland	Conceptual	Residence and state function room for the Taoiseach. "The objective was to create a weightlessness, freedom from the stress of public life."
	59 Eaton Place	1981–1982	London	United Kingdom	Not realised.	Renovation of a turn-of-the-century town house. Hadid received the Gold Medal for Architectural Design, British Architecture for this design.
	Parc de la Villette	1982–1983	Paris	France	Not realised.	Design of a park housing public facilities devoted to science and music and located outside central Paris. Bernard Tschumi's project eventually won the competition.
	The Peak	1982–1983	Hong Kong, Victoria Peak	Hong Kong	Not realised.	Proposal to re-design the Peak with a cliff-top resort characterised by a "Suprematist geology". The project won the international competition's first prize, in part because of Hadid's spectacular drawings and paintings, and catapulted Hadid to international fame. It was never executed on account of complications associated with the transfer of sovereignty over Hong Kong.
	Grand Buildings	1985	London, Trafalgar Square	United Kingdom	Not realised.	Re-design of Trafalgar Square and the buildings surrounding it with towers that "appear to mutate from shards that penetrate the square's surface into a single solid mass".
	Melbury Court	1985	London	United Kingdom	Not realised.	Re-design of a small flat aiming to "explode the rigid box rooms" and featuring furniture on tracks or pivots for flexibility.
	Hamburg Docklands	1986	Hamburg	West Germany	Not realised.	Masterplan for the redevelopment of the harbour area, particularly the Speicherstadt.
	Kurfürstendamm 70	1986	Berlin	East Germany	Not realised.	Office building on a very narrow site (2.7 × 16 metres).
	Azabu-Jyuban	1986	Tokyo, Azabu Juban	Japan	Not realised.	Commercial development on a "narrow site in a canyon of random buildings near the Roppongi district."
	Tomigaya	1986	Tokyo, Azabu Juban	Japan	Not realised.	Small mixed-use project related to the Azabu-Jyuban project, featuring an elevated angular glass pavilion as its centerpiece.
	West Hollywood Civic Centre	1987	Los Angeles, Azabu Juban	United States	Not realised.	Design for a civic centre in a "relatively context-free environment", allowing "objects [to] float and interact in a way that is only possible in wide-open spaces".
	Al Wahda Sports Centre	1988	Abu Dhabi	United Arab Emirates	Not realised.	
	Berlin 2000	1988	Berlin	East Germany	Not realised.	Urban masterplan for a Berlin without the Berlin Wall, commissioned a year before the Wall's actual fall.
	Victoria City Areal	1988	Berlin	East Germany	Not realised.	Design for a re-development of a cruciform site on Kurfürstendamm, envisioning a "bent slab" of a hotel hovering above the street.
	A New Barcelona	1989	Barcelona	Spain	Not realised.	Project of a "new urban geometry" for Barcelona based on the diagonal axes of Cerdà's 19th century plan, which are twisted into "skewed, interlocking fragments".
	Tokyo Forum	1989	Tokyo	Japan	Not realised.	Design for a municipal Cultural Centre, based on a "void - a glass container - out of which smaller voids are dramatically hollowed and which house the building's cultural and conference areas.
	Hafenstrasse development	1990	Hamburg, Hafenstraße	Germany	Not realised.	Project of a mixed-use development in two gaps in a row of houses on the Elbe embankment, featuring angular, semi-transparent slabs on pillars.
	Moonsoon	1989–1990	Sapporo	Japan	Built	Interior design of a restaurant with tables like "sharp fragments of ice" and a "plasma of biomorphic sofas".
	Folly 3	1990	Osaka	Japan	Built (Temporary)	Folly in the grounds of the Expo '90 fair, a "series of compressed and fused elements to expand in the landscape and refract pedestrian movement." Hadid describes the sculpture as a "half scale experiment for the Vitra Fire Station".
	IBA housing	1986–1993	Berlin, Stresemannstraße 109. 52.5063°N 13.3797°E	East Germany	Built	3-floor housing development with a wedge-shaped, metal-clad 8-floor tower for the Internationale Bauausstellung. This, together with the Vitra Fire Station, was Hadid's first realised project. Hadid was one of three women commissioned to design social housing complexes, following the efforts of the Feministische Organisation von Planerinnen und Architektinnen to increase female contributions to the IBA program.
	Vitra Fire Station	1994	Weil am Rhein	West Germany	Built	
	Cardiff Bay Opera House	1995	Cardiff, Wales	United Kingdom	Not realised.	
	Serpentine Gallery Pavilion	2000	London	United Kingdom	Built (Temporary)	
	Hoenheim-North Terminus & Car Park	2001	Hoenheim	France	Built	
	One-North Masterplan	2001	Singapore	Singapore	Ongoing	
	Bergisel Ski Jump	2002	Innsbruck	Austria	Built	
	Rosenthal Center for Contemporary Art	2003	Cincinnati, Ohio	United States	Built	
	Ordrupgaard Museum extension	2001-2005	Copenhagen	Denmark	Built	
	BMW Central Building	2005	Leipzig	Germany	Built	
	Phaeno Science Center	2005	Wolfsburg	Germany	Built	
	Szervita Square Tower	2006	Budapest	Hungary	Not realised.	
	Issam Fares Institute for Public Policy and International Affairs	2006-14	Beirut	Lebanon	Built	
	Kartal-Pendik Waterfront Regeneration Masterplan	2006	Istanbul	Turkey	Not realised.	
	Maggie's Centres at the Victoria Hospital	2006	Kirkcaldy, Scotland	United Kingdom	Built	
	Tondonia Winery Pavilion	2001-2006	Haro	Spain	Built	
	Eleftheria Square redesign	2007	Nicosia	Cyprus	Delayed	The park's construction has been ongoing for over a decade due to various controversies including local criticism of the design, archaeological findings in the building site, EU funding issues, and problems with the various construction firms contracted to build the project.
	Hungerburgbahn stations	2007	Innsbruck	Austria	Built	
	Vilnius Guggenheim Hermitage Museum	2008	Vilnius	Lithuania	Not realised.	
	Bridge Pavilion	2008	Zaragoza	Spain	Built	
	JS Bach Chamber Music Hall	2009	Manchester, England	United Kingdom	Built (Temporary)	A temporary structure made for the Manchester International Festival.
	CMA CGM Tower	2005-2010	Marseille	France	Built	
	MAXXI - National Museum of the 21st Century Arts	1998-2010	Rome	Italy	Built	Winner of the 2010 Stirling Prize
	Guangzhou Opera House	2005-2010	Guangzhou	China	Built	
	Evelyn Grace Academy	2006-2010	Brixton, London	United Kingdom	Built	Winner of the 2011 Stirling Prize
	Sheikh Zayed Bridge	2007-2010	Abu Dhabi	United Arab Emirates	Built	
	London Aquatics Centre	2008-2011	London	United Kingdom	Built	
	Riverside Museum	2007-2011	Glasgow, Scotland	United Kingdom	Built	
	Capital Hill Residence	2011	Barvikha Forest, Moscow	Russia	Built	This private residence was built for Russian real estate developer Vladislav Doronin and is the only private residence Hadid designed in her lifetime.
	Central Bank of Iraq Tower	2011	Baghdad	Iraq	Under construction/Ongoing	Designed in 2011, Proposed in 2012. Construction began in 2019, estimated completion in 2025.
	Durango railway station (and Euskotren headquarters)	2004-2012	Durango, Basque Country	Spain	Partially built	Railway station built; train operator office shelved.
	Heydar Aliyev Cultural Center	2007-2012	Baku	Azerbaijan	Built	
	Broad Art Museum	2007-2012	East Lansing, Michigan	United States	Built	Contemporary art museum associated with Michigan State University.
	Pierres Vives Building	2002-2012	Montpellier	France	Built	
	Galaxy SOHO	2008-2012	Beijing	China	Built	A single urban complex building inspired by Chinese courtyards.
	Innovation Tower	2009-2013	Hong Kong	China	Built	
	Serpentine Sackler Gallery	2013	London	United Kingdom	Built	
	Learning Center, Vienna University of Economics and Business	2010-2013	Vienna	Austria	Built	
	Dongdaemun Design Plaza & Park	2007-2014	Dongdaemun, Seoul	South Korea	Built	
	Wangjing SOHO	2009-2014	Beijing	China	Built	A complex of office buildings inspired by folding Chinese fans and containing the third-tallest woman-designed building in the world.
	Grace on Coronation	2014	Brisbane	Australia	Proposed	3 residential skyscrapers with civic space within a new riverside park.
	Dominion Tower	2008-2015	Moscow	Russia	Built	
	Investcorp Building, St Antony's College	2013-2015	Oxford, England	United Kingdom	Built	
	Messner Mountain Museum Corones	2015	Kronplatz mountain	Italy	Built	Sixth addition to the Messner Mountain Museum.
	Nanjing International Youth Cultural Center	2015	Nanjing	China	Built	A pair of skyscrapers constructed in honor of the Youth Olympic Games.
	600 Collins Street	2015	Melbourne	Australia	Proposed	
	Port Authority Building (Havenhuis)	2016	Antwerp	Belgium	Built	Central headquarters of the Antwerp Port Authority. Hadid's extension is built on top of a firehouse designed by 19th-century Dutch architect Emiel Van Averbeke.
	Napoli Afragola railway station	2003-2017	Naples	Italy	Built	Central rail terminal serving the comune of Afragola in the metropolitan area of Naples, Italy.
	Salerno Maritime Terminal	1999-2016	Salerno	Italy	Built	
	520 West 28th Street	2014–2017	New York City	United States	Built	A residential building adjacent to the High Line in the Chelsea neighborhood of Manhattan.
	King Abdullah Petroleum Studies and Research Center (KAPSARC)	2009-2017	Riyadh	Saudi Arabia	Built	A 70,000 square meter research center.
	The Opus, Omniyat	2012-2019	Dubai	United Arab Emirates	Built	
	Beijing Daxing International Airport	2014-2019	Beijing	China	Built	The second airport serving Beijing.
	BEEHA Group headquarters	2017-2022	Sharjah	United Arab Emirates	Built	
	Masaryčka	2015–2023	Prague	Czech Republic	Built	Mixed-use building.
	KAFD (Riyadh Metro)	2012 - 2024	Riyadh	Saudi Arabia	Built	
	Sky Park Residence	2016-2024	Bratislava	Slovakia	Built	Four identical 31-storey residential towers measuring 105 metres (355 ft) tall, in the Sky Park complex neighbouring Bratislava city centre.
	Sky Park Tower	2024-	Bratislava	Slovakia	Ongoing	The tower with different design then other four identical Sky Park Residence buildings is under construction in Bratislava. The last and tallest Sky Park 33-storey residential tower which is set to reach a height of 119 metres (390 ft) tall in the Sky Park complex will be the third tallest building in Slovakia.
