= Ojo del Sol =

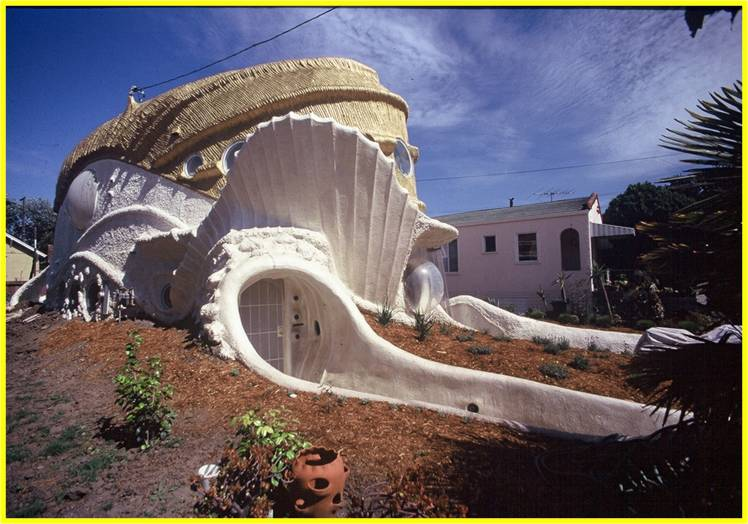

- Location within Oakland, California Location within California
- Alternative names: The Tsui House; The Fish House; Tai Yang Yen
- Etymology: Spanish, 'Eye of the Sun'

General information
- Type: Single family dwelling
- Architectural style: Biomimetic architecture
- Location: 2747 Mathews Street, Berkeley, California, US
- Coordinates: 37°51′22″N 122°17′8″W
- Construction started: 1993
- Completed: 1995
- Cost: US$250,000
- Owner: Florence Tsui

Technical details
- Material: Insulating concrete forms; concrete; hardwall; structural plaster; Stucco; marine fiberglass; douglas fir; birch veneer plywood
- Floor area: 2,200 square feet (200 m^{2})

Design and construction
- Architect: Eugene Tsui

Website
- www.tdrinc.com/tsuihs.html

Ojo del Sol, also called The Fish House by local residents, is a home designed in 1993 by architect Eugene Tssui. The building was constructed between 1994 and 1995 in a residential neighborhood of Berkeley, California. The home's name, Spanish for 'Eye of the Sun', originates from the fifteen-foot diameter eye-like window that faces south. According to the architect, the structure is based upon the world's most indestructible living creature, the tardigrade.

== The building ==
=== Design and construction ===
The building's design is centered around durability, ecology, and sustainability. The building is said to draw upon the physiology of the tardigrade, a creature known for its durability, for its structural strength. In addition, the walls are angled inward at 4 degrees to "create a compressive structure with a low center of gravity further aiding in resistance to lateral turnover forces produced by strong earthquakes." A variety of both standard and non-standard building materials were used including: Concrete, insulating concrete forms, hardwall (a type of gypsum plaster) structural plaster, stucco, non-toxic waterproofing, acrylic, marine fiberglass, douglas fir, recycled wood, and birch veneer plywood.

The house is designed to maintain a comfortable temperature with little power from the grid. "Water in the black tubes is heated by the sun throughout the day. At night the stored heat is radiated back into the interior of the house walls and provides radiant wall heat." For cooling, the house is set 1.5 meters into the ground, eliminating the need for air conditioning.

=== Cost ===
The 2,200 square feet (200 m^{2}) home was built in 1994-1995 for a cost of US$250,000 (equivalent to $528,200 in 2025).

== Style ==
The building style is Nature Inspired Architecture or Biomimetic architecture. Biomimetic elements include:

- The overall draws from the tardigrade, the four-bedroom, two-story Tsui House is elliptical in shape and has parabolic arches.
- The concrete forms create a concrete lattice structure which mimics the skeleton of the Cholla cactus.
- The solar-heating system is based on the bone and vein structure of two dinosaurs, the Dimetrodon and the Stegosaurus.
- The dimpled exterior surface enhances the aerodynamic efficiency by relieving wind friction like fish scales.
