= Internationale Bauausstellung =

German architectural exhibition

An Internationale Bauausstellung (IBA) or International Architecture Exhibition is a German device for urban engineering and architecture, in order to show new concepts in terms of social, cultural and ecologic ideas.

== History ==
- The first one dates to 1901 and was held in Darmstadt.
- In 1913, there was an IBA on the site of today's Alte Messe in Leipzig.
- IBA '57 was organised in Berlin.
- 1979–87 IBA Berlin was an urban renewal project which followed the strategies of "careful urban renewal" and "critical reconstruction". The program inspired the formation of the group Feministische Organisation von Planerinnen und Architektinnen (Feminist Architects and Planners Organisation or FOPA), who objected to its failure to adequately address women-specific issues and involve female designers.
- 1989–99 IBA Emscher Park aimed at restructuring a former industrial region, the Ruhr, by sparking urbanistic, architectural, cultural, and economic incentives.

== Current ==
- 2027 Stuttgart www.IBA27.de
- 2012–20 IBA Parkstad is the first IBA to be held completely outside of Germany, in the former mining region of Parkstad Limburg in the Netherlands. Currently at least 39 projects have been chosen to develop further.
