= Feministische Organisation von Planerinnen und Architektinnen =

German feminist engineering organization

Feministische Organisation von Planerinnen und Architektinnen (Feminist Architects and Planners Organisation or FOPA) is an organisation working to address gender issues in the built environment generally and among professionals active in this field.

== History ==
The group was founded in 1981 in Germany, initially as a protest action in response to the under-representation of women in Berlin's Internationale Bauaustellung (International Building Exhibition or IBA, 1979-1987). After initially "hijacking" official IBA meetings, the group formally established itself a short time later in Berlin, and later expanded to other German cities, developing a strong and influential voice for gender equality, in particular throughout the 1980s and 1990s. Independent regional chapters were established in Dortmund (1985), Hamburg, Bremen, Kassel (1983) and Rhein-Main (Frankfurt). An 11-point charter, titled "Principles for a new spatial order" (Grundlagen für eine neue räumliche Ordnung) and advocating an aspirational planning and development approach based on equal civil, political, economic, cultural and social rights for men and women, was produced as a result of the 1991 European Women Planners Conference in Berlin. The Berlin Charter was published in a special edition of the group's yearly magazine Freie.Räume a short time later. Active members over time have included Veronika Keckstein, Kerstin Dörhöfer, Christiane Erlemann, Ellen Nausester, Marianne Rodenstein and Sabine Pollak.

== Aims and activities ==
FOPA's goals include: developing and promoting feminist positions in architecture, planning and environmental and construction industry politics; addressing gender discrimination against women in the field; increasing women's involvement in planning and development, under the broader aim to change the spatial-built environment for the interests of women and the women's movement.

Between 1983 and 2004, FOPA published the magazine FREI.RÄUME (free spaces) on the subject of feminist theory and practice in the planning, design, architecture and building. The magazine title (Frei.Räume Streitschrift) is itself a play on words that reflects the creators' agenda: merging the German words "Streiten", meaning "to fight", and "Zeitschrift", magazine. The group has also held numerous exhibitions, conferences and seminars.

== Exhibitions, seminars and conferences ==
- "Frauen in der Stadt" (Women in the City), FOPA Dortmund, 1987
- "Frauen Planen Bauen" (Women Design and Build), FOPA Dortmund
- "Wohnungslosigkeit von Frauen" (Women's homelessness), FOPA Dortmund

== Publications ==
FreiRäume Series

- Edition 1, 1983, Analysen und Thesen zur Bedeutung der Architekturgeschichte für feministische Utopien und frauenspezifische Probleme im Wohnumfeld
- Edition 2, 1986
- Edition 3, 1989, Gewalt im öffentlichen Raum / Beteiligung von Frauen in Politik und Planung / Ökologisch orientierte Stadterneuerung, ISBN 3-924352-54-2
- Edition 4, 1990, Frauen in Entwicklungsländern / Rund um die Internationale Bauausstellung Emscher Park, NRW, ISBN 3-924352-55-0
- Edition 5 (Special edition) 1992/93, Raum greifen und Platz nehmen. Dokumentation der 1. Europäischen Planerinnentagung, ISBN 3-905493-39-X
- Edition 6, 1993, Regionalentwicklung - feministische Perspektiven, ISBN 3-905493-46-2
- Edition 7 1994, Entschleunigung - Abkehr von einem Lei(d)tbild: Feministische Reflexionen und Utopien, ISBN 3-89370-201-6
- Edition 8, 1995, Zwischen Abgrenzung und Annäherung: Planerinnen und Planungspraxis in den neuen Bundesländern, ISBN 3-89370-213-X
- Edition 9 1996, Ortswechsel – Blickwechsel: Frauenräume in der Migration, ISBN 3-89370-241-5
- Edition 10 1998, Neue Wege - Neue Ziele: Positionen feministischer Planung, ISBN 3-89370-290-3
- Edition 11 2004, 19,- EUR, ISBN 3-00-014056-5
- Special Edition 1993, Frauen verändern ihre Stadt: Präsenz im Raum, ISBN 3-905493-38-1
- Special Edition 1991, Sicherheit im öffentlichen Raum: Städtebauliche und planerische Maßnahmen zur Verminderung von Gewalt, ISBN 3-905493-16-0

== Other projects ==
- "Emanzipatorisches Wohnen" (Emancipatory Housing) Project, IBA (Berlin), 1986-1993

Under pressure from FOPA, the IBA held a design seminar in 1986 with the aim of addressing the male gender bias in development plans for Berlin, both in terms of limited female participation as designers and a lack of women-specific objectives in the design process. As a result, three female architects, Zaha M. Hadid, Christine Jachmann und Myra Warhaftig, were commissioned to design three of six social housing complexes. All three projects were commissioned by state-run social housing provider DeGeWo. The Hadid building, at Stresemannstraße 109, was the architect's first realised project.

- Archive "Frauen Planen Bauen Wohnen", Universität Dortmund (FOPA Dortmund)

== Related organisations ==
- Association for Women in Architecture and Design, USA
- Women in Architecture, UK
- Parlour, Australia
- Architexx, USA
- Women’s creativity since the Modern Movement
- n-ails: Netzwerk für architektinnen, innenarchitektinnen, landschaftsarchitektinnen und stadtplanerinnen, Germany
