= Eugene Tssui =

American architect

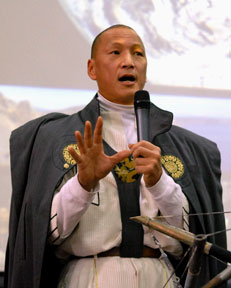
- Tssui giving a lecture
- Born: September 14, 1954 (age 72); Cleveland, Ohio, US
- Occupation: Architect
- Spouse: Elisabeth P. Montgomery
- Website: eugenetssui.com

Eugene Tssui (/tsweɪ/ Chinese: 崔悅君; pinyin: Cuī Yuèjūn born Eugene Tsui, September 14, 1954) is an American architect noted for his use of ecological principles and "biologic" design, a term coined by Tssui himself in the 2010 issue of World Architecture Review. He has proposed a number of projects such as a bridge across the Strait of Gibraltar to connect the continents of Africa and Europe as well as a 2-mile-high tower capable of housing 1 million residents.

== Biography ==
The son of Chinese immigrants, Tssui was born in Cleveland, Ohio, and raised in Minneapolis, Minnesota. He started studying architecture at Columbia University's Graduate School of Design, but left to be apprenticed under architect Bruce Goff. He later completed his bachelor of architecture degree at the University of Oregon, and continued to graduate studies at the University of California, Berkeley, where he earned two masters and a Ph.D.

Tssui is married to educator Elisabeth P. Montgomery.

== Philosophy and style ==
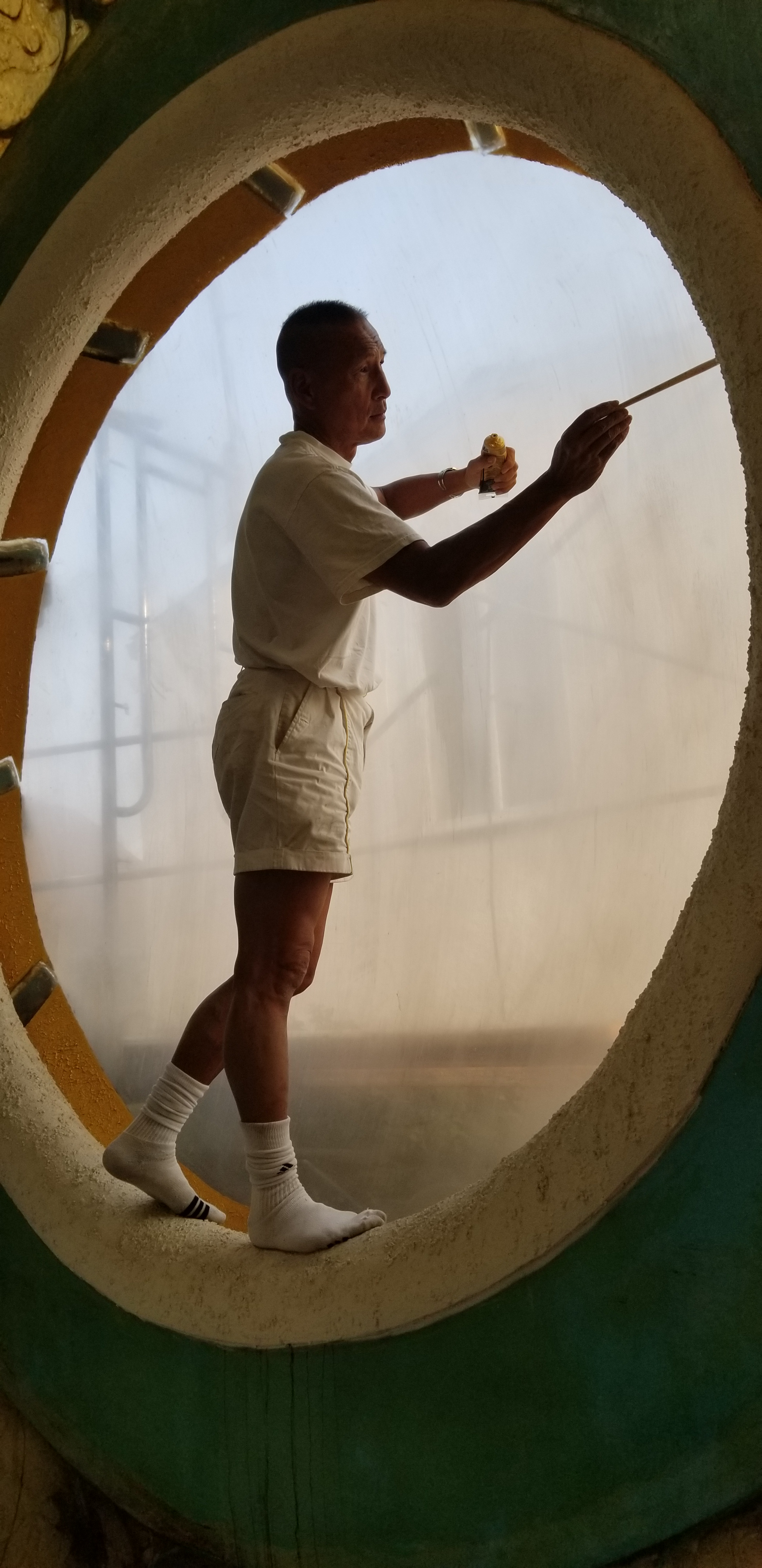
Tssui painting Ojo del Sol

Tssui uses principles of bio-inspired and environmental design with an evolutionary outlook, creating responsive buildings that work in tandem with their environment, preventing and restoring environmental damage, while highlighting human responsibility for environmental and personal health. Tssui refers to this as biologic design. The goal of this approach is to create buildings that take into account environmental challenges, and apply the patterns found in the local environment to solve them and avoid potential adverse results. Some key aspects of Tssui's biologic design include:

- Structures that take into account their surroundings, including materials and conditions
- Aerodynamic shapes which distribute and relieve structural stresses
- Interior design that encourages exercise, health, and fitness
- Efficient ventilation and temperature control systems that depend on natural circulation
- Using locally available construction materials
- Structures whose exterior design and interior workings do not affect the environment adversely

From these tenets, Tssui derives an architectural style that makes use of curvilinear forms, sails, "wings," spherical and egg-shapes structures, and other elements which are highly reflective of the natural world.

Tssui's designs extend to clothing and furniture and often reflect similar concerns about movement, weight, and sustainability as his architectural designs.

== Built projects ==
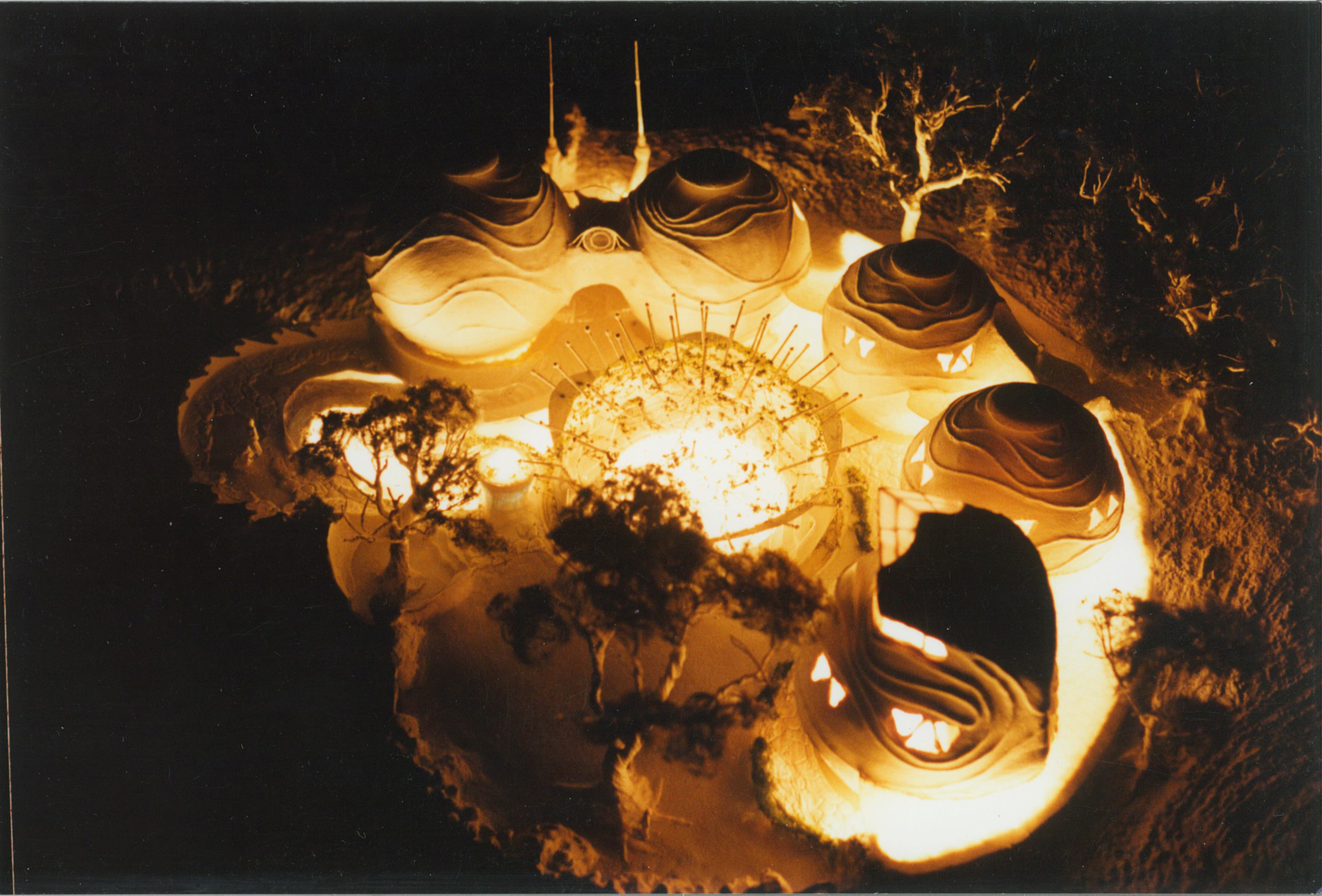
Watsu Center Health School, Napa, California, US, 2002

- The Watsu School at Harbin Hot Springs, "a series of five spherical buildings connected by a string of hallways and surrounded by a trough of cooling water"
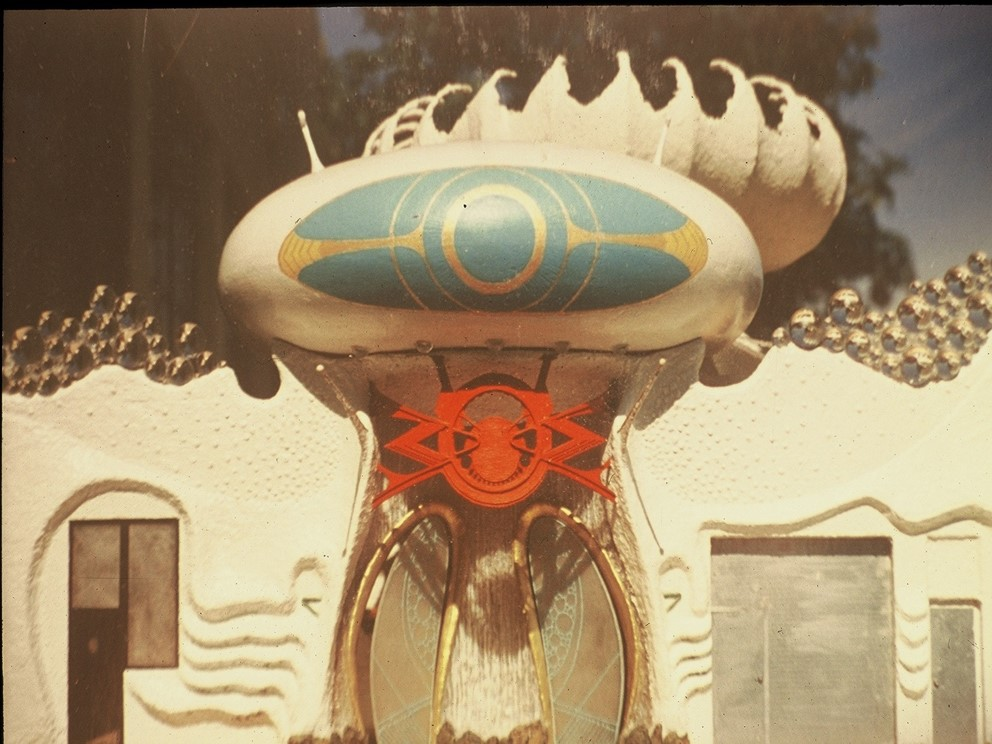
  Tsui Design and Research Headquarters Building, Emeryville, California, US, 1990
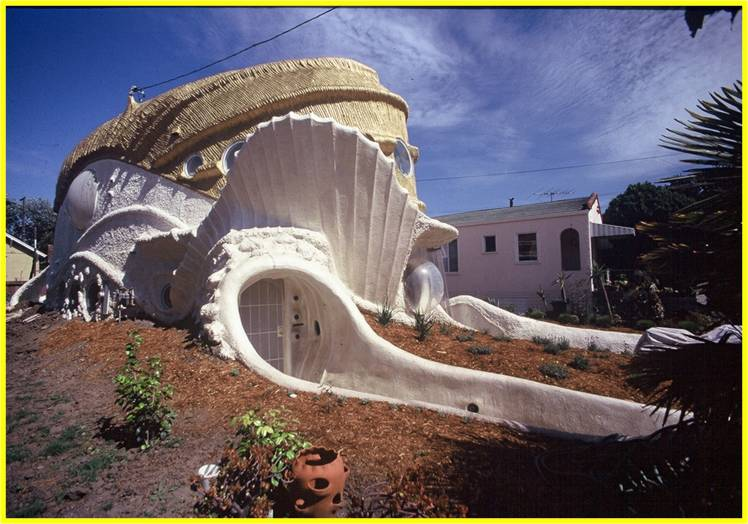
  House for Florence and William Tsui, Berkeley, California, US, 1991
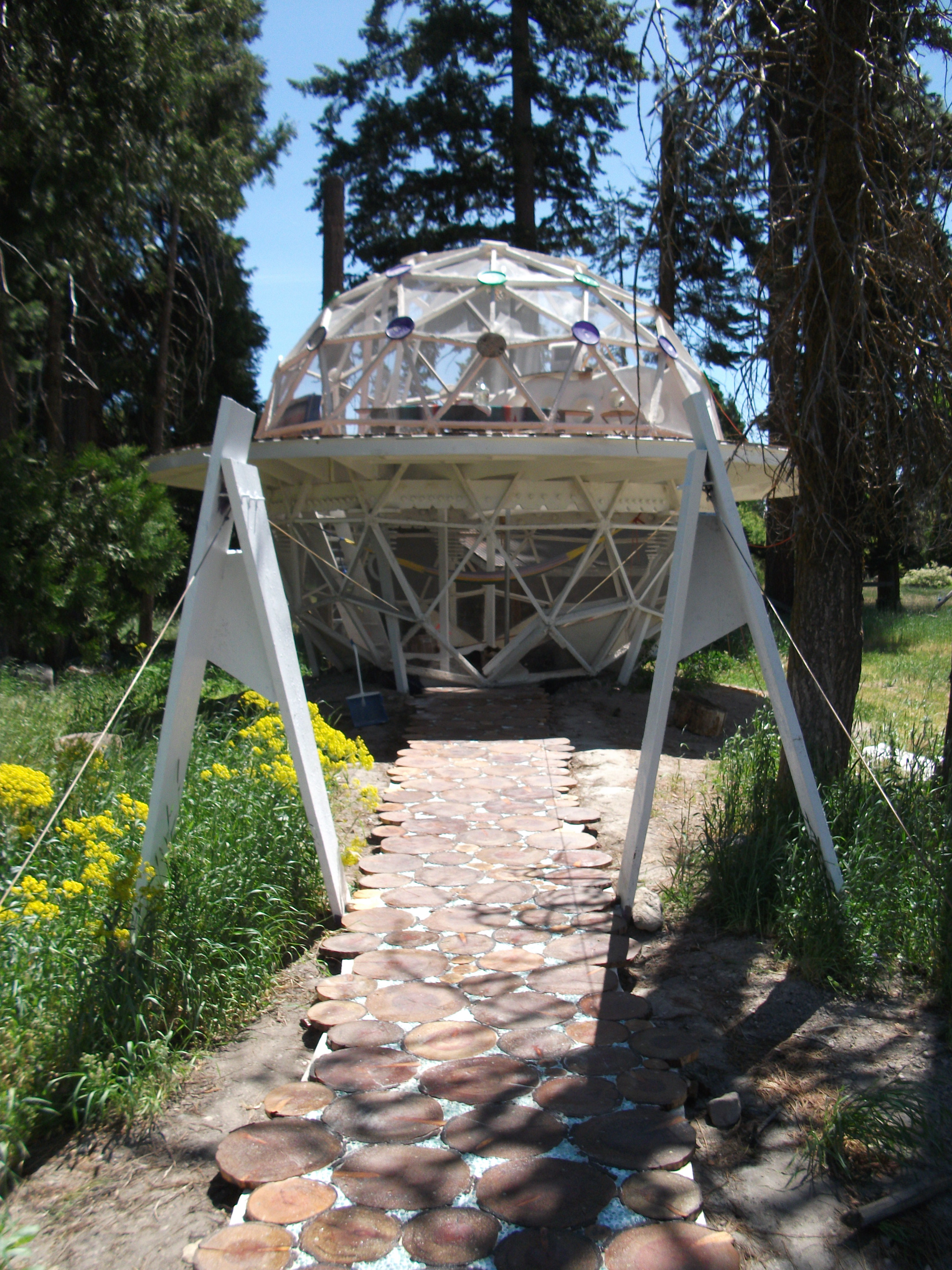
  Zero Energy Dwelling, Mount Shasta, California, US, 2015
- Tsui Design and Research Inc.'s headquarters in Emeryville (completed 1998), a design that utilizes recycled materials for manufacturing, and was built with energy conservation in mind The now defunct office building was subsequently sold in 2007 and demolished, as it was deemed "too unusual to rent."
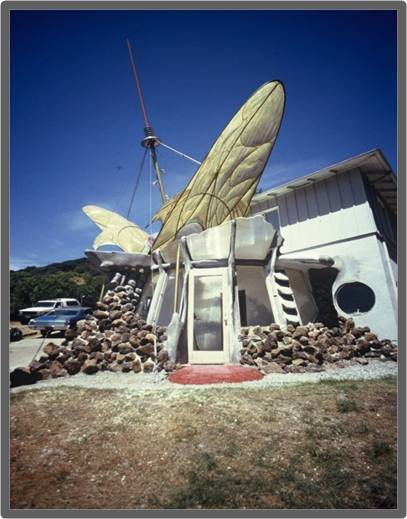
  Reyes Residence, Oakland, California, US, 1993
- The "Fish House" or "Ojo del Sol" ("Eye of the Sun"), Tssui's parents' house in Berkeley, California, known for its unusual shape and structural concept, which is based on the tardigrade. The building's construction materials included inexpensive and recycled materials that draw inspiration from the Cholla cactus. Tssui designed the house with the goal of making it the "safest house in the world," intended to survive fires, earthquakes, flooding, and termites".
- The ZED Residence, a zero-energy dwelling is located at the foothills of Mount Shasta, California. The geodesic dome is designed to maximize the "strength-to-weight" ratio found in many super-strong objects and to dissipate forces from wind, earthquakes, and tsunamis.
- Other projects include his showcase building in Shenzhen, China, known as the Ecological House of the Future; and the Reyes Residence in Oakland, California, which is notable for its dragonfly-like roof ventilation "wings."

== Proposals and city planning projects ==
- The DNA Tower combines business and government offices with vertical gardens to grow food, windmills, and stairwells that act as ventilation.
- The Eye-in-the-Sky Lookout Tower was once designed to be both the tallest tower and greatest renewable energy project worldwide. Measuring 2,340 feet high (710 m), it will be 2 times the height of the Paris France's Eiffel Tower or, similarly, over 3 times the height of Seattle Washington's Space Needle, if built. The viewing deck at the top of the twisting, helix-shaped incline tower would be 5-stories tall with sweeping views for hundreds of miles in every direction, weather permitting. Two additional structures at its base (the "Crystal Exhibition Hall" and the "Globe" which includes a waterfall) were planned with organic food-based restaurants, educational/exhibition halls, and auditoriums for public and private events in mind. Outdoor plazas also afforded live music and movies to the anticipated 10 million tourists the Eye-in-the-Sky was anticipated to draw annually. Equipped with 92 eggbeater wind turbines and 700,000 sq. feet of photovoltaic solar panels, it would generate enough energy to sustain itself and provide the city of Oakland, California, where it had been proposed, with one-fourth of its power needs. It had also been proposed to the city of Shenzhen, China, and carried a price tag of $600 million to build for either at the time, yet estimated to generate $400 million in revenue annually. To note, in Oakland, the base of the tower would be "two square (city) blocks" in size while in Shenzhen, it would be built on an artificial island in the center of the bay. There, surrounded by mangrove trees, windmills would aid in filtering the polluted waters of the city while continuing to consider the health of the environment and local ecology.
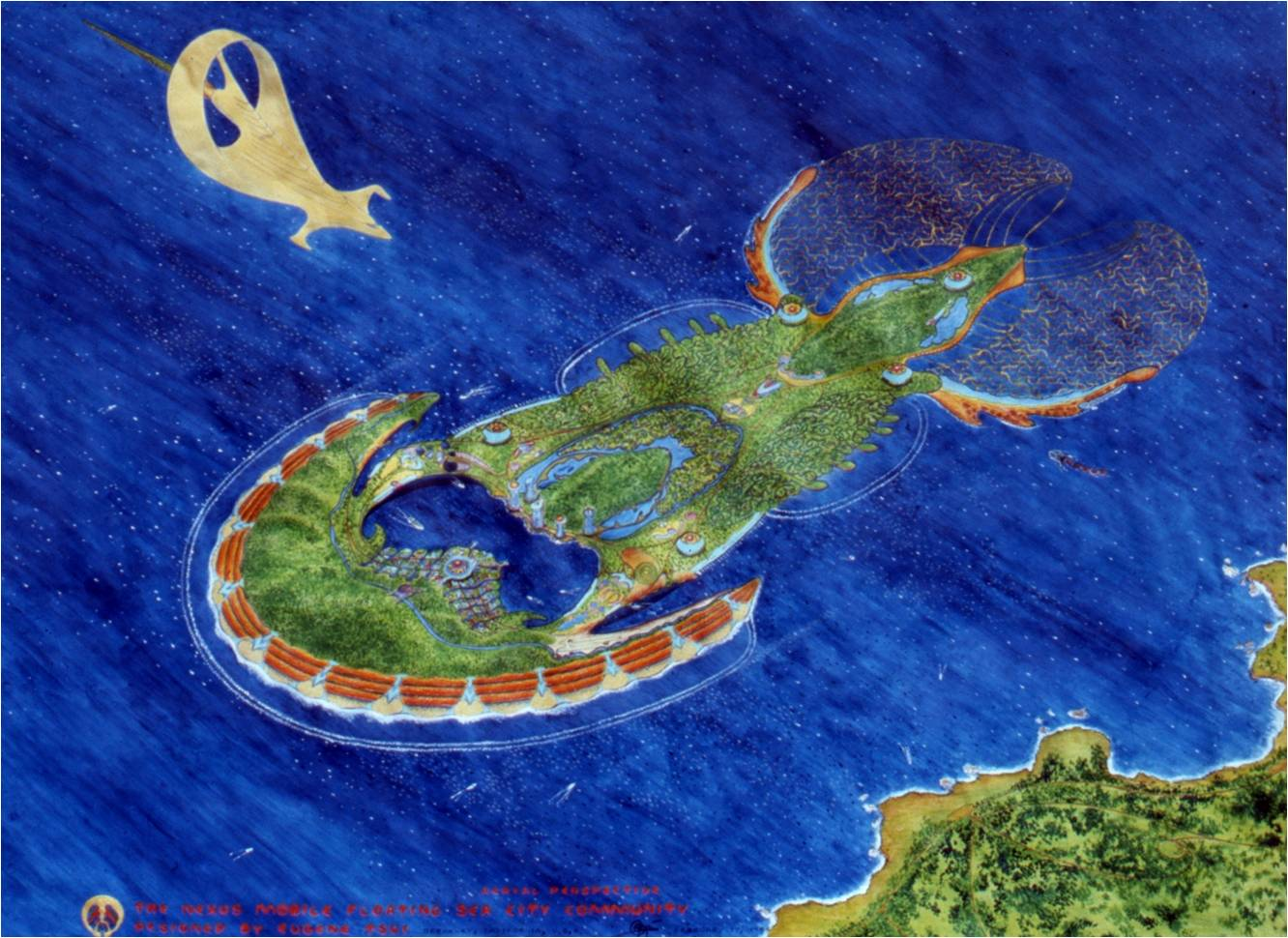
- Nexus Mobile Floating Sea City 1985
  The Nexus Floating Sea City would be 7.6 kilometres (4.7 mi) in length and 4 kilometres (2.5 mi) in width and have the ability to accommodate 100,000 people. Planned for the coast of Florida, the Floating Sea City would be capable of traveling along the coastlines of major continents and have the ability to grow its own food. The sea city is designed with an open bay area and residential neighborhoods accessible by boat or plane. A curved mountain region at the front end of the city will act as a massive concussion-absorbing block to mitigate the destructive forces of tidal waves. Twenty-seven underwater propulsion jets will be powered by propane gas or methane gas and electricity generated by windmills on the surface. The Trilobite shape of the city will minimize drag-effect through the water. The entire city will be able to pivot to face tidal waves head-on with little or no damage. This city design is currently waiting for funding from a client in Florida to begin further design development and construction.
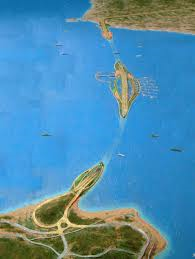
- Strait of Gibraltar Floating Bridge 2005
  The Strait of Gibraltar Floating Bridge, which is intended to span 14.5 kilometres (9.0 mi) in length, includes a floating island replete with business and leisure centers at its midpoint. Measuring 4.8 kilometres (3.0 mi) wide, the man-made island includes a marina, hills, and waterfalls to accommodate individuals wishing to engage in outdoor recreational activities. Equipped with wind-powered and underwater turbines, it is capable of powering most of Morocco and southern Spain. At 24 lanes wide and a price tag of $10 billion, the nicknamed "Afro-tunnel" would connect the continents of Europe and Africa. Its segmented design, reminiscent of a vertebral column, would be partially submerged to a depth of 650 feet to allow the continued use of the Strait of Gibraltar for shipping and commerce.
- Telos Window of the World, a 12,000-square-foot two-story guitar-shaped residence. The project was approved by the Planning Department of the city of San Pablo. The construction budget was $650,000 with a suggested plan of completion for February 2015.
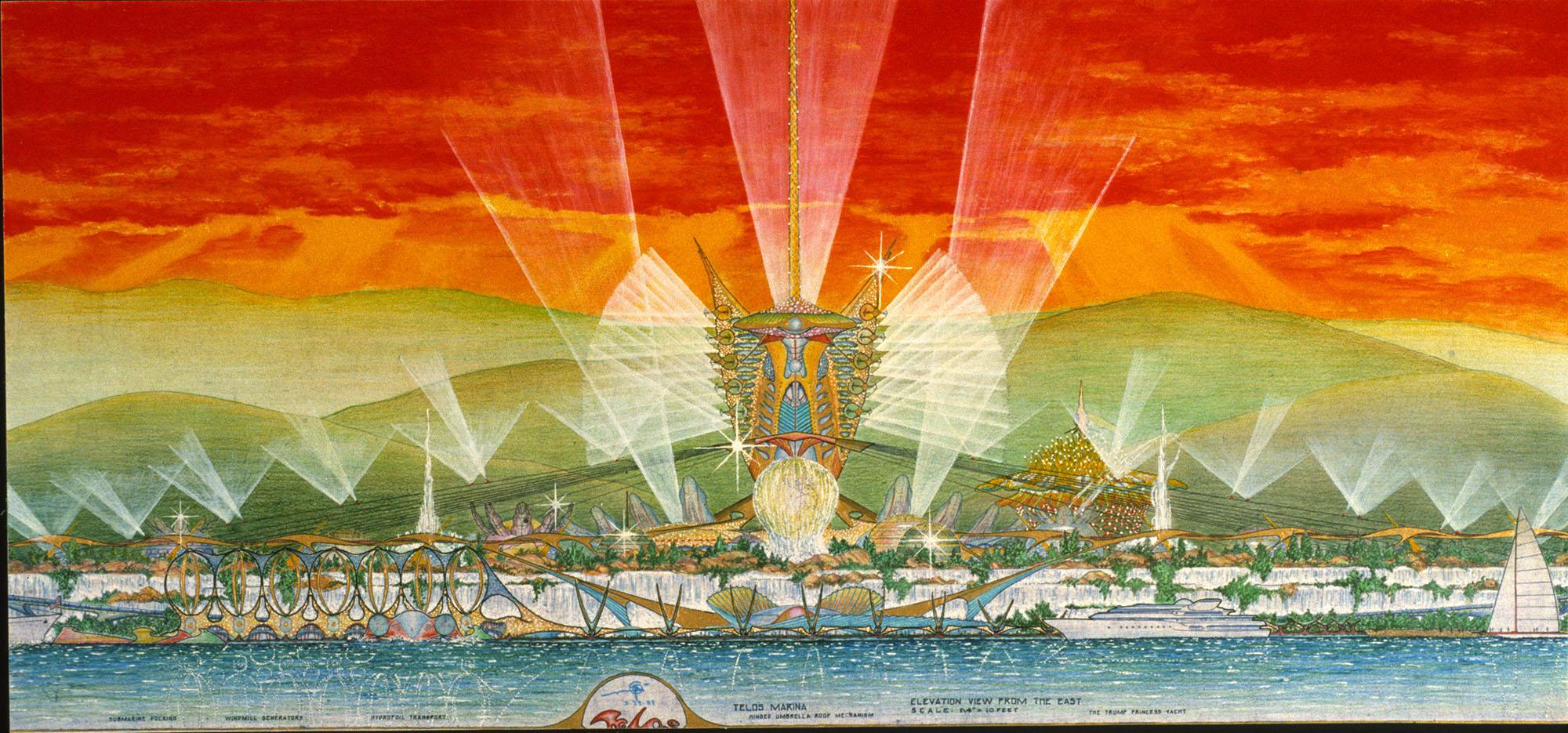
  Main building complex, Telos Interdisciplinary Nature, Technology, Education, Recreation Park, Brisbane, California, US, 1989
- The Tourist Village in Guizhou, China, is a $14 million project dedicated to assisting the indigenous people of the area, the Yao, in the cultivation and maintenance of their traditions and values. While offering a revolutionary type of lifestyle for its proposed 35,000 occupants, the ecologically conscious city would tether traditional views to their modern counterparts. By creating a new type of township in which successive generations would have no need to seek economic opportunities away from their home, a stabilizing effect on the society would ensue. The Yao, in a departure from modern technology, deliberately avoid using such things as motorcars and cellular telephones. The proposed city's architecture is not only reflective of their choices and practices but also incorporates the local folklore and art. Buildings (like schools and museums) would mimic spider webs in appearance and chimneys (resembling water buffalo horns) can ventilate and cool them naturally. Novel water collection systems via rooftops also contribute to the nature-inspired collective. In totality, the village functions without the use of motorized/mechanical or electrical power in order to maintain the respect of native ideology. The development is anticipated to draw visitors from around the globe, designating the area a cultural and economic zone by the Chinese government.
- The Two-mile High Ultima Tower is a structure of over 500 floors that would house one million people. Inspired by the termite nest in both form and function, this skyscrapers tensile structure has a "spine" with a hollow, mirrored center, to provide sunlight for plant growth. The entire building is suspended like a giant maypole and flexes under the stresses and strains of nature. Each of the twelve levels, open to the elements, affords its occupants a recreational ecosystem with forests, rivers, lakes, hillsides, and wildlife including birds. By incorporating photovoltaic cells and windmills into the design, energy is readily and organically created to sustain the needs of the inhabitants. Composting toilets and natural water-reclamation systems aid in maintaining a balanced ecology. Its price tag of $150 billion offers a "vertical solution" to the ongoing real-world issue of overpopulation.
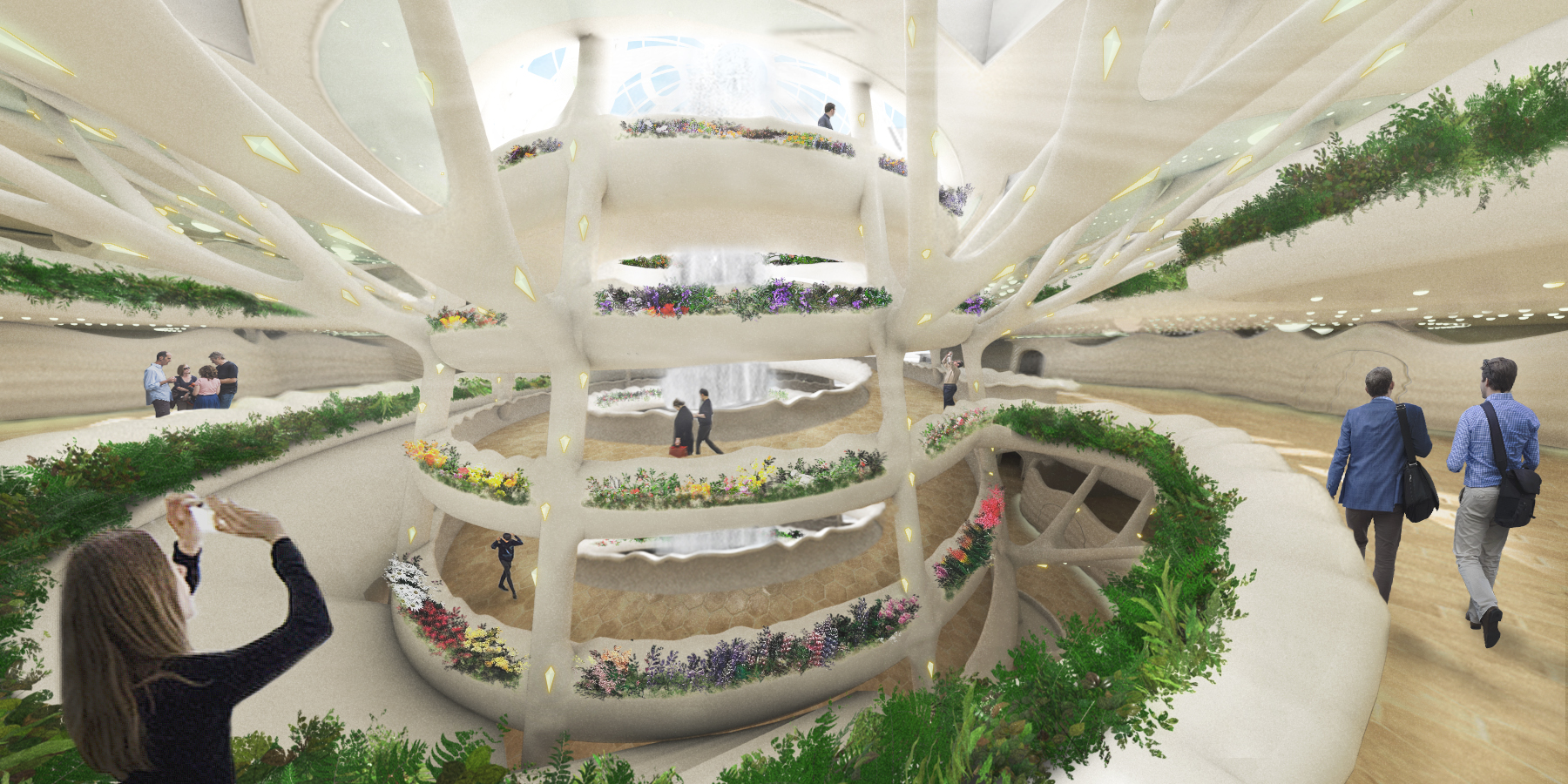
- Interior view of Spiral Gallery and Garden structure, Springhill Drive Commercial Building, Mount Shasta, California, US, 2019
  Tssui is proposing an underground commercial building for construction on Spring Hill Drive in Mount Shasta, California. The structure, composed of wood and GigaCrete and having no HVAC (heating, ventilation, and air conditioning) system, may be the world's first of its kind with a "true zero footprint." Electricity is human generated and backed-up by silent "Aerotecture" windmills to battery storage. A "Lifestraw" water catchment system and sawdust toilets are additional features of this structure that are meant to "do no harm" to the planet. A presentation of this structure was delivered at the Mount Shasta City Park Dance Hall in 2019.

== Teaching ==
Tssui has worked in professorial duties and as a lecturer at a number of schools and universities, including:

- UC Berkeley as a Senior Lecturer
- Harvard University as a research scholar
- Ohio University as a Thomas Ewing Visiting Professor
- North Carolina State University as the 2002–2003 Harrelson Lecturer
- Harbin University Xili Graduate Campus as a Special Foreign Professor of Architecture
- Peking University Graduate School of Environment and Energy in Shenzhen
- South China University of Technology in Guangzhou
- Instructor at the San Francisco Institute of Architecture

== Clothing, fine art, and furniture design ==
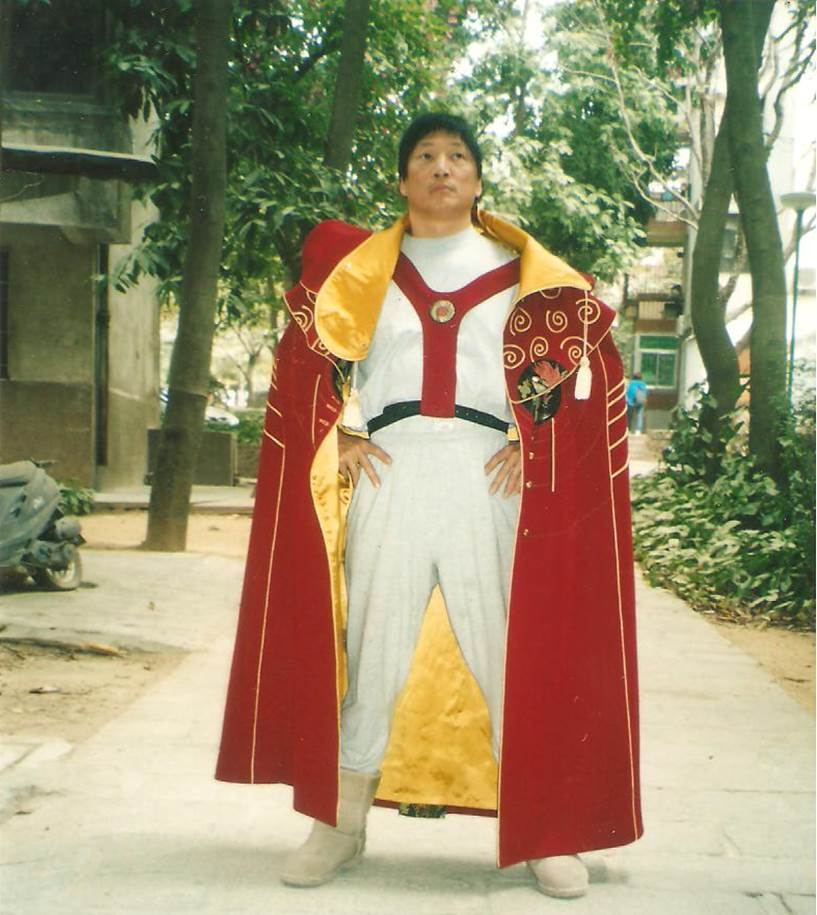
Cape Design using Tibetan red wool and gold silk piping, Shenzhen, China, 2000

Tssui's clothing designs include prototypes with sequin-like solar panels which would allow the wearer to charge and power their personal electronic devices. The designs have appeared in magazines such as Mondo 2000 and Hyphen. The 2008 Winter cover of the magazine Hors Ligne also features one of his garments.

His work is described as "moving architectural clothing" and reflects the biologic principles found in his architecture, in that his designs are meant to adapt to the wearer's physical activity as well as protect from the elements. Some of the stylistic influence of his architecture also bleeds over into his fashions, with ridges, spines, and wings all featuring in his designs.

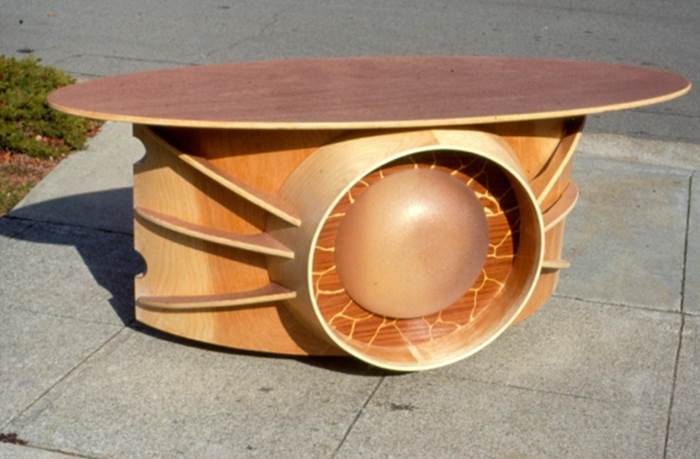
Rolling Kitchen Buffet Table, Oakland, California, US, 1993

In his furniture design, Tssui uses principals of maximum strength using the least amount of materials: similar principles which are found in his biologic style of architecture.

== Media appearances ==
Tssui was the subject of the film TELOS: The Fantastic World of Eugene Tssui, which premiered at the Architecture and Design Film Festival in Los Angeles on March 13, 2014. The film held screenings at various locations in the United States as well as abroad.

A new feature documentary is in production about Tssui's life story called "Man Beyond Time," directed by Laurent le Gall.

Additionally, Tssui has appeared on various television channels, including PBS, the Discovery Channel, CTV News Channel and Asian television channels CCTV and SinoVision. A number of short films have featured him and his work as a subject, including "Nature's Blueprints." Tssui has also contributed to a number of short films, including "S.A.C.E.Y./SAFE PLACE ALTERNATIVE" and "Time To Save the Wolves," for which he composed the piano music.

He has also been featured on radio and has interviewed with Jack Foley.

== Awards ==
Tssui has received scholarships and grants from the Graham Foundation and the National Endowment for the Arts.

== Bibliography ==
=== Books and periodicals ===
- Evolutionary Architecture: Nature As A Basis For Design (Wiley and Sons, 1999 ISBN 9780471117261) This book features a foreword by Louis L. Marines, who was president of the American Institute of Architects, and an introduction by Tssui's mentor, Bruce Goff.
- The Urgency of Change (China Building and Construction Press, 2002 ISBN 9787112051557)
- The Architecture of Eugene Tsui (ISSN 1000-8373)
- Learning from Nature Before it's too Late (ISSN 1000-8373)
- Nature Leads Us to the Future: Leave No Trace (ISSN 1000-8373)
- Beyond Green Building: Transformation of Design and Human Behavior (China Science Publishing and Media, Ltd. 2015 ISBN 9787030447241)
- Sustainable Development (World Architecture Review magazine, January, 2000) (ISSN 1000-8373)
- Improving the world through Biomimicry (Taylor Francis Online, October 2022)

=== Other ===
- Eugene Tsui, Architectural Drawings Print Portfolio (1990)
- Evolutionary Architecture: The Drawings and Plans of Eugene Tsui 1992 (Pomegranate Calendars and Books, 1992)
- Evolutionary Architecture: The Drawings and Plans of Eugene Tsui 1993 (Pomegranate Calendars and Books, 1993)
