= Josef Paul Kleihues =

German architect (1933–2004)

Josef Paul Kleihues (11 June 1933, Rheine – 13 August 2004, Berlin) was a German architect, most notable for his decades long contributions to the "critical reconstruction" of Berlin. His design approach has been described as "poetic rationalist".

== Early life and education ==
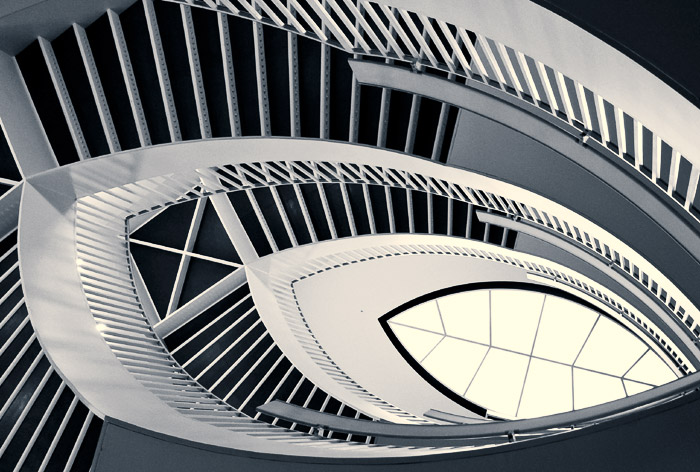
Stairwell at the Museum of Contemporary Art in Chicago

Born in 1933 in Rheine, he studied architecture at the University of Stuttgart (1955–57) and Technische Universität Berlin (1957–59).

== Career ==
After graduation, Kleihues spent one year at the École nationale supérieure des Beaux-Arts in Paris. After having worked in the architectural practice of Peter Poelzig in West Berlin, in 1962 he founded his own practice with Hans Heinrich Moldenschardt.

In 1971 Kleihues designed "Block 270", a residential building in Berlin-Wedding. This became an important work which re-established the Berlin block plan, a traditional typology, that stood in opposition to contemporary urban planning. As professor at the TU Dortmund University from 1973 and director of the International Building Exhibition Berlin (IBA) between 1979 and 1987, Kleihues propagated the concept of urban "critical reconstruction".

He was a visiting professor at Cornell University during fall 1975. From 1986 to 1991 he held the Irwin S. Chanin Distinguished International Professorship at The Cooper Union's School of Architecture. In 1989 his work was presented in Joseph Paul Kleihues: The Museum Projects, an exhibition and an accompanying catalog (Rizzoli, 1989) at The Cooper Union.

Kleihues received international recognition for several museum projects, including for the Sprengel Museum in Hanover (1972) and the Museum of Prehistory in Frankfurt (1980–86). He continued designing museums, including the Civic Gallery and Lütze Museum in Sindelfingen (1987–90), the Berlin Museum of Contemporary Art, an adaptive reuse of the Hamburger Bahnhof, a 19th-century railway station, and the Museum of Contemporary Art, Chicago. He also chaired the jury that awarded Daniel Libeskind the commission to build the Jewish Museum Berlin.
