= Christiane Erlemann =

German urban planner and feminist

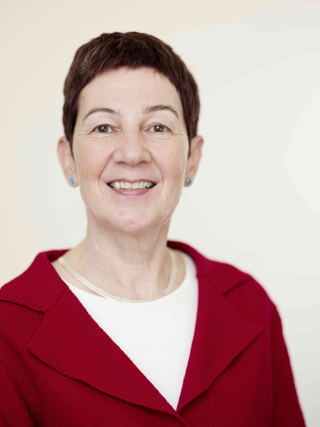
Image of Christiane Erlemann

Christiane Erlemann (born 1953) is a German urban planner and pioneer of the second wave of the women's movement. She was one of the founders of the Aachen Women's Centre and the Congress of Women in Science and Technology (FiNuT). She was involved in the Feminist Organisation of Women Planners and Architects (FOPA) and campaigns for equal opportunities for women engineers and scientists. She was born in Lünen.

== Biography ==
Christiane Erlemann is the daughter of a pharmacist (at that time a profession requiring a high school diploma) and a bank clerk who both ran a grocery shop. She attended a girls' grammar school and from 1971 studied architecture at Rheinisch-Westfälische Technische Hochschule (RWTH) architecture, specialising in urban planning.

From 1972, she became a member of a women's group that discussed gender relations and feminist theory at its meetings. At the same time, the group initiated public actions and demonstrations on women's political issues. The actions led to the founding of the Aachen Women's Centre in 1974.

With their experiences as individual women among many male students on science and technology courses and their desire to discuss the social consequences of technology, Christiane Erlemann and her colleagues were not well received by the active women in the centre.

In the early days, 1974/75, it didn't matter what one did or studied. It was about completely different things: about § 218, leaving the church, self-awareness groups, self-help and the concept of women's oppression in general. Gradually, however, what the individuals did professionally became more important. The social scientists offered their first women's seminar at the university, with overwhelming success. [...] We felt that our conditions were so different that the social scientists simply couldn't speak for us. But we weren't asked either. After all, we existed. There were few of us, but we had been there from the beginning and had helped to set up the women's centre. Of course, it wasn't possible for us to introduce feminist content into our subjects, i.e. mechanical engineering, physics and so on. In other words: first we were pushed into a minority status by the men in our studies, and now by the women in the Women's Centre.

— Christiane Erlemann

Christiane Erlemann, Margarete Pauls (mechanical engineering) and Titi Janson (physics), together with other women from the fields of chemistry, electrical engineering and civil engineering, initiated reports on their experiences as technical women in the Frauenzeitung (women's newspaper) in 1976, which was published by various women's centres from 1973 onwards. At the university, they founded the group Feminism and Ecology to critically analyse scientific and technical topics.

From the very beginning it was obvious to us that the women's movement and the ecology movement belong closely together; that many more women from the women's centres should take an interest in the nuclear power plant issue and everything connected with it: the energy problem and, furthermore, the question of the conditions of origin, meaning and aim of today's natural science and technology. Unfortunately, it turned out that we met with very little response at the women's centre, but all the more incomprehension. This gave us food for thought. We do not believe that our approach is wrong, because women's behaviour clearly expresses their inherited lack of interest in technical matters. Rather, we see the need to research the connections mentioned more thoroughly and present them more clearly.

— Group Feminism and Ecology (at the RTWH)

The group took part in the protest against the Brokdorf nuclear power plant. The publication of a paper written in this context expanded contacts with women throughout Germany at the time, including women working in the natural sciences and technology. Erlemann and Pauls then invited women in scientific and technical professions and study programmes to the first national meeting in Aachen. This resulted in the Congress of Women in Science and Technology (FiNuT), a regular, autonomously organised exchange in German-speaking countries.

Already during her studies, Erlemann focused on women's issues and worked on a study project on the housing and living situation of housewives in a suburb. She wrote her diploma thesis on the Frauenkulturzentrum Sarah in Stuttgart. She investigated the centre's function in creating an urban public sphere and also worked at the centre herself. She published critical articles on urban planning from a women's perspective. In the trade journal Arch+, she reported on the protests of women from the building professions against discriminatory structures and laws.

After moving to Berlin, Erlemann was involved in the founding of the Feminist Organisation of Women Planners and Architects (FOPA) in 1981. The reason for this was the preparation of the International Building Exhibition (IBA), in which female architects were insufficiently represented.

Erlemann campaigned for equal opportunities for female engineering students and female engineers and scientists at technical universities. In the project network "Equal Opportunities for Women", she was project manager at the Technische Fachhochschule Berlin (TFH) in the project Women-promoting aspects of study reform. Together with Elfriede Herzog, she introduced the gender/innovation programme at the TFH as a research assistant in 2001 with the gender/innovation professorship.

In her dissertation, published in 2002, "Ich trauer meinem Ingenieurdasein nicht mehr nach. Why women engineers change careers - a qualitative empirical study", Erlemann investigated the subtle factors that alienate women from technical subjects on the basis of female dropouts. She used biographically orientated narrative interviews to show the entanglements of professional experiences with the personal background and the resulting actions. The discussion of political consequences and the thematisation of gender to explore, explain and change structures in the technical and scientific field are particularly important to her.

From 2010, she coordinated the mentoring programme "Gender-Partnership" at the Gender and Technology Centre (GuTZ) of the Beuth University of Applied Sciences Berlin and from 2012 she led the project "MINTPORT - MINT-Mentoring-Netzwerk - Einstieg, Verbleib und Vernetzung von Ingenieurinnen" (MINTPORT - STEM Mentoring Network - Entry, Retention and Networking of Female Engineers) with two focal points: firstly, the establishment of a mentoring programme with tandems of female mentors in companies and female students from the participating universities, and secondly, the support of the participating companies by offering organisational development from a gender perspective.

The archive of the Stiftung Deutsches Technikmuseum Berlin holds a collection of documents under the name VV FiNuT, including those of Rosemarie Rübsamen, Helene Götschel and Christiane Erlemann.

The FrauenMediaTurm archive and documentation centre contains a Vorlass of documents on Erlemann's contribution to the women's movement under "Erlemann, Christiane P02-Erle".
