= Critical reconstruction =

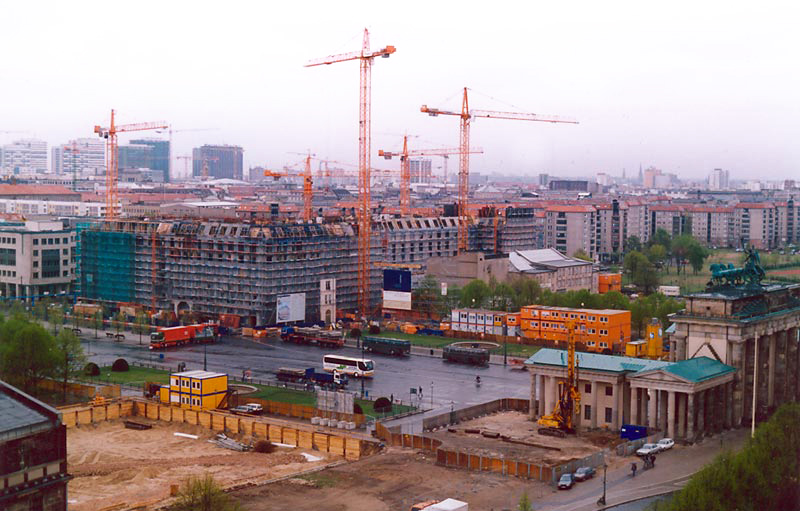
Hotel Adlon - construction of the new building at Pariser Platz, 1995

Critical Reconstruction is a theory of architecture and urbanism originally developed by the Berlin architect Josef Paul Kleihues. It was first applied at Berlin's International Building Exhibition in the 1980s, and was subsequently used in the reconstruction of the city after the fall of the Berlin Wall under Senate Building Director Hans Stimmann. Critical Reconstruction encouraged a return to traditional (pre-World War II) architectural styles and typologies, and sought to recreate the pedestrian-centered urban street life of the early twentieth-century European metropolis through the restoration of the inner city's original Baroque-era street plan.

Post-wall Critical Reconstruction in Berlin was closely associated with an architectural approach called "New Simplicity," theorized by Vittorio Magnago Lampugnani and championed by architect Hans Kollhoff.

Hans Stimmann also used Critical Reconstruction as the basis for his Planwerk Innenstadt, an inner-city development plan for Berlin that favored the demolition of mid-century buildings and the infill of empty plots with higher-density, mixed-use structures.

Major examples of Critical Reconstruction in Berlin include Potsdamer Platz, the Friedrichstadt Passagen, and Alexanderplatz.

== See also ==
- International Building Exhibition Berlin
