= Salerno Harbor station =

Maritime station in Salerno, Italy

Coordinates: 40.67453°N 14.752°E

The Salerno Harbor station is a maritime station located on the pier of the commercial port of the city of Salerno, and is directly linked with the newly built "Piazza della Libertà" (Freedom Square) and the city's waterfront.

In 2013 the Ministry of Cultural entered the maritime station in the selected group of high-quality architectural interventions.

== History ==
As of the end of the 1990s in Salerno felt the need to adopt a new structure that would accommodate the then modest flow of cruise passengers, to be placed in the dock Manfredi within the commercial port that, according to the Plan governor, was to be used for the tourism sector.

In 1999 it was announced by the City of Salerno an international ideas competition which was won by the firm Anglo-Iraqi architect Zaha Hadid. After the drafting of the executive project in March 2005 the work was contracted out to ATI Socome Cm Construction that after only two years relegated the contract not being able to complete the work. In December 2009, after a new tender, the construction site was entrusted to ATI Passarelli SpA - CO.MI Srl for an amount of around €8 million. After years of ups and downs and a hiccup processed jobs, partly because of the need to change the composition of ATI with the intervention of Slia Sas who was responsible for the creation casing glass and steel works, the terminal maritime was inaugurated on April 25, 2016, a few weeks after the death of Zaha Hadid. On this occasion, Stefano Boeri held a commemorative lecture at the Verdi theatre, with the participation of numerous personalities including Patrik Schumacher, Hadid study and director of the Pio Baldi, former president of the MAXXI. On 24 April President of the Council of Ministers Matteo Renzi visited the facility being unable to participate in the official inauguration the next day.

The inauguration, the first of a work of Zaha Hadid took place after her death, was celebrated by several newspapers of national and international newspapers including The New York Times and The Daily Telegraph.

== Architecture ==
The study defined the work as "an oyster with a hard outer shell that contains fluid and soft elements inside; a cover" hardened "that forms a protective shield from the intense sun of the Mediterranean". With its sinuous lines the terminal establishes the transition from land to sea, from the solid to the liquid both aesthetically and functionally, reinforcing the close relationship between the city and the sea front through an innovative design. From the first contact with this sculptural artificial element, passengers are subtly guided to the terminal length through three focal points: the ticket office, the restaurant and the waiting room which provide natural orientation points. The resort is spread over an area of 4,500 m^{2} on two levels divided into three blocks connected to each other: the administrative offices, the ferry terminal and the one for cruise ships. Of the station at night, with its lighting, it serves as the perfect beacon for ancient harbor. The large windows provide particularly beautiful on the Amalfi coast and the city of Salerno.

== Gallery ==
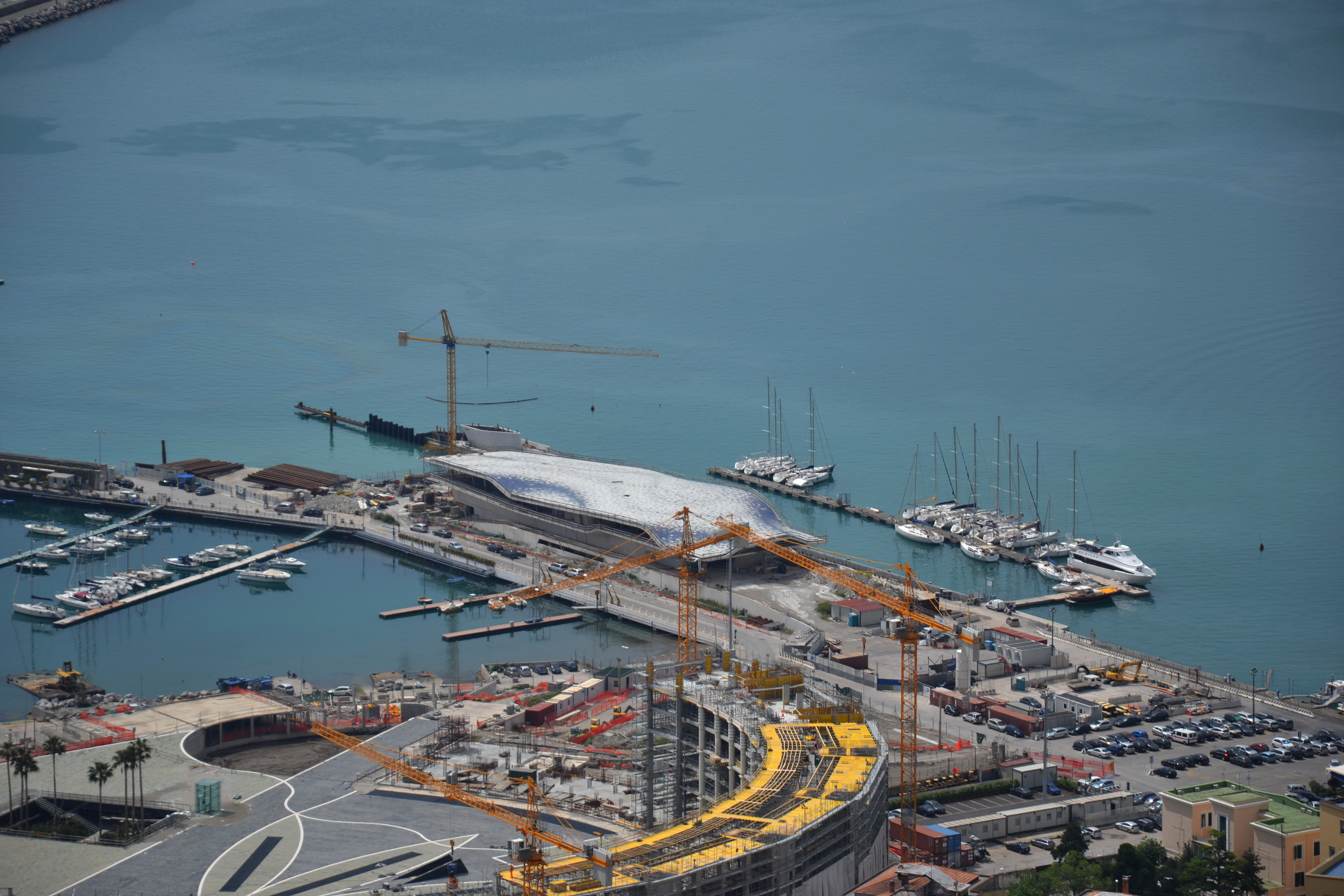
Marine Station, April 2013

== Traffic ==
The port authority expects to have two cruise ships of large dimensions simultaneously docked at the pier Manfredi for an annual total of n. 150 ships and about half a million cruise passengers. To date, the station is not yet operational and cruise ships you do not yet call, either because of unsuitable seabed is due to the lack of infrastructure within the complex.

== Services ==
The maritime station Salerno will have the important purpose to offer and coordinate a range of services related to cruise traffic, including:

- Porter service;
- information Office
- Taxi and car rental;
- shuttle service to the city center;
- small food court - bar;
- telephone services;
- pits for tourist and maritime travel agent;
- area checks by the Customs;
- finance and police;
- artistic events;

== See also ==
- Salerno
- Salerno railway station
