= Cardiff Bay Opera House =

Proposed opera house in Cardiff, Wales

Coordinates: 51°27′54.14″N 3°9′48.73″W

Zaha Hadid designed Cardiff Bay Opera House

Cardiff Bay Opera House was a proposed centre for the performing arts in Cardiff Bay, Cardiff, Wales, conceived in the 1990s as a crucial part of the Cardiff Bay redevelopment project. One aim of the scheme was to create a new home for the Welsh National Opera company, which was then based in the New Theatre in Cardiff. The Wales Millennium Centre was built in its place and it opened in 2004.

The plan, supported by the Cardiff Bay Development Corporation, was to construct a permanent home for Welsh National Opera on a site near the Inner Harbour, Cardiff Bay. An international design competition was held and was eventually won by the Iraqi-born architect Zaha Hadid. The Hadid design was called the Crystal Necklace by some in the media. However, the project failed to win financial support from the Millennium Commission, the body which distributed funds from the UK National Lottery.

== International design competition ==
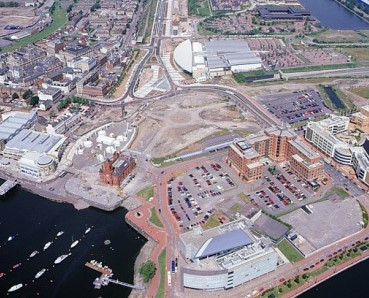
The site of the proposed Cardiff Bay Opera House in the open space in the middle of the image

An international design competition was established by the Cardiff Bay Opera House Trust to decide on the architect for the project. The competition would eventually be in two rounds. The first round of the competition attracted 268 international competitors; it was won by Iraq-born architect Zaha Hadid. The list of architectural practices that took part in the competition included Itsuko Hasegawa, Mario Botta, Rem Koolhaas, Rafael Moneo, Manfredi Nicoletti, Pietro Marcozzi Architect, Rusli Associates, Werner Seligmann & Associates, Percy Thomas Partnership and Greg Lynn FORM. Her avant-garde design was a glass structure that surrounded the main theatre. However, her design was deemed so radical that Lord Crickhowell, as chair of the Cardiff Bay Opera House Trust, asked Hadid to submit her design again along with Norman Foster + Partners and Manfredi Nicoletti, who were asked to submit revised designs, for a second round of competition. But she again won both this and a third round. She remained confident of eventual success: ‘Give them time and space to understand. The problem is that people in this country have seen so much garbage for so long they think life is a Tesco. When the highest aspiration is to make a supermarket, then you have a problem.’

== Aftermath ==
The project lacked support from either South Glamorgan County Council or Cardiff City Council and was savaged by the media as being "elitist" and ugly. The Millennium Commission, which gave funding to such projects from the UK National Lottery, refused to fund the project as it considered it to be financially risky. This was not helped by the successful application for funding for the Millennium Stadium, just a few miles away. Eventually, the project collapsed. The project was said to have been destroyed by lack of public support for the design and by Cardiff Council's support for the Millennium Stadium.

The decision to formally reject the bid for lottery money by the Millennium Commission was announced on 22 December 1995. Many claim that the bid failed because of the widespread unpopularity of the Millennium Commission support for the Royal Opera House in London, which was seen as elitist. Opera reported one of the tabloid headlines where The Sun claimed "The Sun stops £50m lotto handout to opera - Delight as toff scheme is KOd".

Virginia Bottomley, Secretary of State for National Heritage, announced in a news conference that the project was flawed by uncertainties in the building's financing and construction, which made it the project too risky. Lord Crickhowell interrupted that news conference to denounce the rejection. He said the decision was "...shocking and incomprehensible...If this had been a project in London, it would be getting backing...You can understand the annoyance of people in Wales that we can't get the kind of vitally important projects that London seems to be allowed."

The project was succeeded by the Wales Millennium Centre, which included a broader range of artistic offerings and was said to be more in keeping with Welsh culture, whilst retaining the opera element. The Centre opened in November 2004, on the site originally intended for the Opera House.

Years later Hadid said she thought the opposition to her design was possibly a result of racism and sexism against her. Her design was reused for the Guangzhou Opera House in China.
