= International Building Exhibition Berlin =

The International Building Exhibition Berlin (German: Internationale Bauausstellung Berlin) (IBA Berlin) was an urban renewal project in West Berlin, Germany. Initiated in 1979, it was completed in 1987, matching the 750th anniversary of the founding of Berlin. The IBA followed two distinct strategies: "careful urban renewal" and "critical reconstruction." With a budget of $1.2 billion, it was to house about 30,000 people in selected areas of West Berlin.

== History ==
IBA was divided into two programs, each responsible for about 6,000 apartments. In 1979 Josef Paul Kleihues was appointed director of the IBA Neubau section by the Berlin Senate; Hardt Waltherr Hämer was director of the less-publicised Altbau He organised the exhibition along two distinct themes: IBA Alt aimed to explore methods of "careful urban renewal" and IBA Neu for experimenting "critical reconstruction."

Kleihues invited many international architects from 10 countries – including Gottfried Böhm, Mario Botta, Peter Eisenman, Vittorio Gregotti, John Hejduk, Herman Hertzberger, Hans Hollein, Arata Isozaki, Léon Krier, Rob Krier, Charles Moore, Aldo Rossi and James Stirling – to build in the following areas: the Prager Platz in Wilmersdorf as well as the Tegel, southern Tiergarten and southern Friedrichstadt districts. Consequently, Time called the IBA "the most ambitious showcase of world architecture in this generation".

== Gallery ==
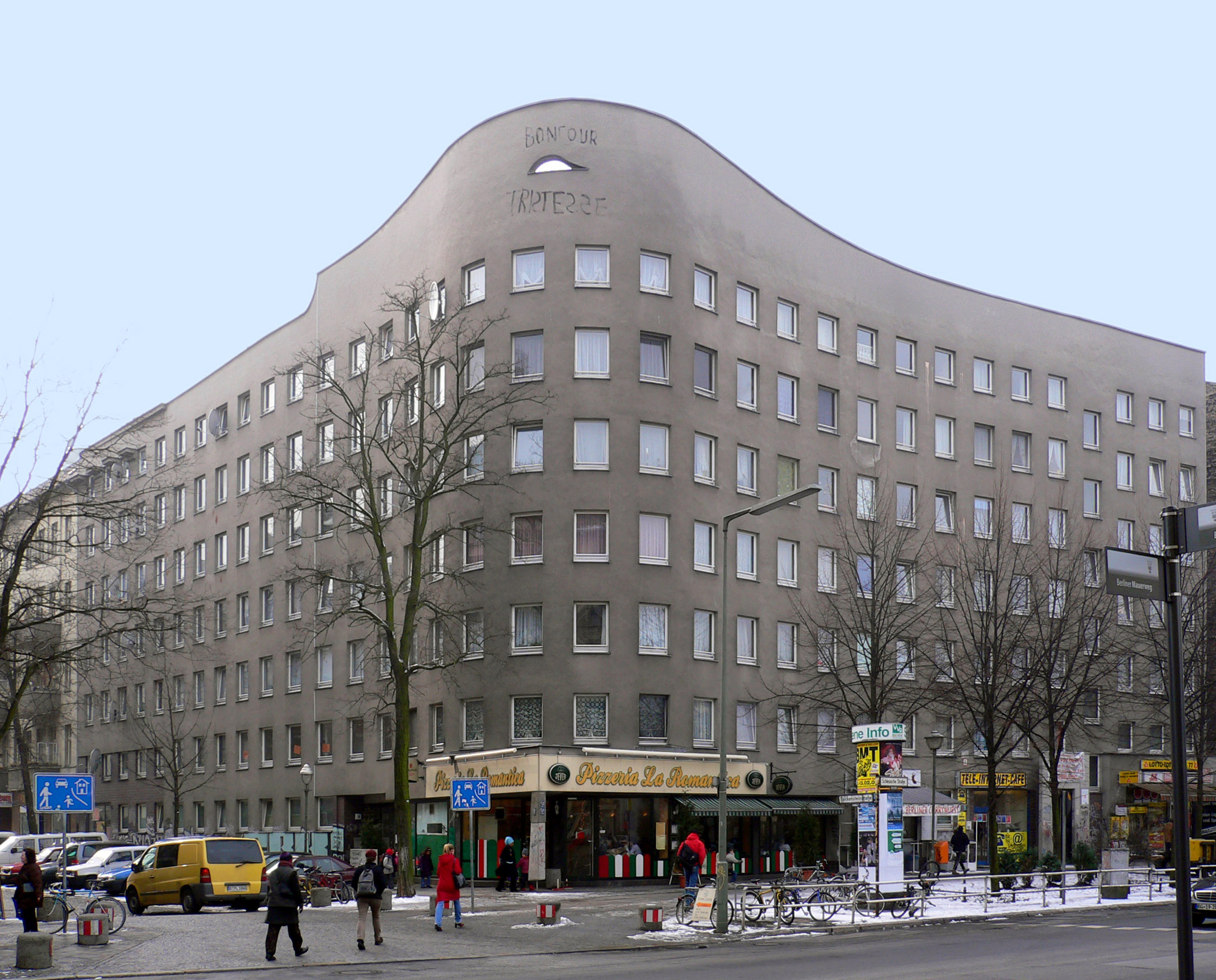
Bonjour tristesse apartment building by Alvaro Siza

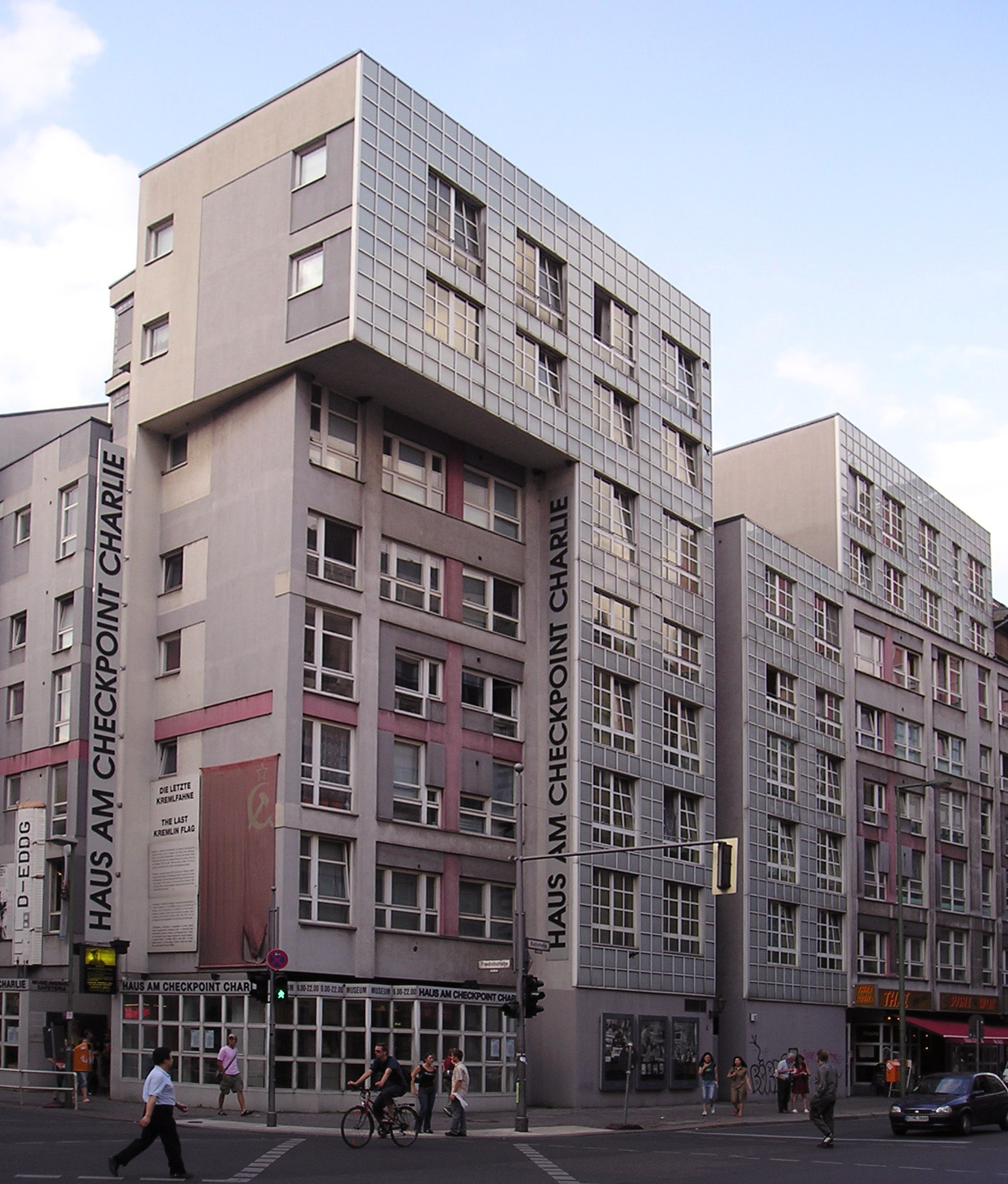
Haus am Checkpoint Charlie, by Peter Eisenman

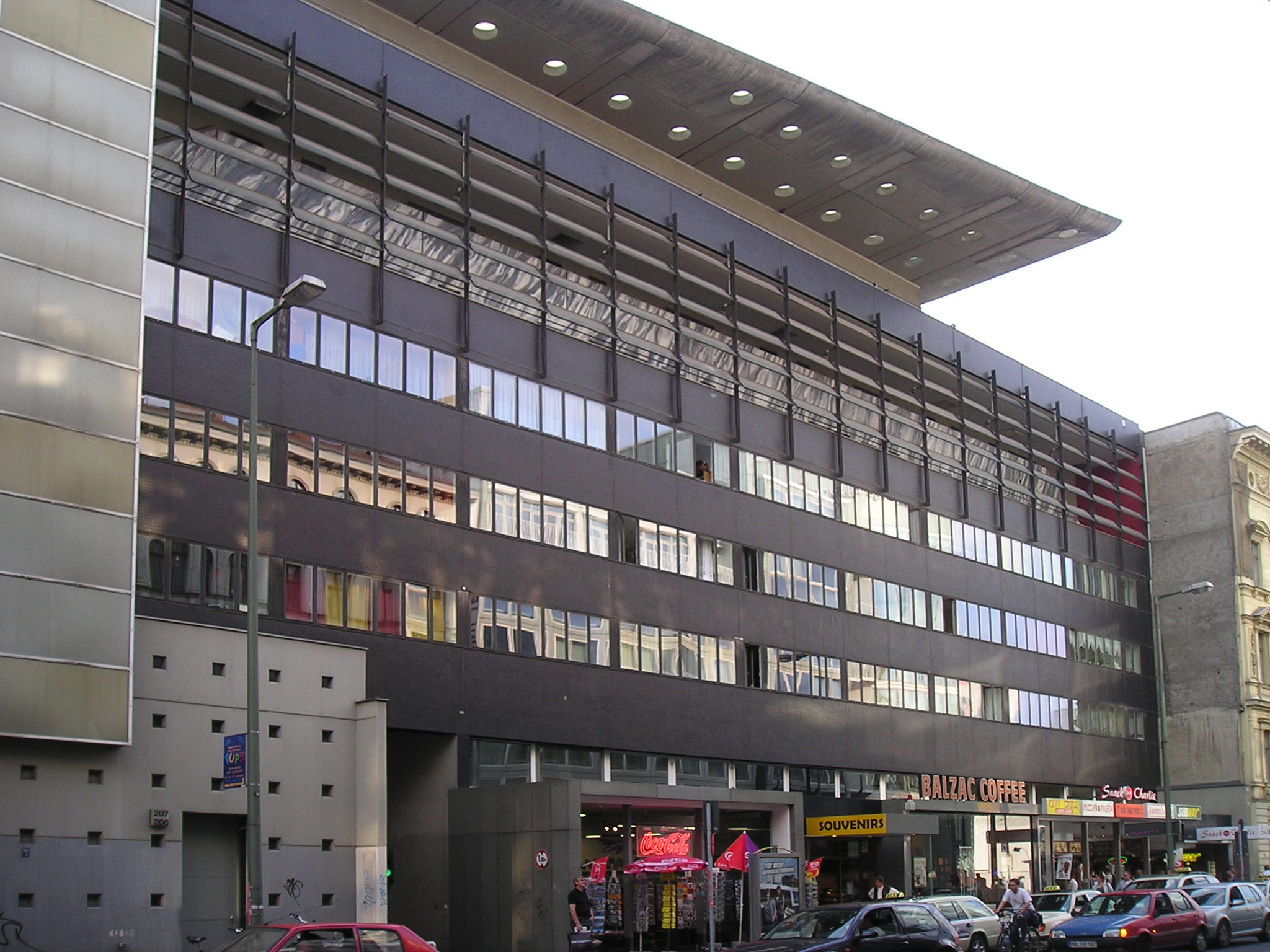
Haus am Checkpoint Charlie, by Rem Koolhaas

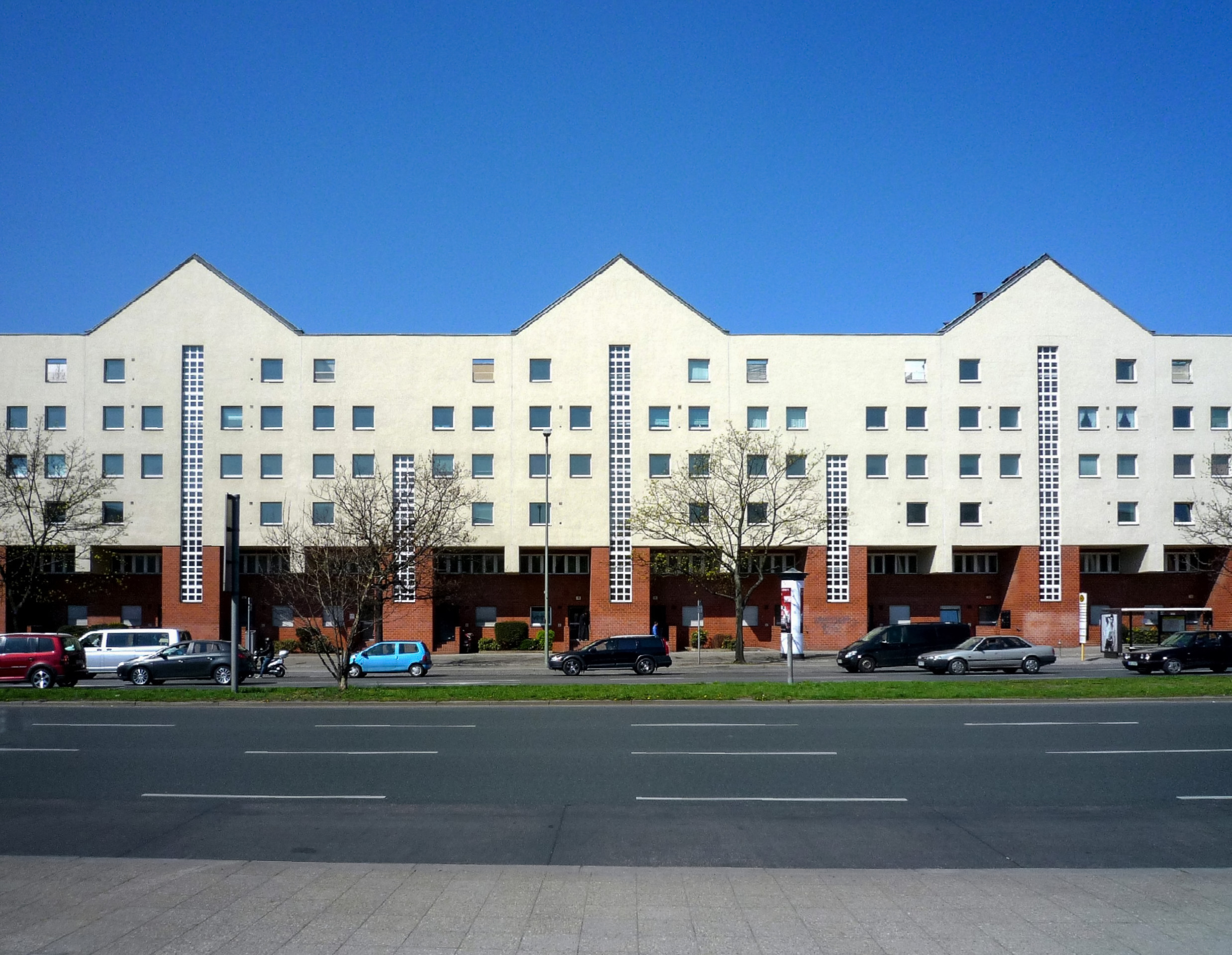
Apartments at Lützowplatz, by Oswald Mathias Ungers (demolished in 2013)

== See also ==
- Interbau – an International Building Exhibition organised in Berlin in 1957
