= Barcelona Development Agenda =

Response to Washington Consensus model

The Barcelona Development Agenda is a statement of development principles formulated as a response to the prevailing Washington Consensus development model. Resulting from the collaboration of economists from both developing and developed countries at the 2004 Universal Forum of Cultures in Barcelona, Spain, the Barcelona Development Agenda outlines seven lessons learned from previous policy failures and successes, and presents them as priorities for future economic reforms. The principles emphasize a balance of market and government economic roles, flexible economic tools, and an increased role for sustainability and equity in governance.

== Background ==
The 2004 Universal Forum of Cultures met in Barcelona, Spain from May 9 to September 26, 2004, to promote human rights, diversity, peace, and sustainable development. On the last two days of the Forum, economists from organizations around the world met to discuss the impacts of economic policies, especially global policies, on developing countries. The opening statement of the agenda laid out the discussion of the meeting:

We, a group of economists from developing and developed countries, met in Barcelona on September 24 and 25, 2004 to consider the prospects for growth and development around the world. We discussed the effect of economic reforms adopted by many developing nations over the last two decades, the lessons for economic policymaking that emerge from this experience, and the performance of the international economic system into which poor and middle-income countries are increasingly integrated.

— Barcelona Development Agenda

Based on trends and concerns the participants noted in international development policy, the agenda outlined principles for policy implementation that reflected both widely accepted principles of macroeconomics, such as the importance of market development, and improved understanding of challenges and solutions in developing markets, such as capital inequity and environmental impacts.

== Agenda's observations regarding current policy ==
=== Three encouraging trends ===
- Gains in human rights in many developing countries: Though there are still examples of rights violations in many places around the globe, there is a general and increasing trend of recognition and implementation of human rights and democratic principles worldwide. Additionally, though human rights records are not always indicative of the strength of an economy, development and human rights causes are often similar.
- Rapid growth in several countries that has pulled millions of people out of poverty: Development policies already in place have managed to increase the income of millions of people in some of the most highly populated developing countries on the planet, including China and India. While successful development paths are highly variable depending on the particular circumstances of each country, the right combination of policies and resources has the capacity to affect rapid change.
- Recognition of the importance of macroeconomic stability: Though some economic adjustment policies have failed to produce stabilized economies, the consensus is now that macroeconomic stability (e.g., reduced inflation) is necessary for successful implementation of other development policies, as well as accelerating growth.

=== Three reasons for concern ===
- Recurring systemic financial crises affecting developing states: The application of Washington Consensus-style free markets and financial arrangements has not been beneficial for all developing states that have adopted them. The economies and financial systems of several countries that adopted them, particularly in Latin America, stagnated or suffered declines. It was presumed until this point that western-style policies were applicable across a broad spectrum of political situations, but assumptions made by these policies, especially in reference to markets and information flow, were flawed.
- Lack of sustained growth in many regions that adopted reforms: In addition to financial difficulties experienced by some developing countries after adopting some economic reforms, other economies experienced growth which subsequently stagnated.
- Persistence and growth of distributional inequalities in many developing states: When growth has occurred in developing countries, it is often disproportionately benefits wealthier households which makes equitable development more difficult. Not only does inequality reduce savings rates, promote inefficiency, and consolidate power, but it has the potential to destabilize social systems.

== Seven Lessons and Priorities for Reform Proposed by the Agenda ==
1. Institutional quality and market orientation matter: For successful development to occur, institutions such as property rights and the rule of law must be established and improved, though the exact form of these is heavily dependent on historical and cultural context. Additionally, markets should be balanced by state regulation, as assumptions involving a pure market economy are rarely met in developing countries. Lastly, though the mechanics are not provided for, equitable distribution of income is stated as an additional basis of successful development strategies.
2. Poor financial policies are barriers to development: Weak and maladjusted fiscal policy tends to inhibit development, and disproportionally affects low-income households upon failure. Large public debt can burden governments with debt service obligations that consume a significant proportion of the GDP. Large amounts of private debt can inhibit innovation and expansion in private sector industry. Poorly regulated financial institutions, such as some banks, and loose monetary policies, such as expanded money supply and credit are serious barriers to development.
3. Sustained growth cannot be guaranteed by a single set of policies: Development solutions that can trigger sustained growth will vary depending on the historical, cultural, and social attributes of a particular country. The primary impact of this is that states should have the flexibility to experiment with different economic policies that suit their specific context. Experimentation with different bundles of industrialization, technology development and acquisition, import/export, and other policies should be encouraged. Constraints to growth should be identified and addressed through both macro and microeconomic policies.
4. Multilateral trade negotiations should proceed in a manner that promotes development: Whereas protectionism in developed countries creates obstacles for market entry and expansion in developing countries, trade negotiations should include stakeholders from impacted states. Additionally, trade policies in developing countries should be examined to identify and correct those that limit growth. (Note: at the time of the BDA, it was hoped that the Doha Round would reduce trade barriers between and among developed and developing countries. Though currently stalled, there have been recent calls to restart negotiations.)
5. Current international financial relationships are faulty: Financial arrangements between developed and developing countries are often defective, insufficient, and detrimental to the recipients. This is largely due to missing or malfunctioning markets within the countries, and a lack of mechanisms to share risk between lenders and recipients. As such, financial capital flows tend to be volatile, and are underregulated by international lending institutions. Additionally, aid levels tend to be inadequate to address some financial problems in developing markets. Both unbalanced risk and shortage of aid are likely the result of lack of representation of recipient countries in decision-making processes regarding financial arrangements.
6. Labor and financial capital are not treated equally: Movement of different types of capital across international boundaries is not balanced. Current policies, especially in developed nations, favor the transfer of financial capital, but often discourage the movement of labor capital across borders. Increased migration of workers along with sufficient protection (e.g. workers rights, market integration) of labor has the potential to increase both equity and efficiency in production and service provision. Improved labor capital mobility can also increase financial capital exchange through remittances.
7. National and global sustainable development policies are necessary to address growing environmental problems: Whereas previous models on development ignored, misunderstood, or underestimated the environmental impact of growth policy, updated models must internalize and address the environmental impacts of development. As impacts including soil degradation, climate change, and reduced water quality and availability disproportionately impact developing countries and low-income families, sustainable development policies must address these impacts, whether through prevention or alleviation. However, economic policies in developed countries must also address domestic environmental impacts, some of which are exported to developing economies.

== Application ==
Though no initiatives have been directly undertaken as a result of the Barcelona Development Agenda, the Center for International Relations and Development Studies (CIDOB, Centre d’Investigació de Relacions Internacionals i Desenvolupament) has been working to implement some of the BDA principles into the Ibero-American Development Agenda (ADI, Agenda de Desarrollo Iberoamericana). The ADI has a goal of

facilitating policy recommendations that permit countries to attain sustainable economic growth as a way of reducing poverty and inequality, thus augmenting the quality of life of the Latin American people. In order to do this, the ADI Seminar promotes discussion and dialogue between prominent economists, sociologists and political scientists based on the rigorous analysis of the economic, social and institutional situation in the region.

— Centro de Estudios y Documentación Internacionales de Barcelona

A collaboration between Latin American governments, economics, sociologists, and political scientists, principles stated in the BDA are being implemented through collaborative policy decision-making in the ADI.

== Participants ==
- Alice Amsden, Massachusetts Institute of Technology
- Olivier Blachard, Massachusetts Institute of Technology
- Ramón Caminal, Consejo Superior de Investigaciones Científicas
- Guillermo Calvo, Columbia University
- Daniel Cohen, Paris School of Economics, Paris
- Antón Costas, Consejo Superior de Investigaciones Científicas
- Guillermo de la Dehesa, Centre for Economic Policy Research
- Jeffrey Frankel, Harvard Kennedy School, Harvard University
- Jordi Galí, Centre for Research in International Economics, University Pompeu Fabra
- Ricardo Hausmann, Harvard University
- Louka Katseli, Development Center, Organisation for Economic Co-operation and Development
- Martin Khor, Third World Network
- Paul Krugman, Princeton University
- Deepak Nayyar, Jawaharlal Nehru University
- José Antonio Ocampo, Initiative for Policy Dialogue, Columbia University
- Dani Rodrik, Harvard Kennedy School, Harvard University
- Jeffrey D. Sachs, Earth Institute, Columbia University
- Miguel Sebastián, Complutense University of Madrid
- Narcís Serra, Center for International Relations and Development Studies
- Shari Spiegel, New Holland Capital
- Joseph E. Stiglitz, Initiative for Policy Dialogue, Columbia University
- Ernesto Talvi, Coalition for Environmentally Responsible Economies
- Joan Tugores, University of Barcelona
- Andrés Velaso, Harvard Kennedy School, Harvard University
- Jaume Ventura, Centre for Research in International Economics, University Pompeu Fabra
- Xavier Vives, Institut Européen d'Administration des Affaires
- John Williamson, Peterson Institute for International Economics
