= City Mine(d) =

Belgian urban design and social activist organisation

City Mine(d) is a non-profit organisation based in Brussels, Belgium, focused on urban design and social activism. It seeks to involve citizens in the development of public spaces, and has offshoots in several other cities around the world. Its aim is "to make urban design everyone's business".

== History ==
From 1995, a group of community activists, artists, architects, academics, and others collaborated on a series of actions in derelict buildings in Brussels, based on urban interventions. In 1997, the group incorporated themselves as a non-profit association, called City Mine(d).

One of its early projects was at the open-air Cinema Nova in Brussels in 1998, where it helped to establish "PleinOPENair". This became more than a free outdoor screening, and developed into a mobile summer festival with programmes that highlighted a series of urban and social issues, including housing difficulties and abandoned buildings. It encouraged citizens to interact with and reflect on their city. For eight years, PleinOPENair focused on many local neighbourhoods and open spaces undergoing transition, and other organisations became involved. During summer 2004, the project established its home in the complex of administrative buildings of the Belgian Government in northern Brussels, which had been vacated. In addition, City Mine(d) became a node in the network Bunker Souple, a loose-knit connection of artists, activists and architects that wanted to develop their work and the city outside the narrow remit of institutionalised cultural production.

In 1999 the now defunct Precare project (ceased in 2009) was set up to facilitate the temporary use of urban derelict buildings. By temporary using empty spaces, artists and creators could start their career at very low cost, while previously abandoned buildings became used again. Notable projects Precare was involved in are Cinema Nova and Bains Connective.

When, in 2000, Brussels was one of Europe's Capitals of Culture, City Mine(d) worked to have "informal culture" involved in its programme. With two large scale interventions - Limite Limite and Bara-ke - and a series of networking initiatives - like Bunker Souple Repertorium- it tried to give the passing glory of a cultural capital a more lasting impact. Limite Limite went on to win the prestigious "Thuis in de Stad Award" for innovative urban renewal from the regional government, while Benjamin Verdonck won wide acclaim with Bara-ke. Also in 2000, City Mine(d)'s work featured in the major millennium exhibition Mutations in Bordeaux' Arc en Rêve Centre d'Architecture, commissioned by Stefano Boeri and as part of the Uncertain States of Europe network. During the EU Summit of 2001, City Mine(d) was heavily involved in the occupation of the Luxemburg station in Brussels. Bruxxel free zone provided an alternative for creativity and debate amidst the increasing antagonising between politicians and anti-global campaigners.

Between 1997 and 2010, City Mine(d) organised around 60 projects in Brussels, including PaleisVanSchoor (transforming an empty plot into a park) and PleinOPENair, LimiteLimite (a new tower and meeting place in a derelict neighbourhood), Barake (an artists' residence), and MAPRAC (a project discussing the use of old government buildings). City Mine(d) first engaged mostly with local and regional government in Brussels, but from around 2001 broadened its focus as it realised the power of increasing "glocalisation" which came with gentrification of the inner cities.

From 2003 onwards City Mine(d) widened its horizons by setting up offices in Barcelona, Spain, and London, England. After publishing their own road maps to the city - The Networkbook for urban p/arts in London and Tallermapas in Barcelona - local initiatives further developed in all three cities. The Bruxel glocal conference in Brussels' Bozar in February 2003, with contributions by Josep Acebillo, Patsy Healey and others was an attempt to bring artists, activists and researchers from Europe together to think and talk about bottom-up initiatives in a globalising context.

In November 2010 City Mine(d) organised a three-day event of activities and workshops called the Urban Platform, which took place from 19 to 21 November 2010 in Brussels. Its aim was the exchange of experience and information among 30 different projects, 13 of which were European. The three days comprised a public debate in the Flagey Building, then closed workshops hosted by locals in their homes, and on the Sunday, a "bazaar of initiatives, proposals, plans, opinions, and activities".

== Description ==
City Mine(d) is a design practice that has changed its focus over the years, and does not promote a brand image. It has been described as "production house for art interventions in public space", through "economic development agency", to "neighbourhood activists in some twenty neighbourhoods throughout Europe" (City Mine(d), 2016). Overall, it aims to bring sometimes adversarial parties together to achieve a good outcome for the city and to improve the lives of people. City Mine(d) has created networks around the world that allow direct communication and encourage creative production.

== Impact and recognition ==
City Mine(d) has earned a reputation for its social innovation and positive effect on urban governance and development. It has delivered more than 100 projects in many European cities. Its approach was praised by the Flemish Government in 2011 and 2014, and was recognised by the European Commission for good practice in 2012. It has been cited in academic journals, architecture magazines, and other media, and its projects mentioned in many books.

In 2002 it won the Flemish Government's Thuis in de Stad award for urban renewal, and in 2003 was nominated for the Sikkens Award.

== Prototypes and projects ==
City Mine(d) has focused on the creation of prototypes. The prototype aims to provide a tangible and practical answer to a topical social question. The development of prototypes follows a seven-step procedure that aims to ensure the result is delivered at the end, and to guarantee the involvement of a diverse group of partners.

Topical questions deal with urban sustainability issues. In the past, questions dealt with revolved around water in the city [ProperWater 2011-2014], the labour market [Micronomics 2007-2010], and bottom-up regeneration plans [can ricart 2004-2006]

=== City Mine(d) LAB ===
In an attempt to link experienced and scientific knowledge, to mobilise the knowledge built in the streets and allow this grassroots knowledge to be unlocked in universities, and conversely allow the knowledge universities develop to seep through to activism and grass roots activities, City Mine(d) set up City Mine(d) LAB, an interface between academia and activism/the field/grassroots initiatives. Tangible outcomes are collaborations in EU research on social innovation - Singocom (2001-2004) - social exclusion - Katarsis (2006-2009). - Social Cohesion - Social Polis (2008-2010), and on Co-creation in the Co-creation network (2017-2021).

=== Other projects ===
In 2021 City Mine(d) ran a project known as La Pile, to implement new practices of sharing electricity among residents of certain neighbourhoods in several Brussels neighbourhoods. The citizens would organise as a group to create and distribute electricity from renewable sources, and challenge the current model whereby the consumers have no say.

In the Kings Cross area of London, Elephant Path tried to find out if residents' interest in food, their skills and their talents could become a way of topping up their income. The project organised a "self managed collaborative kitchen/ canteen in Kings Cross" known as the Elephant Kitchen.
