= CIDOB =

CIDOB may refer to:

- Barcelona Centre for International Affairs (originally and in Catalan: Centre d’Informació i Documentació Internacionals a Barcelona), a think-tank on international affairs based in Barcelona, Spain
- Confederation of Indigenous Peoples of Bolivia (formerly Spanish: Confederación de Pueblos Indígenas del Oriente Boliviano), a Bolivian organization of indigenous people.
