= Josep Acebillo =

Spanish architect

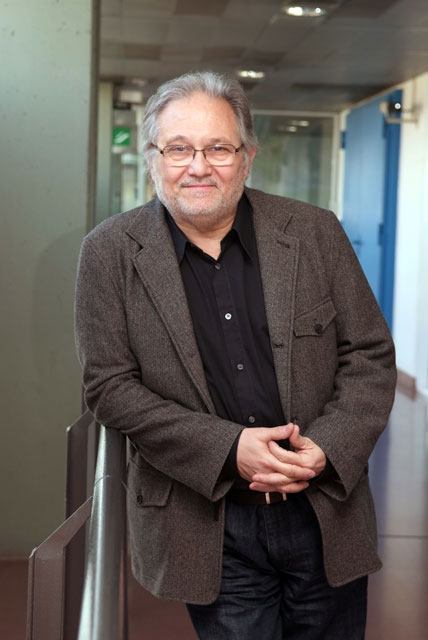
- Born: 1946 (age 79–80); Huesca, Aragon, Spain
- Education: Polytechnic University of Catalonia
- Occupation: Architect
- Awards: Honorific Medal of the City of Barcelona (1999); RIBA Gold Medal (1999)
- Practice: ASoffice - Architectural Systems Office
- Projects: 1992 Summer Olympics; 2004 Universal Forum of Cultures; 22@

Josep Acebillo (born in Huesca, Aragon, Spain, in 1946) is a Spanish architect and is currently a research professor at the University Pompeu Fabra in Barcelona. He obtained his Architecture degree from the Polytechnic University of Catalonia (ETSAB-1974).

== Biography ==
From 1974 to 1979, Acebillo worked independently or in collaboration with the MBM studio (Martorell, Bohigas and MacKay). During this period he was awarded the following awards: First prize of the National Competition of School Prototypes in Spain (1979), First prize for the redaction of the Master Plan of the Vall de Bohí in Lleida-Spain (1980), First prize for the redaction of the Master Plan for the Towns of Sitges and St. Pere de Ribes-Barcelona (1980) and the Second National Price of Urbanism in Spain (1982).

From 1981 to 1987, Acebillo was the director of Urban Projects Barcelona City Council, his tasks involved the design and construction of 140 urban spaces, infrastructures, monuments and facilities buildings promoted by the Municipality. The Public Urban Spaces of Barcelona constructed during this period were awarded for the quality with the Prince of Wales Prize in Urban Design of the Harvard Graduate School of Design (1990).

From 1988 to 1994, Acebillo was the director of IMPUSA, Institute for Urban Development (Olympic Holding) of the city of Barcelona, in charge of leading the projects and building the main infrastructures for the 1992 Summer Olympics. He was the recipient of the Honorific Medal of the City of Barcelona in 1992 for his contribution to the urban transformation.

From 1993 to 2011, Acebillo was the CEO (chief executive officer) of the Metropolitan Agency Barcelona Regional, a "think tank" spearheaded for the development of strategic urban projects and infrastructures in the city. His efforts were awarded with the Special European Price of Urbanism 1997/1998 of the European Commission for the project Infrastructure and General Metropolitan Systems.

Later in 1998, Acebillo was appointed "Commissioner of Infrastructures and Urban Planning" of Barcelona.

In 1999, Acebillo became the Chief Architect of the city of Barcelona. During the same year he was named an honorific member of the Royal Institute of British Architects (RIBA). In 1999, Barcelona was also the recipient of the RIBA awards with the Royal Gold Medal for Architecture due to the contribution of: Narcís Serra, Pasqual Maragall, Joan Clos, Josep Acebillo and Oriol Bohigas.

From 2003 to 2006, Acebillo was the coordinator of the Barcelona Urban Strategy Advisory Council which was composed of Richard Rogers, Dominique Perrault, Oriol Bohigas, Ramon Folch, Antoni Marí, Manuel de Solà-Morales and Joan Trullén, to advise the municipality on global strategies.

From 2007 until 2016, Acebillo founded and operated Architectural Systems Office, a consulting firm based in Switzerland and specialized in urban development in collaboration with Architect Stanislava Boskovic Sigon. During these years, the practice has won numerous international competitions such as the 1st Prize for the Urban Transformation in Bar, Montenegro (2008). Further relevant projects include the Strategic Project of Kazan, the Masterplan for the Universiada Kazan 2013, a Mix-Use development Tower complex in Kazan, the Strategic Urban Project in Ekaterinburg or the Riverfront redevelopment in Cheboksary.

Under the urban leadership of Acebillo, Barcelona has received worldwide recognition for the positioning of the city in the international architecture field. Following this recognition, Josep Acebillo was frequently called on to assess other cities such as London, Ostend, Kazan, etc. and guide their urban transformation endeavours. In 2003, in the case of London, Acebillo was appointed a member of the International Design Committee (London Development Agency) to assess the city development.

In his current capacity Josep Acebillo is research professor at the Pompeu Fabra University of Barcelona and acts as Senior Advisor for several governments including the Strategic Project for the Socio-Economic development of the Vesuvian Plateau in Italy.

== Academic experience ==
- Professor at the ETSAB (Technical Superior Architecture School of Barcelona) (1975–2001).
- Professor at the International Architecture and Urban Design Laboratory, Urbino, Italy, (1976–1977). Venice, (1997).
- Director of the postgraduate course The architecture on al large scale, Polytechnic University of Catalonia, (1992–93).
- Director of the postgraduate course Architecture in complex scales, Pompeu Fabra University of Barcelona, (1994).
- Professor of the postgraduate course Projecting the city: Infrastructures and complexity, Polytechnic University of Catalonia, (1995-96/1996-97).
- Professor of the Master course in urban planning Metropolitan complexity, Polytechnic University of Catalonia, (1995-96/1996-97).
- Visiting Professor during the Fall Semester 1997, at the School of Architecture of the Yale University.
- Full Professor Accademia di Architettura di Mendrisio, (University of Lugano) (2001 - 2016).
- Visiting Professor during the Fall Semester 2002, at Harvard Graduate School of Design of the Harvard University.
- Dean of the Architecture Academy, Università della Svizzera Italiana in Mendrisio (2003 – 2007).
- Director of the Institute for the Contemporary Urban Project of the Accademia di Architettura di Mendrisio, (University of Lugano) (2004 - 2016).
- Director of the research project Urban Systems & Urban Models, a Swiss cooperation project of architecture (Accademia di Architettura di Mendrisio, ETH Studio Basel, Choros SAR/EPFL École Polytechnique Fédérale de Lausanne)
- Member of the board of directors and professor of the Barcelona Institute of Architecture.
- Visiting Professor Kazan State University in 2014
- Visiting Research Professor Tongji University during 2017–2019.
- Visiting Research Professor Pompeu Fabra University of Barcelona from 2019 until today.

== Awards ==
- 1996 First prize at the competition for the extension of the Pompeu Fabra University of Barcelona.
- 1999 Royal Gold Medal for Architecture awarded by the Royal Institute of British Architects (RIBA) to the city of Barcelona and to the people who have contributed in the transformation of the city since the first democratic government of Barcelona (Narcís Serra, Pasqual Maragall, Joan Clos, Josep Acebillo and Oriol Bohigas.
- 1999 Honorary Member of the Royal Institute of British Architects (RIBA).
- 2000 First prize ex-aequo at the competition for the remodelling of Faliron Bay at Athens, Greece.
- 2001 Barcelona Energy Improving Plan Barcelona Renovable 2004 Award. Awarded by the Renewable Energy Partnership. (Brussels, December 2001)
- 2002 Special prize of the Venice Biennale in the Eight International Architecture Exhibition, for his leadership in international architecture.
- 2002 Jury Mention. II European Public Space Prize for the Environmental Recovery Project of the Final Stretch of the Besós River Channel. Awarded for the Institut français d'architecture, The Architecture Foundation of London, Netherlands Architecture Institute, Architekturzentrum Wien and the Centre de Cultura Contemporània de Barcelona.
- 2005 First prize in Public space, thematic square and urban development of the riverfront of the area of Zaragoza for International Expo 2008.
- 2007 Energy Award for the 2004 Universal Forum of Cultures in Barcelona.
