= Mona Kim =

South Korean-born American designer

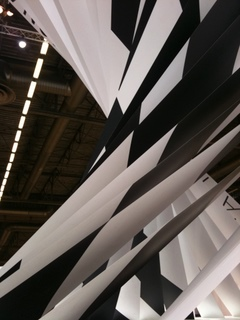
- Scenography created by Mona Kim for the world's largest fashion fabric show Premiere Vision. Paris, 14–16 sep 2010.
- Education: Carnegie Mellon University
- Known for: multidisciplinary design consulting and a visual art

Mona Kim is an American designer born in South Korea and educated in the United States. Kim is a multidisciplinary design consultant and a visual artist for cultural and commercial projects (Mona Kim Projects).

== Life and career ==
Kim is a Carnegie Mellon University graduate with BFA degree with Honors in Design. She had been selected by IBM Strategic Design branch during her last year in the university to collaborate with leaders in the design field such as Edward Tufte and Sam Lucente. In 1990, Kim moved to Italy which had significantly influenced her work and life philosophy to date. In Milan, she had worked with the late Ettore Sottsass and had been introduced to the instinctual approach to design.

In 1993, Kim moved to New York City where she had begun to expand her work into the fashion & beauty sector, working on advertising campaigns for fashion, beauty, and technology for clients and agencies such as Bloomingdales, Samsung Electronics, Coty, Kenneth Cole, and Arnell Group, as well as working overseas for fashion houses in Italy such as Mandarina Duck and Trussardi on the collection side.

During this time, Kim also started to design environments and "experiential spaces" for thematic museums and exhibitions. Using her influence from fashion and advertising background, and merging it with an intellectual approach to communicating socio-political information. Several of her projects have received awards, which integrate images, space, and message, that boldly engage the public. She had been involved in international projects which include The European Parliament Visitor Center, The Canadian Museum for Human Rights, "Voices" Exhibition for Universal Forum of Cultures Barcelona 2004, Samsung Seocho Brand Showcase, and "Water for Life" Exhibition, one of Expo Zaragoza 2008's main exhibitions with the sculpture of water Splash which she designed with her partners at Program Collective. She has also worked on branded art installations for Uniqlo and scenography for Premiere Vision.

In addition, she has lectured at international conferences for digital culture and creativity such as Artfutura and Broadcat. Kim has also been an adjunct faculty and thesis advisor at Parsons Paris School of Art and Design, adjunct faculty at IDEP, Istituto Europeo di Design, and guest lecturer at Elisava Masters Program.

Kim has worked internationally in New York, Milan and Barcelona. She is presently based in Paris.

== Awards ==
- 2001 Honor Awards, Society for Environmental Graphic Design, 50 years of TV and more
- 2005 D&AD silver nomination, "Voices"
- 2005 Honor Awards, Society for Environmental Graphic Design, "Voices"
- 2006 Jury for D&AD's Digital Media category
- 2010 Finalist for international art competition "Design As Reform" Vol.2 – Public Installations category, Dubai
- 2014 D&AD Awards: Wood Pencil, Branding / Brand Experience & Environments category, for Uniqlo global campaign
- 2016 AIGA and Design Observer’s 50 Books | 50 Covers competition: 50 Covers Award, for Moowon Book of Stories

== Press & publications ==
- "Uniqlo Recruits Mona Kim Projects to Create Holiday Windows in New York", WWD (Women's Wear Daily)
- "Future Experience of Retail", BrandD Magazine
- "Mona Kim Debuts Moowon Site to Draw Attention to Dying Craftsmanship", WWD
- "Program Collective Suspends a Metallic Splash Sculpture in Spain", DesignBoom
- "Mona Kim Unveils Uniqlo’s Holiday Windows", WWD
- Brand Spaces: Branded Architecture And The Future Of Retail Design, Gestalten
- Out of the Box!: Brand Experience between Pop-Up and Flagship, Gestalten
- Building with Water: Concepts Typology Design, Birkhäuser
- Exhibition Design, Linksbooks
- Souls and Machines, catalog of ArtFutura 2008, ed. Montxo Algora
- I.D., 2008 Sept–Oct
- Domus, 2008 Sept
- Diseno Interior, 2008 August
- Creative Review, 2008 July
- The New York Times, 2008 June 15
- I.D. Annual Design Review, 2005, July/August
- La Vanguardia, 2005, May 15
- The New York Times, 2004 February 13
- El País, 2004 February 21
- Axis, 2003 September
- Diseño Interior, 2003 July
- Trains: Language, Mona Kim 1998
