= Bridge Pavilion =

Building in Zaragoza, Spain

Coordinates: 41°40′00″N 0°54′18″W

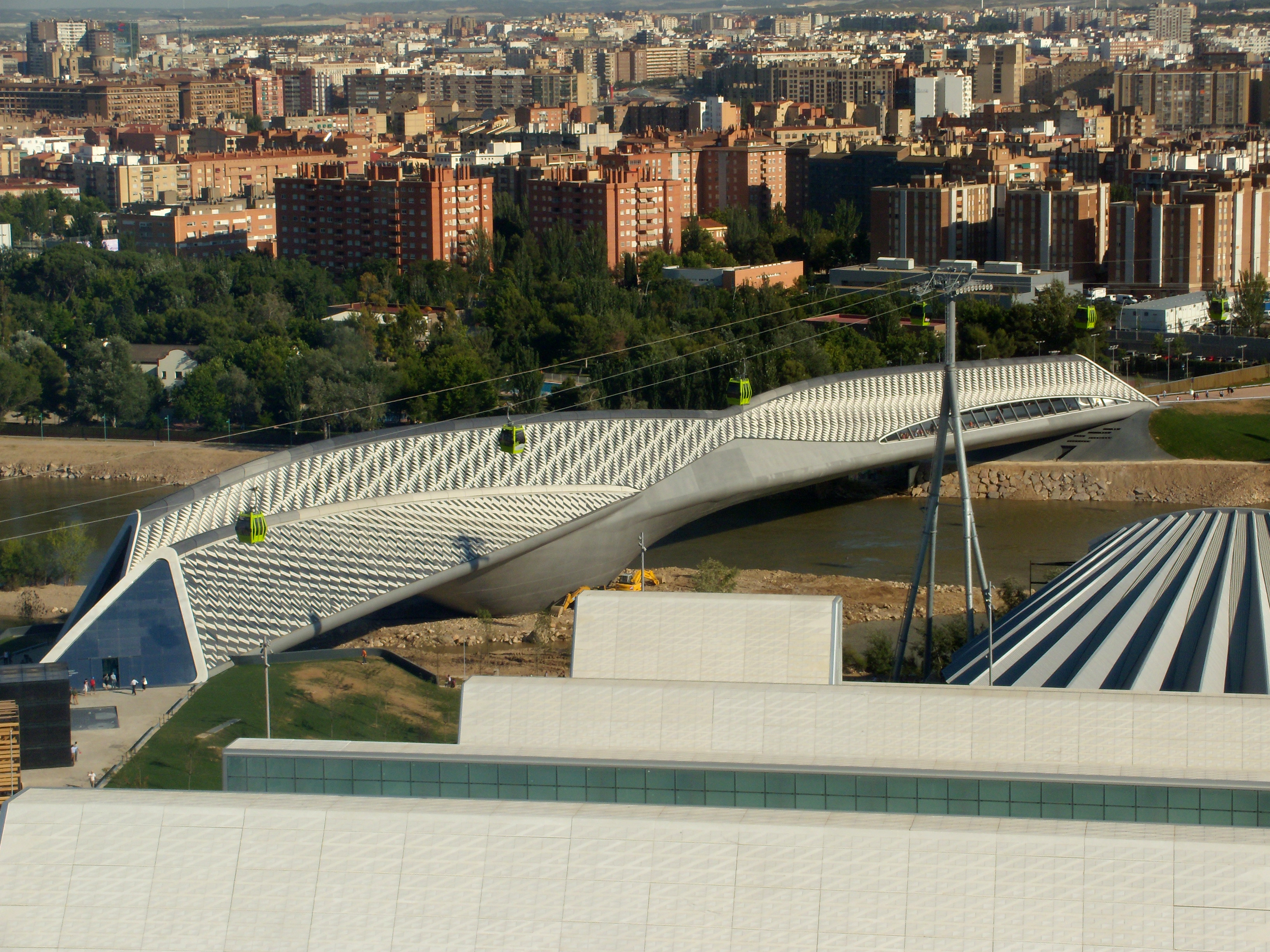
Bridge Pavilion

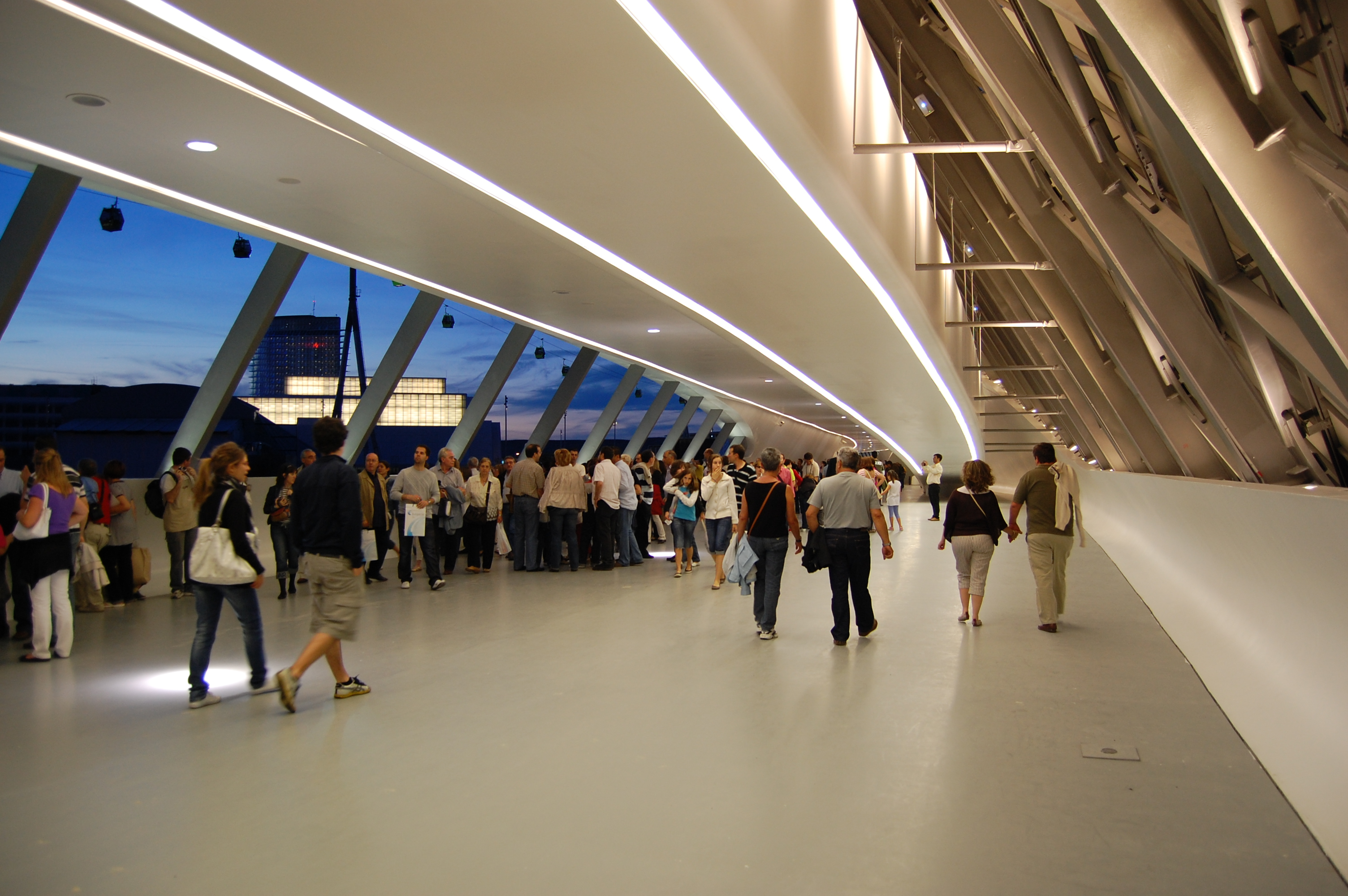
View of Bridge Pavilion, inside.

The Bridge Pavilion (Spanish: Pabellón Puente) is a building designed by British-Iraqi architect Zaha Hadid that was constructed for the Expo 2008 in Zaragoza, Spain as one of its main landmarks. It is an innovative 270-meter-long (890-foot) covered bridge that imitates a gladiola over the river Ebro, connecting the neighbourhood of La Almozara with the exposition site, and thus becoming its main entrance. The new bridge is, at the same time, a multi-level exhibition area; 10,000 visitors per hour were expected to frequent the Pavilion during world exhibition.

Hadid chose fibre glass reinforced concrete from Austrian company Rieder to envelope the bridge: she covered the outer skin of the building with 29,000 triangles of fibreC in different shades of grey.

During the Expo 2008, the Bridge Pavilion hosted an exposition called Water – a unique resource, designed by Ralph Appelbaum Associates. When the Expo was over, the building was purchased by the local savings bank Ibercaja to use it as a site for expositions.
