= 2004 Universal Forum of Cultures =

141-day international event that took place in Barcelona, Spain

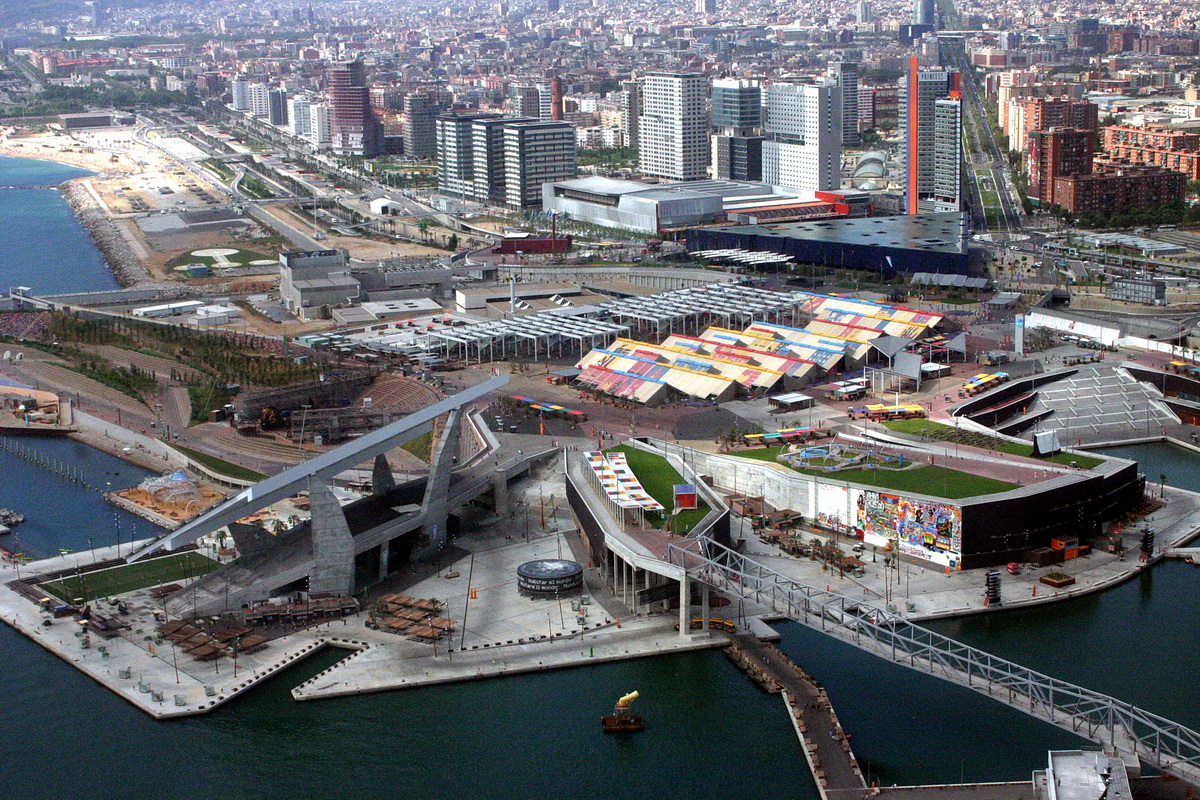
Aerial view of the 2004 Universal Forum of Cultures

The 2004 Universal Forum of Cultures (Catalan: Fòrum Universal de les Cultures, Spanish: Fórum Universal de las Culturas) was a 141-day international event that took place in the Centre de Convencions Internacional de Barcelona (CCIB) and its surrounding venues, Barcelona, Spain from May 9 to September 26, 2004, and was the first edition of the Universal Forum of Cultures. The open space used by the event is now a public park called the Parc del Fòrum.

== History ==
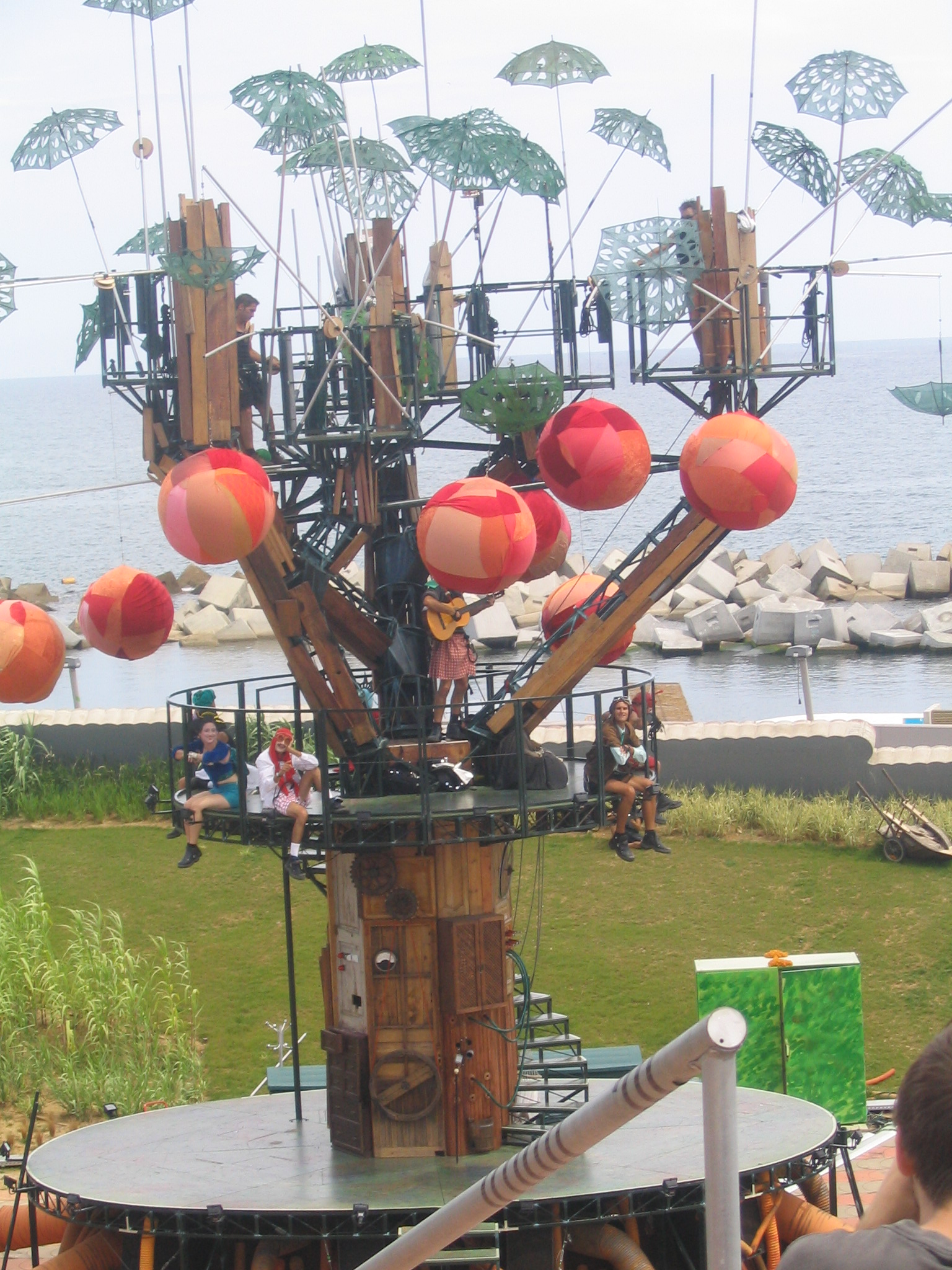
Show "L'Arbre de la Memòria" by Els Comediants, during the 2004 Universal Forum of Cultures

The 2004 Universal Forum of Cultures was organized by Barcelona's city council, the regional government (the Generalitat de Catalunya), the Spanish National Government and UNESCO. It was conceived by its prime mover (Pasqual Maragall, then Mayor of Barcelona) as a way of promoting the city's burgeoning tourist industry in the wake of the 1992 Olympic Games, which were also held in Barcelona. The forum was also politically useful, given the mayor's earlier failure to deliver on a 1996 promise to secure an international exposition for the city.

The official aims of the 2004 Universal Forum of Cultures included support for peace, sustainable development, human rights and respect for diversity.

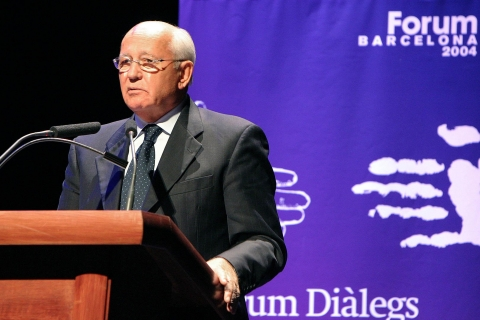
Mikhail Gorbachev at the 2004 Universal Forum of Cultures

The forum hosted more than 40 international conventions (participants included Muhammad Yunus, Juan Antonio Samaranch, Mikhail Gorbachev, José Saramago, Felipe González, Rigoberta Menchú, Angelina Jolie, Robert McNamara, Valéry Giscard d'Estaing, Lionel Jospin, Luiz Inácio Lula da Silva, Romano Prodi and Salman Rushdie, among others), performances, markets, games, 423 concerts, 57 street performances, 44 theatre, dance and cabaret companies, 20 circus acts and over 20 exhibitions.

Josep Acebillo was named Director for Architecture and Infrastructures of the Forum. The events were held at the eastern end of Avinguda Diagonal, a main cross-city artery. The seaside area was developed to house the event. It covered 30 hectares between the Barcelona Olympic port and Sant Adrià de Besòs, and culminated the urban regeneration programme started for the 1992 Olympics. The new site comprises a convention center, central plaza, parks, auditoriums, a new port and a Forum Building (designed by architectural firm Herzog & de Meuron).

In the framework of this Forum, the 4th Porto Alegre Forum of Local Authorities for Social Inclusion was held, which approved the Agenda 21 for culture on 8 May 2004.

== Exhibitions ==
The forum showed four thematic exhibitions, intended to achieve a renewal of ideas and attitudes toward the 21st century, by undertaking a careful analysis of cultural diversity, sustainable development and the conditions for peace:

- Voices. An exhibit (designed by Ralph Appelbaum Associates, creative direction by Mona Kim) of the world's languages to celebrate human communication and linguistic and cultural diversity.
- Inhabiting the World. A study about how humankind relates to the planet's environment. It showed the need to adopt a more rational criteria for the use of natural resources on a planetary scale. It also showed Earth's natural diversity, and the effect caused by human activity, specifically by the phenomenon of urbanization. Finally, exposed the huge consumption and waste production by Western society.
- Cities-Corners. A study about how cities are built. It included models about well known streets and building from the world (Piccadilly Circus in London, Times Square or the Flatiron Building in New York City, La Pedrera in Barcelona, etc.) and maps showing how some cities grew. It also showed about the growing of megacities, like Bombay, Mexico City, Monterrey, Cairo or Istanbul.
- Warriors of Xi'an. An exhibition of Chinese funerary art, based on archaeological finds at the tombs of Qinshihuang and Yangling. Among the pieces displayed, there was an exhibit of terracotta warriors of Xi'an from the Qin dynasty.

Sculptural photovoltaic plate in Forum area

== The place today ==
The central plaza and the open space surrounding forms a public area called Parc del Fòrum, and is now home to several massive events around the year, including the Primavera Sound Festival, Summercase, the Catalonia April Fair and the most popular concerts in La Mercè.

== See also ==
- UNESCO
- Barcelona Development Agenda
- Urban planning of Barcelona
