= Pol Morillas =

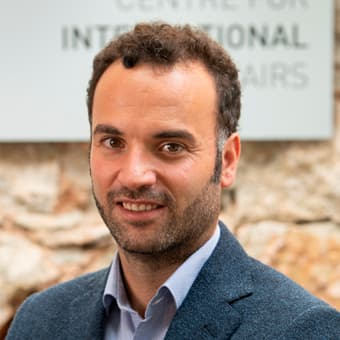
- Born: Pol Morillas i Bassedas; 1982 (age 42–43); Barcelona
- Occupation: political scientist
- Known for: Director of Barcelona Center of International Affairs (2018-)
- Notable work: Strategy-Making in the EU. From Foreign and Security Policy to External Action

Pol Morillas i Bassedas (born 1982) is a professor and political scientist, director of the Barcelona Centre for International Affairs (CIDOB) since September 2018.

With a PhD in Political Science, Public Policy and International Relations from the Autonomous University of Barcelona (UAB) and Master in International Relations from the London School of Economics, he worked as an associate professor at the UAB, being responsible for teaching European Foreign Policy and International relations theory. He is also a member of the European Foreign Policy Observatory. Previously, he had held the positions of head of the Euro-Mediterranean Policy Area at the European Institute of the Mediterranean (IEMed), coordinator of the Political and Security Committee of the Council of the European Union and adviser on External Action at the European Parliament.

As an expert in European politics and foreign policy, he has published numerous research articles in academic journals and participated in think tanks. He has also published opinion articles on the dynamics of European integration, the institutional evolution of the EU's external action, the Common Foreign and Security Policy, the EU's security strategies and Euro-Mediterranean relations. Among others, he published Strategy-Making in the EU. From Foreign and Security Policy to External Action published by Palgrave Macmillan.

On 14 September 2018 the board of CIDOB (Barcelona Center for International Affairs) appointed Pol Morillas as the new director of the entity, replacing Jordi Bacaria. Morillas, who was chosen through an international competition, was a senior researcher for Europe and deputy director of research at the entity. During his term, the organisation celebrated its 50th anniversary.
