= Catalonia April Fair =

Annual event in Barcelona, Spain

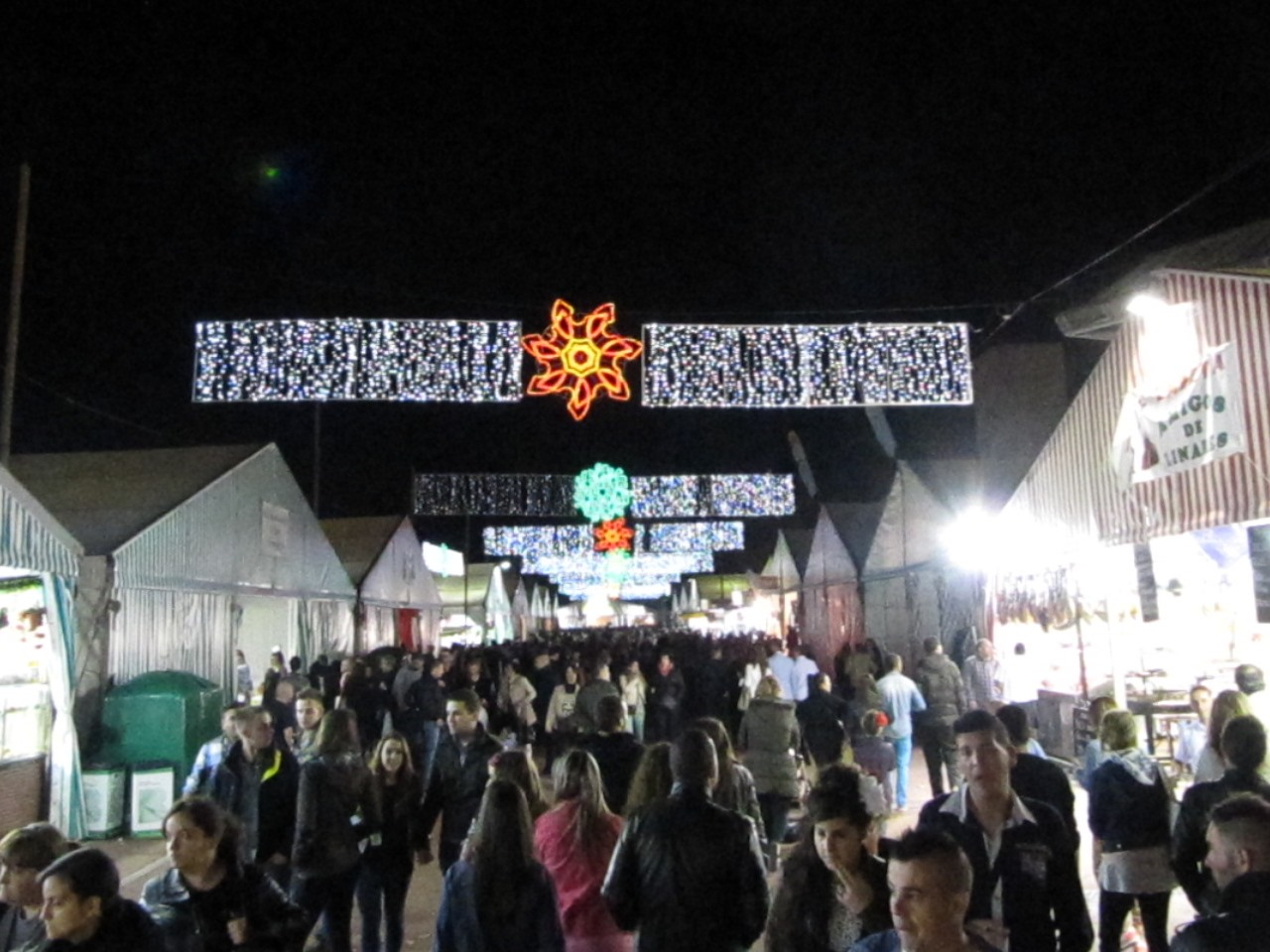
April Fair of Catalonia

The April Fair of Catalonia (Feria de abril de Cataluña) is an annual event held in the Catalan capital of Barcelona, Spain. It usually takes place over the last week of April and the first week of May.

In 1971, immigrants to Barcelona from Andalusia, and their descendants, began their own version of the Seville Fair, Feria de abril de Sevilla. Since then the Barcelona event has grown to become the second largest Spring Fair in Spain.

The fair is currently held at the Parc del Fòrum fairgrounds, a large area on the shores of the Mediterranean, which is covered with rows of casetas, colorfully decorated marquee tents which are temporarily set up. Most of the casetas are sponsored by cultural associations created by and for Andalusian immigrants and their descendants. There are also casetas sponsored by the cultural associations of other ethnic groups, such as Latin Americans and Moroccans, as well as others sponsored by political parties.

A major difference between the Barcelona and Seville events is that the casetas in Barcelona are completely open to the public. In the casetas, food and drink are served, people either dance on dance floors, or are entertained by musical performances, usually by flamenco dancers and singers.

Throughout the fairground, many men, women and children walk around dressed in traditional "trajes de corto" (short jacket, tight trousers and boots) and "trajes de flamenco" (flamenco style dresses).

The main sponsoring organization is FECAC, the Federation of Andalusian Cultural Groups in Catalonia, or Federación de Entidades Culturales Andaluzas en Cataluña.

Also see Fira de Cunit : https://web.archive.org/web/20140503191649/http://www.cunit.cat/noticies/30042014_programa-de-la-quotferia-de-cunit-con-sabor-andaluz-quot
