= Torre del Agua =

Tower in Zaragoza, Spain

Coordinates: 41°40′14″N 0°54′27″W

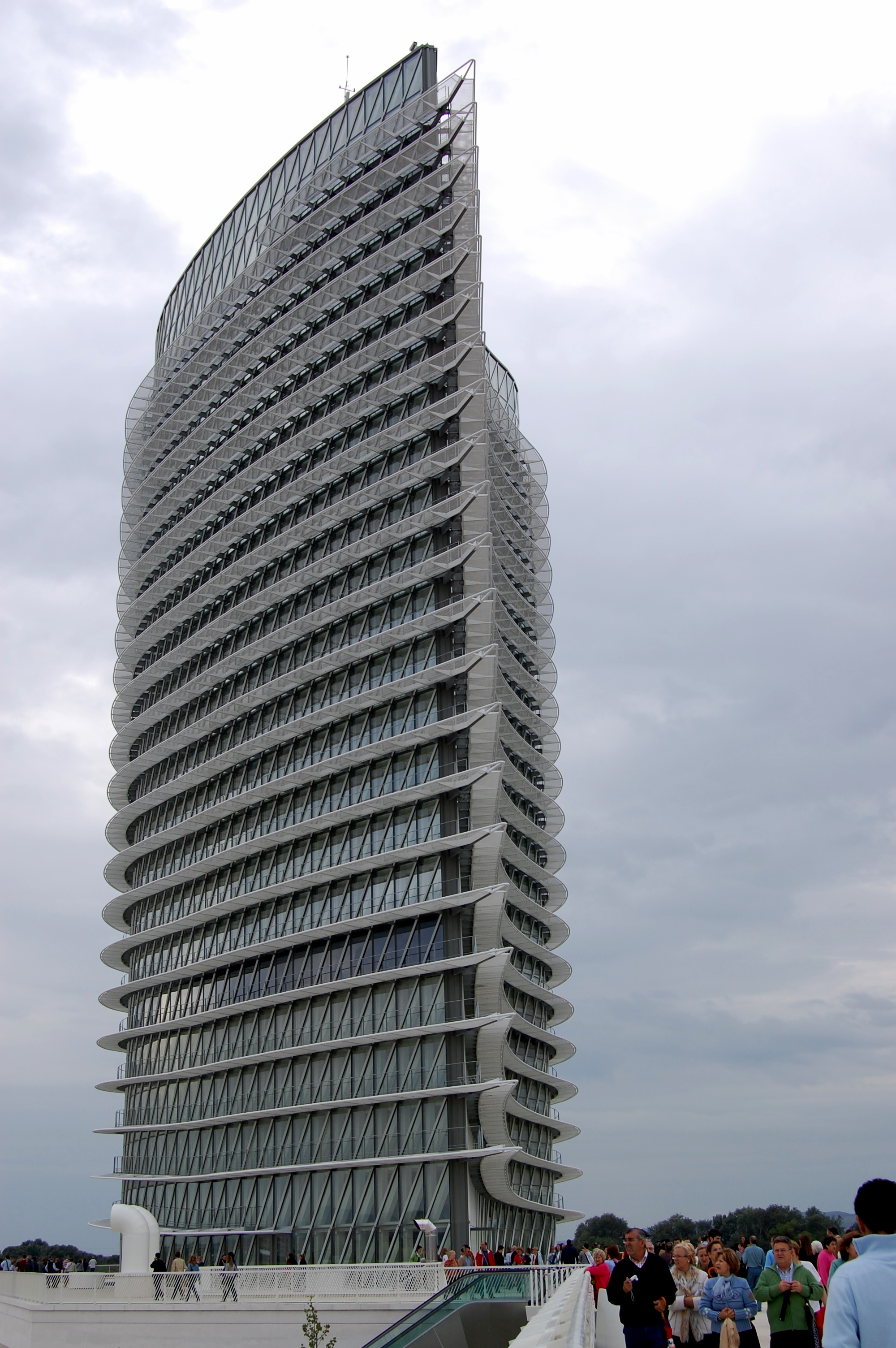
Torre del Agua in Zaragoza.

The Torre del Agua (Spanish: Water Tower) is a 76-metre-high (249 ft) tower built at the Expo 2008 site in Zaragoza, Spain. It was designed by Enrique de Teresa and constructed of concrete, steel and glass.

Seen from above, the structure has a droplet-of-water shape. It consists of a transparent glass design and includes a big three-storey basement. It provides 10,400 accessible square metres, 3,300 square metres (36,000 sq ft) in the basement's floor and the remainder divided between the ramps and flat lands inside the glass tower. There is a 720-square-metre (7,800 sq ft) panoramic bar in the uppermost floor with views over the exposition site and the city.

During Expo 2008, the building hosted the Water for Life exposition.

After the Expo, it was acquired by Caja de Ahorros de la Inmaculada (CAI). On 3 August 2013, it was reopened to the public.
