= Guillermo de la Dehesa =

Spanish economist

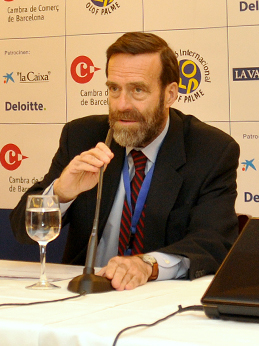

Secretary of State of Economy and Finance
- In office 1986–1988
- Preceded by: Miguel Ángel Fernández Ordóñez
- Succeeded by: Pedro Pérez Fernández

Personal details
- Born: 9 July 1941 (age 85) Madrid, Spain
- Party: Socialist Workers' Party
- Spouse: Michèle Barbé
- Children: 2
- Education: Complutense University of Madrid

Guillermo de la Dehesa Romero (born July 9, 1941) is a Spanish lawyer, economist, politician and businessman. Since leaving politics in 1988 he has been an international advisor to Goldman Sachs.

== Biography ==
Guillermo de la Dehesa was born in Madrid on July 9, 1941. He was educated at Colegio del Pilar, and studied law at the Complutense University of Madrid. After passing the Técnico Comercial y Economista del Estado in 1968, de la Dehesa held various positions in the central government, in both the ministries of commerce, energy, industry and economics and the Bank of Spain. Under the governments of the Socialist Workers' Party (PSOE), he rose to the position of Secretary of State of Economy and Finance (1986–1988).

De la Dehesa joined the private sector in 1988, as Chief Executive Officer of Banco Pastor, President of Gas Madrid, and Consultant to Ibersuizas, Unión Fenosa and Telepizza. De la Dehesa is currently an international advisor to Goldman Sachs, Vice President of Amadeus IT Group, Non-Executive Chairman of Aviva Corporation, Member of the European Advisory Board of Eli Lilly and Company and an Independent Director and Member of the Executive Committee of Banco Santander. He is also Chairman of the Board of the Museo Nacional Centro de Arte Reina Sofía, and a patron of the Museo del Prado and the Círculo de Bellas Artes. De la Dehesa is a contributor to the newspaper El País and an author of several textbooks on economics. He is a member of the Group of Thirty.

He has been Chairman of the Board of Trustees of the Museo Reina Sofía since 2010 and Trustee of the Museo del Prado and the Círculo de Bellas Artes.

He is a member of the Audit Committee of the Board of Directors of Amadeus IT Group (May 2012).
