= Expo 2008 =

International exposition in Zaragoza, Spain

2008 Zaragoza
- Expo 2008 official logo

Overview
- BIE-class: Specialized exposition
- Category: International Recognized Exhibition
- Name: Expo 2008
- Area: 25 hectares (62 acres)
- Visitors: 5,650,941
- Mascot: Fluvi

Participant(s)
- Countries: 104
- Organizations: 21

Location
- Country: Spain
- City: Zaragoza
- Coordinates: 41°40′8.58″N 0°54′10.27″W

Timeline
- Bidding: June 2003
- Awarded: 16 December 2004
- Opening: 14 June 2008
- Closure: 14 September 2008

Specialized expositions
- Previous: Expo '98 in Lisbon
- Next: Expo 2012 in Yeosu

Universal expositions
- Previous: Expo 2005 in Aichi
- Next: Expo 2010 in Shanghai

Horticultural expositions
- Previous: Expo 2006 in Chiang Mai
- Next: Expo 2012 in Venlo

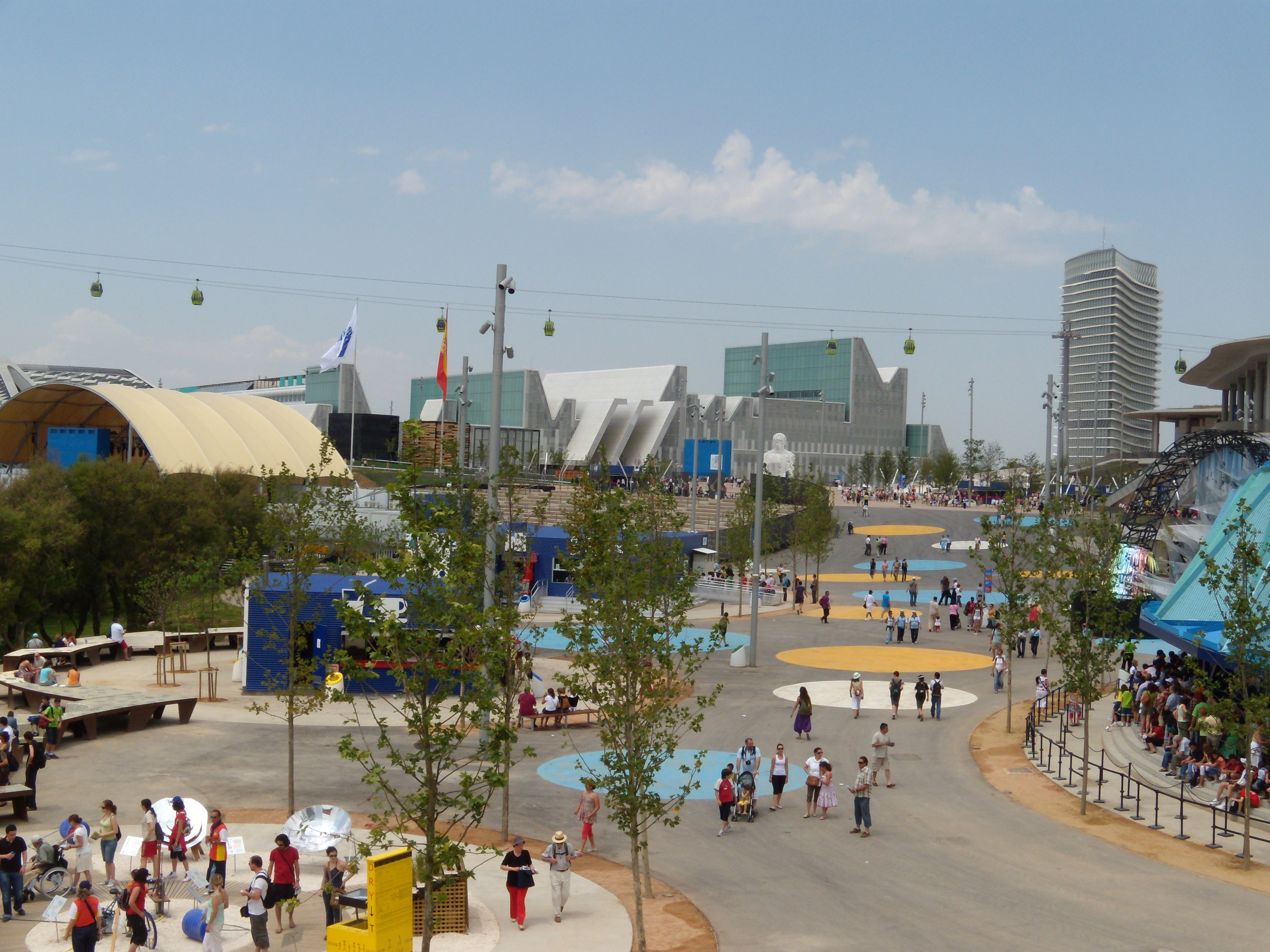
General view of the Expo 2008 site

Expo 2008 was an international exposition held from Saturday 14 June to Sunday 14 September 2008 in Zaragoza, Spain, with the theme of "Water and Sustainable Development". The exposition was placed in a meander of the river Ebro. It was coordinated by the Bureau International des Expositions (BIE), the organization responsible for sanctioning World's Fairs.

Zaragoza, the city of the international exposition, is the administrative and financial capital of the autonomous community of Aragon and Spain's fifth most populous city. It was elected the host city of Expo 2008 on 16 December 2004 by the BIE, beating Thessaloniki (Greece) and Trieste (Italy).

The exhibition's most emblematic buildings were the Torre del Agua, an 76 metres (249 ft) high transparent building designed by Enrique de Teresa to evoke a drop of water, the Bridge Pavilion designed by Zaha Hadid, and the river aquarium. The exposition site also hosted several events, including a daily parade by Cirque du Soleil called The Awakening of the Serpent.

Aside from the countries, non-government organizations and private companies took part in Expo 2008, always with the idea of water and sustainable development. Prior to the event, the Expo 2008 host committee estimated that the exposition could generate €135 million in tickets for admission to the exhibition center.

== Spaces and exhibitions ==
=== Thematic pavilions ===
==== Bridge pavilion ====
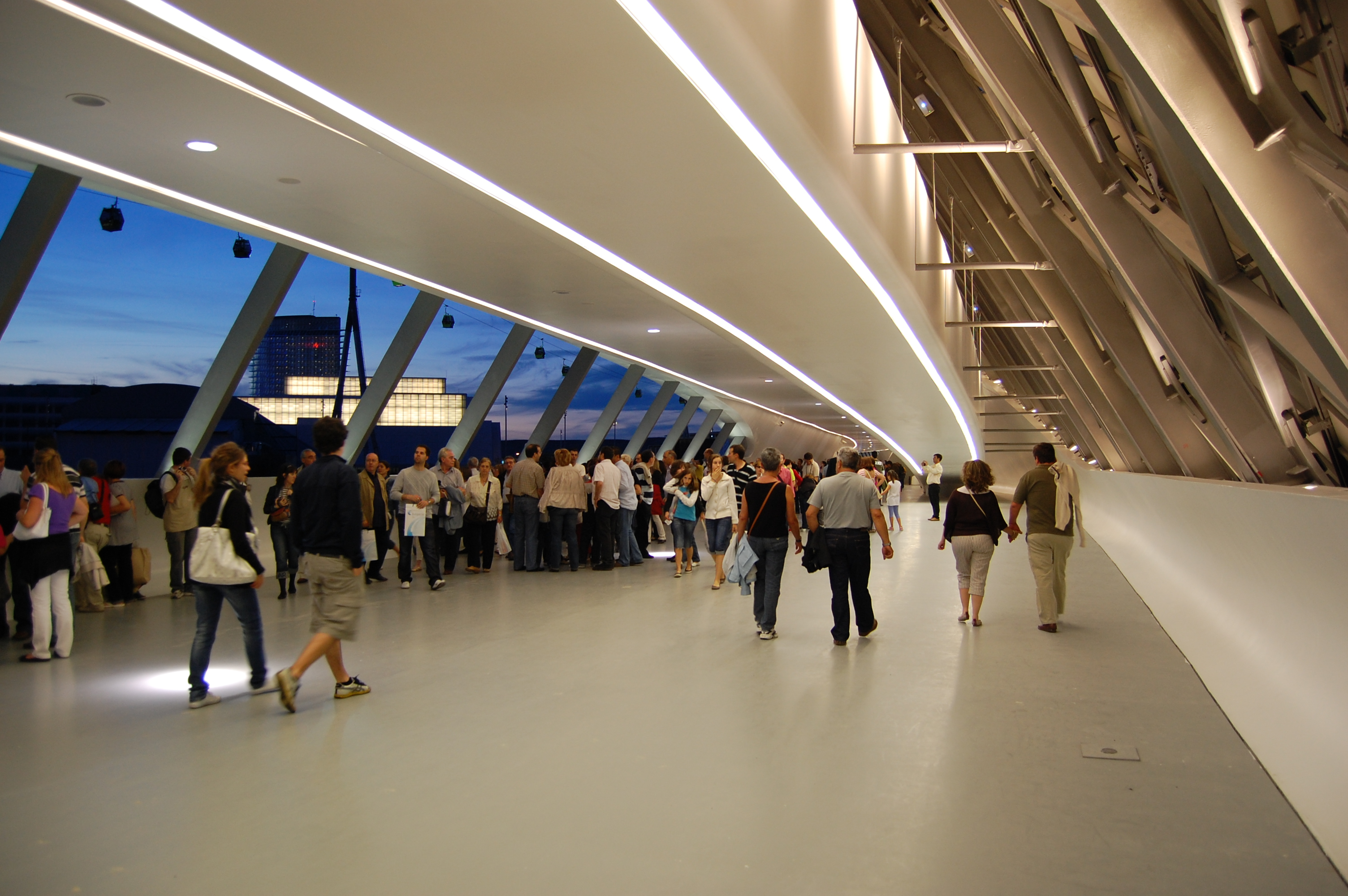
View of Bridge Pavilion, inside.

The Bridge Pavilion was one of the most emblematic buildings of Expo 2008. Designed by Zaha Hadid, it was built in two levels with the shape of a gladiolus opening and closing. It joins the neighborhood of La Almozara and the Expo site with a central island in the river Ebro.

The Bridge Pavilion hosted the exposition Water – a unique resource, designed by Ralph Appelbaum Associates, which tried to present water as a universal human right, to inform visitors how water is a unique resource and to explain water management procedures and encourage citizen participation.

==== Torre del Agua ====
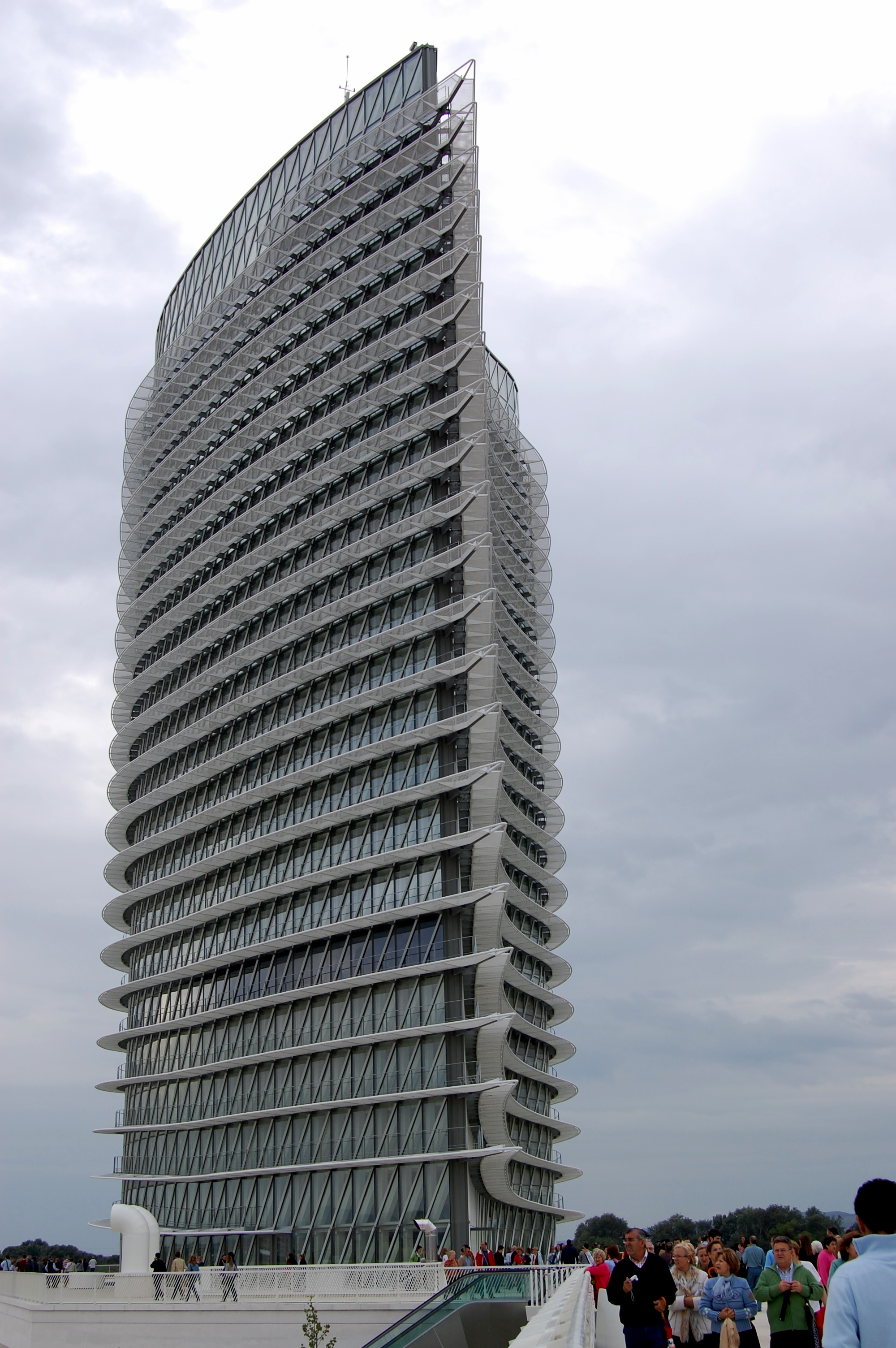
Torre del Agua

The Torre del Agua was another emblematic building of Expo 2008 and its vertical icon. Designed by Enrique de Teresa, it is 76 metres (249 ft) high with 10,400 m^{2} (112,000 sq ft) of floor space. On the top floor, there is a 720 m^{2} (7,800 sq ft) panoramic bar with fantastic views over Zaragoza. Inside the tower there is a 23 metres (75 ft) high sculpture called Splash, which represents a splash of water, "the arrival of life on our planet". The Splash sculpture, based on dynamic simulation systems, was designed by Mona Kim, Todd Palmer, Olga Subirós and Simon Taylor from Program Collective.

The Torre del Agua hosted the exposition Water for life where "audiovisual media and lighting play a key role in the way the contents are communicated".

==== Aquarium ====
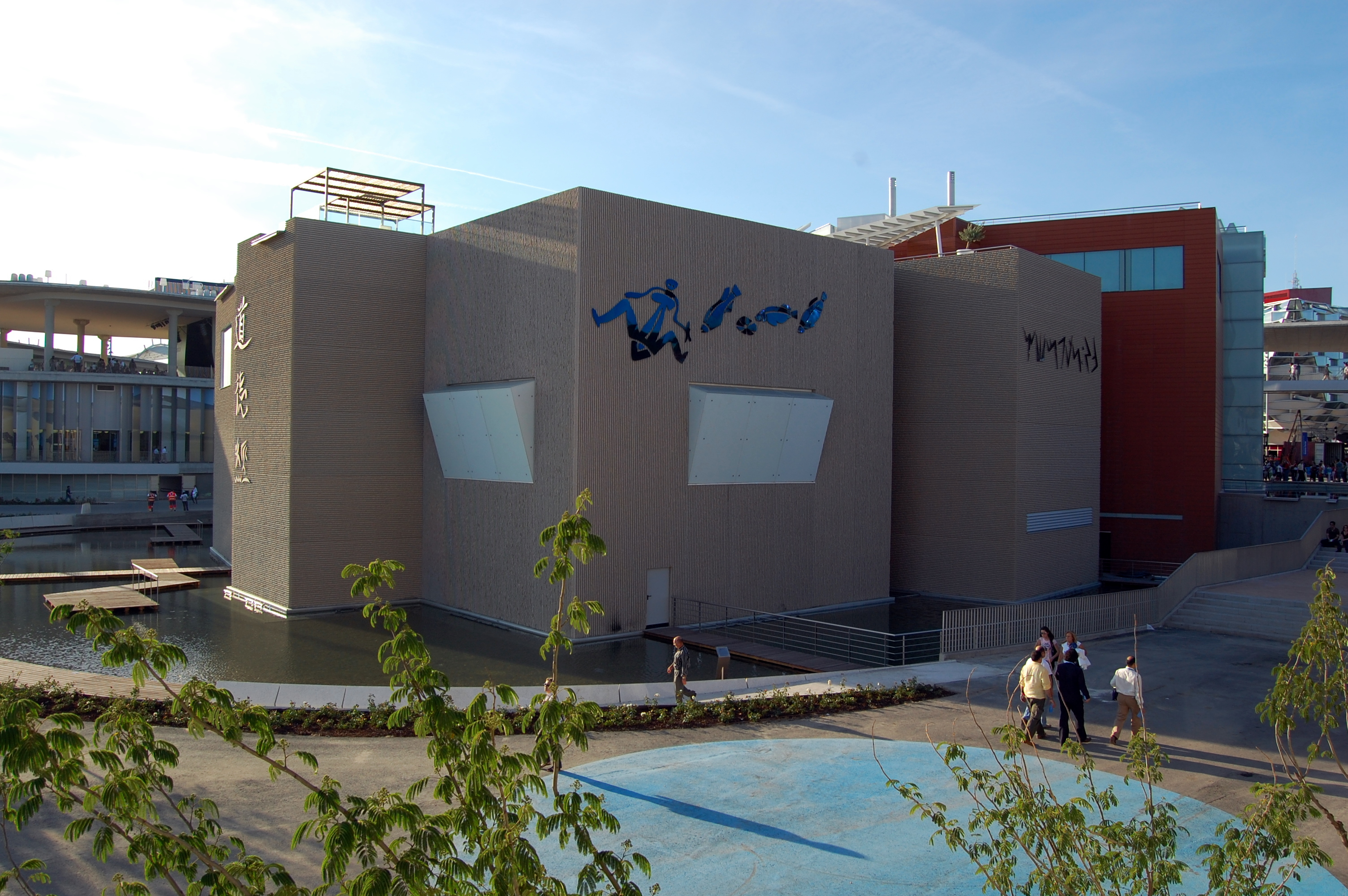
River Aquarium

This thematic pavilion, which remained in operation after the expo, is the biggest freshwater aquarium in Europe, with 300 species of fauna from rivers around the world in 60 tanks or terrariums. Rivers represented are:

- The Nile: It contains species of the great African lakes. It also has crocodiles and an exhibition on the Mediterranean and the Red Sea.
- The Mekong: In this river visitors will find species of the Himalayas, gardens from the river's lower course, the Pacific Ocean and coral reefs.
- The Amazon River: It is divided into three different areas. The first of them is the Amazon jungle with its coconut trees and mangroves. The second area is about the Amazon forest while the third area is the mangrove swamp with an exhibition on the Atlantic Ocean.
- The Murray-Darling river: This exhibition begins in the flooded regions and goes through desert areas. It finishes with a video exhibition about birds.
- The Ebro: It is also represented in two areas. The first area is a mountain cave and the second is the course of the river. There will also be an exhibition on the Mediterranean Sea.
- The "World River": It represents the past, when "all the continents were united as a single island surrounded by ocean".

=== Thematic squares ===
==== Thirst ====
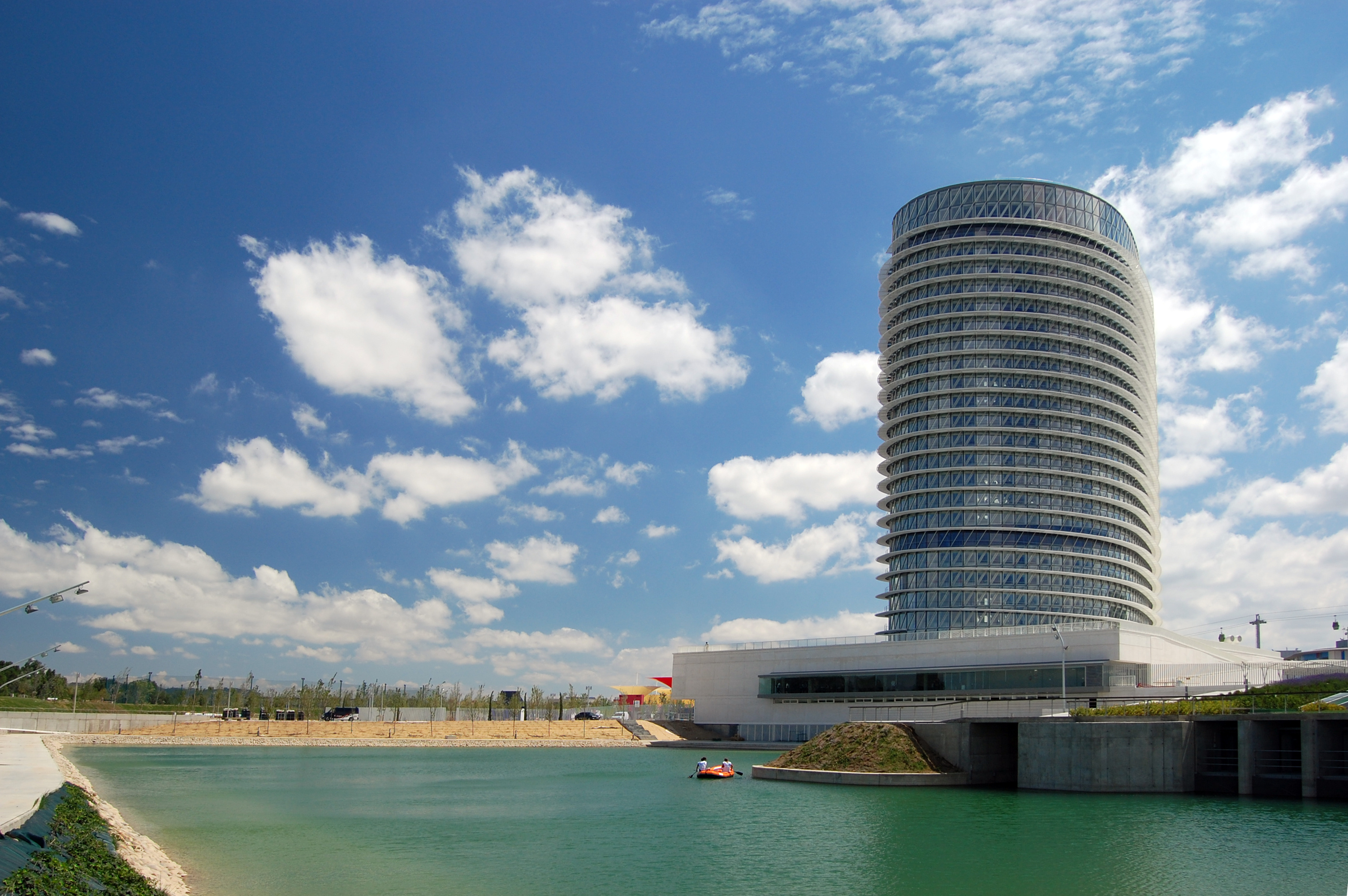
View of the Torre del Agua

This thematic square employed mirrors, audiovisual projections and combinations of light and sound to create optical illusions. It was 46.7 metres (153 ft) in diameter, covering a total area of 1,640 m^{2} (17,700 sq ft) of which 820 m^{2} (8,800 sq ft) were the exposition area.

==== Igloo of salt ====
Designed by Cloud 9 / Enric Ruiz-Geli, this plaza's architecture was that of an enigmatic building. It was an inflatable structure covered with salt that reflected the sun's rays and lit up at night as if it had stored all of the necessary energy to continue to function.

This themed plaza was designed according to Expo 2008's sustainability criteria: the use of PVC was avoided in electrical wiring, as well as tropical wood, synthetic varnish or solvent-based paints; taps made use of water-saving systems. Additionally, the frame was hired out to avoid having to demolish it once the expo was complete.

The use of EFTE in the building's three-layered roof made air conditioning unnecessary. One of the EFTE layers was silver-plated to refract light and prevent outside heat from penetrating the building; air in the inflatable components and a Brine system irrigating them cooled the interior. All of this created a temperate building, meaning that the climate control system only needed to work against body heat produced by visitors and heat given off by equipment used in the exhibition. This way the organisers could make use of a system that was much more sustainable and inexpensive than conventional air conditioning.

==== Cities of water ====
This square had no walls, so its contents were visible from outside. The exhibit was about water as an "urban resource" and a "natural element in the process of improving quality of life in cities".

==== Extreme water ====
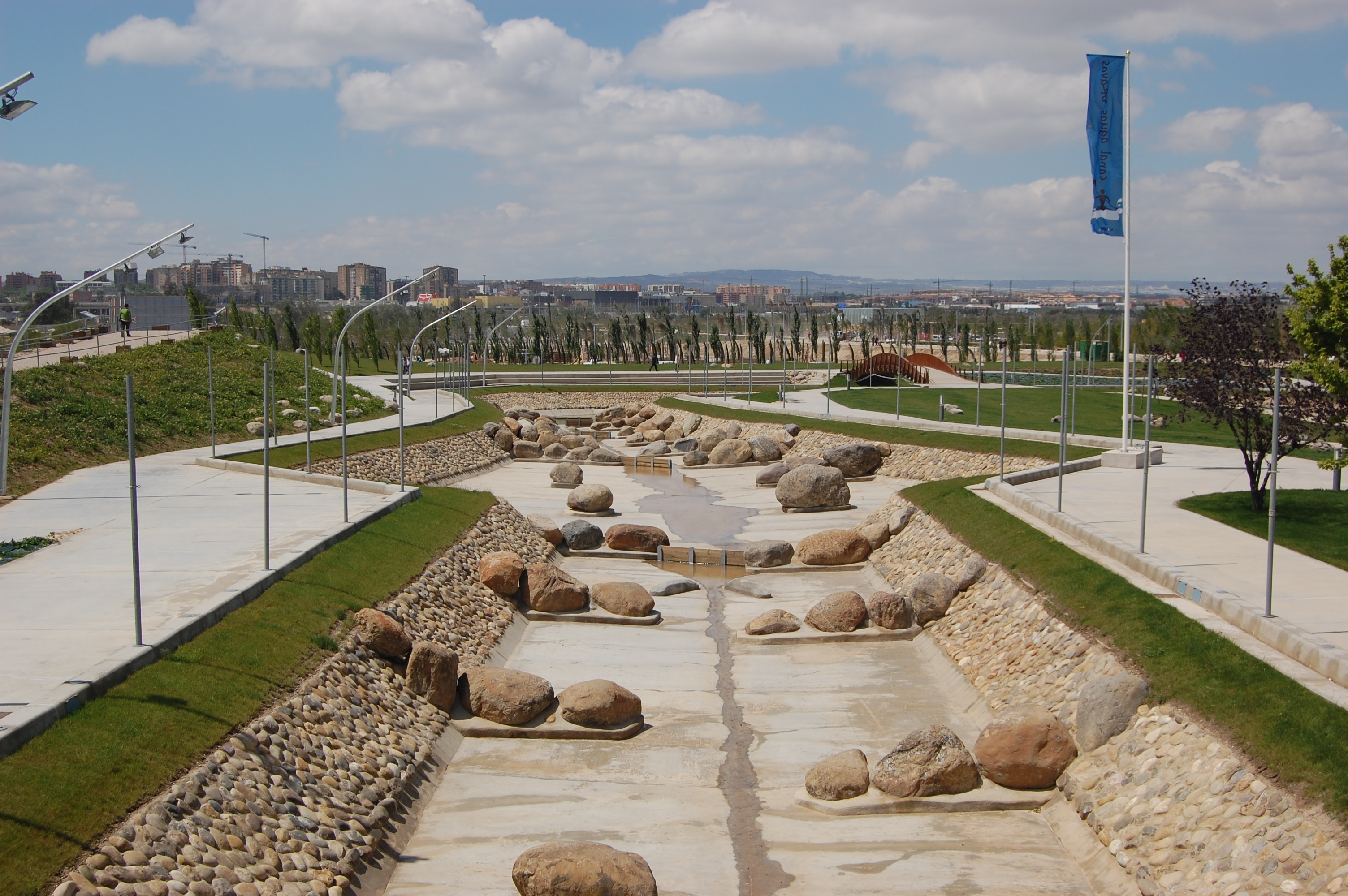
Channel of brave waters

This square symbolised the moment when a wave breaks on the beach. It was divided into two areas: the first was the sensorial area with 120 mobile seats where audiovisuals were projected; the second was the ideas area with interactive platforms, images and texts about water and its risks.

==== Oikos, water and energy ====
This exhibit was about getting energy from water.

==== Shared water ====
This thematic square showed visitors how political divisions affect the management of water.

==== Aquatic inspirations ====
This square hosted the show El hombre vertiente, created by the Argentine Pichón Baldinu, six times a day.

=== Participants pavilion ===
==== Country pavilions ====
More than one hundred countries, plus dozens of companies and NGOs, participated in Expo 2008. The confirmed list had these 104 countries (arranged in alphabetical order):

Participating nations

- Algeria
- Andorra
- Angola
- Antigua and Barbuda
- Argentina
- Austria
- Bahamas
- Barbados
- Belgium
- Belize
- Bolivia
- Brazil
- Bulgaria
- Cameroon
- Cape Verde
- China
- Colombia
- Costa Rica
- Croatia
- Cuba
- Cyprus
- Denmark
- East Timor
- Dominica
- Dominican Republic
- Ecuador
- Equatorial Guinea
- Egypt
- El Salvador
- Ethiopia
- France
- Germany
- Greece
- Grenada
- Guatemala
- Guyana
- Haiti
- Honduras
- Hungary
- India
- Indonesia
- Italy
- Jamaica
- Japan
- Jordan
- Kazakhstan
- Kenya
- South Korea
- Kuwait
- Libya
- Lithuania
- Malaysia
- Mali
- Malta
- Mauritania
- Mexico
- Monaco
- Mongolia
- Morocco
- Mozambique
- Namibia
- Nepal
- Netherlands
- Nicaragua
- Niger
- Nigeria
- North Macedonia
- Oman
- Pakistan
- Panama
- Paraguay
- Peru
- Philippines
- Poland
- Portugal
- Qatar
- Romania
- Russia
- Saint Kitts and Nevis
- Saint Vincent and the Grenadines
- Saint Lucia
- Saudi Arabia
- Senegal
- Slovakia
- Solomon Islands
- South Africa
- Spain
- Sudan
- Suriname
- Sweden
- Switzerland
- Tanzania
- Thailand
- Trinidad and Tobago
- Tunisia
- Turkey
- Uganda
- United Arab Emirates
- Uruguay
- Vanuatu
- Vatican City
- Venezuela
- Vietnam
- Yemen

The 17 autonomous communities of Spain and two autonomous cities of Ceuta and Melilla also participated, as did as the United Nations and the European Union.

The pavilions for official participants were divided into eight large buildings and into five differentiated eco-geographical areas within the Expo 2008 Exposition site. Those areas were:

- Islands and Coasts
- Oasis
- Ice and snow
- Temperate Forests
- Tropical Rainforests
- Mountains and High Plains
- Grasslands, Steppes and Savannahs
- Rivers and Flat plains

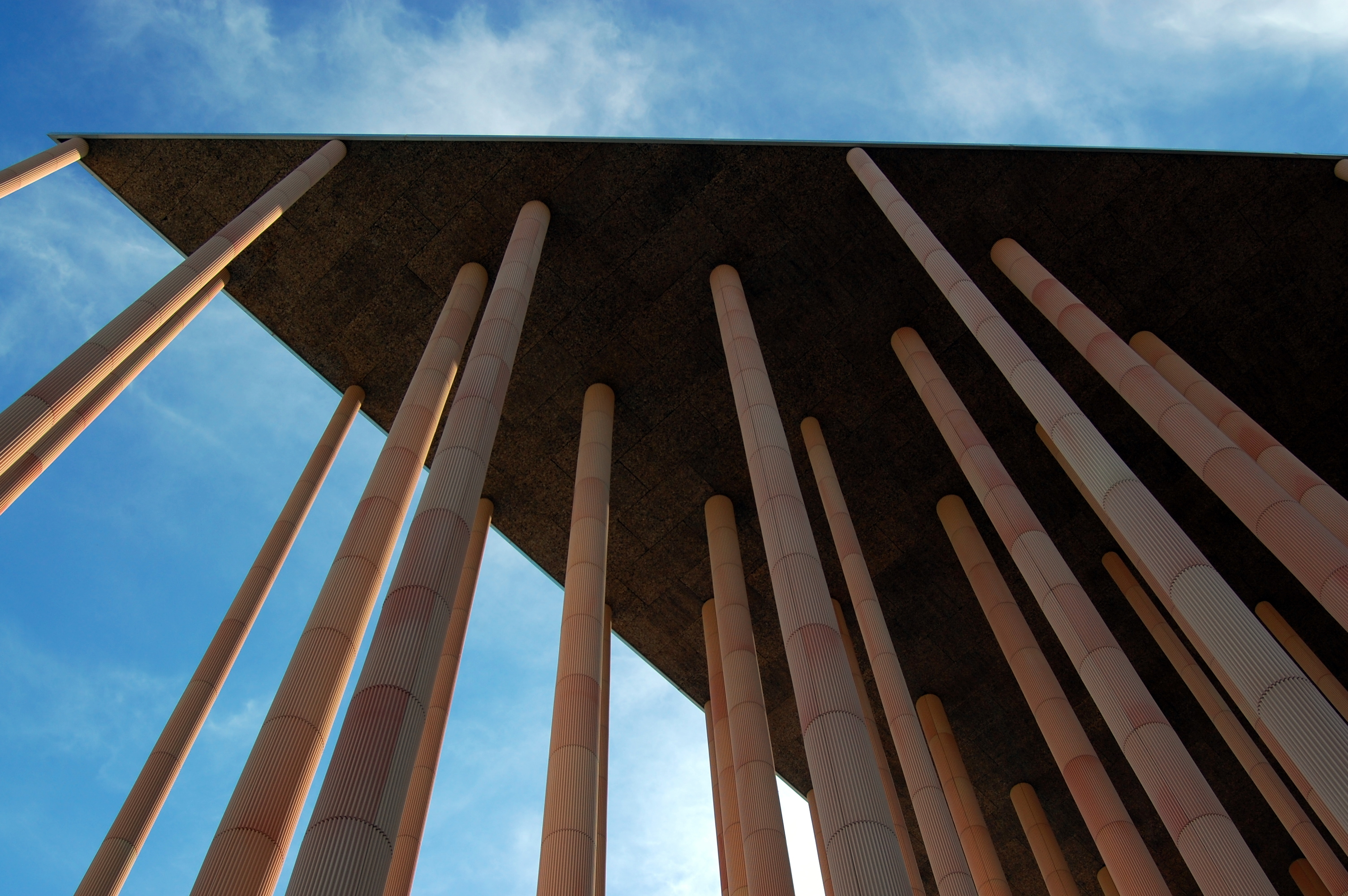
Pavilion of Spain

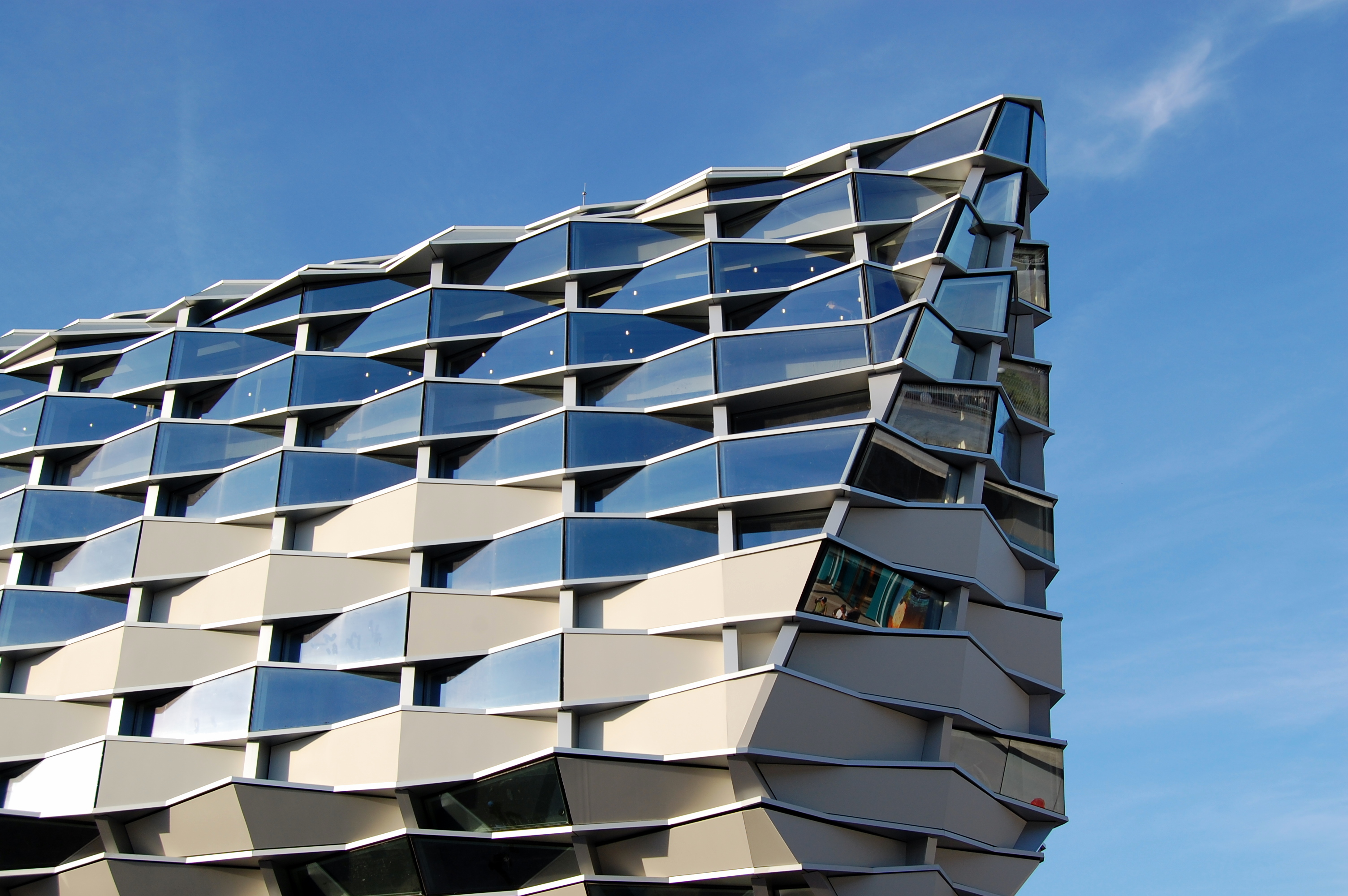
Pavilion of Aragon

The joint pavilions corresponding to the eco-geographic areas of Grasslands, Steppes and Savannahs, Tropical Rainforests and Islands and Coasts, were built by the organisers to house the pavilions of countries of Sub-Saharan Africa, Latin America and the Caribbean Community (CARICOM), respectively. The total surface area of the participating countries pavilions was 61,667 m^{2} (663,780 sq ft).

Spain and the region of Aragon, as hosts, had their own separate pavilions. The Pavilion of Spain was designed by Patxi Mangado, and the Pavilion of Aragon, which resembled local basketweaving, by Daniel Olano.

==== Citizen's initiative pavilion ====
This pavilion had the shape of a beacon, "a symbol of hope for the future of water in our world". It expressed the vitality of ordinary people and non-governmental organisations. The Beacon was situated by the Bridge Pavilion entrance.

=== Gold Prize award ===
The Philippines, on 19 September 2008 won the "Gold Prize", the Expo's highest award for a participating country. The award noted the quality of the Philippine pavilion's internal and external décor, consisting of 1,000 crystal-like bubble sand, as well as its functionality, which had supreme relevance to the exposition's theme of "Water and Sustainable Development". Tourism Secretary Joseph Ace Durano said "this recognition is truly well-deserved as our country’s wealthy aquatic life has been captured by the equally rich imagination of our fellowmen. While other countries utilized ultra modern technology, we chose to highlight more community-involved practices as well as natural land irrigation, aquatic recreation and marine resources preservation". The Philippine pavilion's attractions included the meeting of the two mascots, Fluvi and Filippo, and "Filipinas Te Espera Nights", a series of marketing events.

== Shows ==
Expo 2008 had a 93-day-long show programme with more than 3,400 acts from more than 350 companies and artists. On the expo site, there were three shows called major events. They were:

=== Iceberg ===
This show was intended to be the artistic part of the Opening Ceremony, although the flood of the river Ebro in the previous days forced plans to change, as the set was situated in the middle of the river. Nevertheless, the show was presented each night starting on 20 June. The Spanish director Calixto Bieito and the scenographer Alfons Flores were responsible for the set design while the music was by José Luis Romeo. The show had a huge iceberg with a minute human figure designed by the Catalan company FOCUS.

=== El hombre vertiente ===
This show, created by the Argentine Pichón Baldinu, was the artistic part of the Opening Ceremony on 13 June 2008, in replacement of Iceberg. It repeated six times throughout the day at the thematic square Water Inspirations.

=== The Awakening of the Serpent ===
This water-themed parade took place every day at the Expo site as The Awakening of the Serpent wandered around the site. The parade's creative director was Jean François Brouchard and its artistic director Julien Gabriel. Canada's Cirque du Soleil participated with acrobats, actors, gymnasts, singers and musicians.

=== Bob Dylan and additional American artists ===
Expo 2008 officially opened with a concert by Bob Dylan, the Official Artist of Expo 2008.

Additional American artists scheduled to perform on the evening entertainment stage included Patti Smith, Robert Cray, Keb Mo, Ruben Blades, Canadian Diana Krall, Stray Cats, Los Lobos and Gloria Estefan. A performance by Philip Glass closed Expo 2008.

== Mascot ==
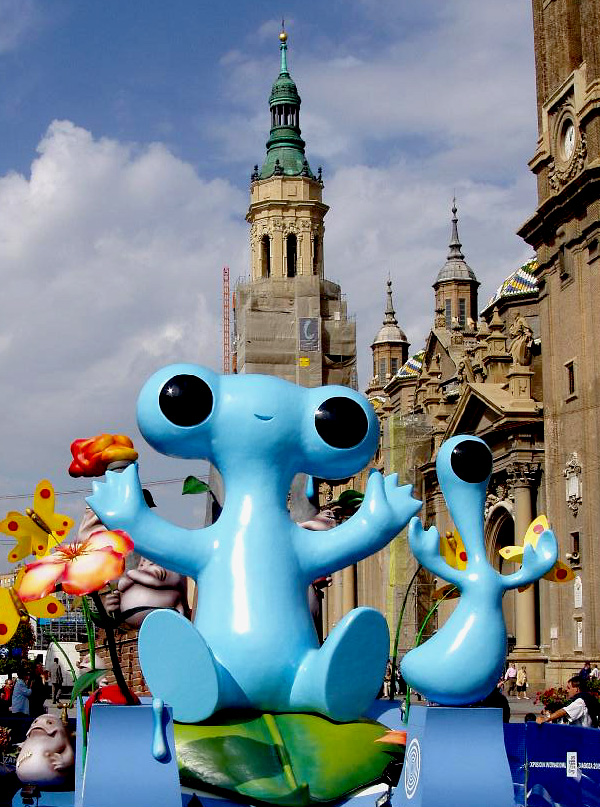
Statue of Fluvi and Ica next to Cathedral-Basilica of Our Lady of the Pillar

The Expo 2008 mascot was Fluvi, a little anthropomorphic drop of water.

With her best friend Ica, the smallest drop of water, and Nico and Laurita, she fought against the pollution made by Sec and Raspa, the evil Negas.

Several postal services, including Correos in Spain and Qatar Post in Qatar, issued postage stamps commemorating Expo 2008 which pictured Fluvi.

== After the Expo ==
The exposition site and its facilities were planned thinking of their usage as a new extension of the city when the Expo finished in September 2008. The expectation was that some the buildings would be rented or transferred to several institutions. The Aragon Pavilion was to be converted into the head office of a regional ministry, while the landmark buildings of the Expo, the Torre del Agua and the Bridge Pavilion, were expected to be purchased by local financial institutions. The Spanish Pavilion was expected to be used by the University of Zaragoza to set up a new school of architecture.

The international pavilions were to be remodelled and converted into offices so that the site would become the main business park in Zaragoza. This space was also to have recreational establishments and restaurants.

Other expectations were that a great part of the site would be used for shopping establishments and for the construction of a science park for businesses.

The Aquarium, as the largest freshwater aquarium in Europe, has continued operation till the present day.
