= Initiative for Policy Dialogue =

Organization based at Columbia University

The Initiative for Policy Dialogue (IPD) is a non-profit organization based at Columbia University in the United States.

IPD was founded in July 2000 by Joseph E. Stiglitz. It stimulates a heterodox policy dialogue on major issues in international development. IPD is a global network of leading economists, political scientists, and premier academic and policy centers in the global South and North. It brings the issues of developing countries to academics and the fruits of academic research to policymakers.

== Description ==
Nobel Laureate Joseph Stiglitz founded the Initiative for Policy Dialogue (IPD) in July 2000, a few months after leaving his post as Chief Economist of the World Bank. Stiglitz’s years at the Bank convinced him that the developing world and emerging markets needed a more authoritative voice in global policy discussions. They also needed better advice on how to manage their economic, political and social affairs beyond the neoliberal Washington Consensus doctrines then sold as “good policy.” Stiglitz was appalled to see international financial institutions foisting these conservative policies on developing countries, often with the support of progressive, advanced countries that had rejected the same policies within their own borders. He witnessed too large a gap between high-minded rhetoric and the actual power plays that drove global governance, with the exercise of power tilting policies away from those that might have advanced the wellbeing of poor countries.

IPD’s strategy has been to bring together the international scholars from both developed and developing countries to address the hard and controversial issues facing the global community related to globalization and development. The think tank was founded on two hypotheses: Good ideas matter; And that Gresham’s law, which says bad money drives out good money, might similarly work in the realm of ideas, with bad ideas driving out good ideas. With a good articulation of theoretically sound ideas and democratic dialogue, good ideas might displace bad ones.

From the start, IPD was committed to advancing and disseminating knowledge in the belief that better knowledge would lead to better policies and institutions and would enhance the wellbeing of people everywhere, but especially in the developing world. Knowledge is a global public good, and the functioning of democracy requires citizens to be informed. To that end, IPD has fostered conversations not just among economists, but dialogues within countries between citizens, leaders in both the public and private sector and civil society, and leading economists. It has fostered discussions around central themes in development, globalization, and public policy, hosting multiple high-level conferences each year; and partly based on those discussions—and with the belief that the knowledge and understandings generated in them should be shared—has produced a book series with more than 50 volumes. It also publishes an academic, peer-review journal: the Journal of Globalization and Development (JGD).

== Themes ==
IPD traditionally organized its work through task forces focused on specific issues. Today, these efforts are grouped under seven broader themes that guide our current projects. These themes are Global Governance, Development, The State, Macroeconomics, Debt and Global Finance, Industrial Policy, and Media and Development.

1. Macroeconomics

IPD’s Macroeconomics theme focuses on the stability and efficiency of the system. Projects under this theme examine neoliberal frameworks and propose alternative analytical constructions, with a focus on expectations formation, the nature of shocks and propagation, and the dynamic properties of the system when inconsistencies – including unsustainable debts – get revealed. IPD conducts and publishes macroeconomics research and frameworks that recognize the importance of connecting macroeconomic theories to real economic conditions, policy proposals, and outcomes.

2. Media and Development

IPD’s Media and Development theme highlights the critical role of journalism and media in fostering economic development and provides resources to support effective media practices globally. It draws from extensive research, practical tools, and professional training to empower media practitioners and organizations in their work. IPD’s projects on media and development emphasize the importance of long-term commitments, culturally relevant solutions, and holistic approaches that combine journalism training with advocacy, business strategies, and sustainable practices.

3. Global Governance

IPD's Global Governance theme focuses on analyzing and advancing the understanding of the global economic architecture in an interconnected world. The overarching objective of IPD's work on global governance is to contribute to improving the design of global policies for the welfare of the broader global population. It recognizes global governance as an important mechanism for promoting international cooperation. Additionally, it highlights how global governance can address issues across national borders, such as economic and social inequalities, environmental sustainability, the international financial, tax, trade, and knowledge architecture, and global security challenges.

4. Development

IPD's Development theme focuses on critical issues around capital market liberalization, climate change, Latin America and China economic relations, poverty, trade, migration, the resource curse, and financing for development. It explores development through a comprehensive framework by integrating economic development, poverty reduction, social inclusion, and environmental sustainability. IPD leads research efforts to develop a new understanding of context-specific policies that can overcome past economic failures in emerging markets and developing economies. These policies aim to promote sustainable growth that fosters equal opportunities, particularly within vulnerable and fragile economic contexts.

5. The State

IPD’s State theme focuses on the role of the state for contributing to economic and social development. It also analyzes how state reforms have affected development in Latin America, Africa, and Asia. IPD seeks to advance the understanding of the role of the state through research, critical analysis of policies, and inclusive public policy dialogue.

6. Debt and Global Finance

IPD’s Debt and Global Finance theme encompasses work related to research and policy development related to the global financial architecture and debt sustainability. IPD experts develop research and policy recommendations focusing on issues such as taxation, sovereign debt, and international financial institutions. In particular, IPD has facilitated new publications related to the growing sovereign debt crisis being experienced by developing countries. Further, it has developed potential reforms to international lending practices, sovereign debt resolution processes, and legal frameworks in jurisdictions where debt is issued. IPD also convenes global leaders representing academia, international creditors, civil society, policymakers, and religious organizations to develop potential solutions and contribute to efforts to enact policy change that will reduce the ongoing debt crisis in the developing world.

7. Industrial Policy

IPD’s Industrial Policy theme encompasses multiple projects aimed at generating knowledge on institutional frameworks that support the design and implementation of industrial policy in Africa, Asia, Latin America, and the United States. This includes exploring global and regional governance mechanisms that facilitate effective and equitable industrial policy. IPD defines industrial policy as a government policy that targets the transformation of the structure of the economy in pursuit of some public goal — without which would not be achieved in the decentralized market solution.

== Funders and Partners ==
IPD is supported by and collaborative with a large number of governments, foundations, and international organizations, including but not limited to Alfred P. Sloan Foundation, Banco Nacional de Desenvolvimento Econômico e Social (BNDES), Canadian International Development Agency (CIDA), Charles Stewart Mott Foundation, Development Bank of Latin America (CAF), Foundation for European Progressive Studies (FEPS), Ford Foundation, Friedrich Ebert Stiftung (FES), Groundwork Collaborative, Institute for New Economic Thinking (INET), Japan International Cooperation Agency (JICA), John D. and Catherine T. MacArthur Foundation, Open Society Foundations (OSF), Rockefeller Brothers Fund, Swedish International Development Cooperation Agency (SIDA), United Nations Development Programme (UNDP), William and Flora Hewlett Foundation.

It has partnered with many organizations and governments, including Boston University’s Global Development Policy Center (GDPC), Center for Economic Policy Research (CEPR), Center for International Governance Innovation (CIGI), Center for Political Economy at Columbia World Projects (CPE), Columbia’s Institute of Latin American Studies, Independent Commission on Reform of International Corporate Taxation (ICRIT), Institute of Global Politics (IGP), International Monetary Fund (IMF), Jubilee USA, Paris School of Economics’ Finance for Development Lab (FDL), Sciences Po, Suramericana Vision, The Pontifical Academy of Sciences (PASS) at the Vatican, The Roosevelt Institute, University College London’s Institute for Innovation and Public Purpose, UNAIDS, and the World Bank.

== IPD book series ==
IPD books delve deeper into alternatives for prevailing issues by examining the central issues in contention, as well as the impacts on different groups, the risks associated with each alternative, and an analysis and interpretation of the experiences of those who have tried each. These books are unique in that they are geared toward policymakers and civil society and are written as part of a collaborative process, bringing in voices from both the North and South. The books lay out policy options including the risks and trade offs inherent in each that allow for a more meaningful discourse.

=== List of Books ===
- The Great Polarization: How Ideas, Power, and Policies Drive Inequality edited by Rudiger L. von Arnim and Joseph E. Stiglitz (Columbia University Press, 2022)
- Trapped in the Middle?: Development Challenges for Middle-Income Countries edited by José Antonio Alonso and José Antonio Ocampo (Oxford University Press, 2022)
- The Quality of Growth in Africa edited by Ravid Kanbur, Akbar Noman, and Joseph E. Stiglitz (Columbia University Press, 2019)
- International Policy Rules and Implementation edited by José Antonio Ocampo (Columbia University Press, 2019)
- The Future of Development Banks edited by Stephany Griffith-Jones and José Antonio Ocampo (Oxford University Press, 2019)
- Toward a Just Society edited by Martín Guzmán (Columbia University Press, 2018)
- The World Economy through the Lens of the United Nations edited by José Antonio Ocampo, Anis Chowdhury, Diana Alarcón (Oxford University Press, 2018)
- The Welfare State Revisited edited by José Antonio Ocampo and Joseph E. Stiglitz (Columbia University Press, 2018)
- Efficiency, Finance, and Varieties of Industrial Policy: Guiding Resources, Learning and Technology for Sustained Growth edited by Akbar Noman and Joseph E. Stiglitz (Columbia University Press, 2016)
- Global Governance and Development edited by José Antonio Ocampo (Oxford University Press, 2016)
- Rethinking Capitalism: Economics and Policy for Sustainable and Inclusive Growth edited by Michael Jacobs and Mariana Mazzucato (Wiley-Blackwell, 2016)
- Too Little, Too Late: The Quest to Resolve Sovereign Debt Crises edited by Martín Guzmán, José Antonio Ocampo, and Joseph E. Stiglitz (Oxford University Press, 2016)
- Achieving Financial Stability and Growth in Africa edited by Stephany Griffith-Jones and Ricardo Gottschalk (Routledge, 2016)
- Macroeconomics and Development: Roberto Frenkel and the Economics of Latin America edited by Mario Damill, Martín Rapetti, and Guillermo Rozenwurcel (Columbia University Press, 2016)
- Industrial Policy and Economic Transformation in Africa edited by Akbar Noman and Joseph E. Stiglitz (Columbia University Press, 2015)
- Intellectual Property Rights edited by Mario Cimoli, Giovanni Dosi, Keith E. Maskus, Ruth Okediji, Jerome H. Reichman, and Joseph E. Stiglitz (Oxford University Press, 2015)
- New Perspectives of Migration and International Development edited by Jeronimo Cortina and Enrique Ochoa-Reza (Columbia University Press, 2013)
- The Quest for Security: Protection Without Protectionism and the Challenge for Global Governance edited by Joseph E. Stiglitz and Mary Kaldor (Columbia University Press, 2015)
- Law and Economics with Chinese Characteristics edited by David Kennedy and Joseph E. Stiglitz (Oxford University Press, 2013)
- The Economic Development of Latin America Since Independence edited by Luis Bertola and José Antonio Ocampo (Oxford University Press, 2012)
- Development Cooperation in Times of Crisis edited by José Antonio Ocampo and José Antonio Alonso (Columbia University Press, 2012)
- Good Growth and Governance in Africa: Rethinking Development Strategies edited by Akbar Noman, Kwesi Botchwey, Howard Stein, and Joseph E. Stiglitz (Oxford University Press, 2011)
- Reforming the International Financial System for Development edited by Jomo Kwame Sundaram (Columbia University Press, 2011)
- Taxation in Developing Countries: Six Case Studies and Policy Implications edited by Roger Gordon (Columbia University Press, 2010)
- Overcoming Developing Country Debt Crises edited by Barry Herman, José Antonio Ocampo, Shari Spiegel (Oxford University Press, 2010)
- Debates on the Measurement of Global Poverty edited by Sudhir Anand, Paul Segal, and Joseph E. Stiglitz (Oxford University Press, 2010)
- Time for a Visible Hand: Lessons from the 2008 World Financial Crisis edited by Stephany Griffith Jones, José Antonio Ocampo, and Joseph E. Stiglitz (Oxford University Press, 2010)
- Growth and Policy in Developing Countries: A Structuralist Approach by José Antonio Ocampo, Codrina Rada, and Lance Taylor (Columbia University Press, 2009)
- Industrial Policy and Development: The Political Economy of Capabilities Accumulation edited by Mario Cimoli, Giovanni Dosi, and Joseph E. Stiglitz
- Privatization: Successes and Failures edited by Gérard Roland and Joseph E. Stiglitz (Columbia University Press, 2008)
- Capital Market Liberalization and Development edited by Joseph E. Stiglitz and José Antonio Ocampo (Oxford University Press, 2008)
- The Washington Consensus Reconsidered edited by Narcis Serra and Joseph Stiglitz (Oxford University Press, 2008)
- Escaping the Resource Curse edited by Macartan Humphreys, Jeffrey D. Sachs, and Joseph E. Stiglitz (Columbia University Press, 2007)
- The Right to Know: Transparency for an Open World edited by Ann Florini (Columbia University Press, 2007)
- Covering Labor: A Reporter’s Guide to Workers’ Rights in a Global Economy by Anya Schiffrin (Vanguard Books, 2006)
- Stability with Growth: Macroeconomics, Liberalization and Development by Joseph E. Stiglitz, José Antonio Ocampo, Shari Spiegel, Ricardo Ffrench-Davis, and Deepak Nayyar (Oxford University Press, 2006)
- Economic Development and Environmental Sustainability: New Policy Options edited by Ramón López and Michael A. Toman (Oxford University Press, 2006)
- Fair Trade for All: How Trade Can Promote Development by Joseph Stiglitz and Andrew Charlton (Oxford University Press, 2006)
