= Barcelona Centre for International Affairs =

Spanish think tank

Coordinates: 41°22′59″N 2°10′5″E

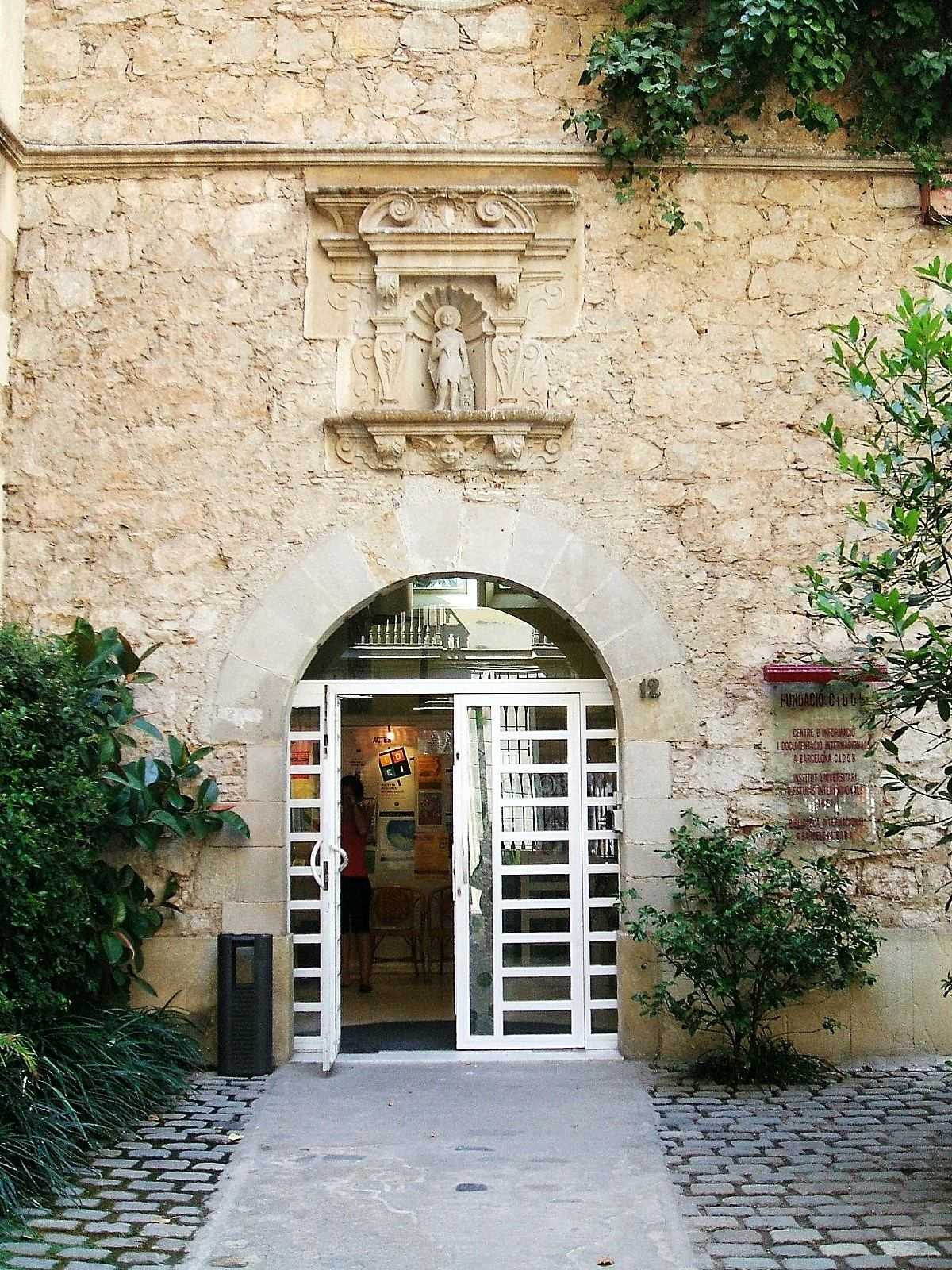
- Head office of CIDOB in Barcelona
- Abbreviation: CIDOB
- Formation: 1973
- Type: Private foundation, think tank
- Headquarters: Elisabets 12, 08001
- Location: Barcelona, Spain
- Director: Pol Morillas i Bassedas
- President: Josep Borrell
- Website: cidob.org

The Barcelona Centre for International Affairs (CIDOB) is a Spanish think tank headquartered in Barcelona, devoted to research in the field of international relations. It defines itself as an "independent institution" that studies specifically "global issues that affect governance at different levels, from international to local". Legally, CIDOB is a private foundation endowed with a board of trustees made up of the main public institutions and universities of Barcelona and Catalonia. Both the centre and the foundation are governed by statutes, a code of ethics, and a master plan. At present, CIDOB is the oldest think tank in Spain and one of the most influential in its area, at the European level.

== Name and acronym ==
The centre's original name was, from 1973 onwards, Centre d'Informació i Documentació Internacionals a Barcelona (Barcelona Centre for International Information and Documentation), thus giving rise to the acronym CIDOB. Later on, the centre was referred to using other names, such as Centro de Relaciones Internacionales y Cooperación Internacional (Centre of International Relations and International Cooperation), Centro de Investigación de Relaciones Internacionales y Desarrollo (Research Centre on International Relations and Development), and Centro de Estudios y Documentación Internacionales de Barcelona (Barcelona Centre for International Studies and Documentation).

Since 2013, the official name, in all cases and without translations, uses the English form Barcelona Centre for International Affairs.

== History ==
CIDOB was founded in 1973 as a nonprofit, socio-cultural association based on the personal experience of its founder, Josep Ribera i Pinyol (1933–2017). Ribera was one of the promoters of the Catalan inter-diocesan movement Agermanament (Brothering), which was active in cooperation projects with countries in Africa and Latin America. This original CIDOB was known as CIDOB Tercer Mundo (CIDOB Third World) or CIDOB-TM. In 1979, as a result of the political transformations taking place in Catalonia and Spain, CIDOB was legally constituted as a private foundation with a board of trustees, whose members, public and private, represented the political and cultural life of Catalonia and Spain.

In the following years, CIDOB grew to become a research and documentation centre focused on international affairs and global issues, such as human development and migration. Since the 1990s, the centre has strengthened its networking connections with European initiatives on issues concerning cooperation, international relations, and security, as well as its academic activities, which are aimed to generate ideas and specific political action.

Ribera continued to head CIDOB until December 2008, when he chose to step down after 35 years at the helm. His successor as director was, by decision of the foundation's board of trustees, Jordi Vaquer i Fanés. Narcís Serra i Serra, former mayor of Barcelona, previous minister in the Spanish Government, and one-time leader of the Catalan Socialists, chaired the foundation from 2000 to May 2012, when he was succeeded by economist Carles A. Gasòliba i Böhm.

In March 2010, Javier Solana Madariaga, formerly the EU's High Representative for the Common Foreign and Security Policy, was appointed honorary chairman of CIDOB, a newly created post outside the organisational structure. In December 2012, Vaquer, newly appointed head of the new Open Society Initiative for Europe (OSIFE), stepped down as director. In June 2013, the board of trustees selected a new director, economics professor Jordi Bacaria i Colom, who is currently co-director of the Institute of European Integration Studies (IEIE) in Mexico and editor of the journal Foreign Affairs Latinoamérica.

CIDOB's current president, since January 2017, is Antoni Segura i Mas, Professor of Contemporary History at the University of Barcelona. Since September 2018, CIDOB has been directed by Pol Morillas, CIDOB's Research Deputy Director up to that date.

=== CIDOB leadership ===
- President	Term
  Narcís Serra	2000–2012
  Carles Gasòliba	2012–2016
  Josep Joan Moreso	2016–2017
  Antoni Segura	2017–2025
  Josep Borrell	2025–present
- Director	Term
  Josep Ribera	1973–2008
  Jordi Vaquer	2008–2012
  Jordi Bacaria	2013–2018
  Pol Morillas	2018–present

== Organisation and properties ==
=== Management and staff ===
As of December 2021, CIDOB's management team is made up of Antoni Segura (president), Pol Morillas (director), Anna Estrada (executive coordinator), and María José Rodríguez (head of economic and financial management and administration). The workforce is completed with a team of researchers, project managers, area officers, and coordinators (projects, publications, information, communication, and press), in addition to the administration and general services staff. A network of associate researchers collaborates with the centre.

=== Board of trustees ===
The foundation's board is made up of both institutional and individual trustees, whose financial contributions represent most of the centre's annual budget. The institutional trustees are:

- Generalitat of Catalonia
- City Council of Barcelona
- Provincial Deputation of Barcelona
- Barcelona metropolitan area
- Spanish Ministry of Foreign Affairs, European Union and Cooperation
- Inter-university Council of Catalonia

=== Consulting committees ===
In addition, a scientific committee and an economic committee assist the centre in formulating its policy guidelines.

=== Funding ===
According to the centre's website, CIDOB approved in 2020 a balanced budget for 2021, with both incomes and expenses equalling €2.68 million. The trustees' contribution (structural funding) amounts to 54%, while funding for participation in EU-sponsored projects or other ownership accounts for 41%. CIDOB has received international funding from institutions such as UNDP, Union for the Mediterranean, EU-LAC Foundation, Open Society Foundations, Stiftung Mercator, OCP Foundation, Friedrich Ebert Stiftung, and Bertelsmann Stiftung, as well as private funders such as Fundación Bancaria La Caixa.

=== Properties ===
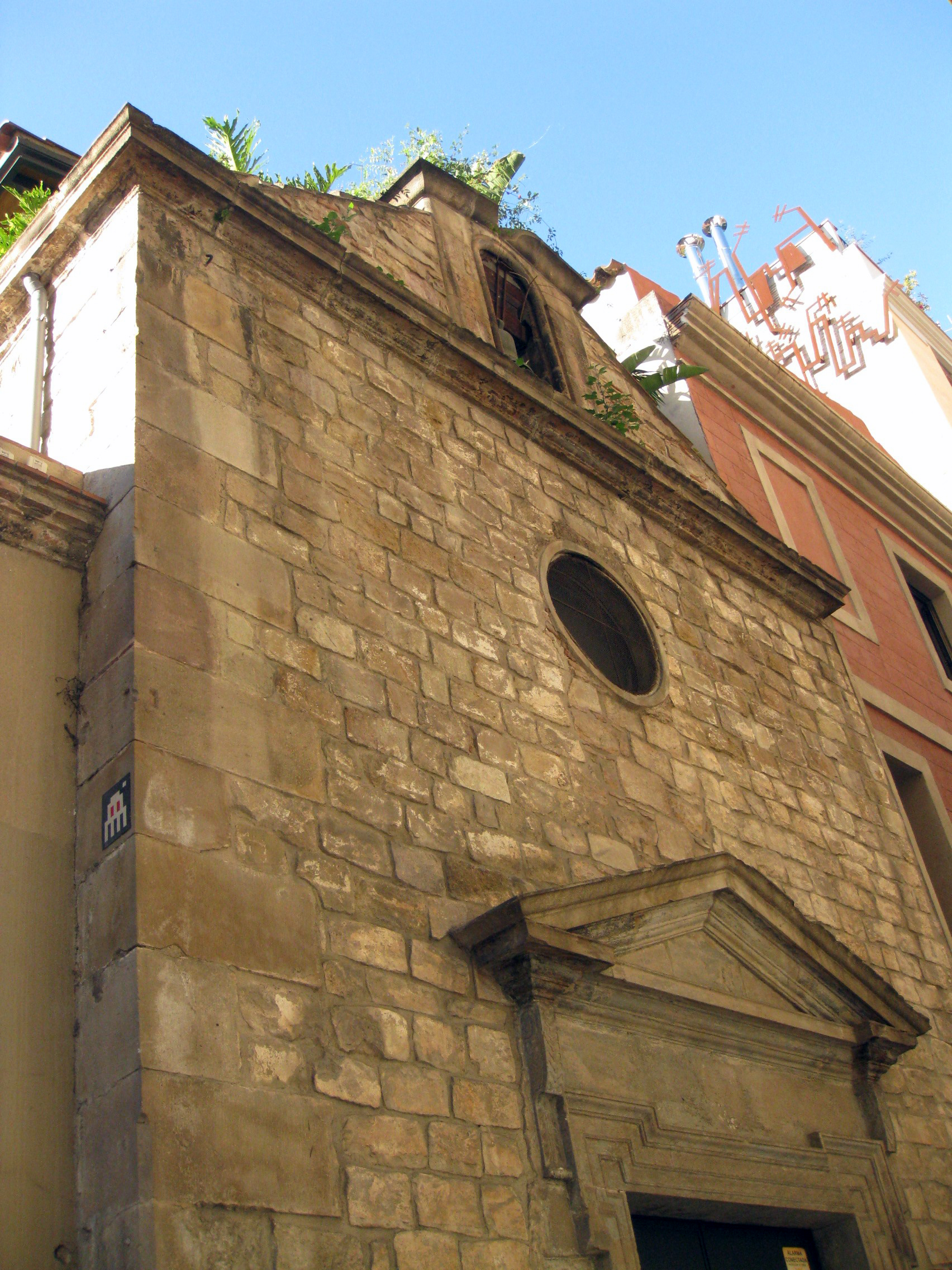
Casa dels Infants Orfes

For years, CIDOB's offices were divided between two historic buildings—nearby but not adjoining—on calle Elisabets in Barcelona's Raval district, very close to La Rambla and Plaça de Catalunya: Casa de la Misericòrdia (Elisabets, 12) and Casa dels Infants Orfes (Elisabets, 24).

The Casa de la Misericòrdia houses the centre's main offices, including the official head office, archives, and library, as well as Sala Maragall, the hall used for events. Originally, the building, which includes the old church, formed part of the School of St William of Aquitaine, founded by the Augustine Order in 1587, and later on it was used as a municipal primary school. During the Napoleonic invasion, the house was used as a secret headquarters by the local resistance against French occupation. In 1910, it became the seat of the Institute of Culture and People's Library for Women; later still, in 1940, the building hosted the Institute for Theatre, as well as being home to the Adrià Gual Chair. It began being used by CIDOB in 1988.

The Casa dels Infants Orfes also dates back to the 16th century. It was built as the seat of the institution founded by Guillem dez Pou in 1370 to provide a foster home for orphans in the Diocese of Barcelona. It has an adjacent chapel, commissioned by Claudi Cosal in 1680 and redesigned in 1785. Among the building's later uses, it was a school run by the Daughters of Charity of Saint Vincent de Paul (1848) and a convent for the Carmelites of Charity (1875). The chapel lost all its religious furnishings and fittings during the Spanish Civil War. Currently, the Open Society Initiative for Europe (OSIFE, European chapter of the Open Society Foundations) is headquartered at this house.

== Activities ==
=== Research areas ===
In its Revised Master Plan of 2019–2021, where it introduces itself as a "global thought centre", CIDOB sets out eight strategic lines of research, both thematic and geographic:

- Thematic areas
  Global geopolitics and security
  Migration
  Global cities and metropolises
  Sustainable development
- Geographic areas
  Europe
  The Great Mediterranean
  Latin America and the Atlantic Area
  Asia-Pacific and Sub-Saharan Africa

Every research area is run by a team of researchers, who work with other analysts, assistants, associates, or visiting experts, as well as external collaborators.

=== Events ===
Every year since 2002, CIDOB and the City Council of Barcelona jointly hold the international seminar War and Peace in the 21st Century, a series of debates attended by leading international scholars and other senior officers from public service and government politics. For the 2021 edition, due to the COVID-19 pandemic, the seminar was reformulated as a documentary named Bouncing Back. World Politics After the Pandemic, focused on the impact of the pandemic on scenarios of conflict and cooperation.

=== Collaboration projects ===
CIDOB has partnered with other think tanks and institutions in a number of networked academic and research projects. Some of these projects and programs, mostly funded by the European Commission, provide a significant part of its budget accounts.

=== Teaching and IBEI ===
In 1989, CIDOB began providing training programmes for university postgraduate students, in collaboration with the Autonomous University of Barcelona.

In 2004, CIDOB transferred its teaching activities to the newly founded Institut Barcelona d'Estudis Internacionals (Barcelona Institute for International Studies).

== Social influence ==
The 2010 edition of Global Go-to Think Tanks—a list of think tanks from around the world issued by the international relations program of the University of Pennsylvania—assessed 4,567 centres from around the world and ranked CIDOB 37th out of the 50 best non-US think tanks, in the category Top 50 Think Tanks – Worldwide (Non-US). In this list, the Barcelona centre was the only Spanish think tank and the third from southern Europe, behind two French institutions. In the 2015 edition, CIDOB placed 58th out of 175 in the Top Think Tanks Worldwide (U.S. and Non-U.S.) category, 28th out of 137 in the Top Think Tanks Worldwide (Non-US) and 16th out of 129 in the Top Think Tanks in Western Europe.

In the 2020 edition, CIDOB was listed as follows: 29th out of 154 in the Top Think Tanks Worldwide (Non-US); 36th out of 174 in the Top Think Tanks Worldwide (US and Non-US); 12th out of 142 in the Top Think Tanks in Western Europe; 67th out of 110 in the Top Defense and National Security Think Tanks; 64th out of 156 in the Top Foreign Policy and International Affairs Think Tanks; 55th out of 86 in the Best Think Tank Network; 3rd out of 109 in the Think Tanks to Watch in 2021; 8th out of 143 in the Best Independent Think Tanks; and 63rd out of 75 in the Best Quality Assurance and Integrity Policies and Procedures.
