= Hiroyasu Shoji =

Japanese lighting designer

- 東海林 弘靖
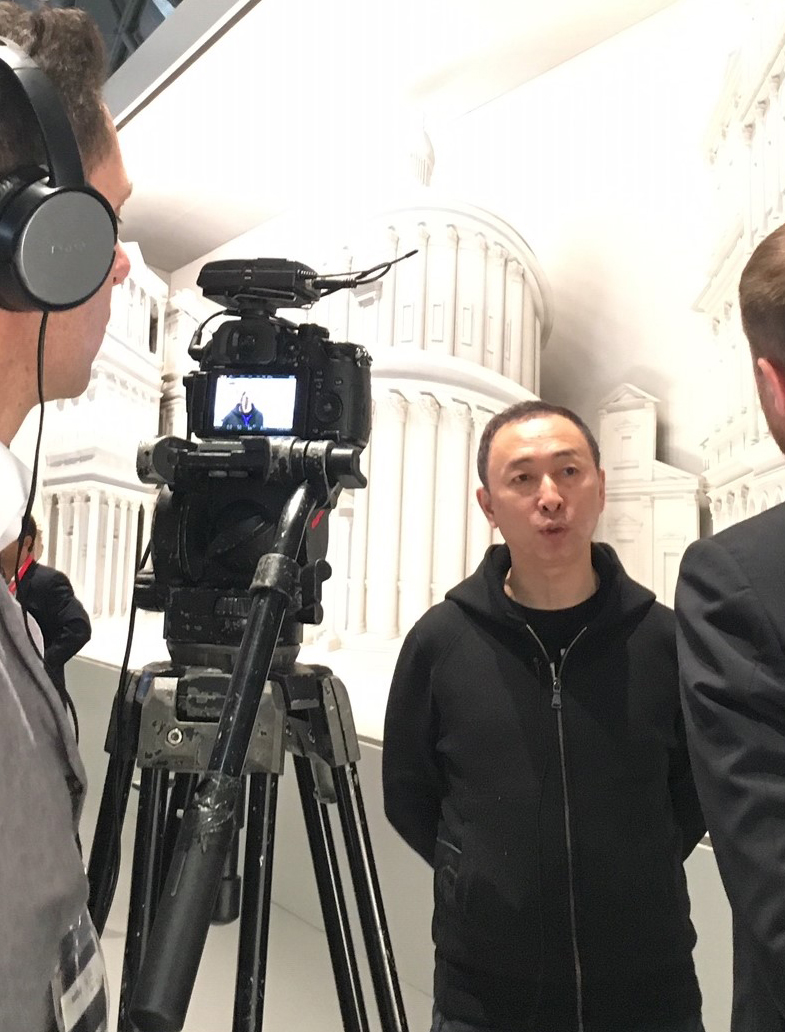
- Frankfurt am Main 2016
- Born: 1958 (age 67–68); Fukushima
- Education: Kogakuin University
- Occupation: Lighting designer
- Organization: Lightdesign Inc.
- Website: www.lightdesign.jp

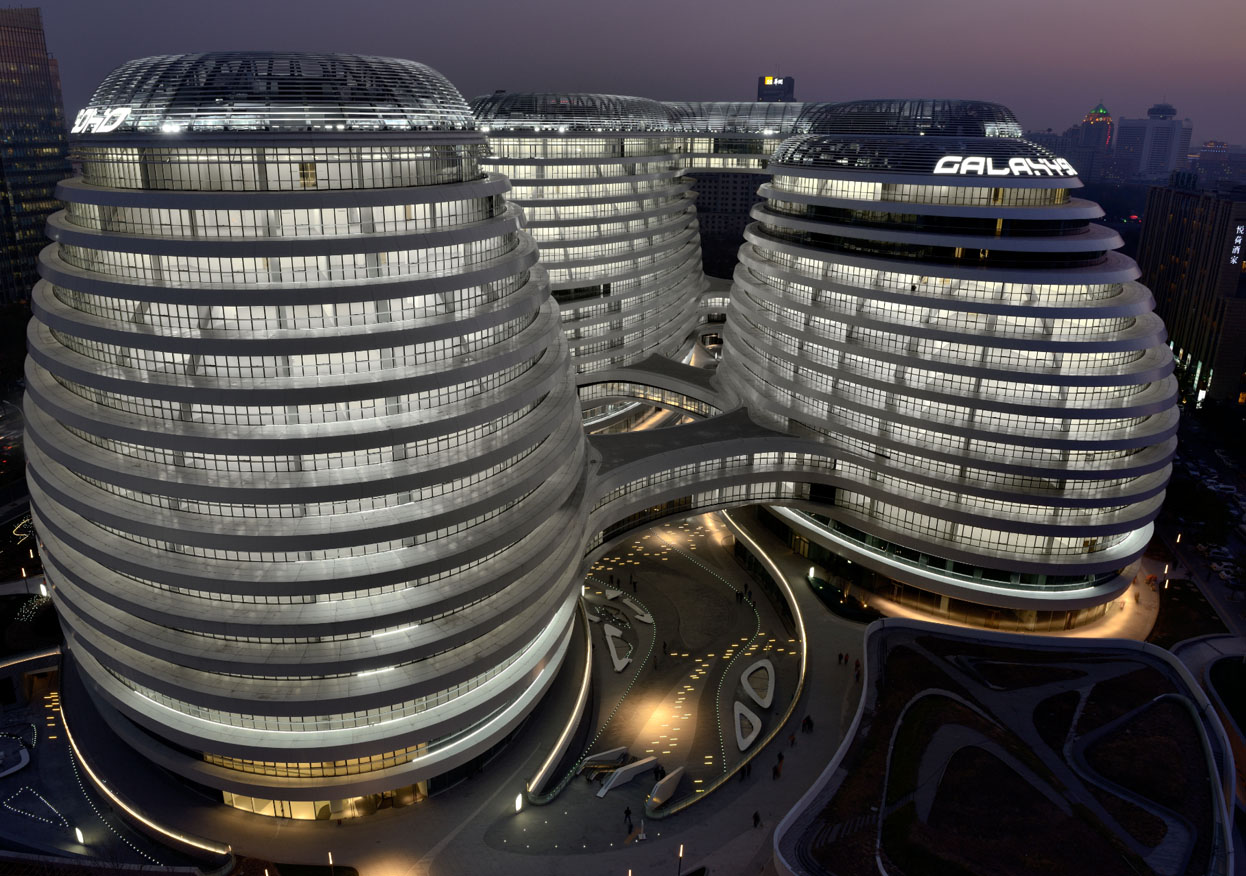
Galaxy SOHO

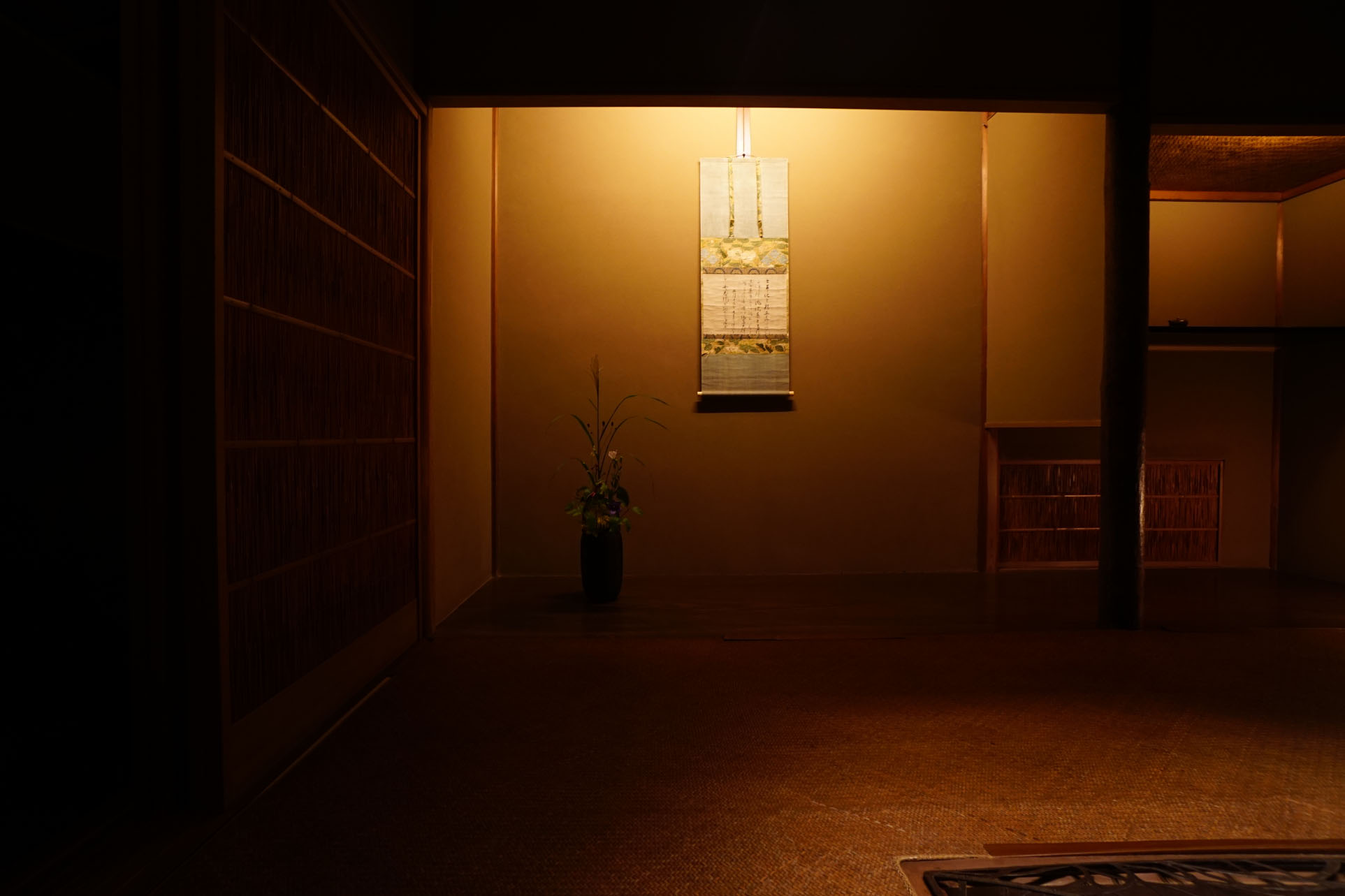
Kodaiji Wakuden

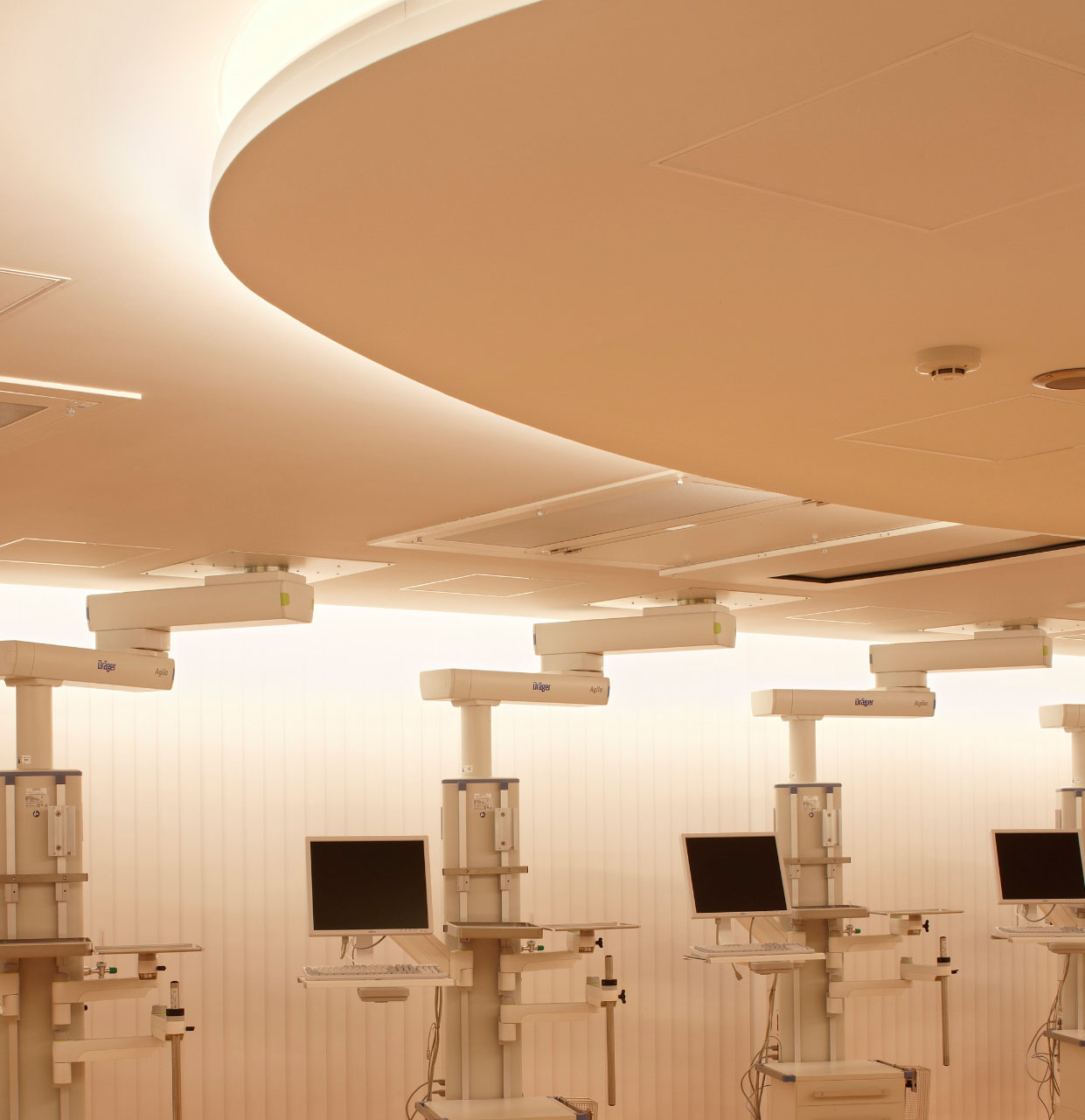
Nagoya Daini Red Cross Hospital NICU+

Hiroyasu Shoji (東海林 弘靖, born 1958) is a Japanese lighting designer.

Hiroyasu Shoji is the president of Lightdesign Inc., located in Ginza, Tokyo. He began serving as the director of the Japanese International Lighting Designers Association when it was founded.

== Career ==
Hiroyasu Shoji founded the lighting design studio Lightdesign Inc. in 2000. He has worked with architects including Zaha Hadid, Fumihiko Maki, Toyo Ito, Sou Fujimoto. He has focused on lighting design since 2011.

== Inspiration ==
He was inspired to focus his work on lighting due to the blackout following the Fukushima earthquake in 2011 and by a visit to Papua New Guinea which had no electricity at the time.

== Projects and awards ==
PJ Name	Date	Architects	Location	Lighting design award
Za-Koenji	2008	Toyo Ito & Associates, Architects	Tokyo, Japan	International Association of Lighting Designer - Special Citation
Shimizu Performing Arts Center	2012	Maki and Associates + Taisei Corporation Project Consortium	Shizuoka, Japan	Illuminating Engineering Society of North America - Award of Merit
Galaxy SOHO	2012	Zaha Hadid Architects	Beijing, China	Illuminating Engineering Society of North America - Award of Merit
Nagoya Daini Red Cross Hospital NICU	2013	Yamashita Sekkei INC.	Aichi, Japan	International Association of Lighting Designer - Special Citation
Wangjing SOHO	2014	Zaha Hadid Architects	Beijing, China	Illuminating Engineering Society of North America - Award of Merit
Sky SOHO	2014	Zaha Hadid Architects	Shanghai, China	Illuminating Engineering Society of North America - Award of Merit
Futako-Tamagawa Rise	2015	Design Supervision: Conran Partners [II-a Area]: Nikken Sekkei LTD, RIA, Tokyu Architects& Engineers INC. [I-a.b, II-b, III Area]: RIA, Tokyu Architects& Engineers INC.	Tokyo, Japan	International Association of Lighting Designer - Award of Excellence
Tokyu Plaza Ginza	2016	Nikken Sekkei	Tokyo, Japan	Illuminating Engineering Society of North America - Award of Merit
Sea World Culture and Arts Center	2017	Maki and Associates	Shenzhen, China	Illuminating Engineering Society of North America - Award of Merit
Yakushi-ji Temple -Jikido Hall	2017	Toyo Ito & Associates, Architects	Nara, Japan	Illuminating Engineering Society of North America - Award of Merit
'Meguri no Mori' Kawaguchi City Funeral Hall	2018	Toyo Ito & Associates, Architects	Saitama, Japan	Illuminating Engineering Society of North America - Award of Merit
