= Leeza SOHO =

Skyscraper in Beijing, China

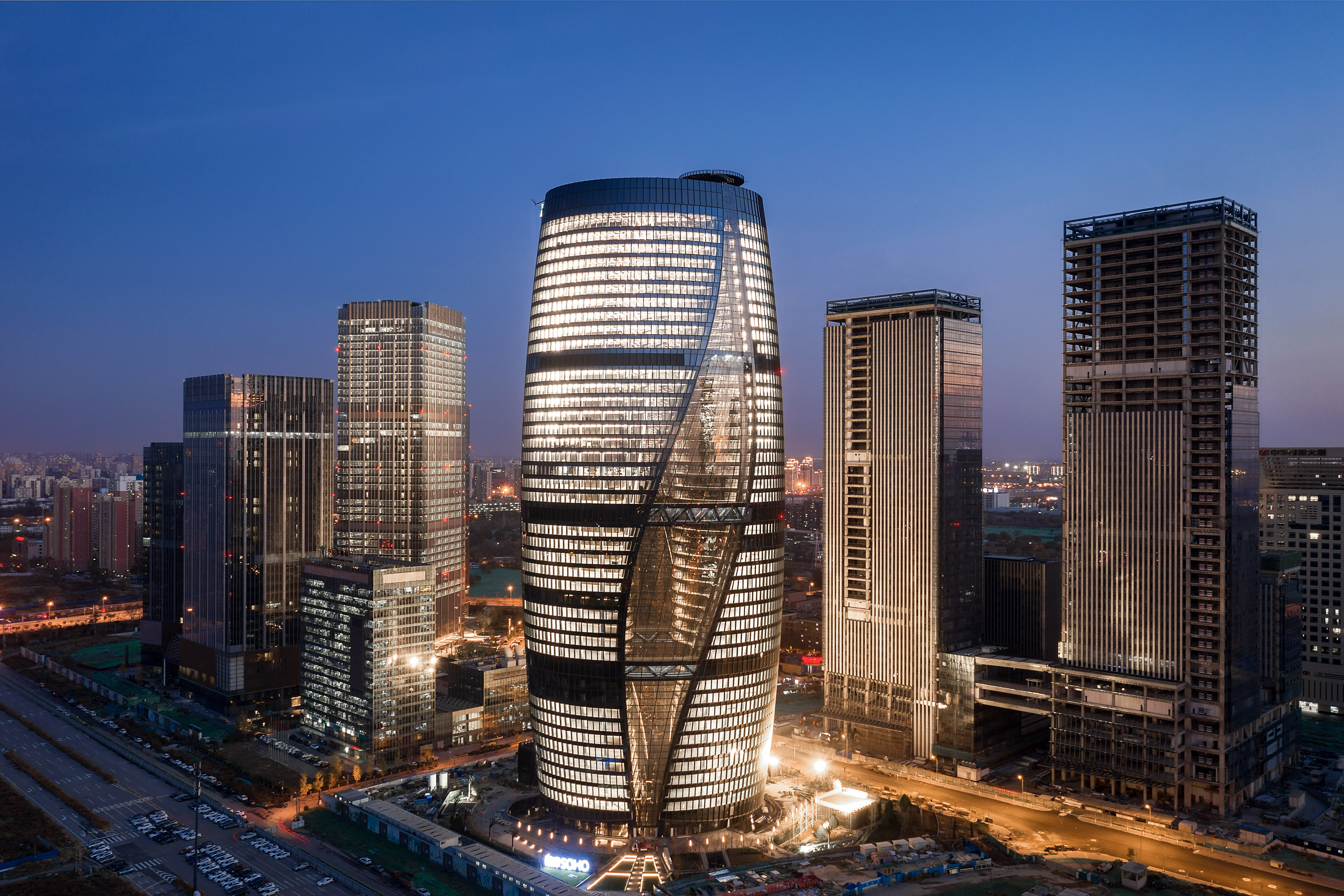
- Interactive map of the Leeza SOHO area
- Alternative names: SOHO Li Ze Tower

General information
- Status: Completed
- Type: Office
- Location: Beijing, China
- Coordinates: 39.865556°N 116.324167°E
- Construction started: 2015
- Topped-out: September 2017
- Opening: 19 November 2019

Height
- Roof: 207 m (679 ft)

Technical details
- Floor count: 46 (+4 underground)
- Floor area: 172,800 m^{2} (1,860,000 sq ft)

Design and construction
- Architects: Zaha Hadid, Patrik Schumacher
- Architecture firm: Zaha Hadid Architects
- Structural engineer: Bollinger + Grohmann
- Main contractor: China State Construction Engineering Corp

Leeza SOHO (Chinese: 丽泽SOHO; pinyin: Lìzé SOHO), also known as Li Ze Tower, is a 207 m (679 ft) tall commercial skyscraper located in the Lize Financial Business District in Beijing, China. SOHO China acquired land use rights in 2013 for ¥1.922 billion RMB (US$288 million). The construction of the building began in 2015 and it was opened on 19 November 2019, making it the third of three buildings designed by Zaha Hadid Architects and developed by SOHO China, along with Galaxy SOHO and Wangjing SOHO.

== Notable features ==
=== Atrium ===
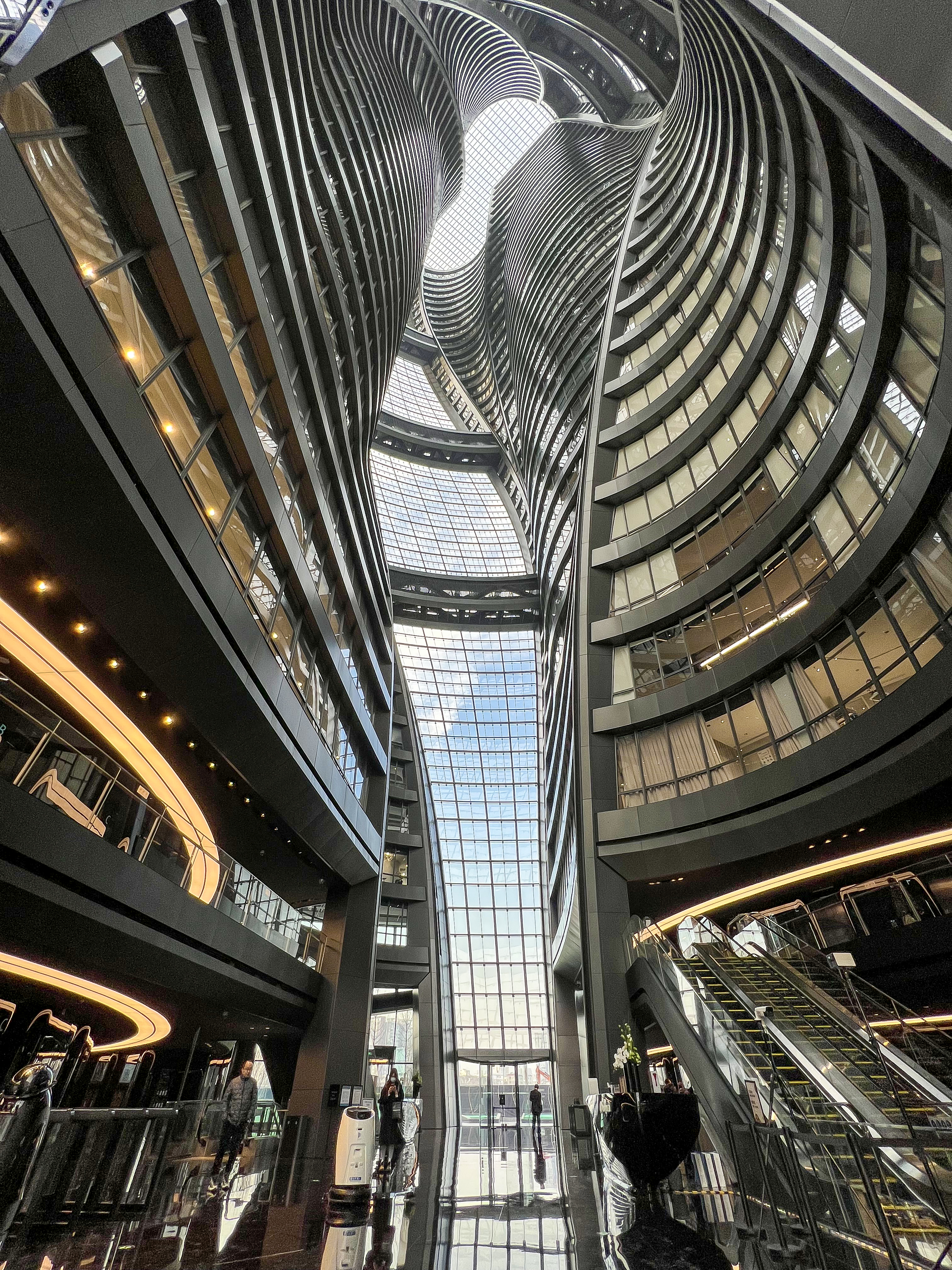
Central atrium

The Leeza SOHO features a 194-metre (636 ft) tall twisting atrium at its centre, which is the tallest in the world, a title previously held by the Burj Al Arab hotel in Dubai. The atrium twists 45° over the height of the building to allow natural light to all floors. Structural rings at each level, four sky bridges, and a double-insulated glass façade unite the two halves of the tower together.

=== Subway connection ===
Leeza SOHO is located at the intersection of Line 14 and Line 16 of the Beijing Subway network, served by Lize Shangwuqu station, with one exit directly leading to the building's atrium and numerous others surrounding it. In 2026, a Daxing Airport Express platform will open at the station, with plans for Line 11 and Line 25 (Fangshan Line) to also be extended there in the near future.

== See also ==
- Galaxy SOHO
- Wangjing SOHO
- Zaha Hadid Architects
