= Galaxy SOHO =

- 银河 SOHO; Yínhé SOHO
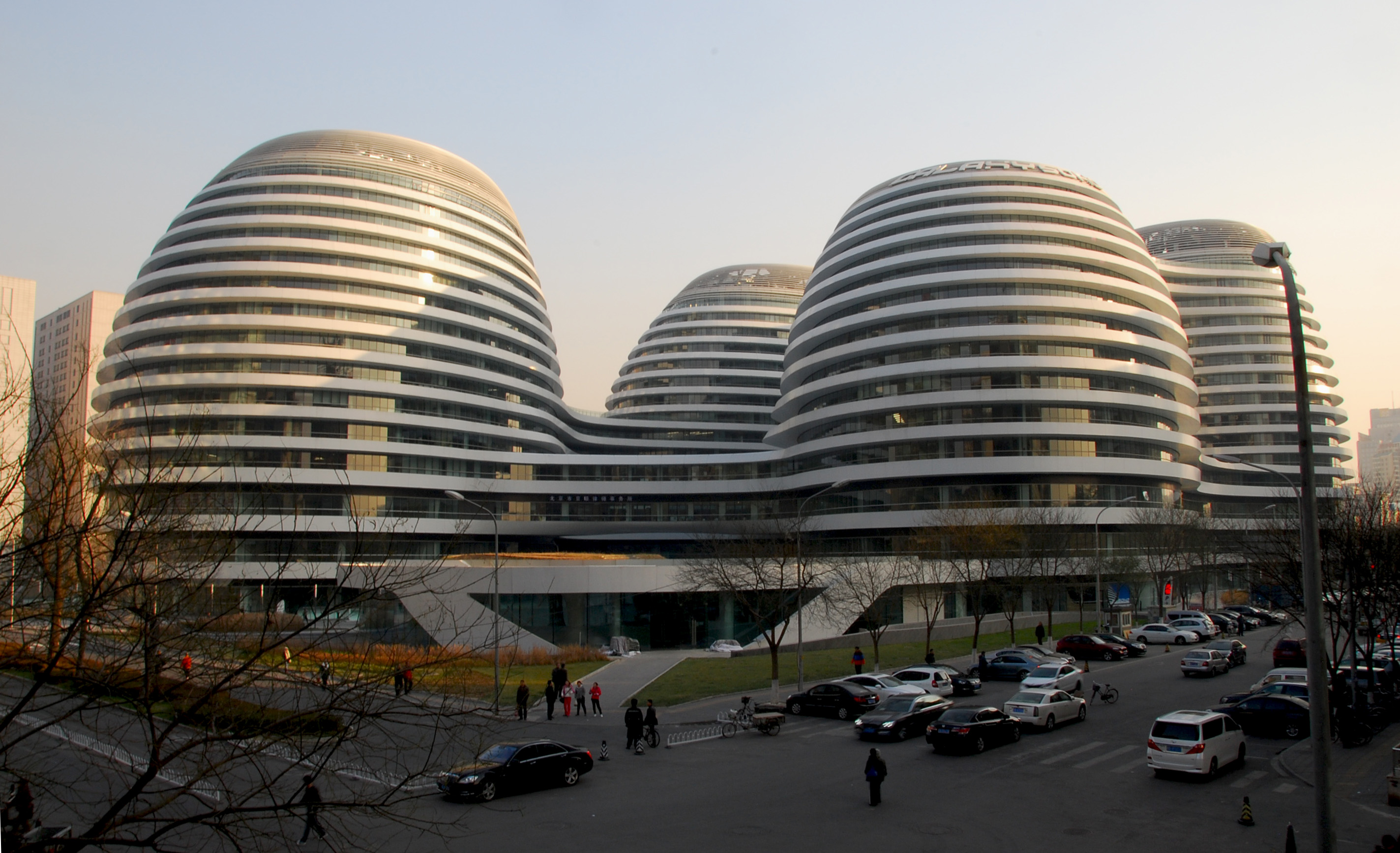
- Galaxy SOHO exterior
- Interactive map of the Galaxy SOHO area

General information
- Status: Completed
- Architectural style: Retrofuturism
- Location: Beijing, China, Chaoyangmen, Dongcheng District, Beijing, China 100006
- Coordinates: 39°55′10″N 116°25′37″E
- Construction started: 2009
- Completed: 2012
- Owner: SOHO China Ltd.

Height
- Height: 67 m

Technical details
- Floor count: 18

Design and construction
- Architect: Zaha Hadid
- Architecture firm: Zaha Hadid Architects

Other information
- Parking: 1275

Galaxy SOHO (simplified Chinese: 银河SOHO; traditional Chinese: 銀河SOHO; pinyin: Yínhé SOHO) is an urban complex building located in Beijing, China. Built between 2009 and 2012, it is the first of three buildings designed by Iraqi-British architect Zaha Hadid located in Beijing, along with Wangjing SOHO and Leeza SOHO.

The building is located in the southwest corner of Chaoyangmen Bridge in the Second Ring Road of Beijing. The complex features a curvilinear design consisting of four asymmetric continuous structures. It covers an area of 330,000 m^{2}. The parametric design of the building was inspired by classical Chinese courtyards. The complex offers shops, offices and entertainment facilities.

== Design ==
The Galaxy Soho building comprises four main domed structures, fused together by bridges and platforms between curving floor plates to create a fluid environment that surrounds a series of public courtyards and a larger central "canyon." Zaha Hadid described the structure as "a reinventing of the classical Chinese courtyard which generates an immersive, enveloping experience at the Heart of Beijing." According to Zaha Hadid, the design is meant to "respond to the varied contextual relationships and dynamic conditions of Beijing." The exterior of the building is clad in aluminium and stone while the interior features glass, terrazzo, stainless steel and glass reinforced gypsum. The complex incorporates a cooled roofing system that minimizes the effects of microclimates caused by sustainable architectural strategies.

There are 18 floors in total. The lower three levels of Galaxy SOHO house public facilities for retail and entertainment. The levels immediately above, from the fourth floor to the fifteenth, provide office spaces for businesses. The top three levels are dedicated to bars, restaurants and cafes that offer views along Beijing.

In 2013, Galaxy SOHO was nominated for the Lubetkin Prize by the Royal Institute of British Architects. The nomination drew criticism from the Beijing Cultural Heritage Protection Centre, which stated that the development had "caused great damage to the preservation of the old Beijing streetscape, the original urban plan, the traditional hutong and courtyard houses, the landscape formation, and the style and colour scheme of Beijing's unique vernacular architecture."

== See also ==
- Leeza SOHO
- SOHO China
- Wangjing SOHO
