= Atrium (architecture) =

Open-air or naturally-lit large space surrounded by a building

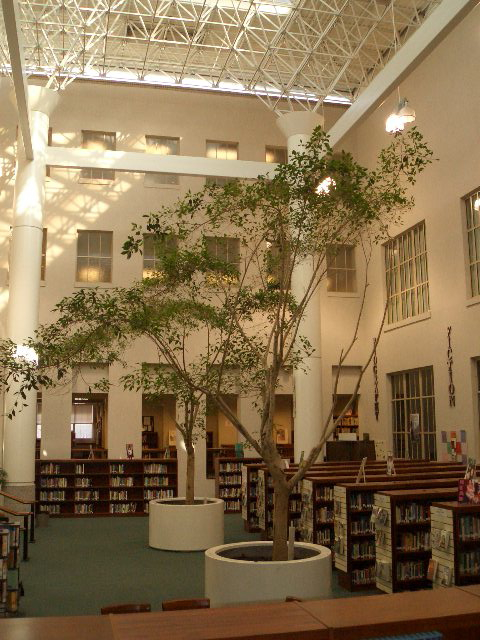
The Tucson High School Galleria and reflexive library (pictured) feature a modern atrium tetrastylum with four support columns and open roof

In architecture, an atrium (pl.: atria or atriums) is a large open-air or skylight-covered space surrounded by a building. Atria were a common feature in Ancient Roman dwellings, providing light and ventilation to the interior. Modern atria, as developed in the late 19th and 20th centuries, are often several stories high, with a glazed roof or large windows, and often located immediately beyond a building's main entrance doors (in the lobby).

Atria are a popular design feature because they give their buildings a "feeling of space and light." The atrium has become a key feature of many buildings in recent years. Atria are popular with building users, building designers and building developers. Users like atria because they create a dynamic and stimulating interior that provides shelter from the external environment while maintaining a visual link with that environment. Designers enjoy the opportunity to create new types of spaces in buildings, and developers see atria as prestigious amenities that can increase commercial value and appeal.

== Ancient atria ==
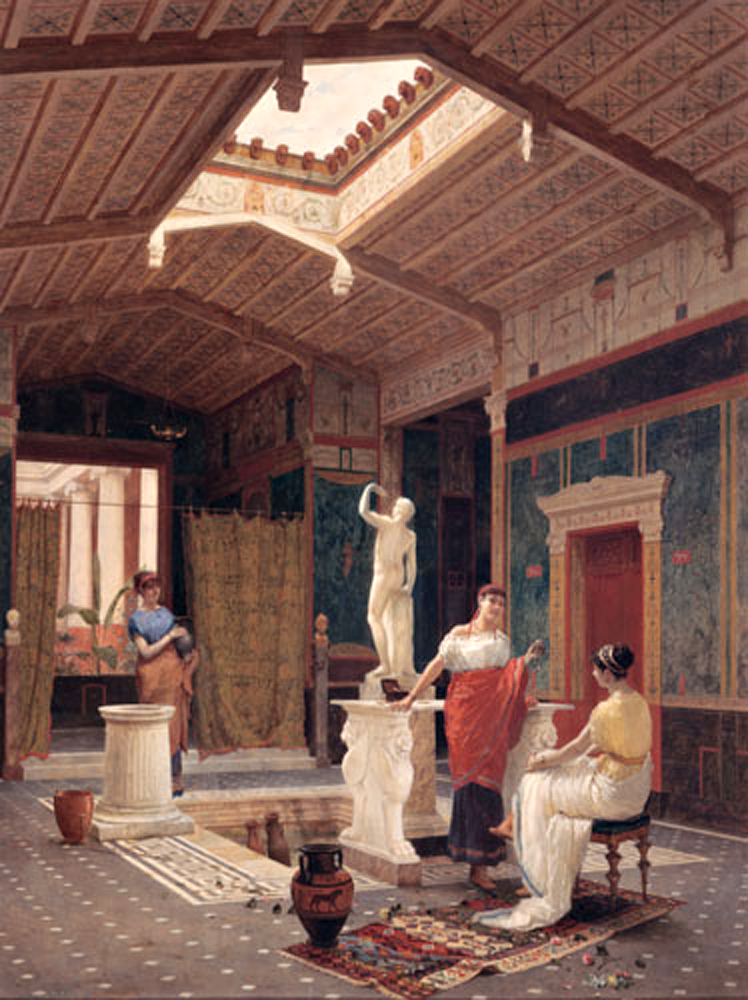
A late 19th-century artist's reimagining of an atrium in a Pompeian domus

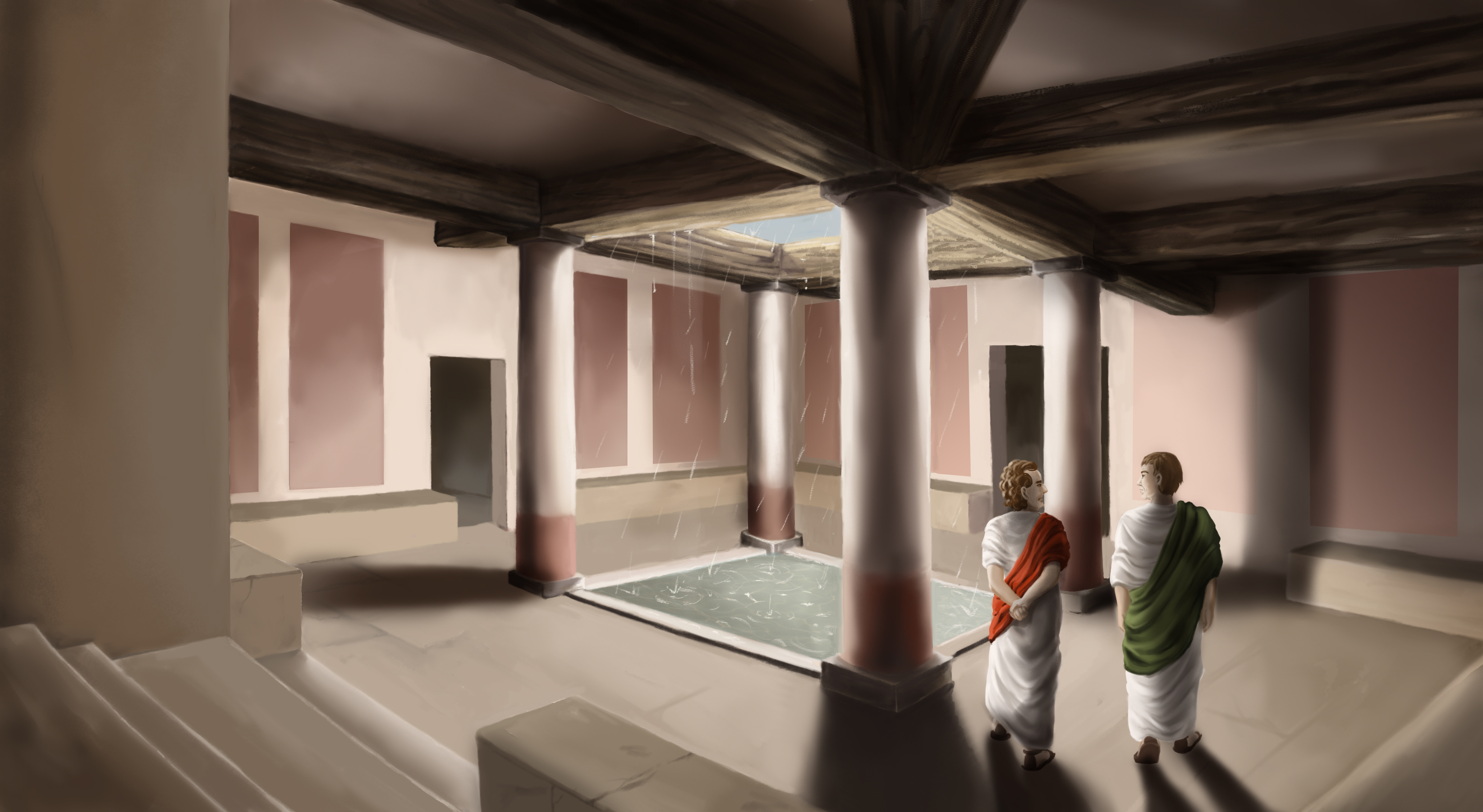
Illustration of the atrium in the building of the baths in the Roman villa of "Els Munts", close to Tarraco

In a domus, a large house in ancient Roman architecture, the atrium was the open central court with enclosed rooms on all sides. In the middle of the atrium was the impluvium, a shallow pool sunken into the floor to catch rainwater from the roof. Some surviving examples are beautifully decorated. The opening in the ceiling above the pool (compluvium) called for some means of support for the roof, and it is here where one differentiates between five different styles of atrium. As the centrepiece of the house, the atrium was the most lavishly furnished room. Wealthier houses often included a marble cartibulum, an oblong marble table supported by trapezophoros pedestals depicting mythological creatures like winged griffins. Also, it contained the little chapel to the ancestral spirits (lararium), the household safe (arca) and sometimes a bust of the master of the house. The cylindrical puteal (a wellhead) gave access to the water cistern fed by water seeping through the porous bottom of the overlying impluvium. The atrium contributed to the passive cooling of the house.

The term was also used for a variety of spaces in public and religious buildings, mostly forms of arcaded courtyards, larger versions of the domestic spaces. Byzantine churches were often entered through such a space (as are many mosques, though the term atrium is not usually used to describe Islamic architecture).

== 19th century: Glazed atrium ==
The 19th century brought the industrial revolution with great advances in iron and glass manufacturing techniques. Courtyards could then have horizontal glazing overhead, eliminating some of the weather elements from the space and giving birth to the modern atrium.

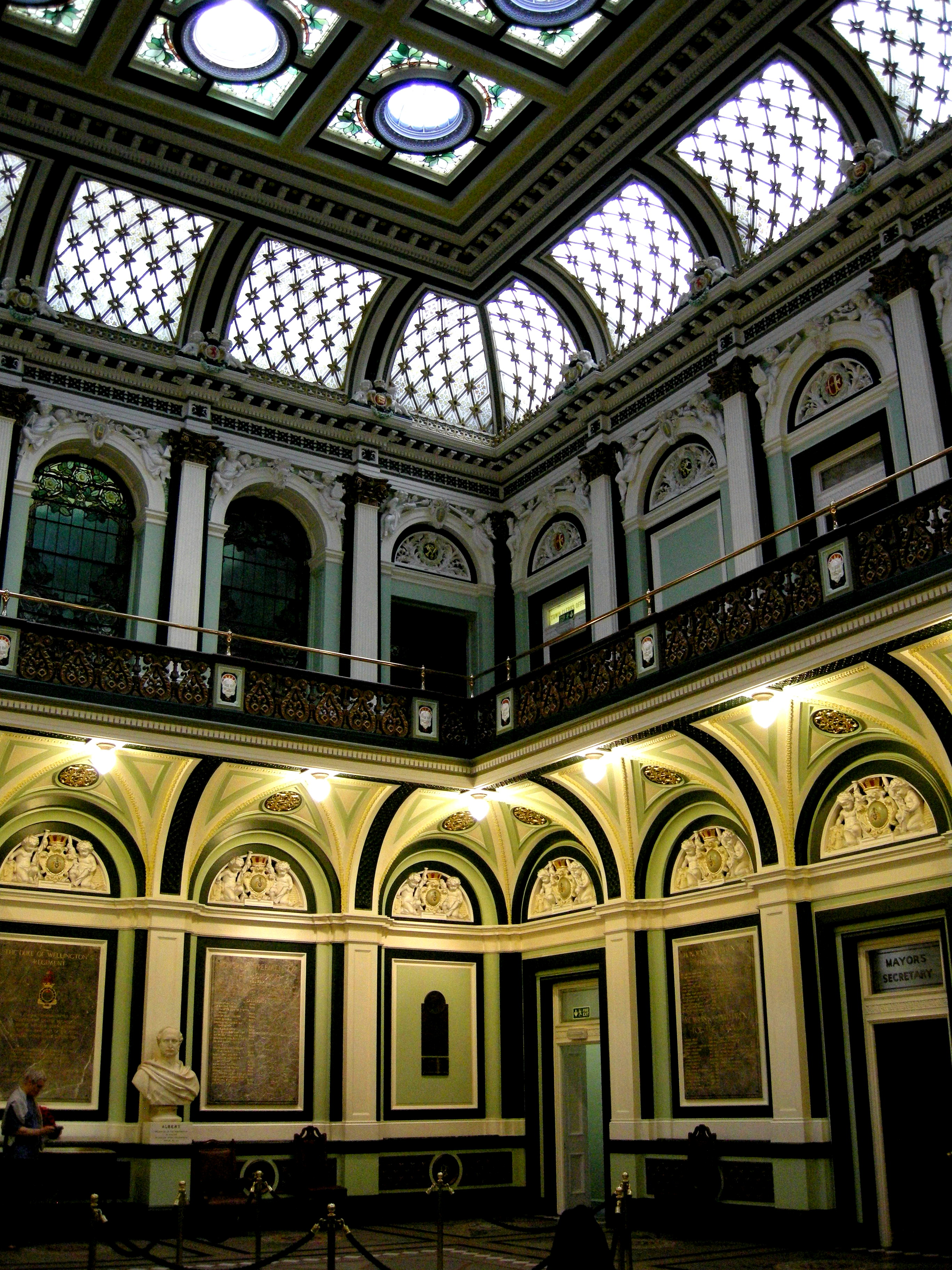
Victoria Hall in Halifax Town Hall, 1863

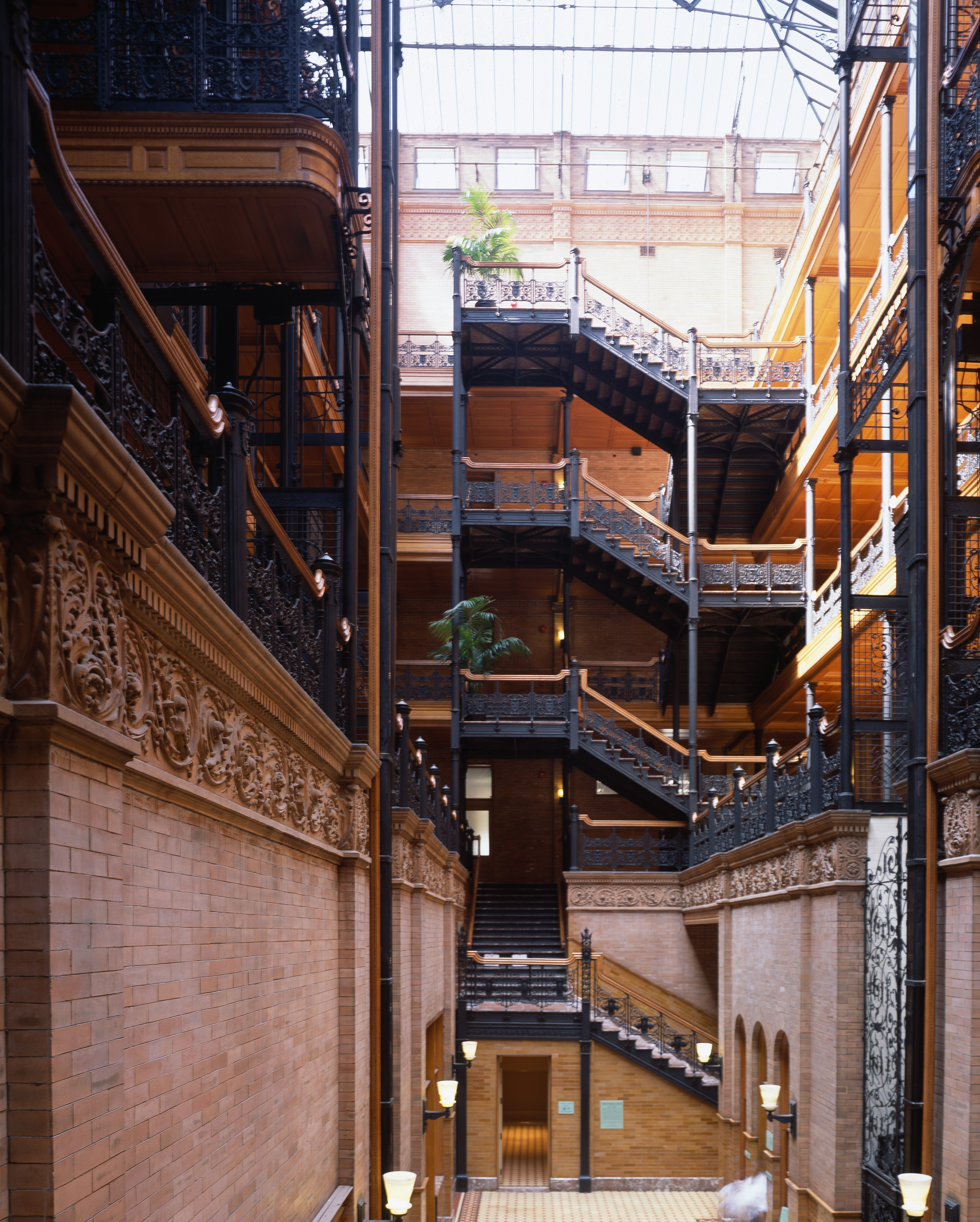
Atrium at the center of the Bradbury Building in Los Angeles

== Modern-day atria ==
Fire control is an important aspect of contemporary atrium design due to criticism that poorly designed atria could allow fire to spread to a building's upper stories more quickly. Another downside to incorporating an atrium is that it typically creates unused vertical space which could otherwise be occupied by additional floors.

One of the main public spaces at Federation Square, in Melbourne, Australia, is called The Atrium and is a street-like space, five stories high with glazed walls and roof. The structure and glazing pattern follow the system of fractals used to arrange the panels on the rest of the facades at Federation Square.

In Nashville, Tennessee, U.S., the Opryland Hotel hosts 4 different large atria, spanning 9 acres (36,000 m^{2}) of glass ceiling in total, in the hotel above the gardens of: Delta, Cascades, Garden-Conservatories, and Magnolia.

When it opened in 2019, the Leeza SOHO in Beijing, had the world's tallest atrium at 194 metres (636 ft), replacing the previous record-holder, the Burj Al Arab in Dubai. The Luxor Hotel, in Las Vegas, Nevada, has the largest atrium in the world (by volume) at 29 million cubic feet (820,000 m^{3}).

=== Gallery ===
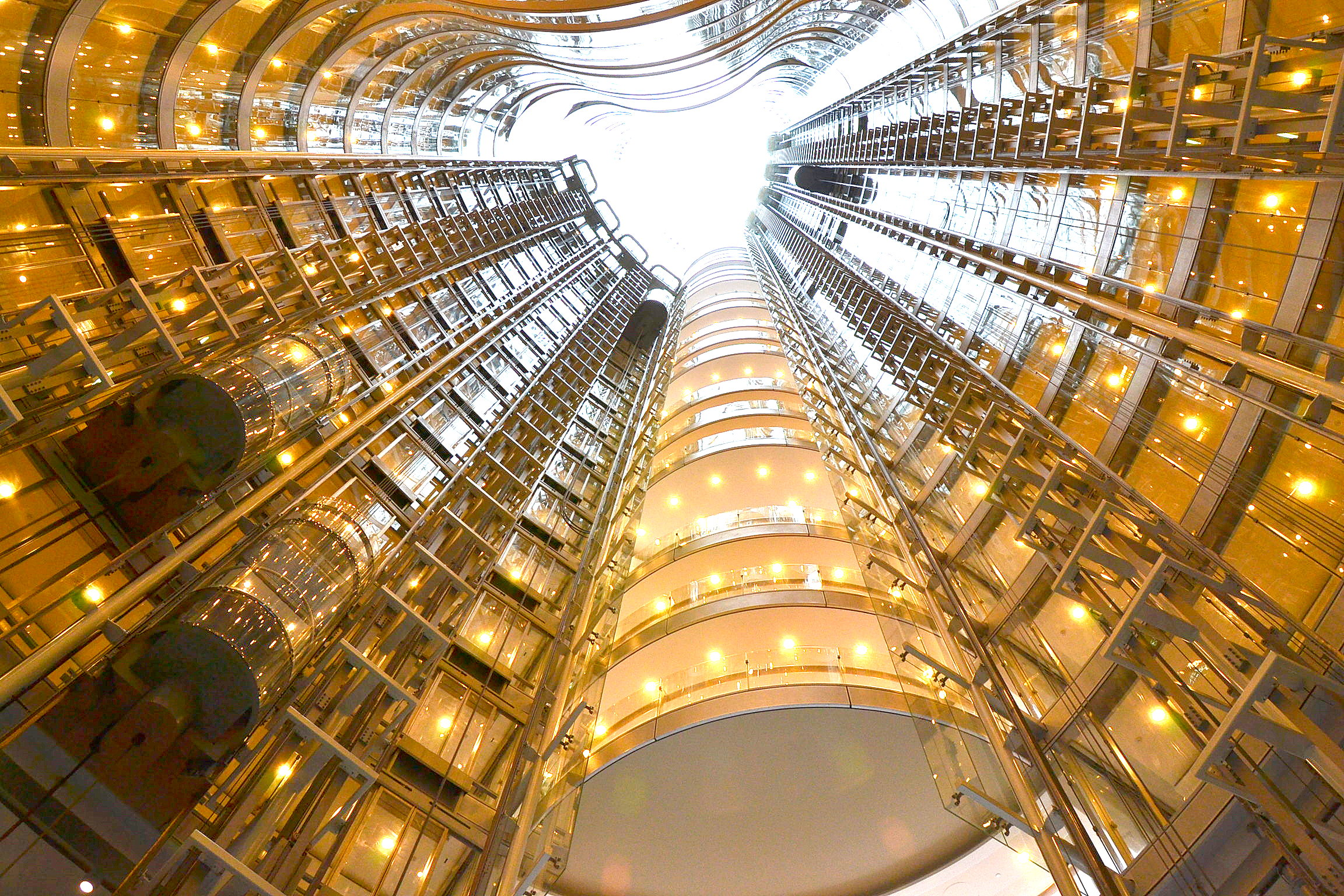
The atrium of 1 Bligh Street, a Sydney office tower, looking upwards

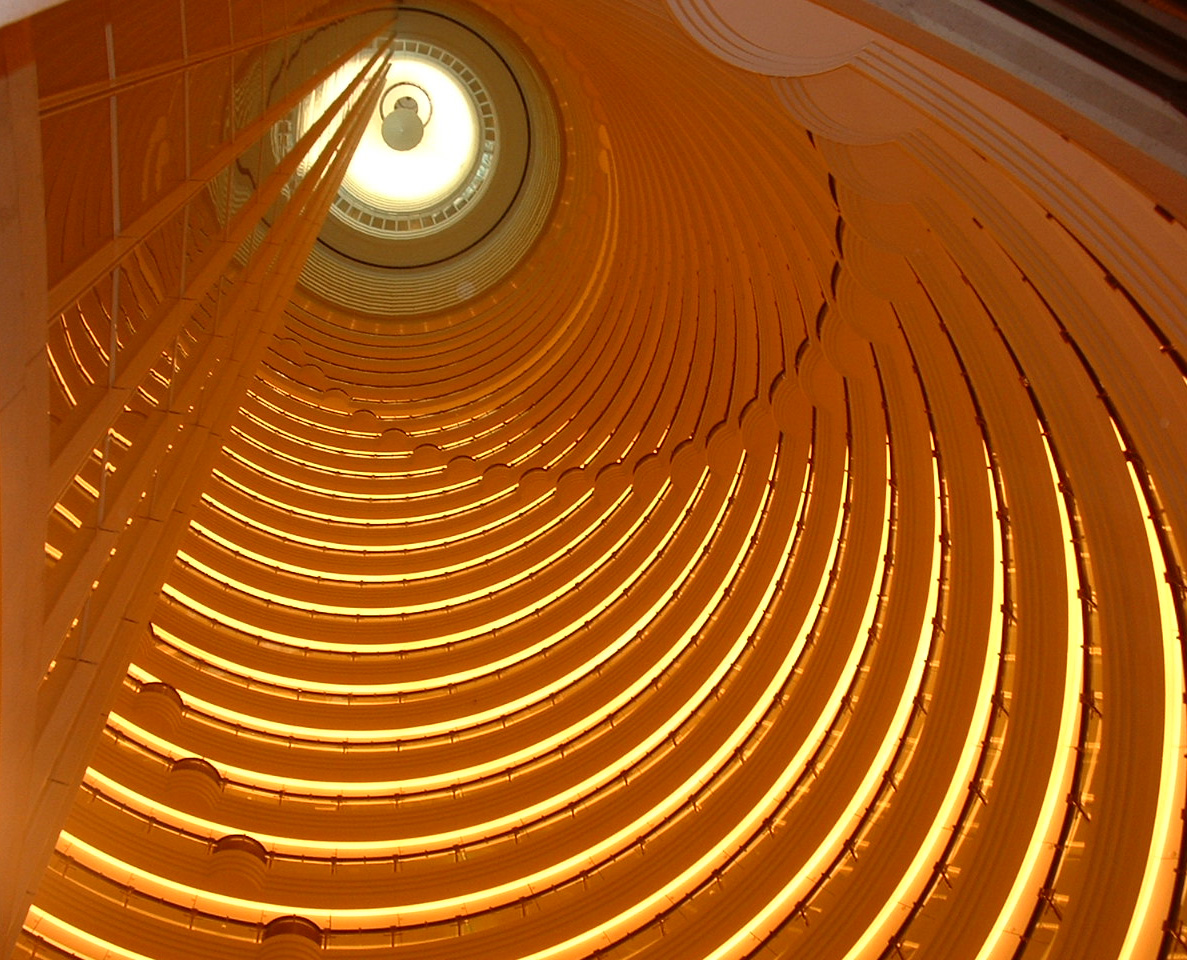
Looking up inside the 32-story atrium of the Shanghai Grand Hyatt, part of the Jin Mao Building

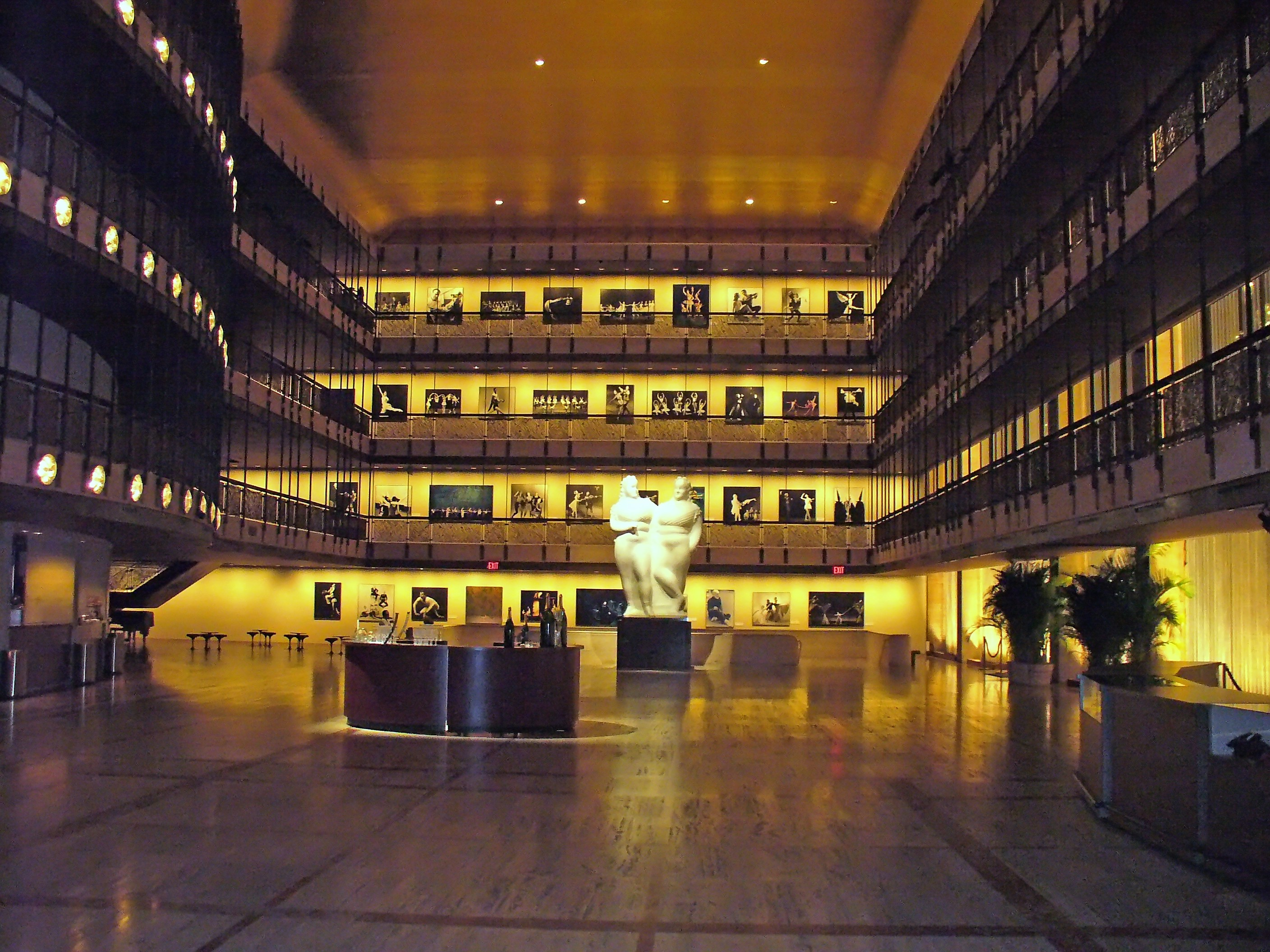
Atrium of the New York State Theater at Lincoln Center

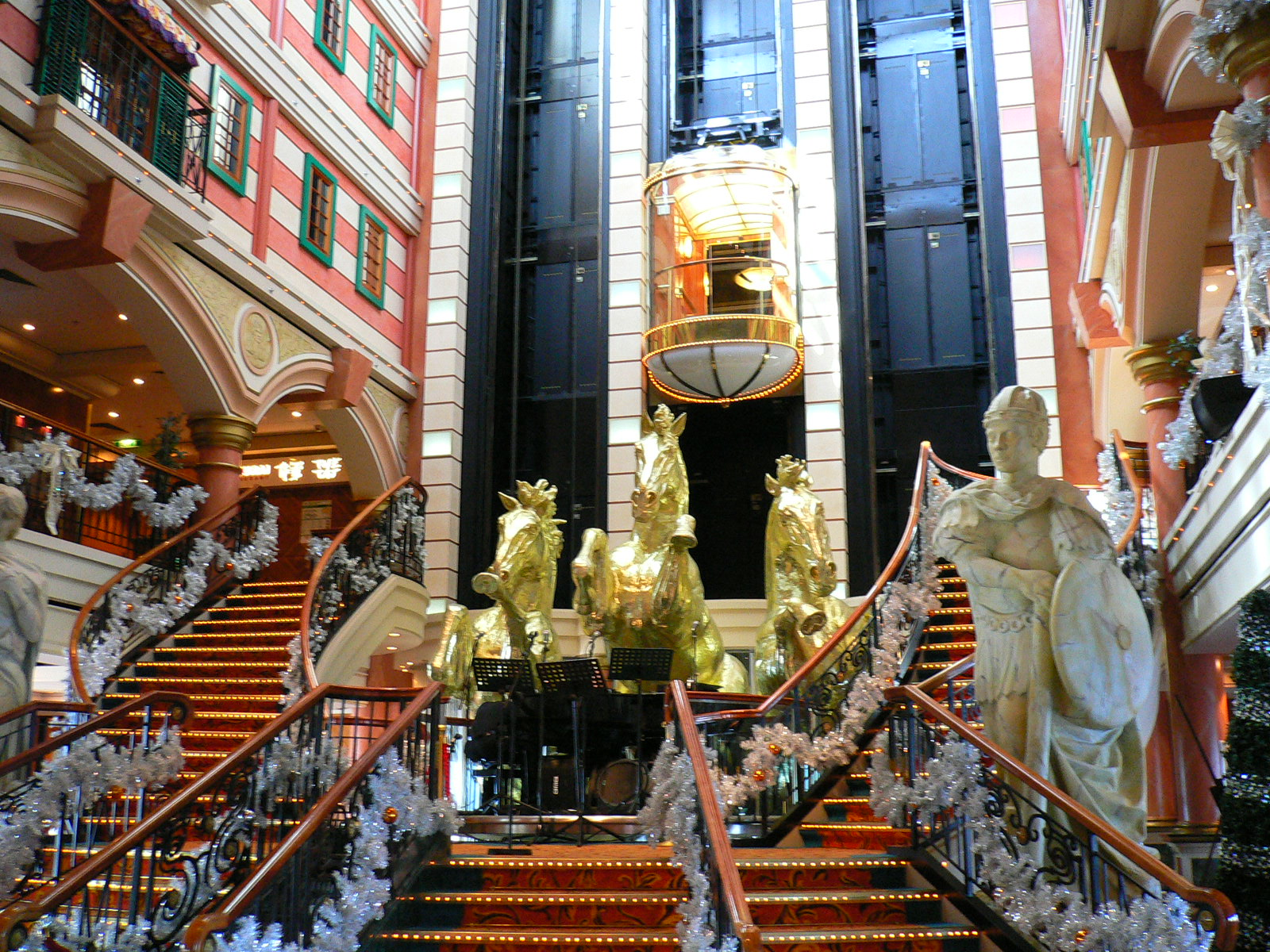
The Grand Piazza atrium inside the SuperStar Virgo

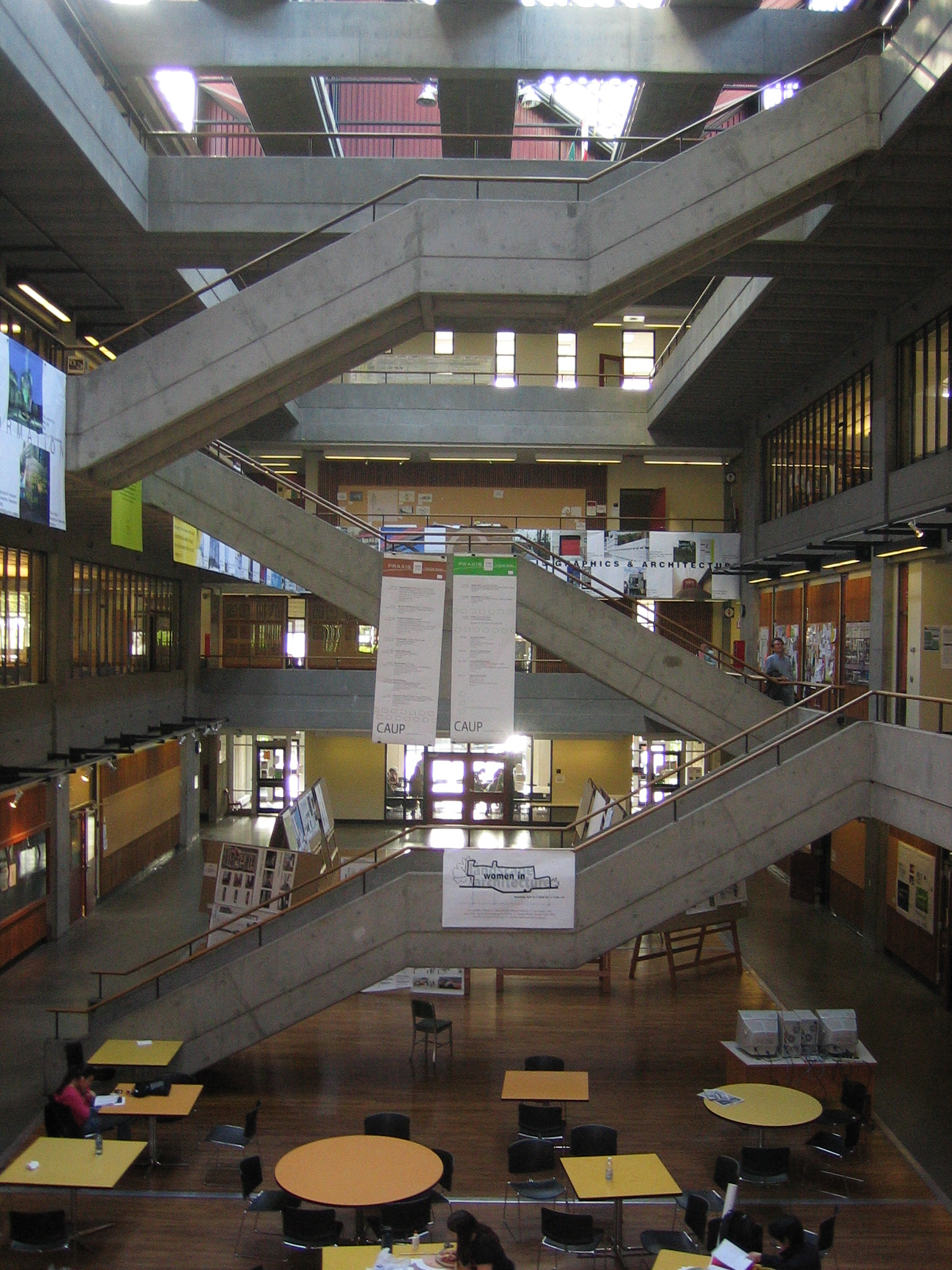
Four floor atrium of Gould Hall, College of Built Environments, at the University of Washington

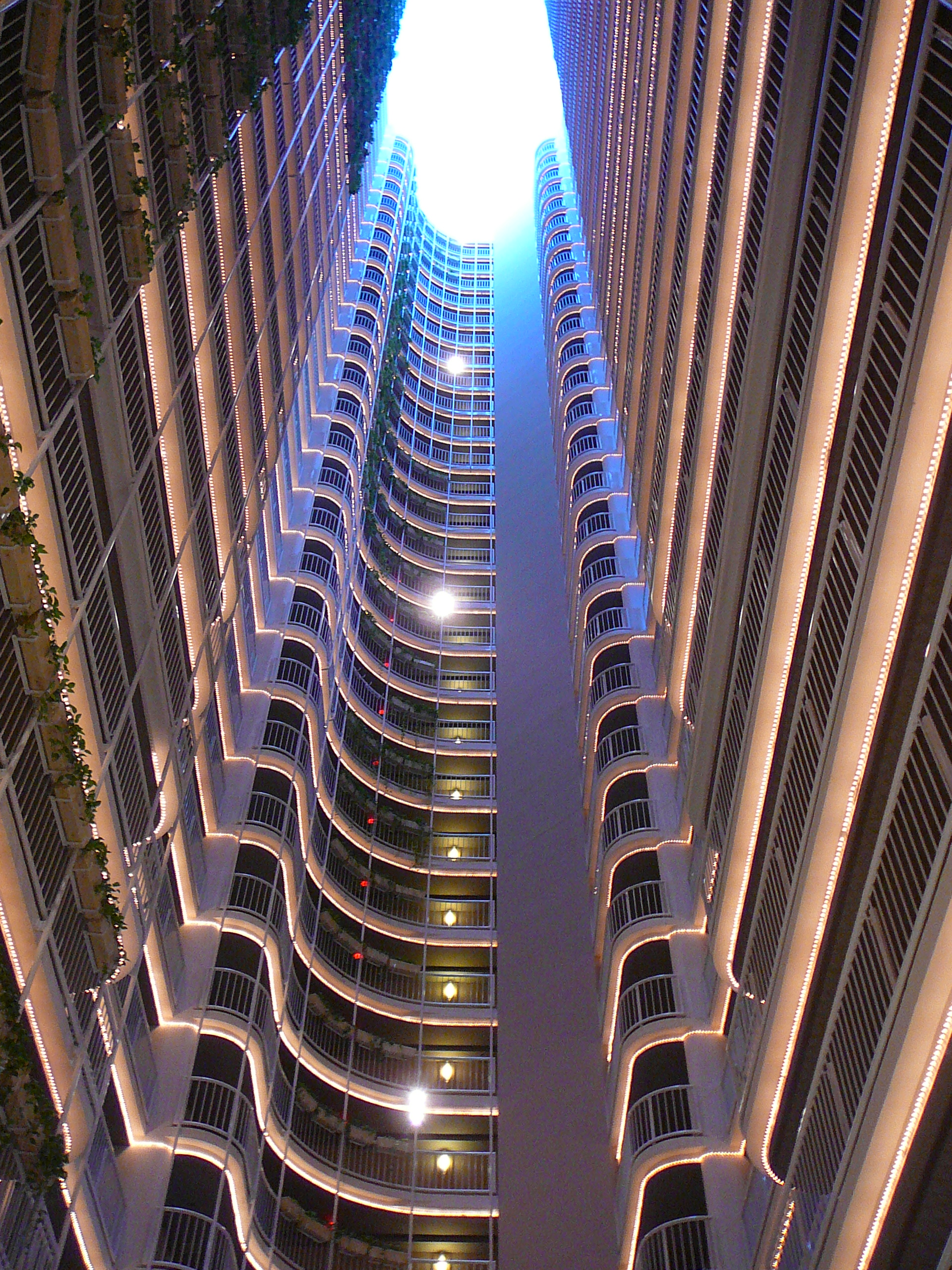
The Grand Doubletree hotel/condo in Downtown Miami 42 story atrium

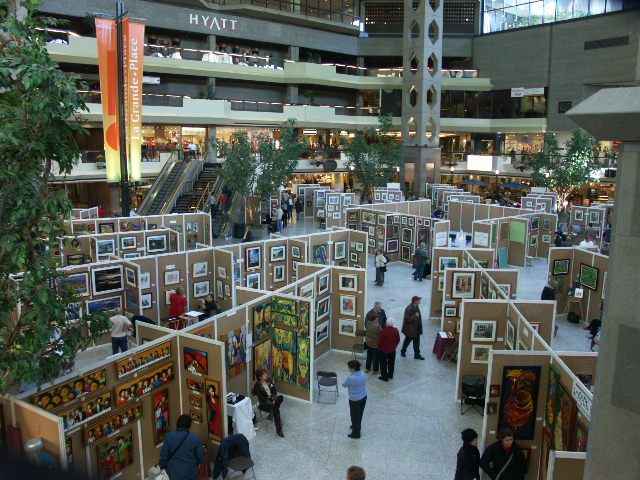
Atrium of Complexe Desjardins, Montreal

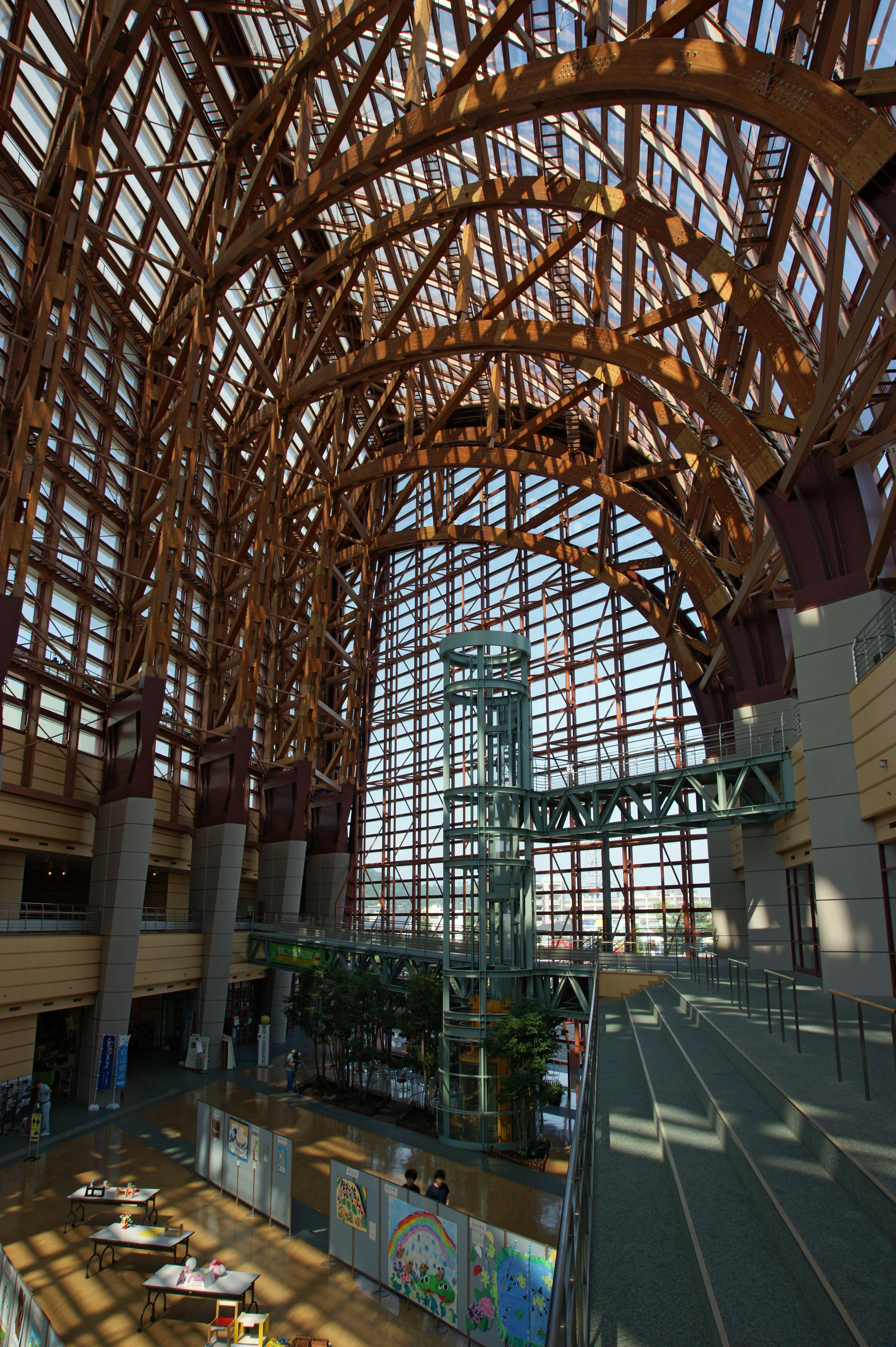
Atrium of Kurayoshi Park Square in Kurayoshi, Japan

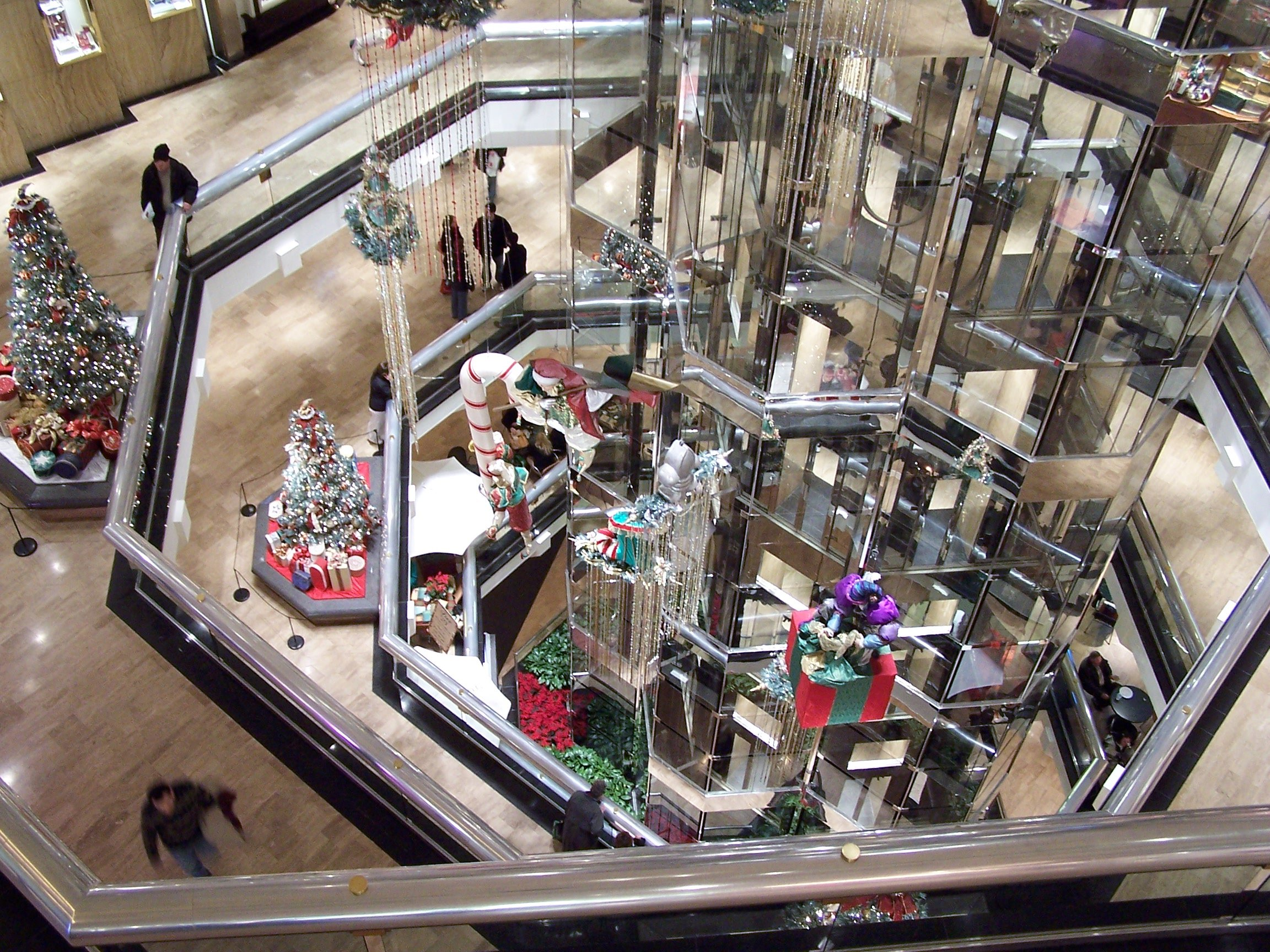
Multi-floor atrium with three see-through octagonal elevator shafts in Water Tower Place in Chicago

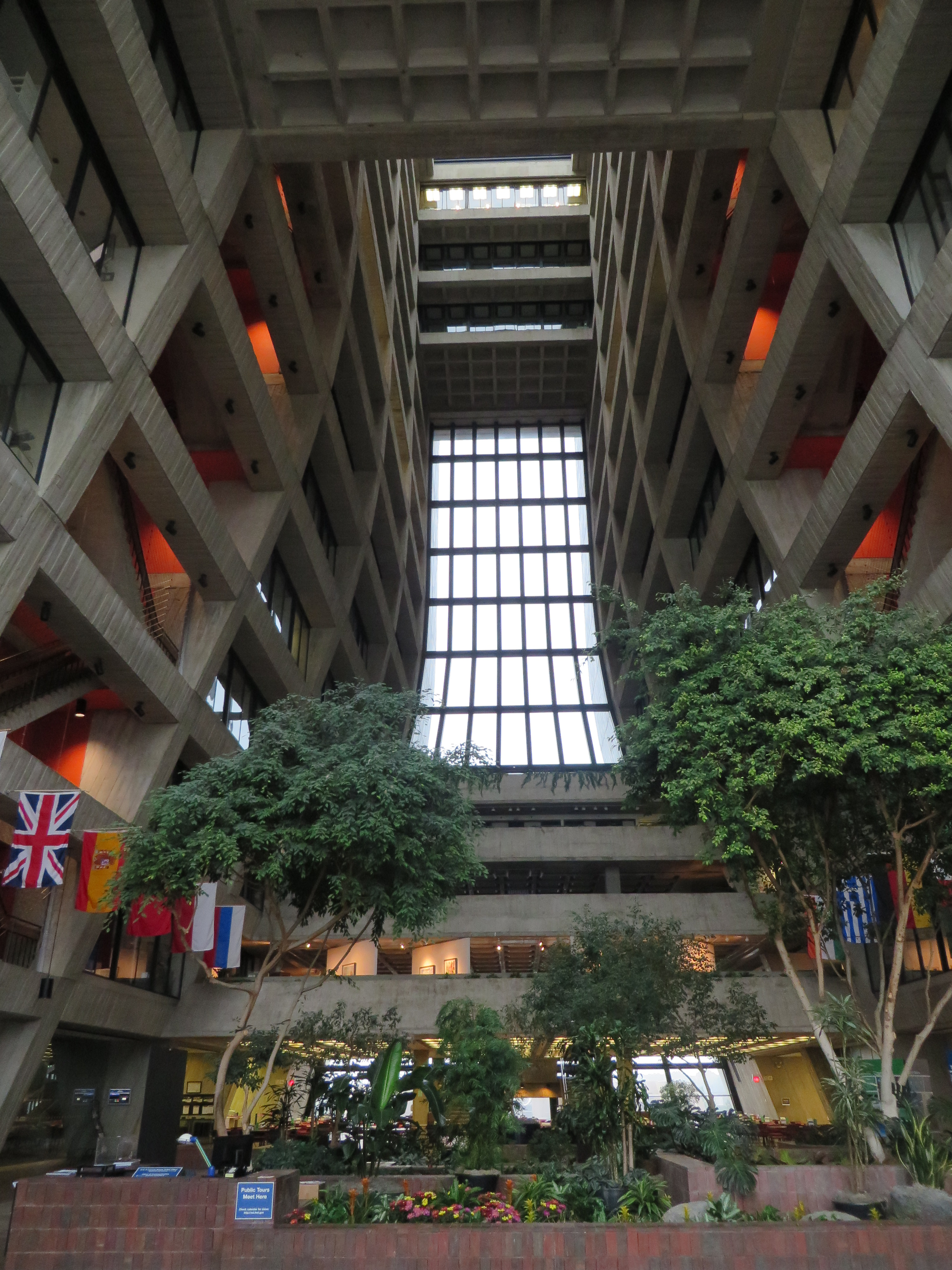
Interior of Wilson Hall at Fermi Lab in Illinois

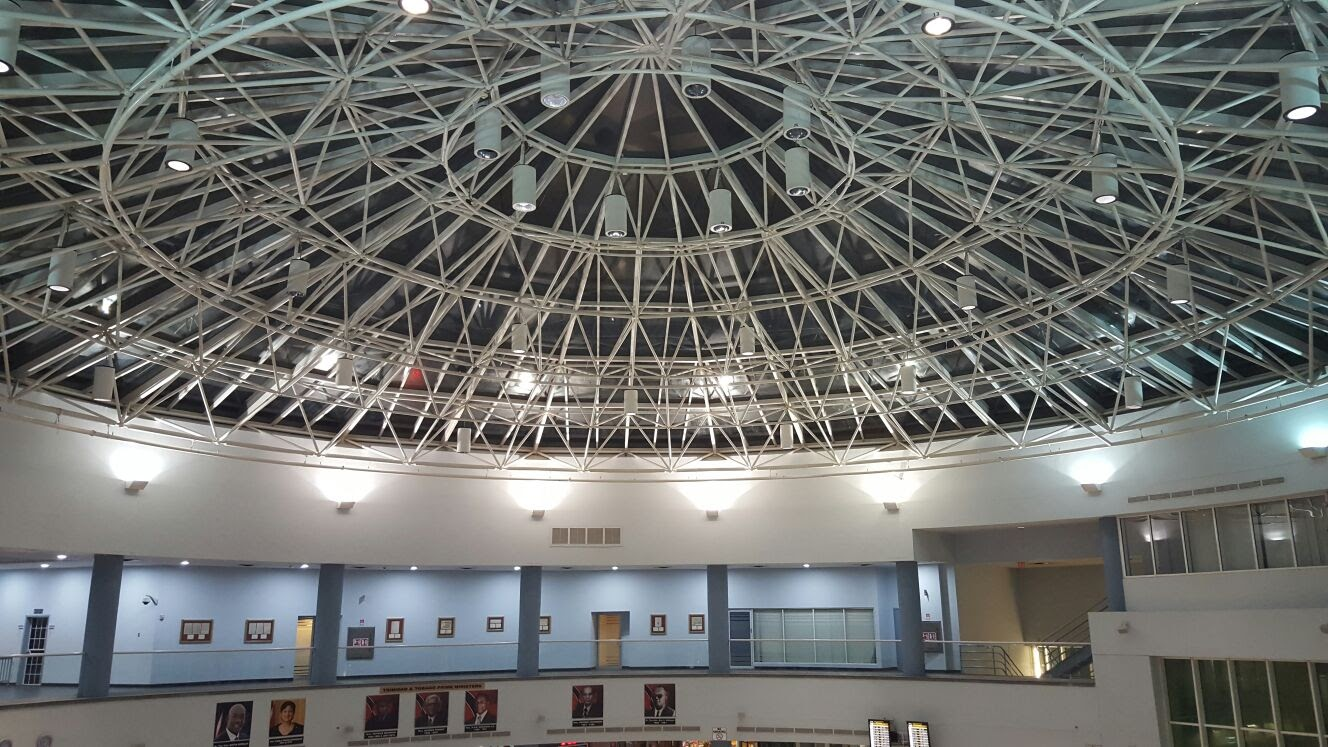
Main atrium of Piarco International Airport

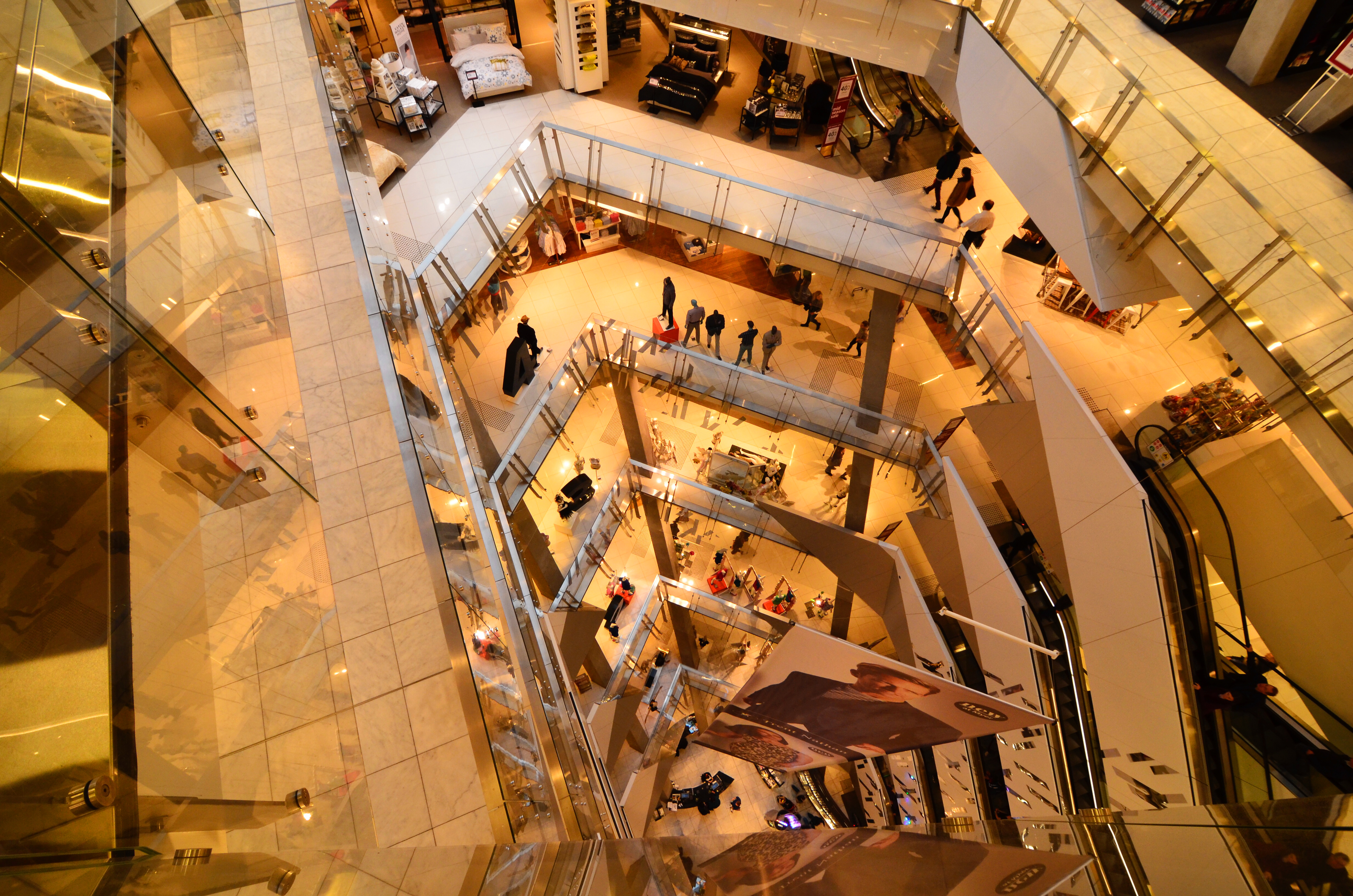
Atrium of a Myer store in Melbourne, looking from the top floor to the ground floor

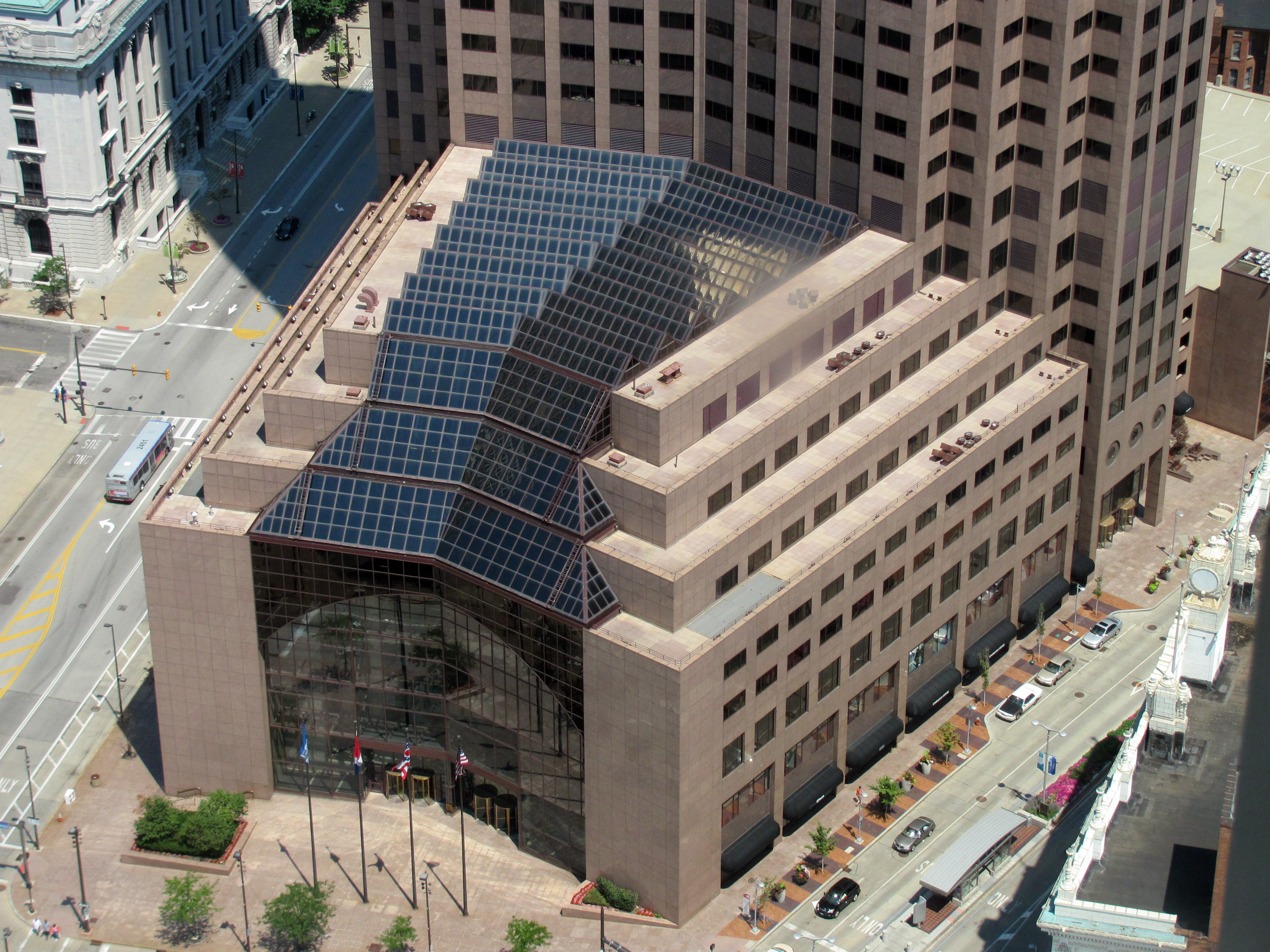
An atrium exterior of the 200 Public Square building in Downtown Cleveland, Ohio.

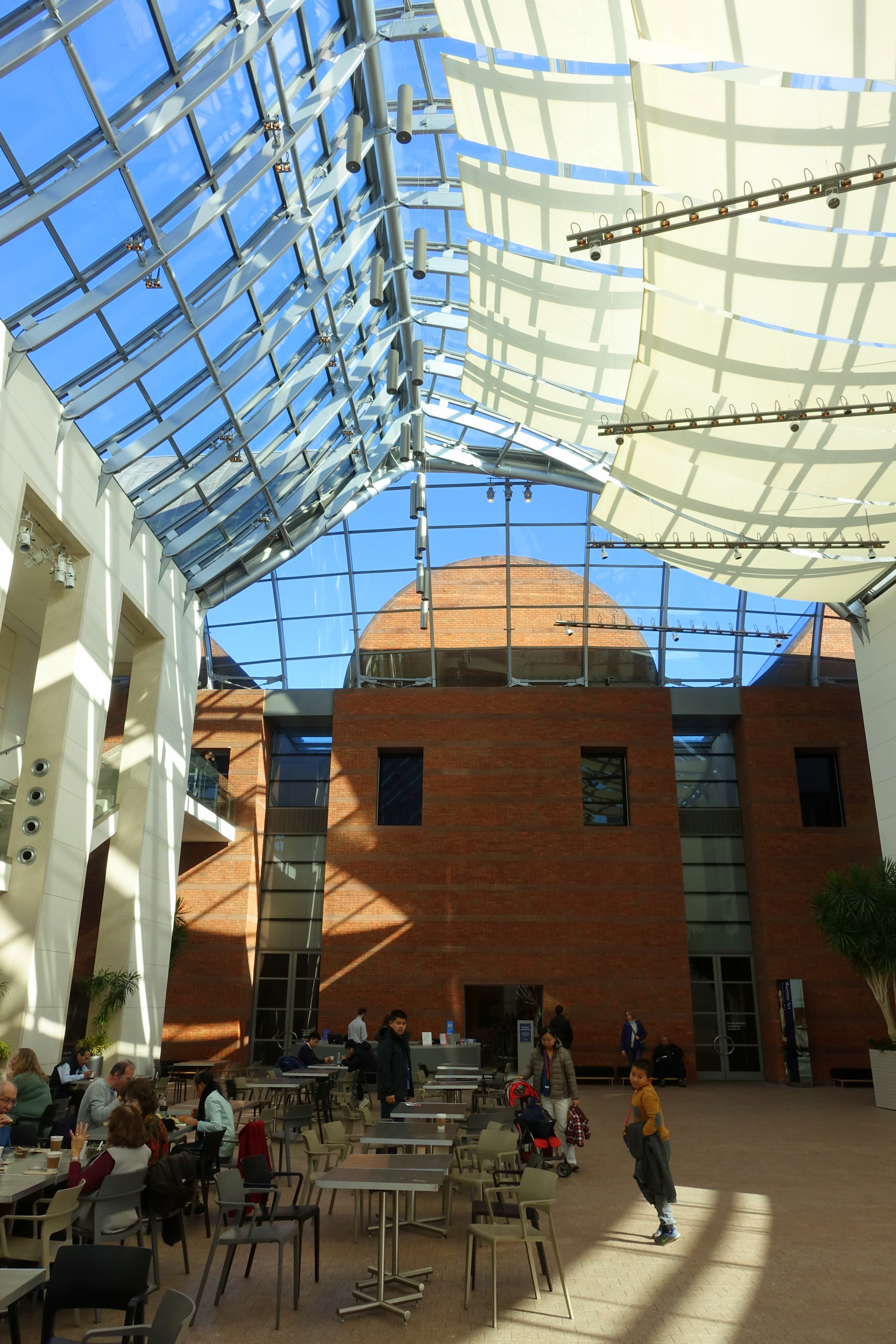
Atrium (architecture) Salem, Massachusetts PEM * Peabody Essex Museum

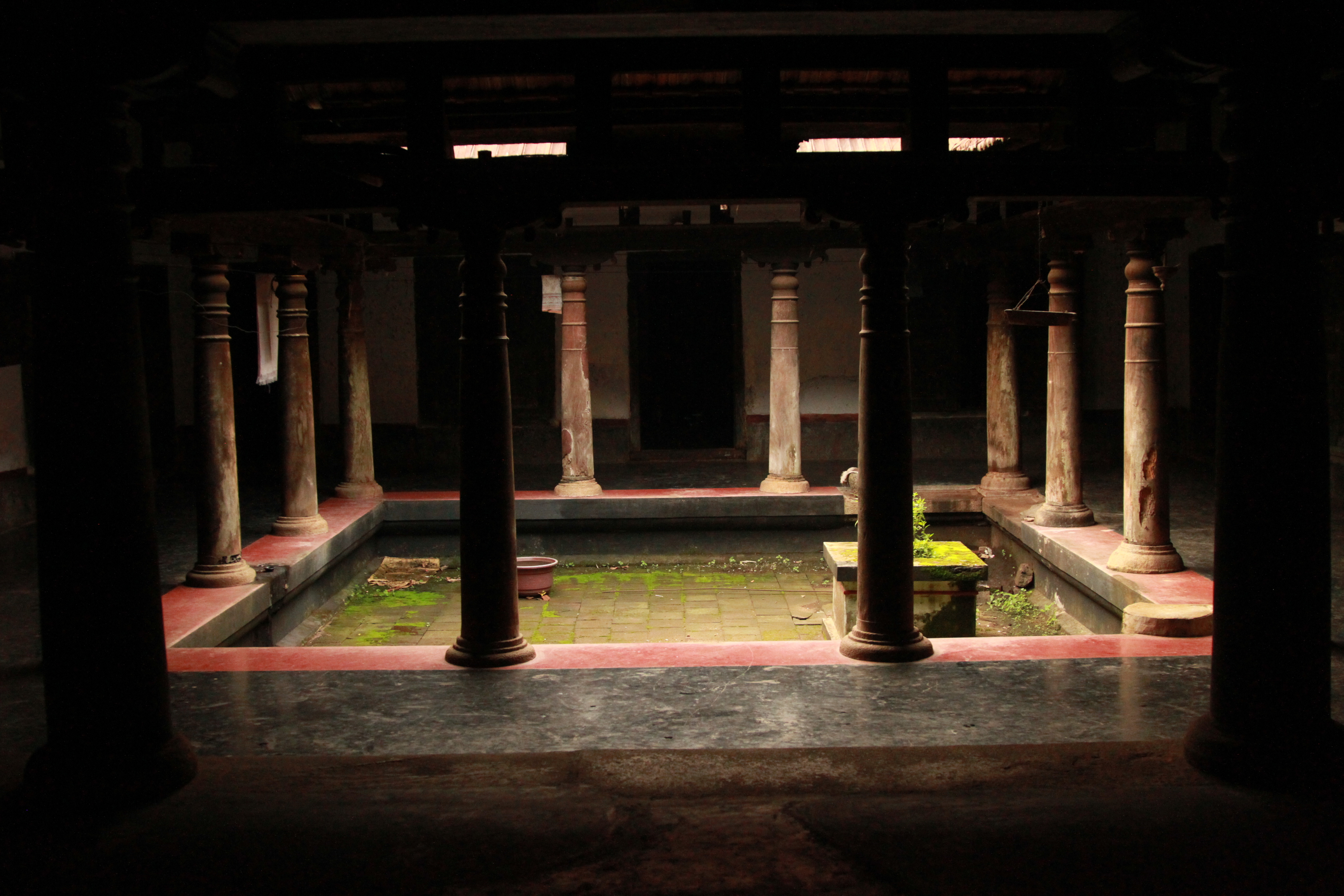
A nadumuttam, or the central atrium of a Kerala Nālukettu.

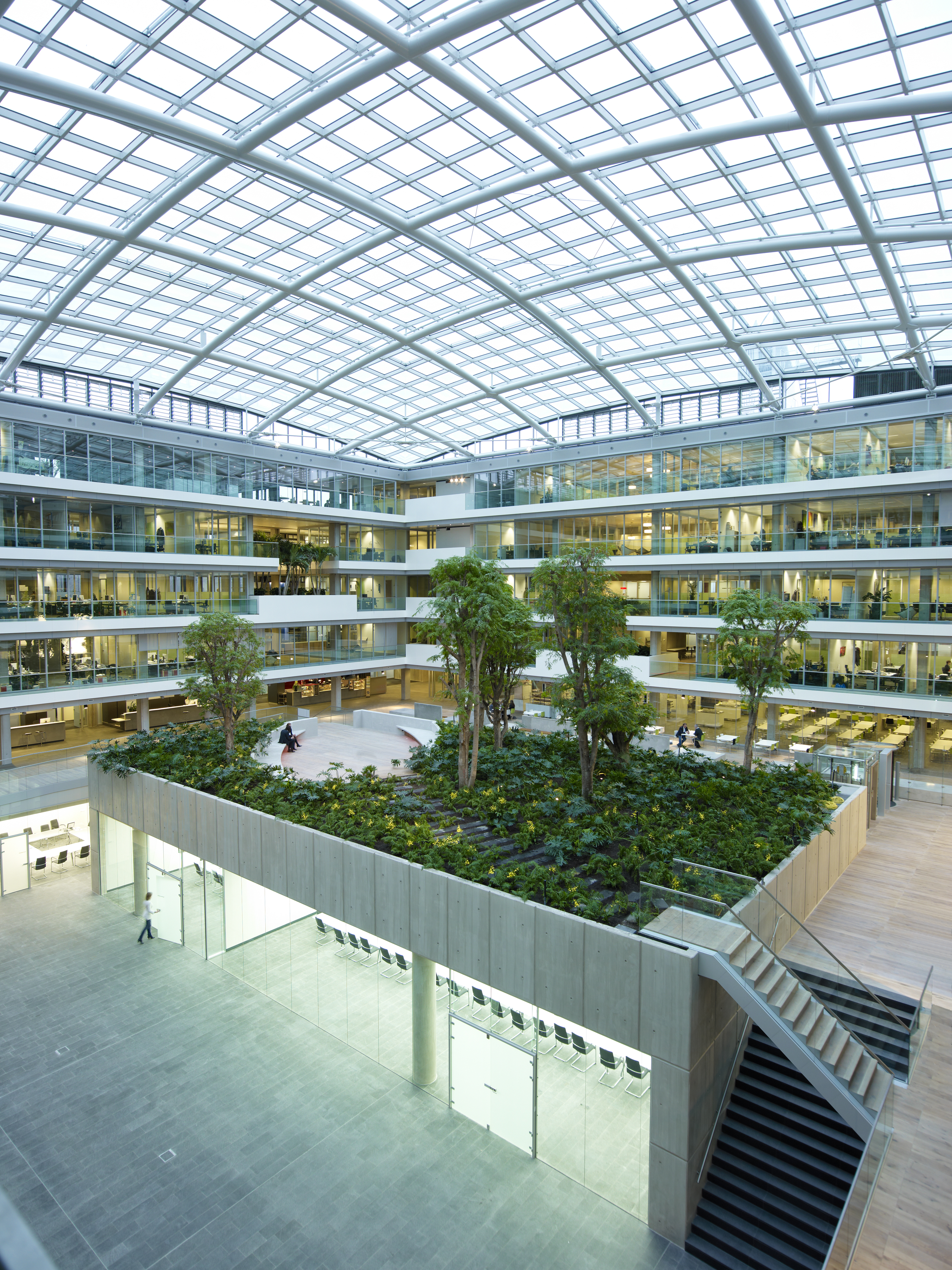
Atrium of the building of Ministry of Finance of the Netherlands

The Burj Al Arab in Dubai with a 180 m (590 ft) tall atrium

== See also ==
- Cavaedium
- Courtyard
- Panopticon
- Quadrangle
