= Wangjing SOHO =

Three tower complex in Beijing, China

- 望京SOHO
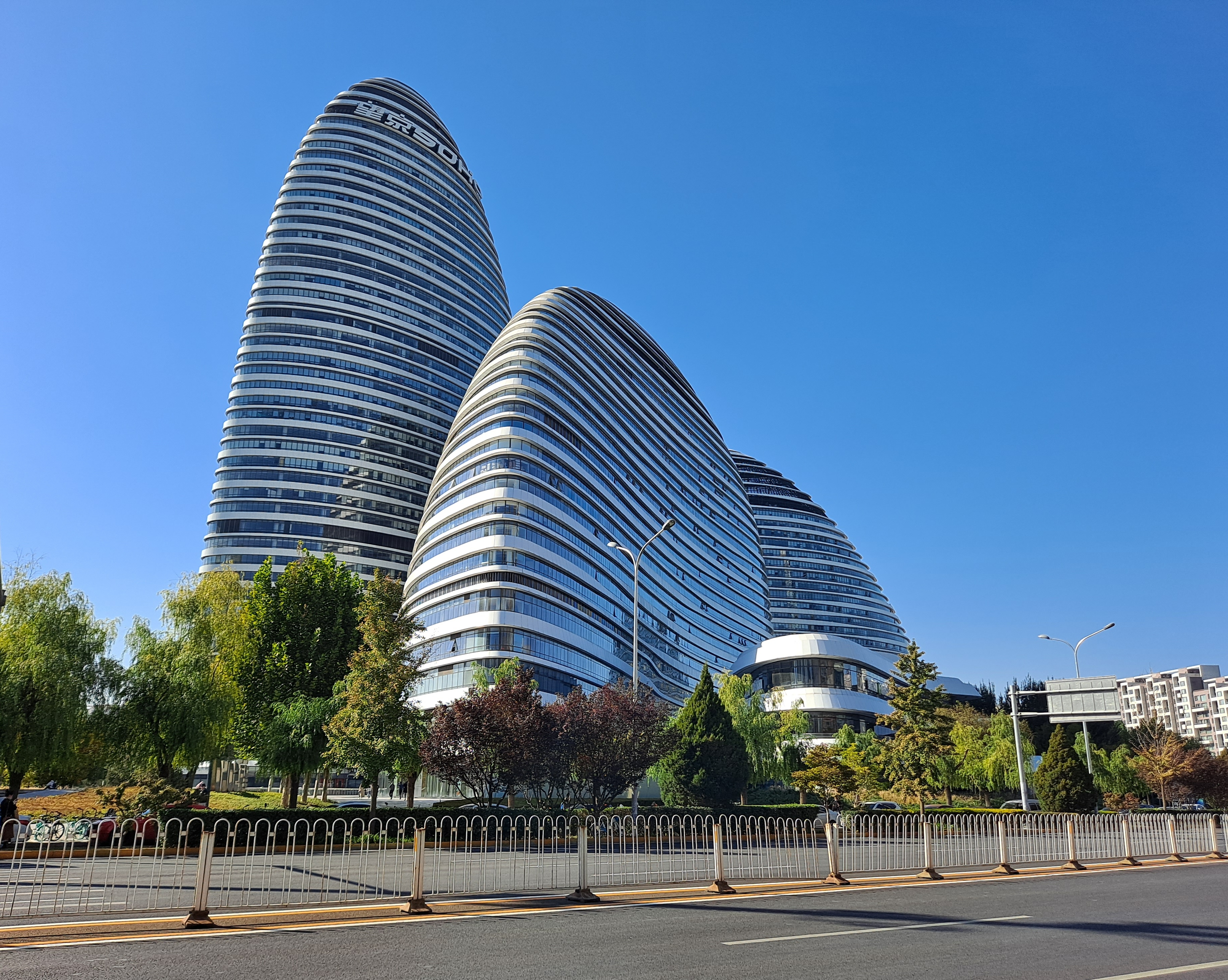
- Wangjing SOHO as of October 2020

General information
- Status: Officially opened
- Location: Beijing, China
- Coordinates: 39.99544°N 116.47475°E
- Opened: 20 September 2014

Design and construction
- Architect: Zaha Hadid

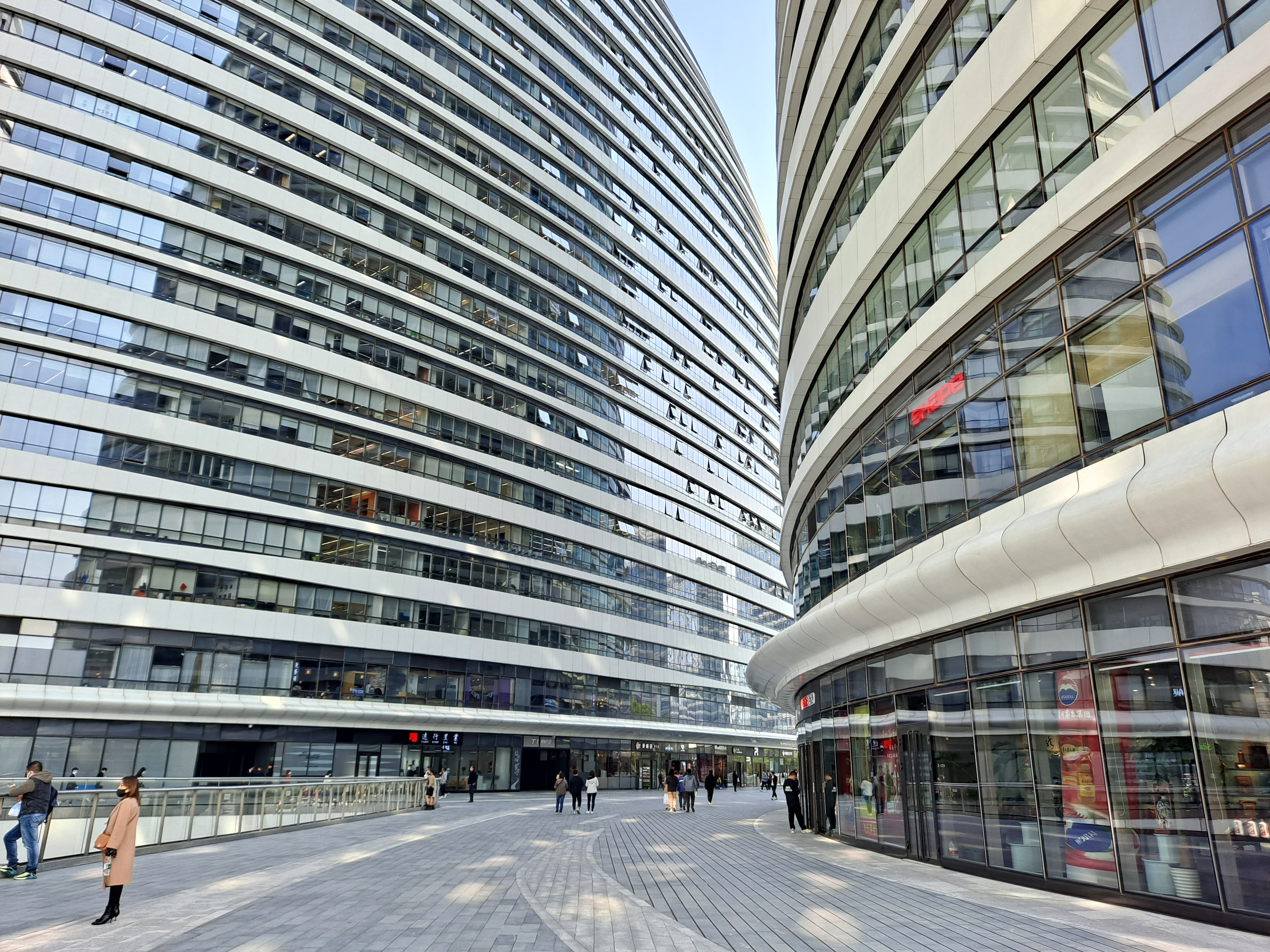
Wangjing SOHO

Wangjing SOHO (Chinese: 望京SOHO; pinyin: Wàngjīng SOHO) is a complex of three curvilinear asymmetric skyscrapers in Wangjing in Beijing, China, between central Beijing and Beijing Capital International Airport. The towers contain both office and retail space. Originally the SOHO was designed as a two-tower complex but due to height concerns it was redesigned as a three-tower project featuring towers of lower maximum height. One of the more than a dozen properties developed by SOHO China, the complex officially opened on 20 September 2014. The tallest of the three towers is the seventh-tallest woman-designed building in the world.

== Design ==
The structure was designed by Iraqi architect Zaha Hadid. According to The Telegraph the curvilinear walls of the towers evoke "dancing Chinese fans", while Der Spiegel describes the three tower complex as "resembling curved sails that appear to swim across the surface of the Earth when viewed from the air". Architecture News Daily (Arch Daily) describes it as "three curved towers whose "shimmering", metallic skin unifies the complex as each volume appears to "dance" around each other." Pan Shiyi, Chairman of the Board of SOHO China, said in an interview that the design of Wangjing SOHO was meant to evoke the image of Koi, a traditional Chinese symbol of wealth, luck, health and happiness.

The double-curvature panels required by the architectural design were used as models in a software programme using Visual Basic operating in a Rhino environment which could subsequently generate flat and single-curvature panels based on the analysis of the local curvature morphology of the original double-curvature panels. The software-driven panel-generation method was used to facilitate the rationalisation of manufactured sheet metal panels and to comply with higher demands in terms of cost requirements and manufacturing complexity.

== Imitation of the design ==
According to Der Spiegel, the design of the Wangjing SOHO has been pirated, by the Meiquan 22nd Century building (美全22世纪) located in the Chinese city of Chongqing. Satoshi Ohashi of Zaha Hadid Architects mentioned that the Chongqing project may have obtained details of the SOHO project in digital form. The Meiquan complex was expected to finish ahead of the Wangjing SOHO project and this development put pressure on Hadid to speed-up her plans to finish her SOHO project ahead of the competing towers in Chongqing. Ohashi mentioned that Zaha Hadid Architects had taken legal measures against Chongqing Meiquan Properties Ltd.

Yet You Yunting, a lawyer practising in Shanghai, specialising in intellectual property cases, and founder of an online journal covering Chinese copyright laws, had found that great similarities existed between the two projects and that there was a good legal case for the Zaha Architects to file a copyright infringement lawsuit against the other company. He also mentioned that: "But even if the judge rules in favor of SOHO, the court will not force the defendant to pull the building down. But it could order the payment of compensation."

On 14 May 2012 the companies which built the two projects, SOHO China and Chongqing Meiquan held a press conference during which the Chongqing Meiquan representative stated that the inspiration behind the design of the Meiquan 22nd Century project were "the cobblestones on the bank of the Yangtze River by which Chongqing was built". Pan Shiyi, the Wanjing SOHO representative, countered that the design of the Wanjing towers was meant to evoke the Koi fish and declared his intention of filing a lawsuit, saying that intellectual property had to be protected in China. During the press conference the Chinese Intellectual Property commission was present and issued a report at the end of the event. The developer of the Chongqing Meiquan project later wrote in the company blog: "Never meant to copy, only want to surpass."

Dutch architect Rem Koolhaas told Der Spiegel that the rapid growth of Chinese cities has led to the appearance of architects who "copy and paste" architectural elements from other designs and create new composite designs. Koolhaas calls these architects "Photoshop designers" and says: "Photoshop allows us to make collages of photographs -- (and) this is the essence of (China's) architectural and urban production…. Design today becomes as easy as Photoshop, even on the scale of a city." Zaha Hadid's reaction was more philosophical; she said that it would be "quite exciting" if the cloned designs came up in the future with "innovative design mutations".
