= Backwoods Gallery =

Contemporary art gallery in Australia

- Location within Australia
- Established: 2010
- Location: Collingwood, Victoria, Australia
- Coordinates: 37°47′52.566″S 144°59′9.88″E
- Type: Contemporary art; Street art; Urban art; Graffiti art
- Website: www.backwoods.gallery

Backwoods Gallery is a contemporary art gallery located in the Melbourne suburb of Collingwood, Australia.

== History ==
Backwoods Gallery opened in the back streets of Collingwood in 2010 with the purpose of exhibiting contemporary art by emerging artists from Australia and around the world. Backwoods was founded by members of the Everfresh Studio and 25 Easey St community.

== Exhibitions ==
=== Exhibitions 2010 ===
Dates	Exhibition	Artist(s)
25/09/2010 – 10/10/2010	Shake That Ass	Yasumasa Yonehara
05/11/2010 – 13/11/2010	Too Big To Be Human	Petro
20/11/2010 – 04/12/2010	Omni	Kami and Sasu
17/17/2010 – 23/12/2010	SALE!	Lush

=== Exhibitions 2011 ===
Dates	Exhibition	Artist(s)
25/03/2011 – 11/04/2011	Down Low, Too Slow	James Reka
15/04/2011 – 20/04/2011	New Yellow 01	Jun Inoue
20/05/2011 – 10/06/2011	If We’re Going, Then Lets Go	Ghostpatrol
17/06/2011 – 26/06/2011	l’inconnue de la rue	Rone
15/07/2011 – 30/07/2011	Oriental Elements	Usugrow, Toshikazu Nozaka
19/08/2011 – 30/08/2011	Inner Demons II	Meggs
09/09/2011 – 25/09/2011	You Have No Chance With Coincidence	Yuske Imai
14/10/2011 – 30/10/2011	Lite Works	Stabbs
18/11/2011 – 05/12/2011	Momoka	Tanja Jade McMillan (Misery)
09/12/2011 – 12/12/2011	Another Shithouse "Art" Show	Lush

=== Exhibitions 2012 ===
Dates	Exhibition	Artist(s)
10/02/2012 – 10/02/2012	Oath Of Armageddon	French
18/02/2012 – 20/02/2012	Bode Australian Tour	Mark Bode
02/03/2012 – 16/02/2012	Primary Suspects	James Reka
24/04/2012 – 06/05/2012	Natural Progression	Beastman
01/05/2012 – 16/06/2012	Cosmic Scale And The Super Future	Ghostpatrol
20/06/2012 – 22/06/2012	Open Studio	James Reka
29/06/2012 – 10/07/2012	Fall From Grace	Rone
03/08/2012 – 12/08/2012	Jet Babies	Stephen Ives
17/08/2012 – 26/08/2012	Decorating The Apocalypse	Fred Fowler
14/09/2012 – 30/09/2012	Seven Samurai	Hiroyasu Tsuri (TwoOne)
07/09/2012 – 30/09/2012	Hakuchi	Shohei Otomo
12/10/2012 – 14/10/2012	A Study Of Hands	Anthony Lister, Ashley Wood, Dave Kinsey, Haroshi, James Reka, James Greenaway, Ian Strange, Mark Bode, Shohei Otomo, Hiroyasu Tsuri, Usugrow, Yuske Imai, Alexander Mitchell
19/10/2012 – 28/10/2012	Truth In Myth II	Meggs
16/11/2012 – 19/11/2012	Neds Maps and Other Outback Stories	Mark Bode
30/11/2012 – 16/12/2012	Carrion	ROA

=== Exhibitions 2013 ===
Dates	Exhibition	Artist(s)
01/01/2013 – 28/02/2013	Artist Residency	James Reka
01/03/2013 – 03/03/2013	The Evolution Of A Graffiti Shitcunt	Lush
31/03/2013 – 15/03/2013	Organized Chaos	Slicer
19/04/2013 – 05/05/2013	Ecstasy In the Abyss	Shida
24/05/2013 – 09/06/2013	Hero	Stephen Ives
12/07/2013 – 21/07/2013	Define Nothing	Hiroyasu Tsuri (TwoOne)
15/08/2013 – 25/08/2013	Take Me To Your Leader	Shohei Takasaki
20/09/2013 – 28/09/2013	Coalescence	DrewFunk, Otis Chamberlain
18/10/2013 – 03/11/2013	Bright Night Sky	Stanislava Pinchuk
15/11/2013 – 24/11/2013	KUH	Jun Inoue
06/12/2013 – 15/12/2013	A Study Of Eyes	Al Stark, Anthony Lister, Dave Kinsey, Hiroyasu Tsuri, Alexander Mitchell, James Reka, Ian Strange, Kozyndan, Marda, Miss Van, Shohei Otomo, Stanislava Pinchuk, Stephen Ives, Usugrow, Yuske Imai

=== Exhibitions 2014 ===
Dates	Exhibition	Artist(s)
17/01/2014 – 26/01/2014	The Existential Vacuum	Jonathan Guthmann
10/02/2014 – 21/02/2014	Backwoods Retrospective	Stanislava Pinchuk, Ghostpatrol, Hiroyasu Tsuri, Fred Fowler & James Reka
7/03/2014 – 16/03/2014	Gold Blood, Magic Wierdos	Ghostpatrol, Brendan Monroe, Simon Hanselmann, kozyndan, Sheryo, The Yok, Jean Jullien, James Jirat Patradoon, Mr. Gauky, Mel Stringer
18/04/2014 – 27/04/2014	Keep It Simple	Stabs
02/05/2014 – 11/05/2014	Stick Folk	Tom Civil
06/06/2014 – 15/06/2014	Untold	James Reka
20/06/2014 – 29/06/2014	New Landscapes	Fred Fowler
18/07/2014 – 27/07/2014	Drawing Blood	Eno
19/07/2014 – 27/07/2014	Modern-Classic	Shun Kawakami
01/08/2014 – 10/08/2014	Bright Lights	Numskull
22/08/2014 – 31/08/2014	Oblivion	Yusk Imai
26/09/2014 – 05/10/2014	A Study Of Hair	Merda, Inkie, C215, Dave Kinsey, Mark Bode, Stanislava Pinchuk (Miso), Faith47, Shohei Otomo, Jonathan Guthmann, ROA, Stephen Ives, Hiroyasu Tsuri (TwoOne), Usugrow, Yusk Imai, Alexander Mitchell.
10/10/2014 – 19/10/2014	Outsiders	Hiroyasu Tsuri (TwoOne)
24/10/2014 – 02/11/2014	Flat Blend	Shohei Otomo, Kosuke Kawamura
04/11/2014 – 16/11/2014	Flat Blend	Jun Inoue
28/11/2014 – 07/12/2014	Silent Landscapes	Stanislava Pinchuk
06/12/2013 – 07/12/2013	81 Bastards	Jun Inoue, Yoshi47, Mhak, Jun Inoue, Sand, O.T

=== Exhibitions 2015 ===
Dates	Exhibition	Artist(s)
2015	Waterworld	Fintan Magee
2015	Stereodynamica	Felipe Pantone
2015	Snow Landscapes	Shun Kawakami
2015	Rockgroup	Sheone & O-Two
2015	Apocalypse	Jonathan Guthmann
2015	Ricochet	DEM189
2015	Sloe Trails	Acorn
2015	Bleak	Stephen Ives
2015	Razzle Dazzle	Clemens Behr
2015	Back and Forth	Nelio
2015	Heavy Leisure	Evie Cahir & Gemma Topliss

=== Exhibitions 2016 ===
Dates	Exhibition	Artist(s)
2016	Bring Cash	Lushsux
2016	100 Faces	Hiroyasu Tsuri
2016	Mors	Jonathan Guthman
2016	Brainfade	French
2016	Spectrum	Senekt
2016	The Mortal Drama	Yusk Imai
2016	Hic Svnt Dracones	ROA
2016	In The Fold	Taj ‘Deams’ Alexander
2016	Ki-Oku	Goma
2016	Doomsday Song	Guy Mathews
2016	Summoning Lovers Out of Time	Shida
2016	Wizards, Lizards and Broads	Mark Bode
2016	Ora Ora	Shohei Otomo
2016	Facing Deconstruction	Ed Bechervaise (Unwellbunny)
2016	Mirror Stage	Kim Hyunji
2016	Equilibrium	Senekt
2016	Self Loathing	Mic Porter
2016	The Resistible Rise of a Bear of Little Brain	Stephen Ives
2016	Transition	Taj ‘Deams’ Alexander
2016	Stroke	Shun Kawakami & Jun Inoue
2016	A Study of Erotica	Alexander Mitchell, Alpha Channeling, Anthony Lister, Ashley Wood, Kes Acorn, Kim Hyunji, Kristen Liu Wong, Senekt, Shida, Shohei Takasaki, Susanna Rose Sykes, Takeru Amano, Yone
