= Ian Strange =

Ian Strange may refer to:

- Ian Strange (British artist) (1934–2018)
- Ian Strange (Australian artist) (born 1983)

== See also ==
- Ian Strang (1886–1952), British draughtsman and etcher
