= Fintan Magee =

Australian artist

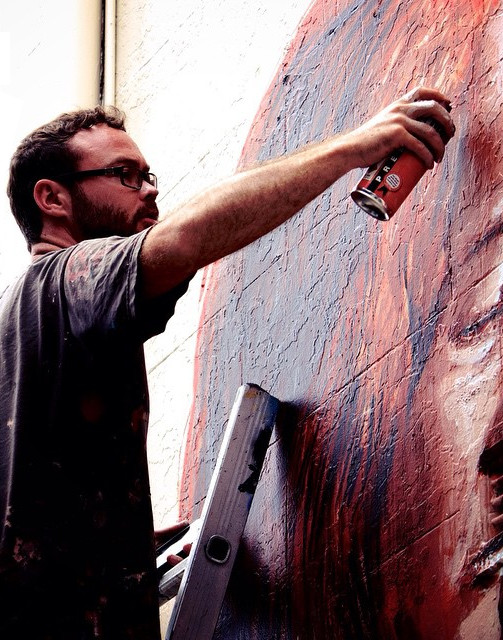
- Born: 1985; Lismore, New South Wales, Australia
- Known for: Large-scale murals and street art that address social and environmental issues.
- Movement: Graffiti writer

Fintan Magee is an Australian street artist known for his murals throughout Australia and the world. Born in Lismore, New South Wales, he grew up in Brisbane, gaining a reputation as a graffiti writer before obtaining a fine arts degree and relocating to Sydney.

== Work ==
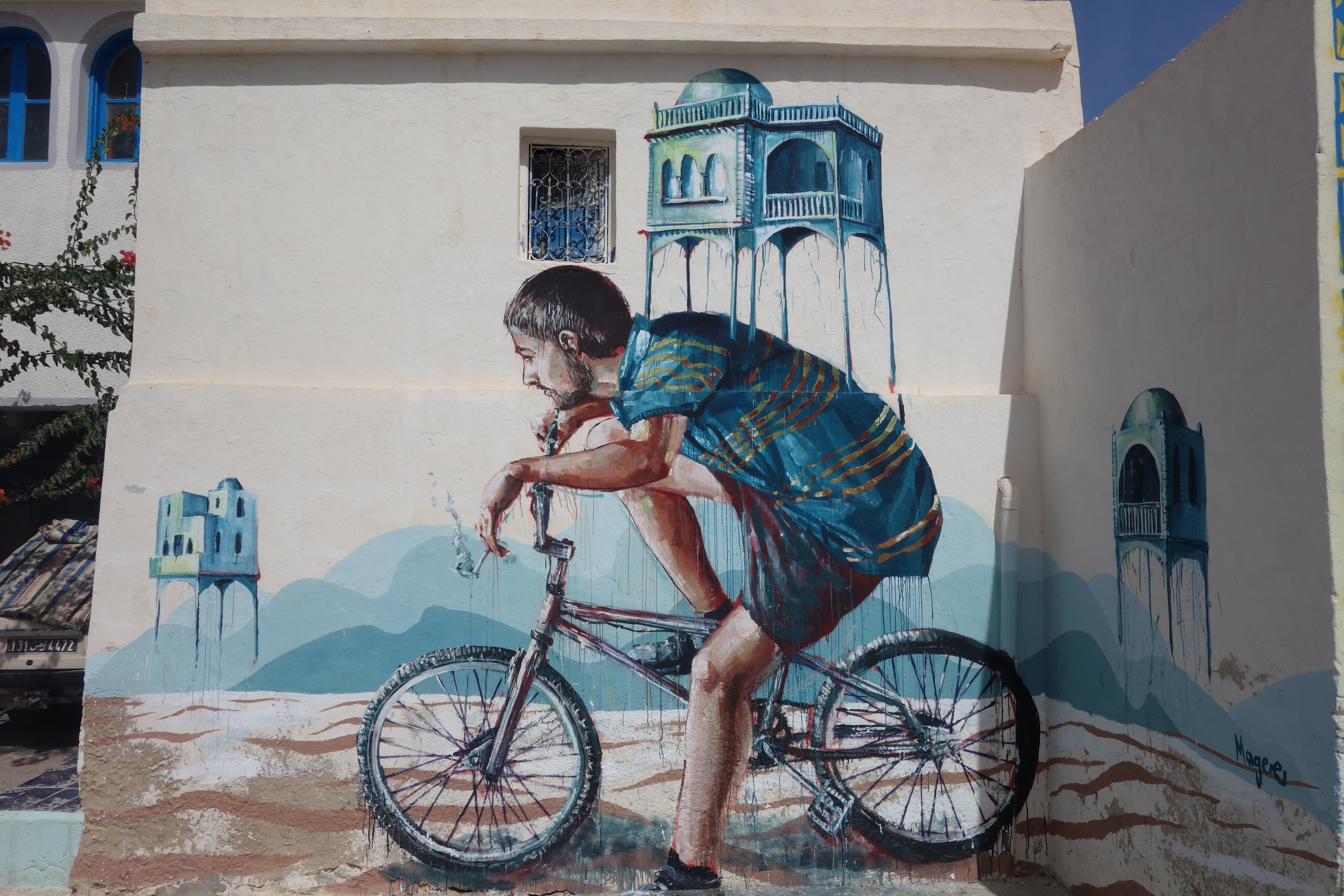
Mural by Fintan Magee in Djerbahood, Tunisia

He has been described as "Australia's Banksy" by a number of media outlets although Magee has stated in various interviews that he hates this and has stated it is a result of "lazy journalism".

His work often deals with environmental issues. In 2015 his solo show at Backwoods Gallery in Melbourne was themed around his own personal experiences in the 2011 Brisbane floods. He often uses personal stories to talk about broader issues like climate change and the migrant crisis.

He received national acclaim for his mural depicting Felix Baumgartner in Brisbane, and has participated in various public art festivals in Australia and abroad. Along with other recognised street artists from around Australia, Magee contributed to Toowoomba's "First Coat" program.

== Family background ==
Fintan has Irish, English and Australian ancestry, his father is from Derry in Northern Ireland and his mother is English born. His maternal grandfather, who was from Woollahra in Sydney, had an architectural practice in Ghana, West Africa.
