= Djerbahood =

Street art event in Tunisia

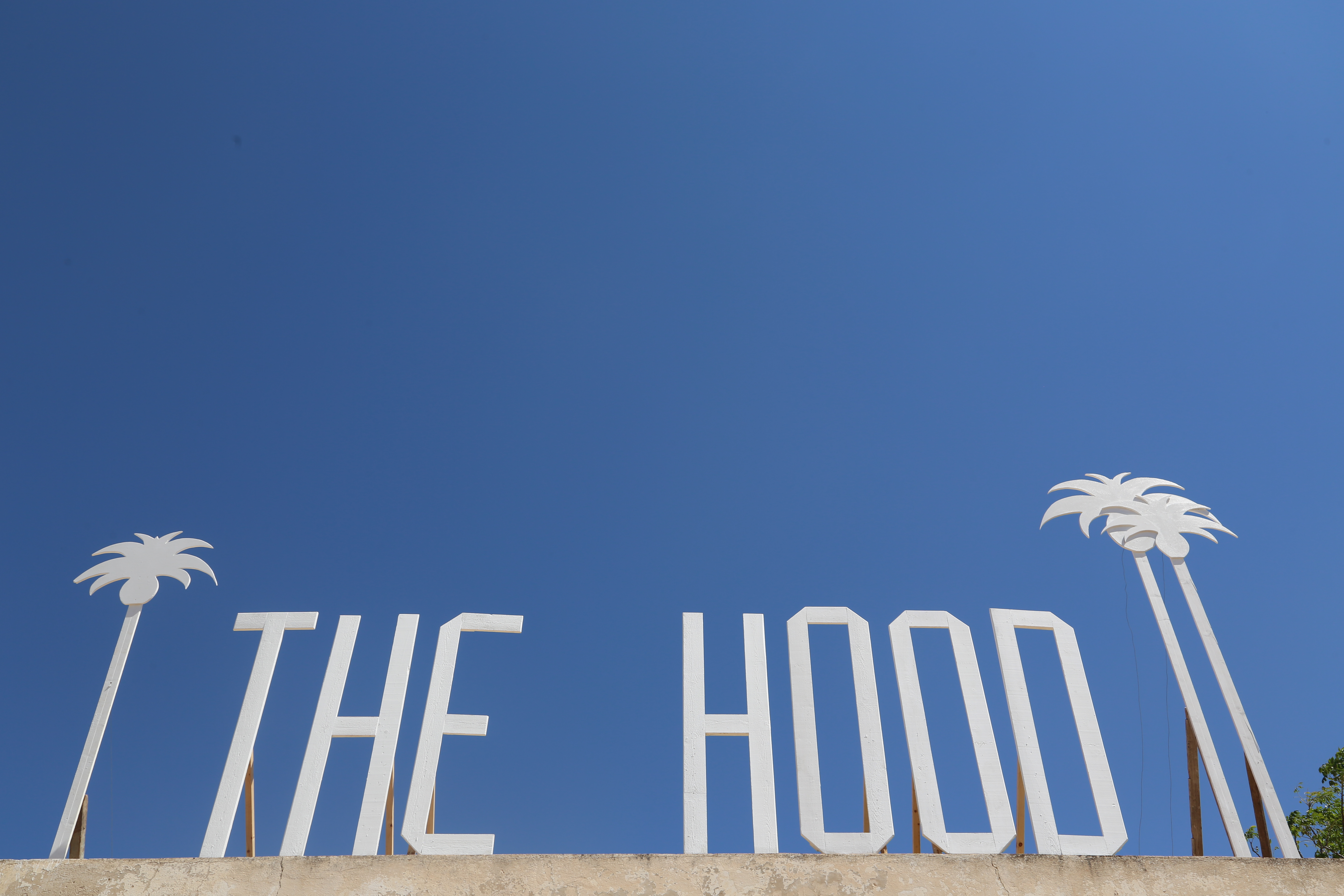
- THE HOOD letters at the entrance of Erriadh quarter
- Established: 2014
- Location: Djerbahood, Erriadh, 4060, Tunisia
- Type: Urban art, open sky, graffiti
- Collection size: 250
- Director: Mehdi Ben Cheikh
- Website: www.djerbahood.com

Djerbahood was a street art event in which artists from all over the world gathered in the village of Erriadh on the Tunisian island Djerba to create 250 mural paintings. The project was established by the Itinerrance de Paris gallery in June 2014.

== The project ==
The name of the project, Djerbahood, was imposed on the organizers by the giant letters THE HOOD installed by Rodolphe Cintorino at the entrance of the village, also known as El Hara Sghira or "the small neighborhood" in Arabic. In order to achieve the 250 individual and collective artistic works, the artists used over 4500 painting sprays during the gathering.

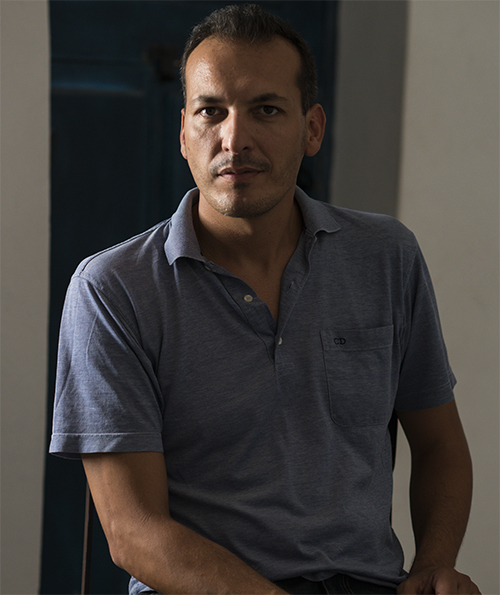
Mehdi Ben Cheikh

According to Mehdi Ben Cheikh, founder of the project and director of Itinerrance de Paris gallery, Djerbahood represents "a unique artistic adventure in the world of urban arts, and an effervescence movement in a developing country". Thanks to the Tunisian phone operator Ooredoo Tunisia, a virtual tour of the village streets is possible and available on the official website of the project.

== The village ==
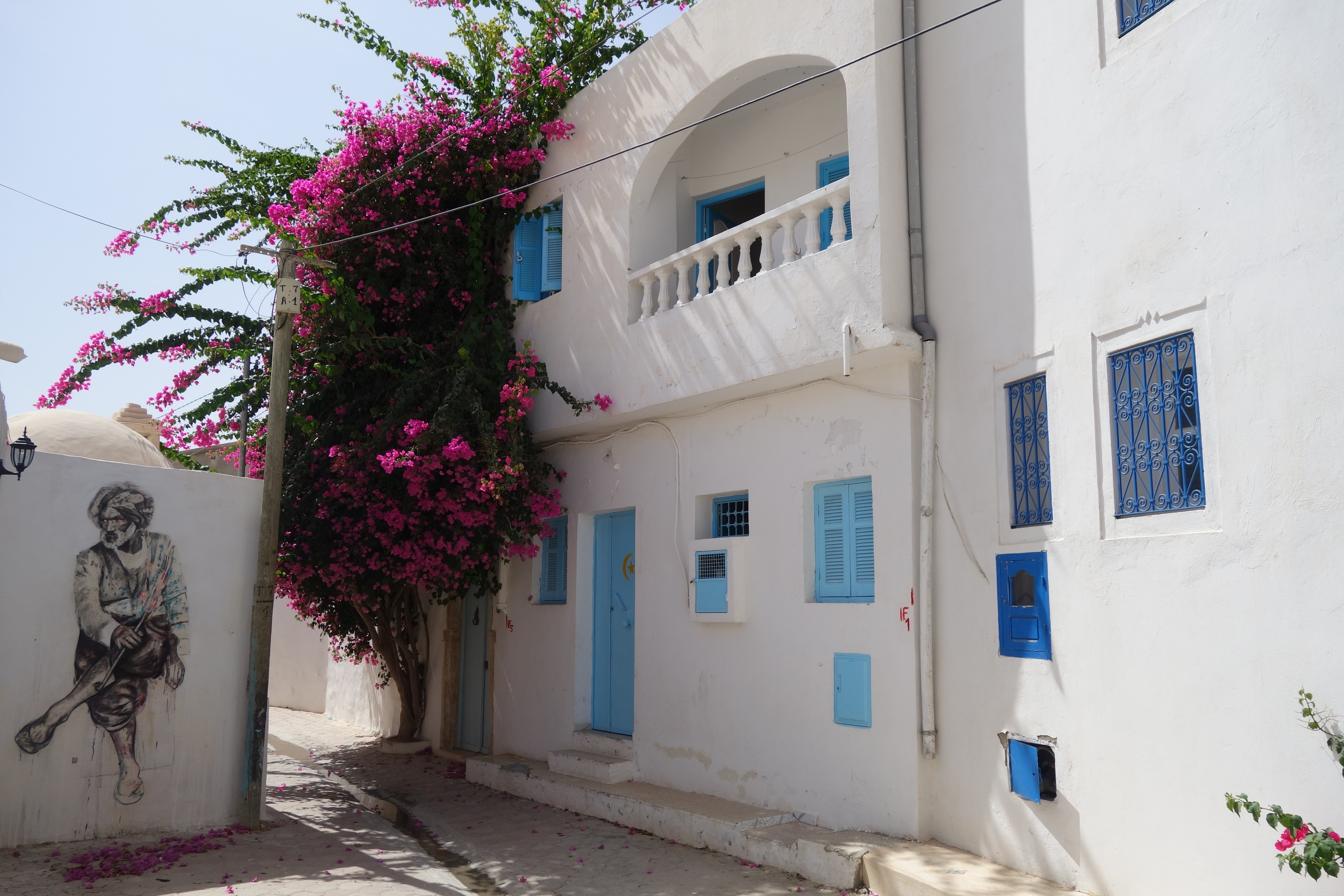
Erriadh quarter

The founders chose Erriadh for its traditional architecture, and thanks to Djerbahood, the village became an attractive destination for tourists. In fact, the whole island, which had suffered from mismanaged garbage collection after the 2011 revolution, gained positive attention thanks to the project. Djerbahood is also a human adventure that led to meetings between artists and locals. All the citizens and merchants of the quarter supported the team for the installations and the material supply. In fact, Mehdi Ben Cheikh had to convince them to "offer" their walls to the artists. And according to him, some of the residents who were reluctant in the beginning later asked the organizing committee and the artists to come and paint on their walls as well.

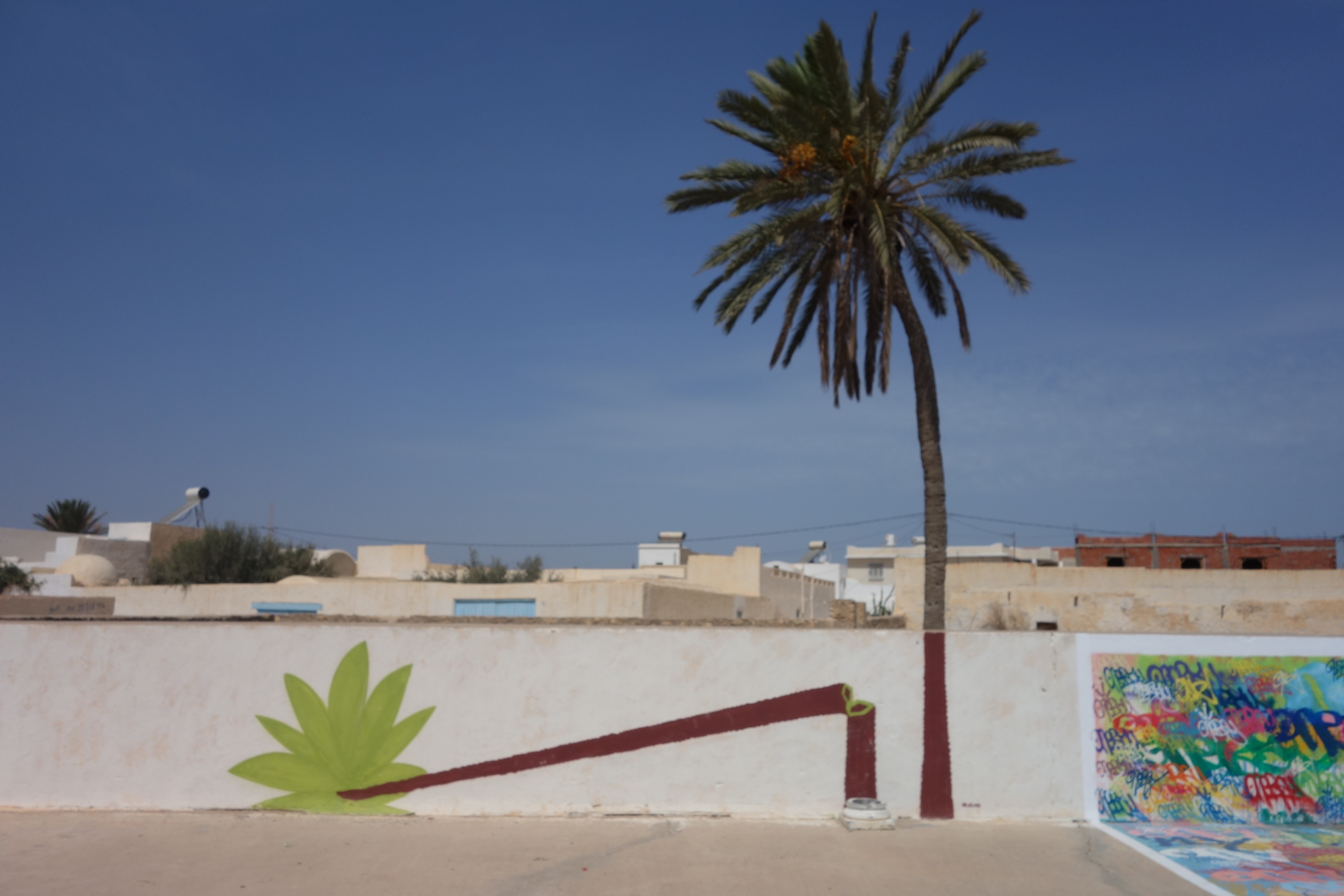

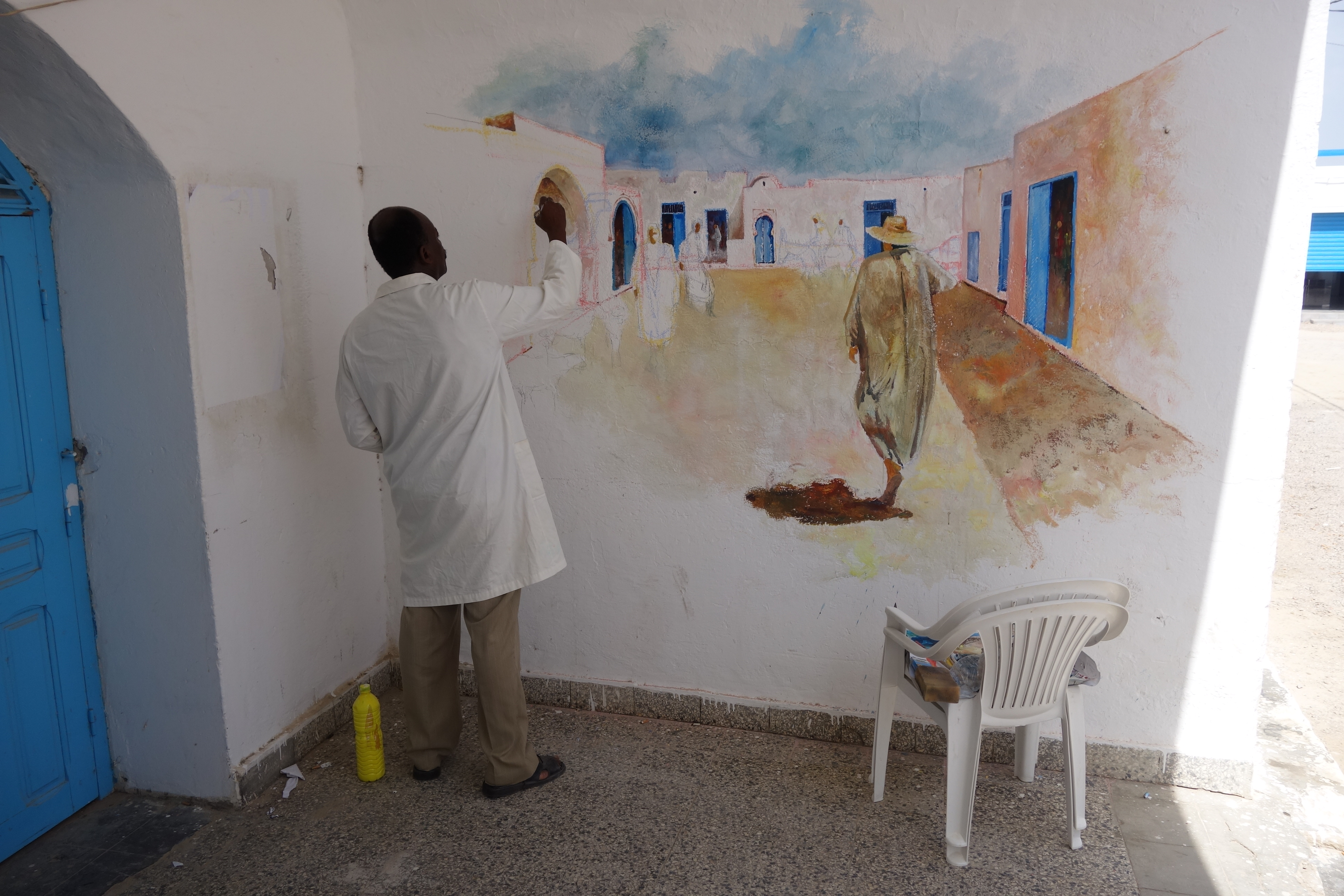

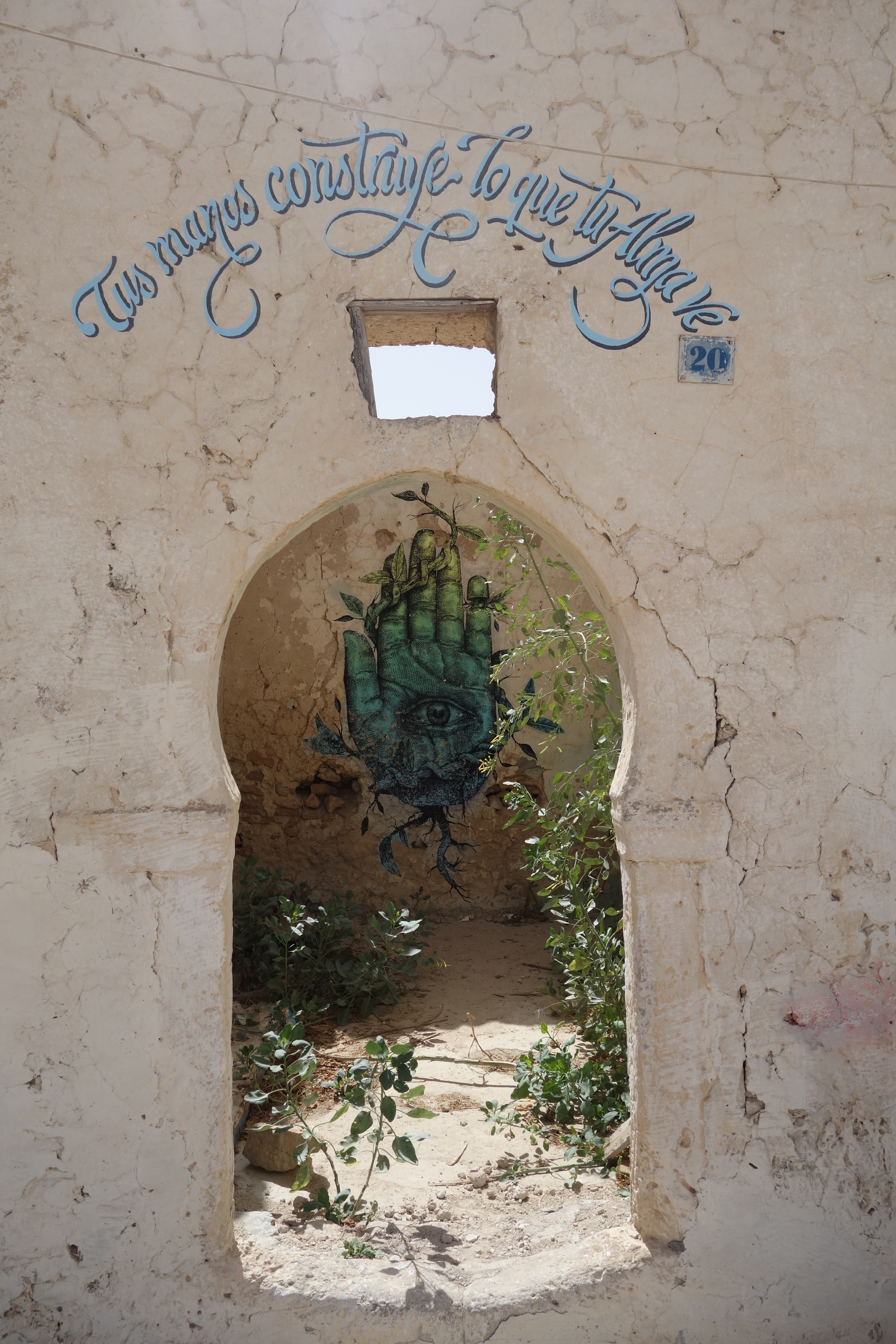

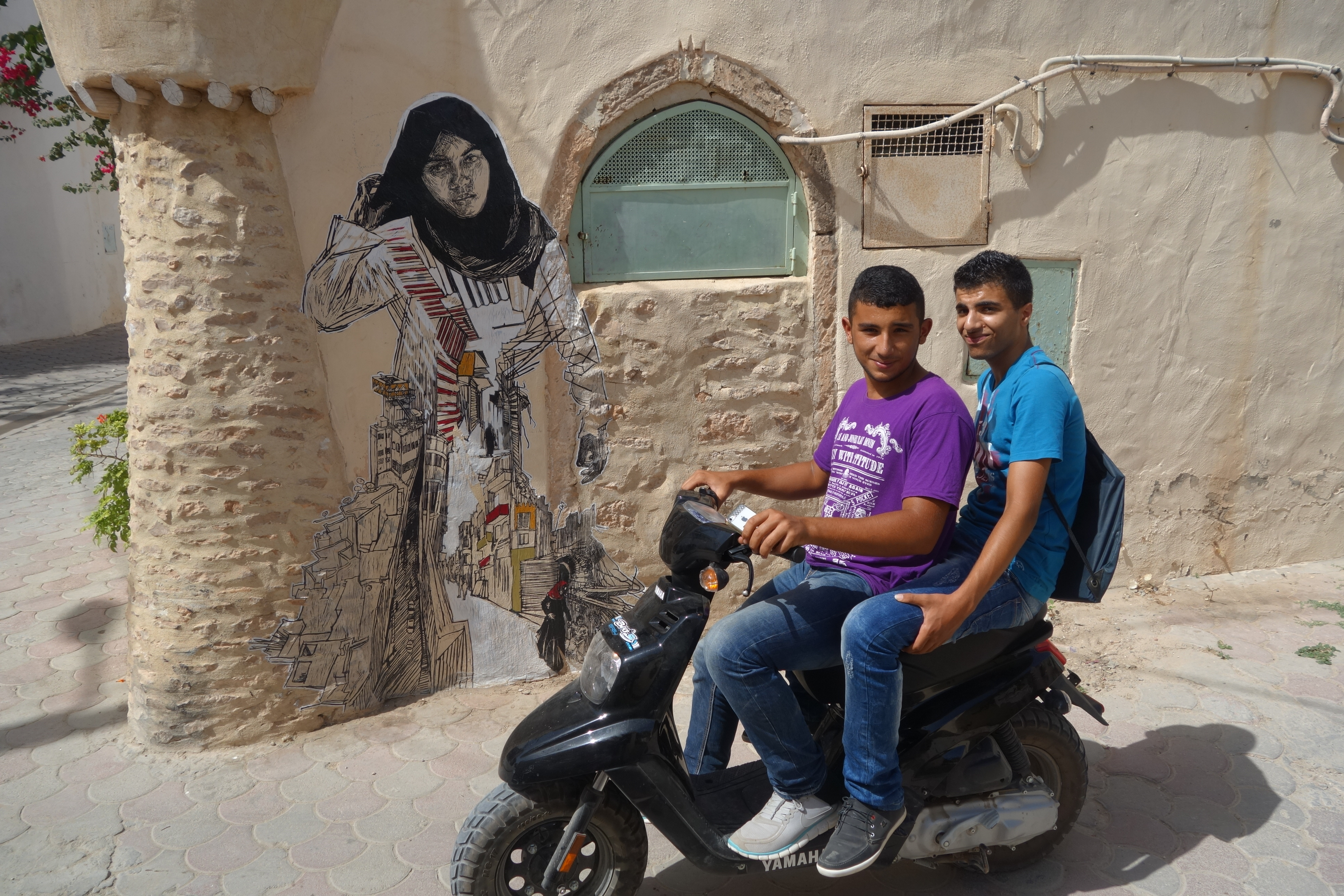

== The artists ==
150 street artists of 30 nationalities participated in the event, including Abbès Boukhobza, Adellatif Moustad, Add Fuel, Alexis Diaz, Amose, Arraiano, Axel Void, Aya Tarek, AZ, Bomk, Brusk, B-Toy, C215, Cekis, Curiot, Dabro, Dan23, David de la Mano, Deyaa, Dome, Elliot Túpac, eL Seed, Elphege, Claudio Ethos, EVOCA1, Faith47, Fintan Magee, Hendrik Beikirch (ecb), Herbert Baglione, Hyuro, Inkman, INTI, Jace, Jasm1, Jaz, Kan, Katre, Know Hope, Kool Koor, Laguna, Liliwenn, Logan Hicks, M-City, Maatoug, Malakkai, Mário Belém, Mazen, Mohamed V, Monica Candilao, Mosko, Myneandyours, Nadhem & Rim, Najah Zarbout, Nebay, Nespoon, Nilko White, Nina, Orticanoodles, Pantónio, Phlegm, Pum Pum, REA, ROA, Rodolphe Cintorino, Salma, Saner, Sean Hart, Sebastián Velasco, Seth (Julien Malland), Shoof, ST4CREW, Stephan Doitschinoff, Stew, Stinkfish, Sunra, Swoon, Tahar Mgadmini, Tinho, Twoone, UNO370, Vajo, WAIS1, Wisetwo, Wisign, Wissem, Yazan Halwani, Sepha, Sied Lasram, 3ZS.

== Media coverage ==
The event had a large press coverage with hundreds of articles from 70 countries in just few months, e.g. The New York Times, The Guardian, Le Monde, Libération, The Huffington Post, La Repubblica, Vogue Italia, Al Jazeera, BBC News, Le Mouv' and France Inter.

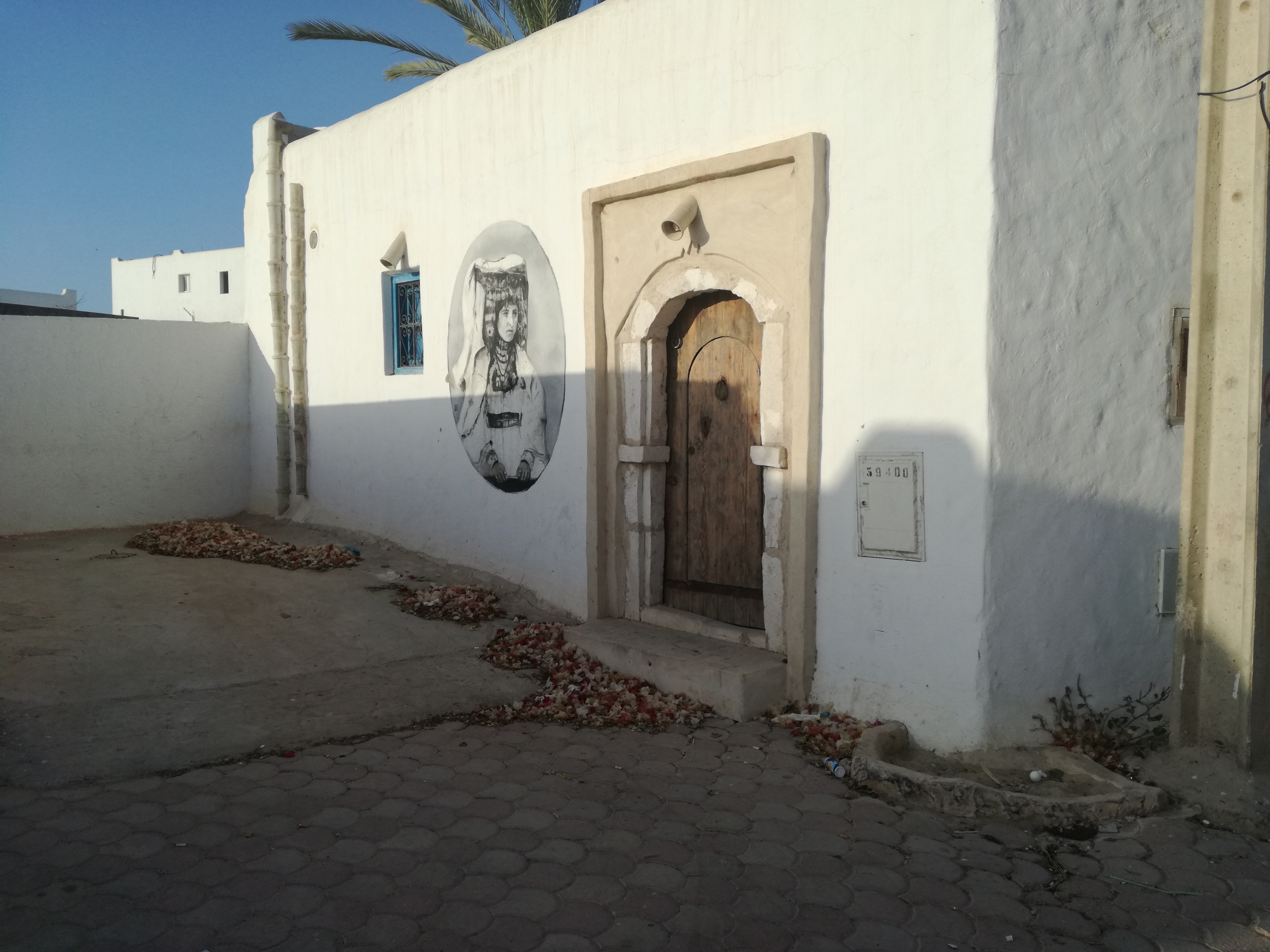
Djerbahood

A documentary web series of ten episodes was made and shared on the Creative ARTE platform showing backstage scenes with the artists.

== Gallery ==
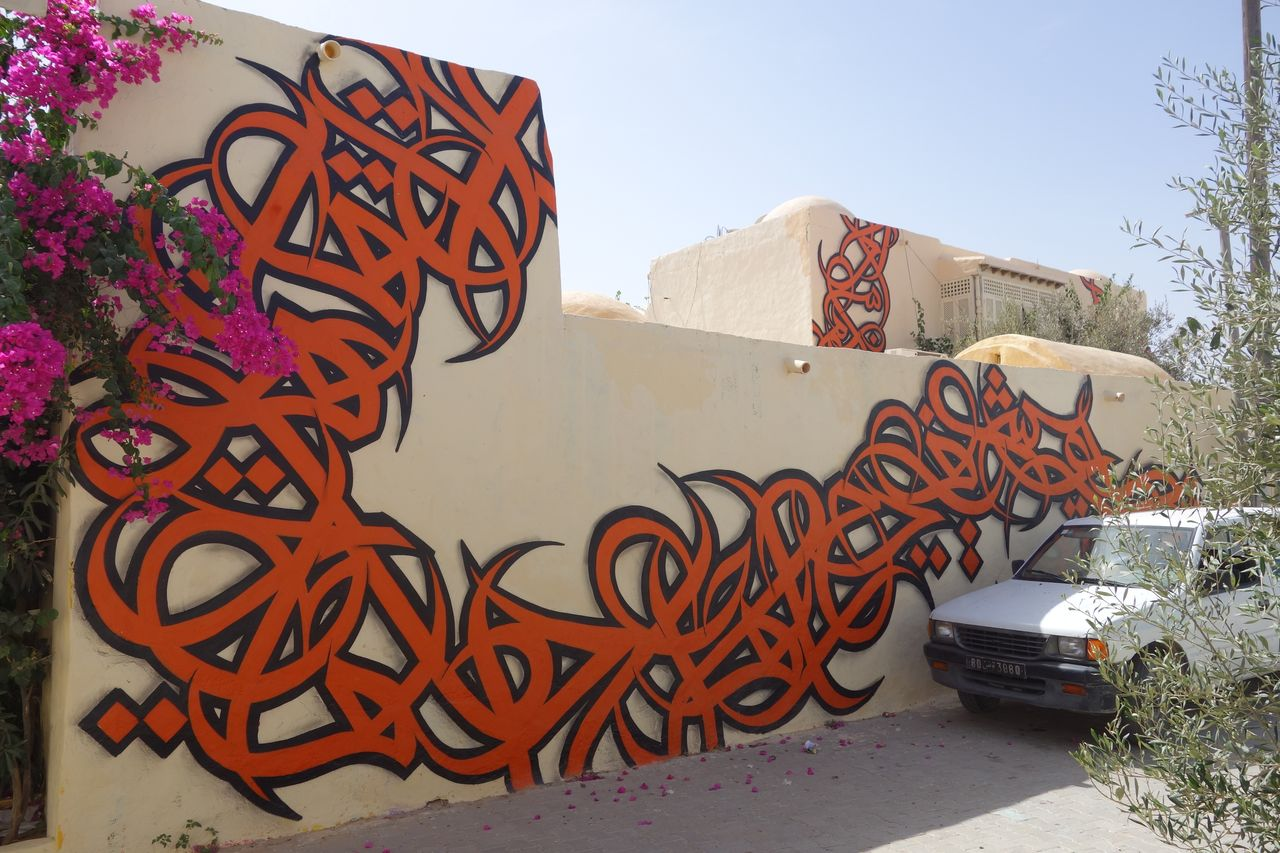

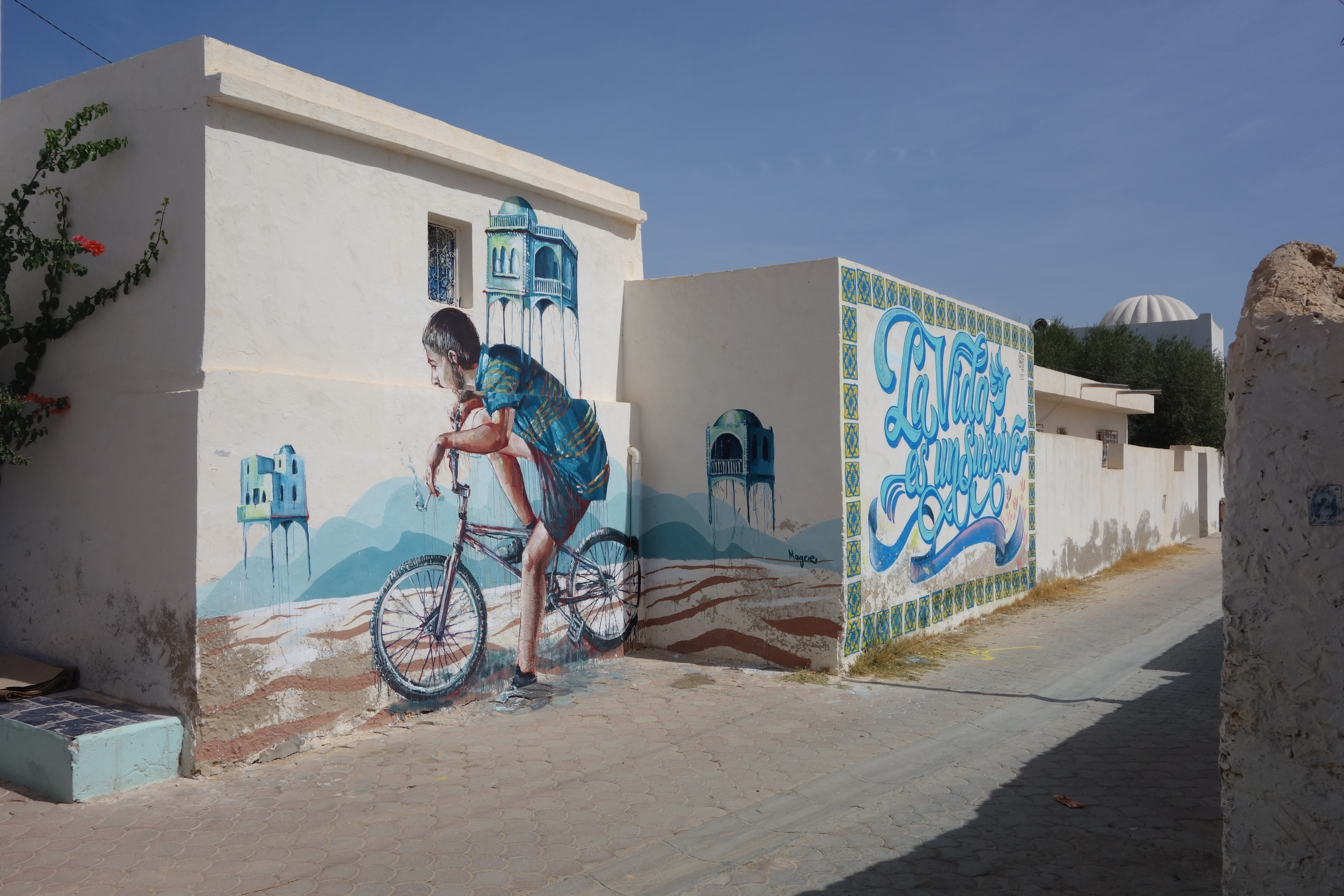

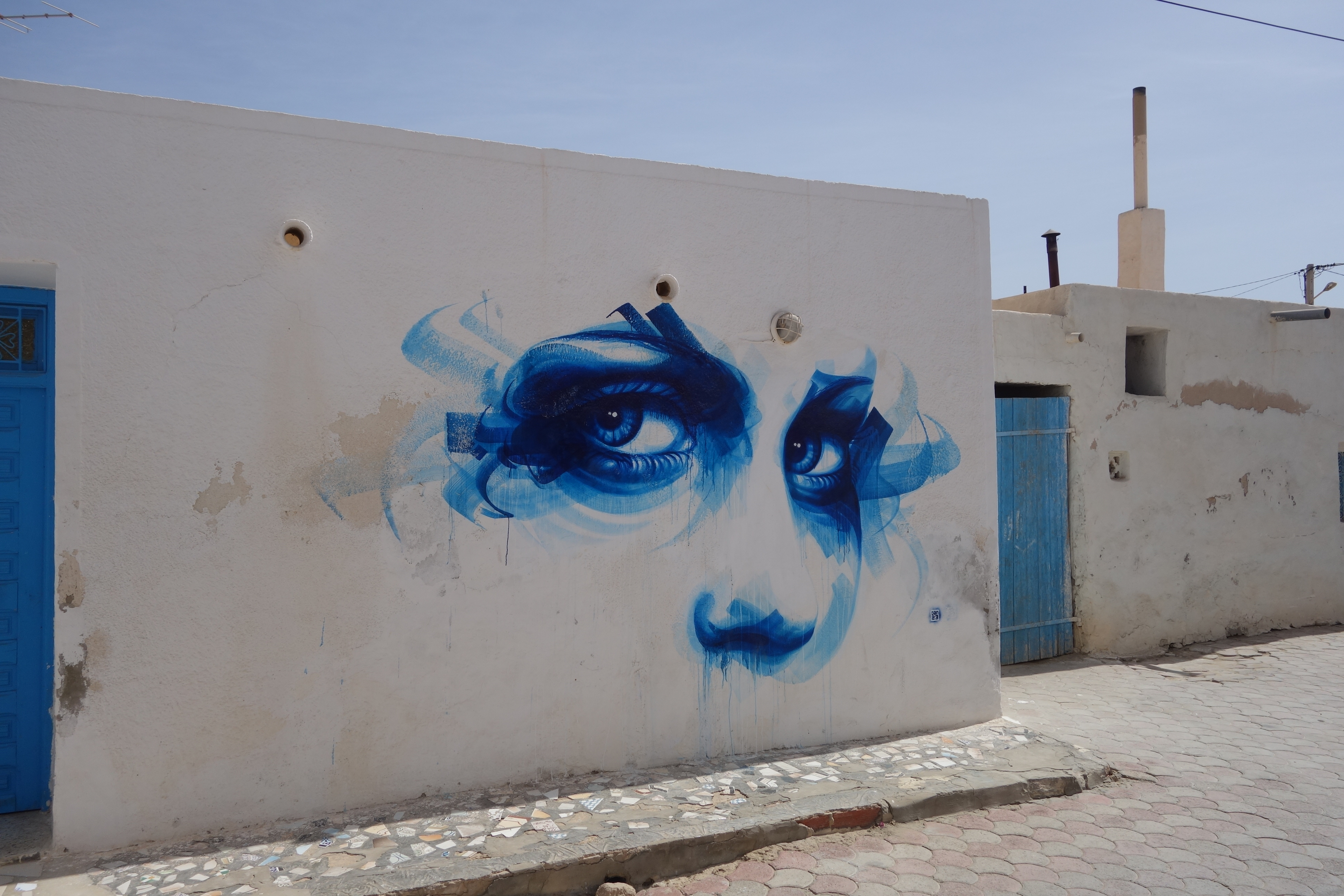

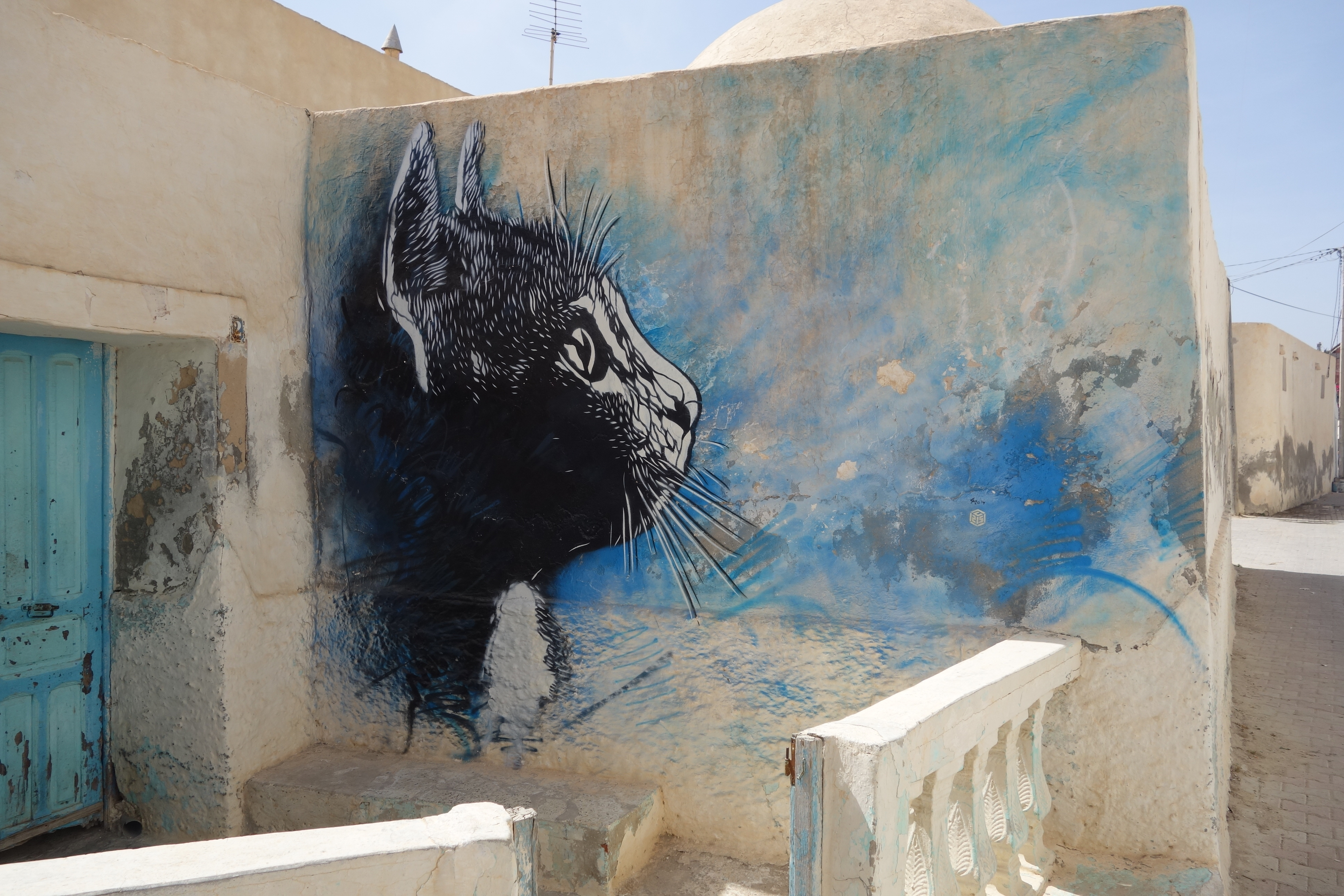

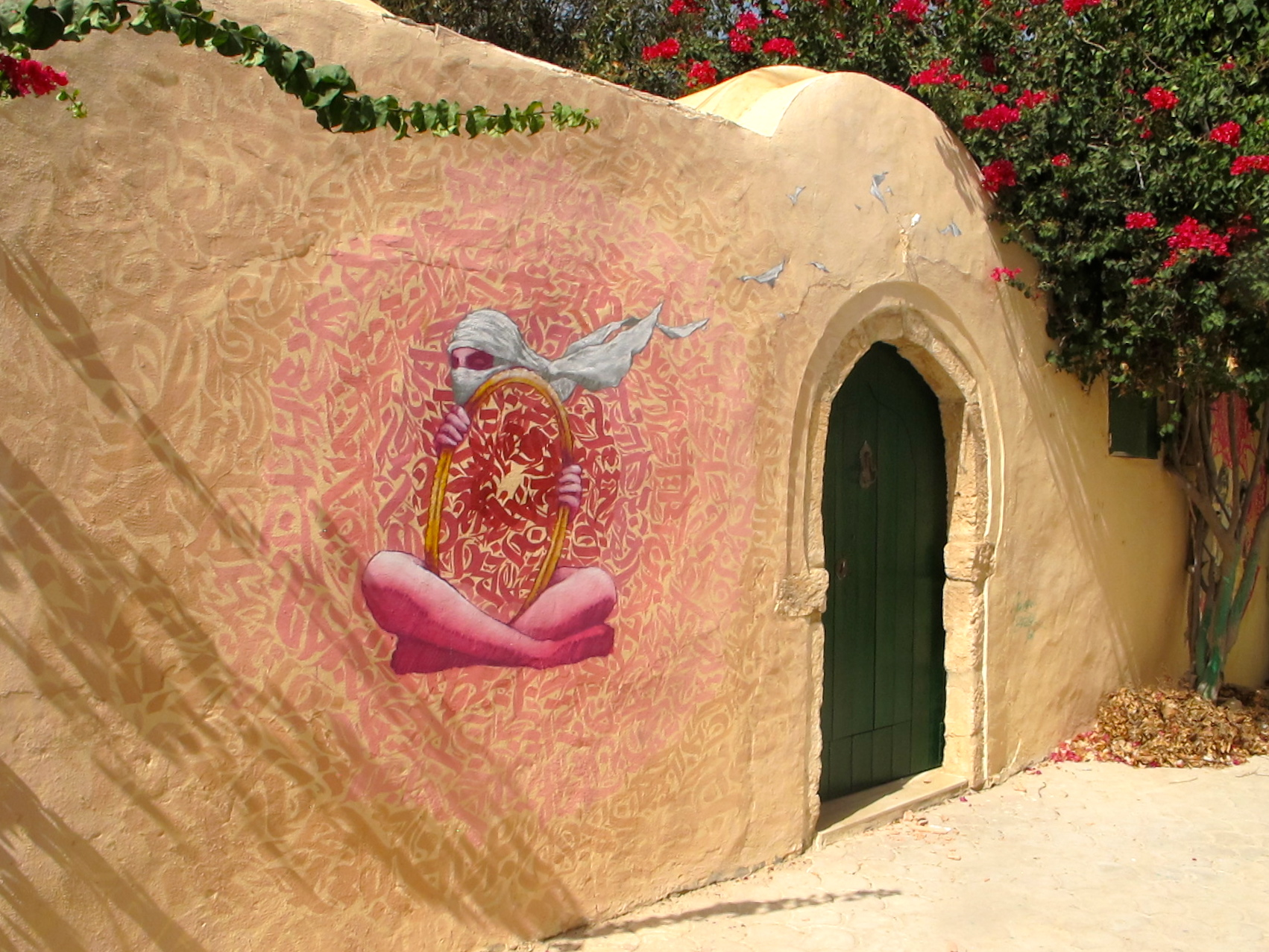

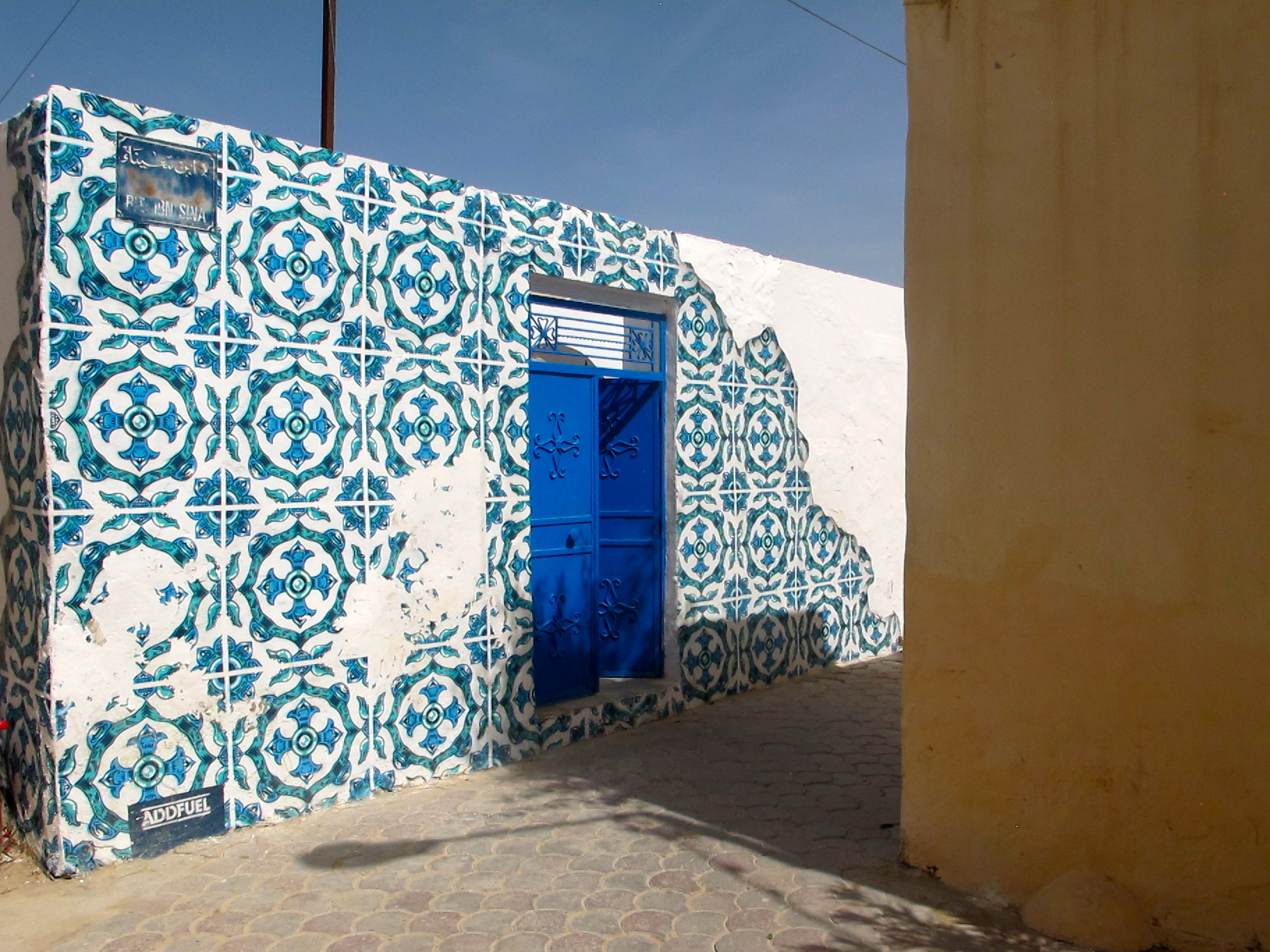

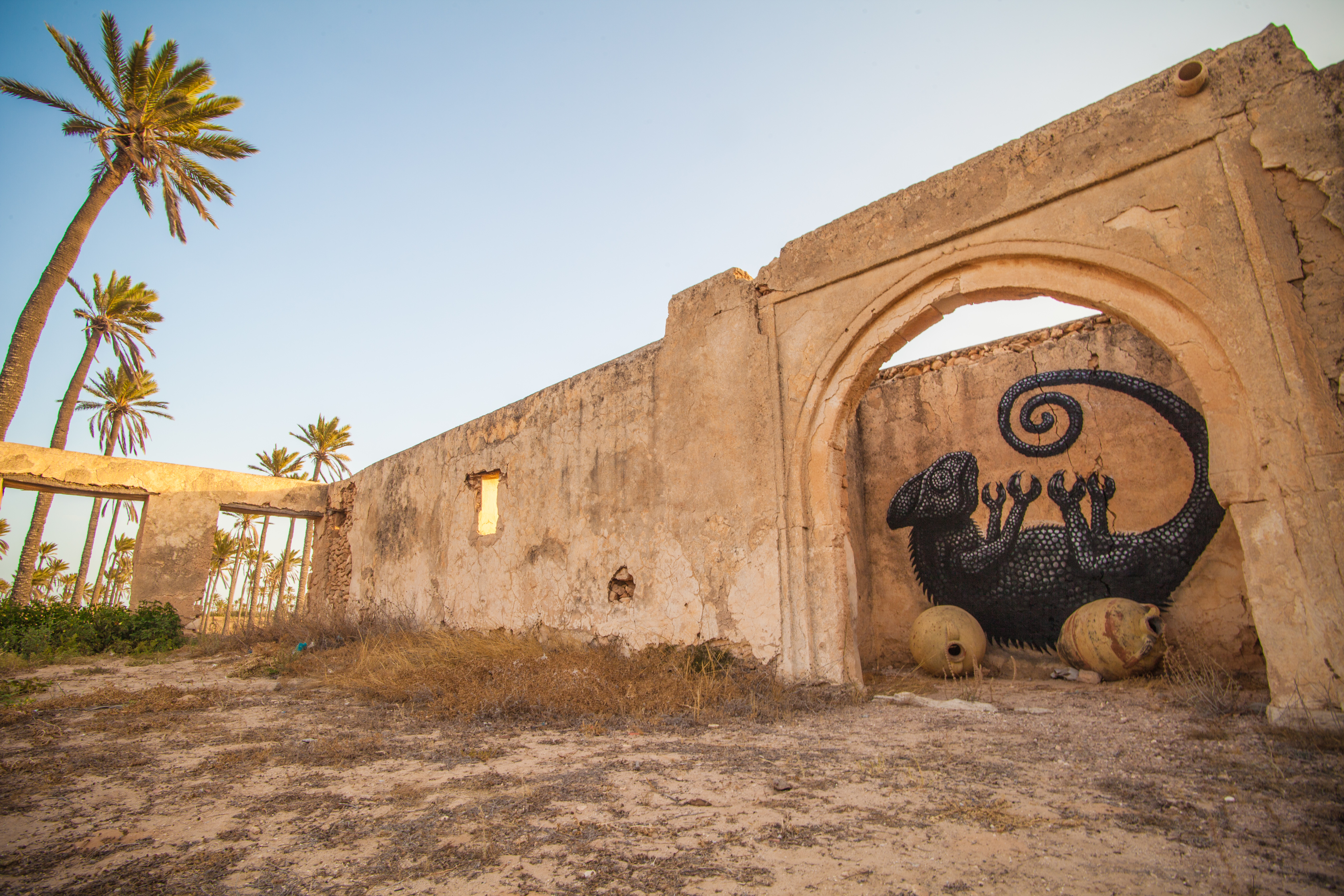

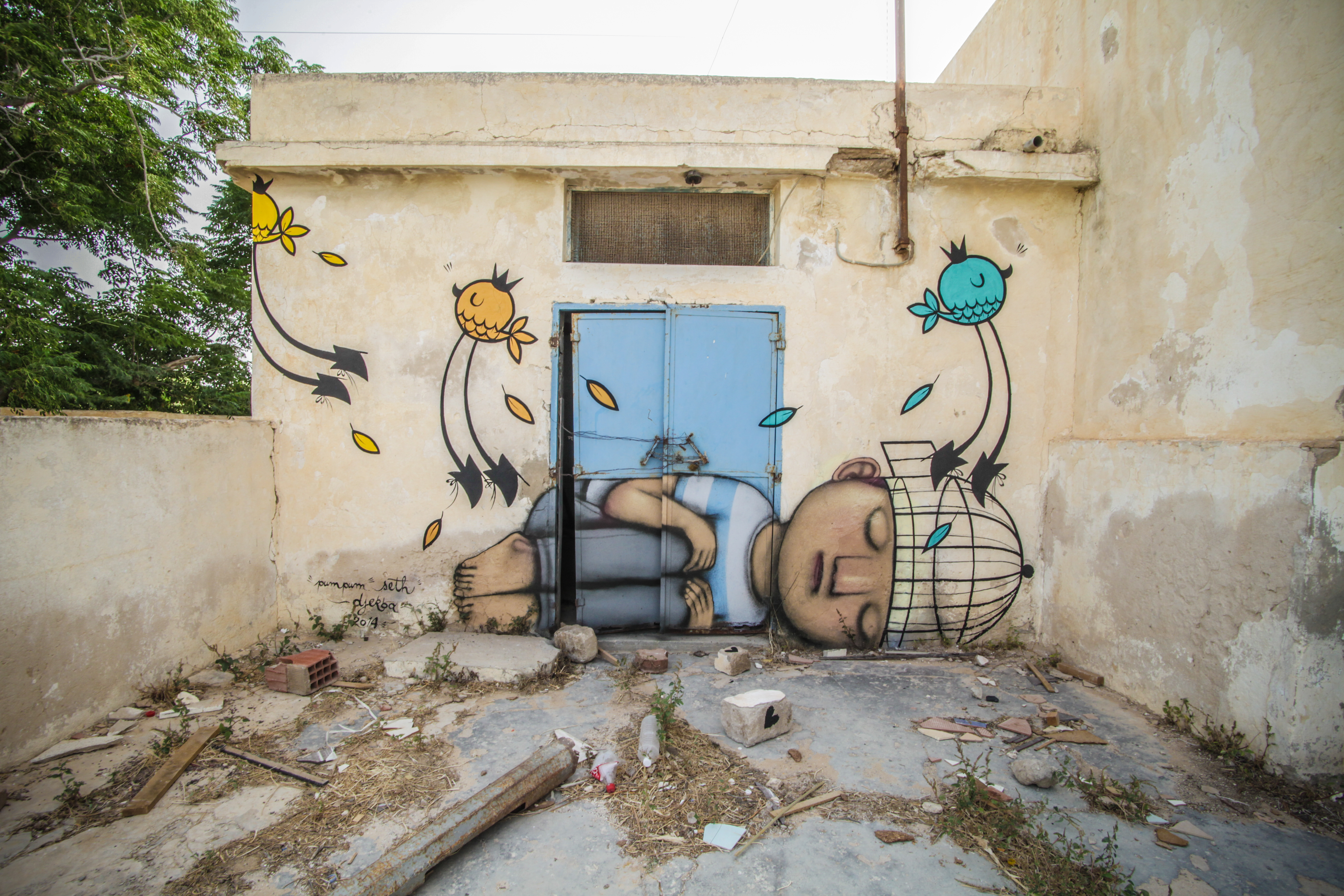
