= Yazan Halwani =

Lebanese artist and activist from Beirut

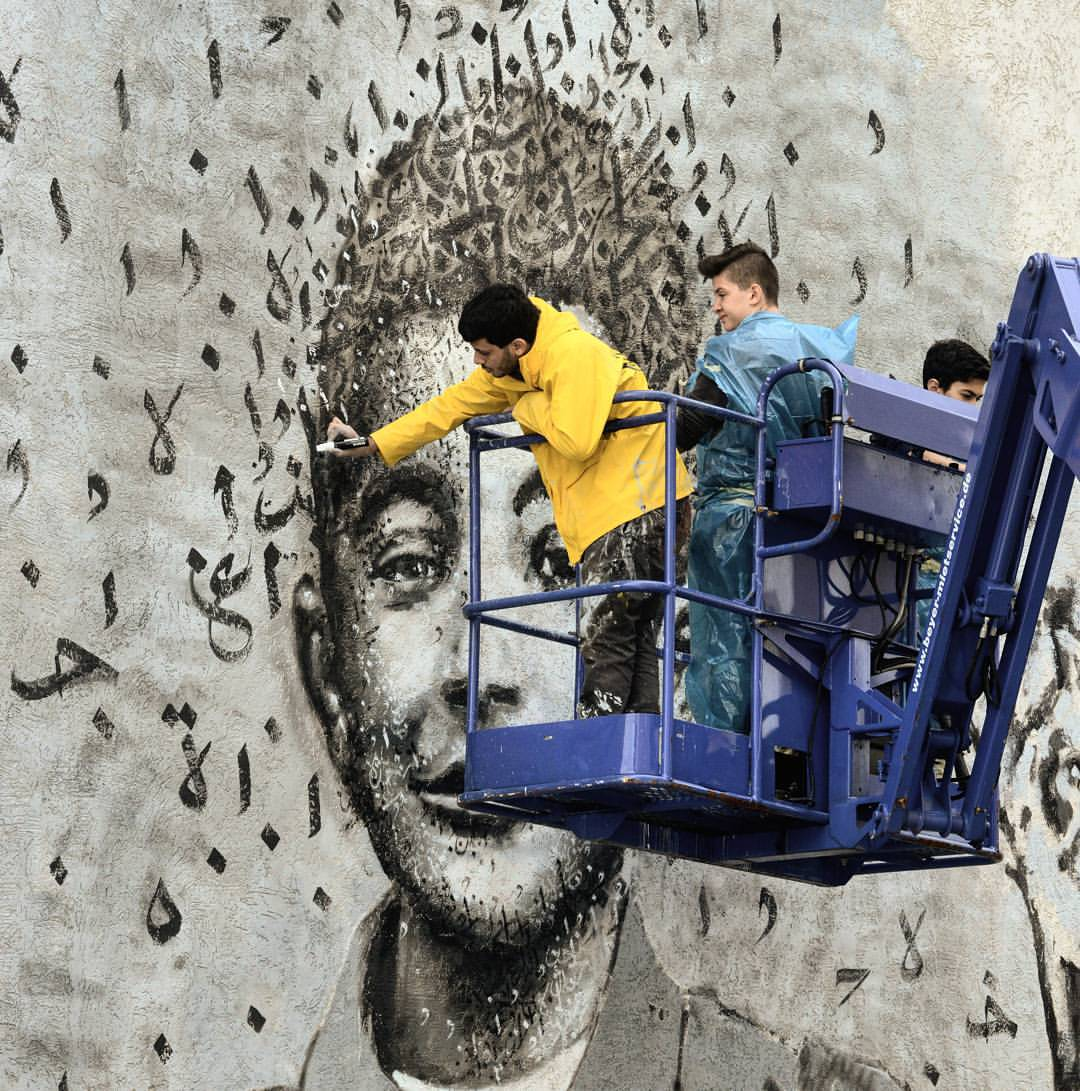

Yazan Halwani (Arabic: يزن حلواني) is a Lebanese artist from Beirut. Yazan is best known for his public art displays, including graffiti, murals, and sculptures. His murals can be found on buildings across Beirut, and often depict portraits of important Lebanese and Middle Eastern figures.

Halwani, a graduate of American University of Beirut and Harvard Business School, started painting to protest against Lebanon's traditionally-sectarian politics and the Lebanese Civil War (1975-1990). His art celebrates Lebanon's unique cultural heritage and the creation of a unified national identity of secularism. Yazan's most recognizable work is the Eternal Sabah mural in Beirut's Hamra neighborhood, portraying the famous Lebanese singer and artist, Sabah.

== Artwork and style ==
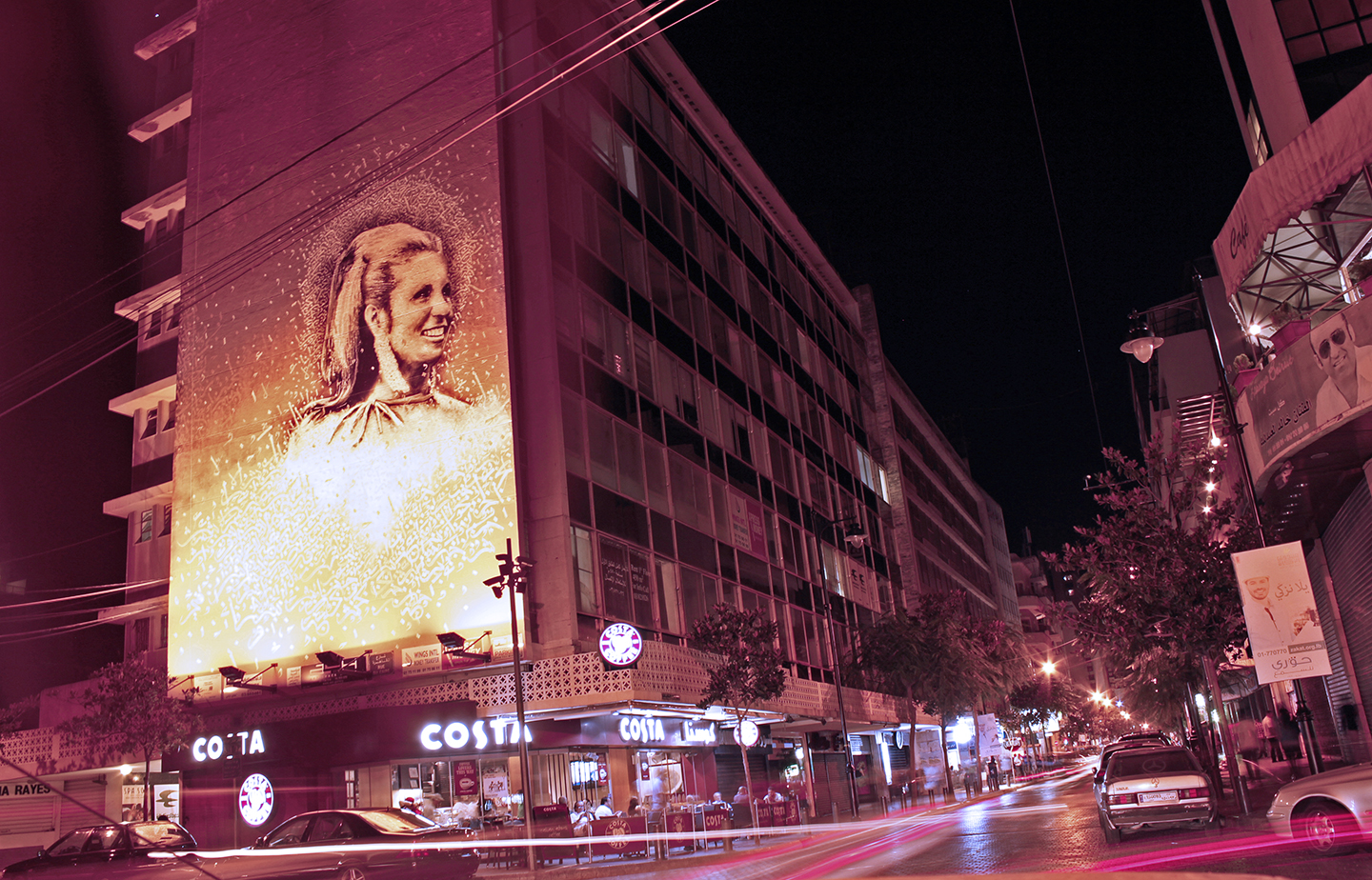
Eternal Sabah Mural by Yazan Halwani on Assaf building in Hamra, Beirut

In 2007, Yazan started experimenting with graffiti benefiting from the loose regulation towards graffiti in Beirut. In 2011, Yazan decided to change his style and create a mural style that is independent of the west, by leveraging Arabic calligraphy and portraits of Arab people. He frequently reports that his shift in style was accompanied by a shift in attitude: "Graffiti has a strong connotation of vandalism, but in my city most people do vandalism: Lebanese Civil War, corrupt politicians. This is why I try to make my murals a constructive expression of the city."

Yazan's calligraffiti style uses Arabic letters to form intricate, modern and stylized Arabic calligraphy compositions that are an essential element of his art work. His calligraphy does not focus on the meaning of the words but on their shape, movement, or the composition: traditional Arabic calligraphy for him has always been formed by the meaning of the words (usually excerpts from the Koran, poems, or sayings) and the shape of the calligraphy; Yazan challenges tradition by removing the meaning of the words to focus solely on the task of the calligrapher. Hence his calligraphy is used as a "pixel" for a portrait, a way to note music, or a way to show movement.

Yazan was initially influenced by the western hip hop and graffiti scene from the US and Europe. But living in the Middle-East, he soon turned his attention to Middle Eastern art and Arabic calligraphy through an Arabic calligraphy book that his uncle shared with him. Yazan subsequently evolved his style to paint images, words and letters that have an oriental touch and inspiration. Another distinctive element of Yazan's art is the focus on portraits as a central element within a mural or a painting In addition to his murals, the artist has recently started installing sculptures made of cement on the street.

Yazan's murals are characterized by their size, themes and portraits that include portraits of Arab and Lebanese artists, cultural icons, and faces of Arabs.

His biggest murals is a full building painted with the portrait of Lebanese singer Sabah at the heart of Hamra, Beirut, on a building that housed before the Lebanese Civil War the Horseshoe cafe, a popular hangout for Arab artists and writers such as Paul Guiragossian, Nizar Qabbani and Mahmoud Darwish. Another mural in Germany that attracted international attention was entitled "The Flower Salesman" which depicts a Syrian child called Fares that used to sell flowers in Beirut and died during the Syrian Civil War.

== Exhibitions ==
- Huna/k, Dortmund (Germany), September 2015
- UrbanArt Biennale 2015, Saarbrücken (Germany), March–November 2015
- 32Bis, Tunis (Tunisia), June 2015
- “Du Bronx aux Rues Arabes” at the Institut du Monde Arab, Paris (France), April- July 2015
- Horouf Art Exhibition, Dubai (United Arab Emirates), February 2015
- Djerbahood Open Air Museum, Djerba (Tunisia), August 2014
- Singapore Art Fair, Singapore (Singapore), November 2014
- Liquid Art House, Boston (USA), May 2014
- Courtyard Gallery, Dubai (United Arab Emirates), March- April 2014
