= ROA (artist) =

Belgian street artist

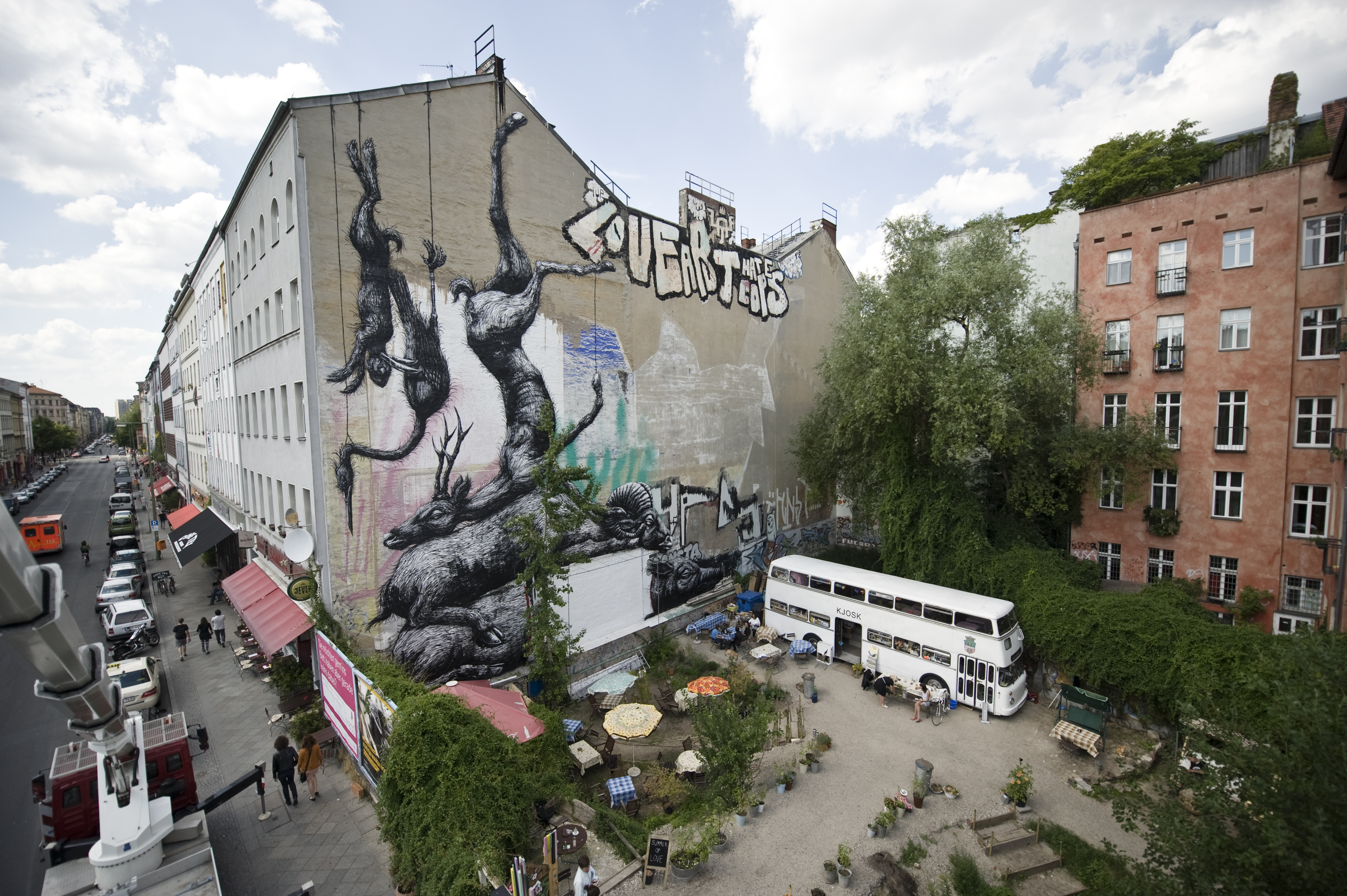
ROA Mural in Berlin-Kreuzberg. Painted in 2011 in the Range of his Exhibition: "Transit", at the Skalitzers Gallery.

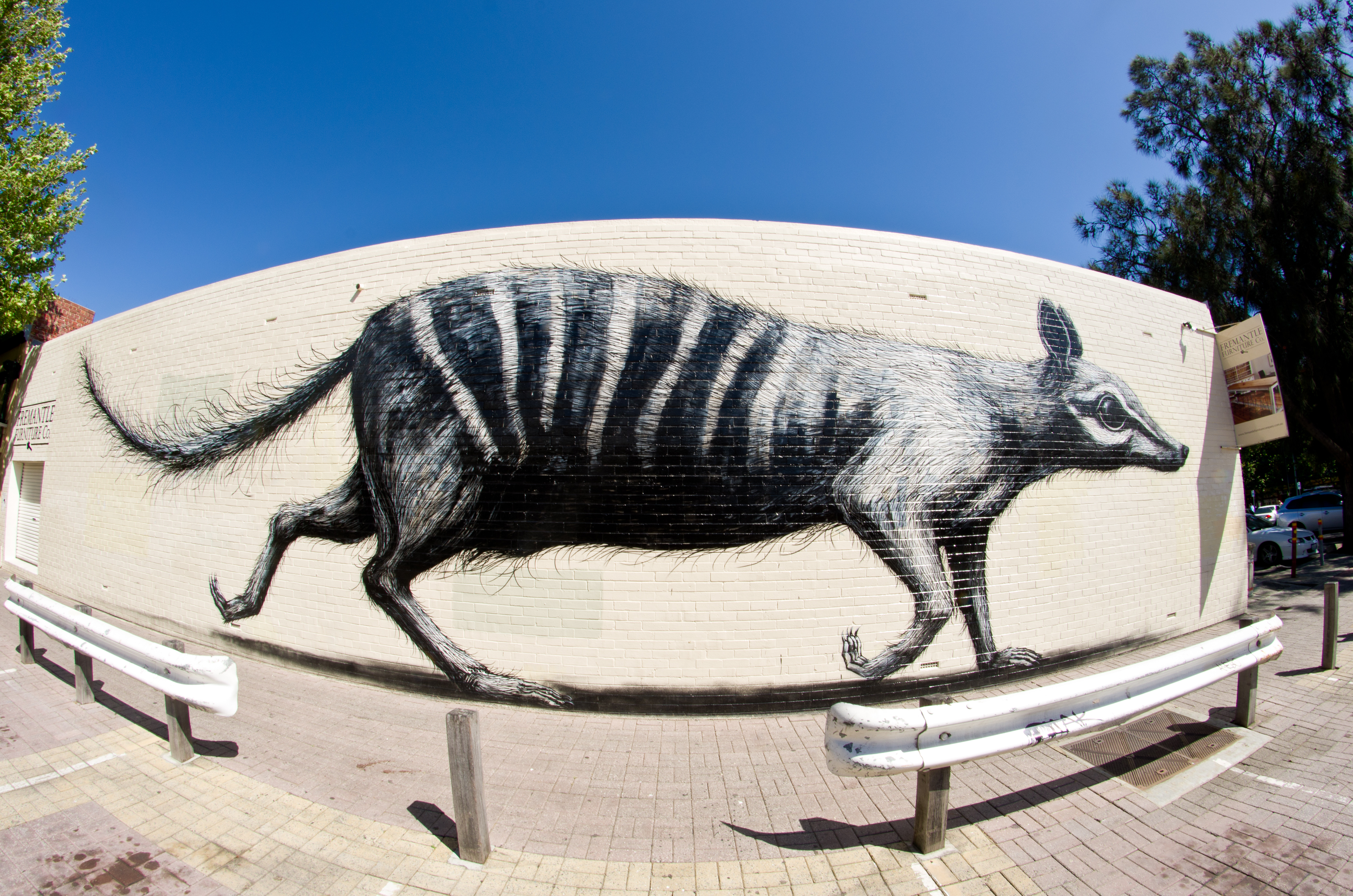
ROA's numbat in Fremantle

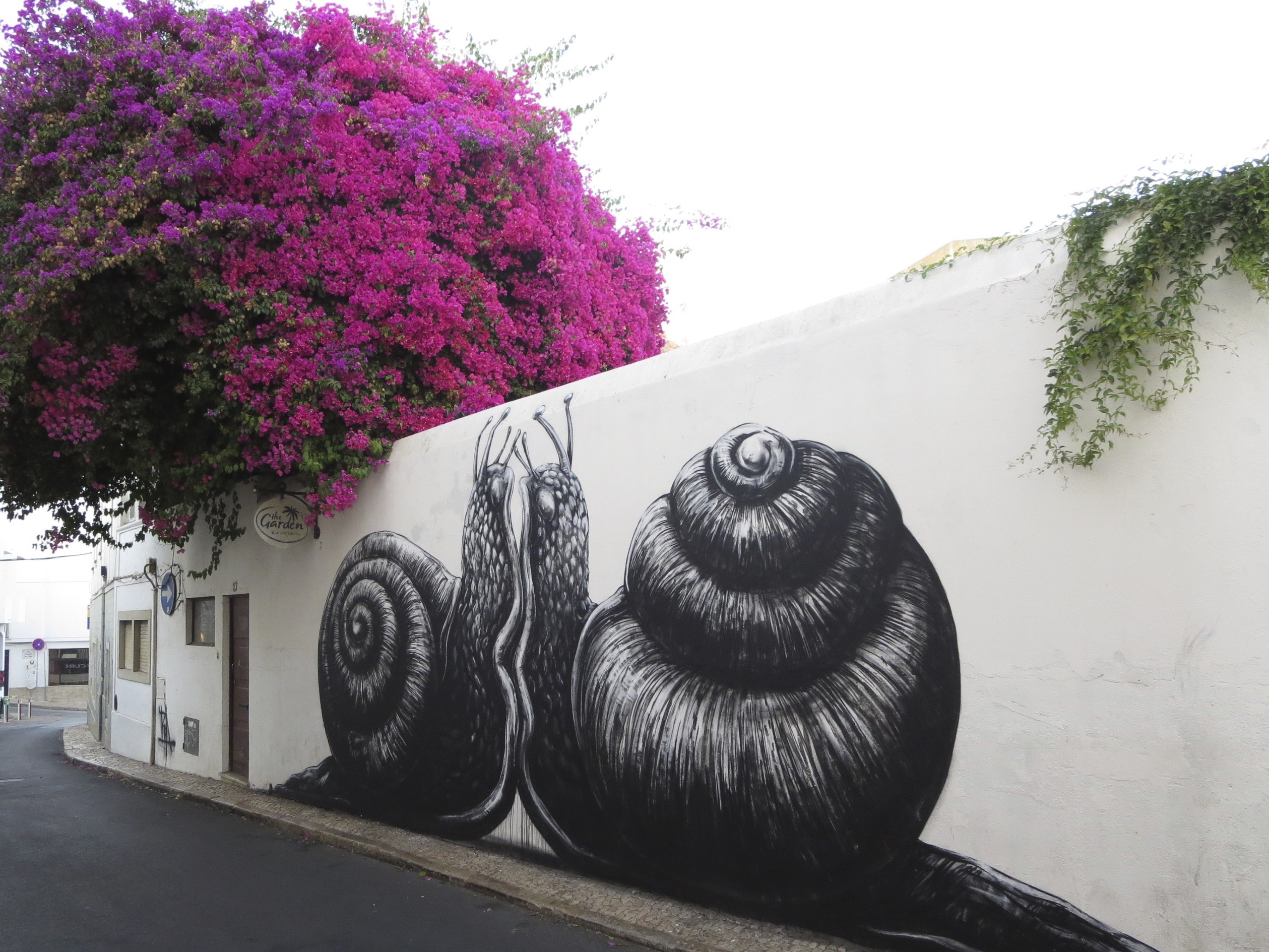
Snails, Lagos, Portugal

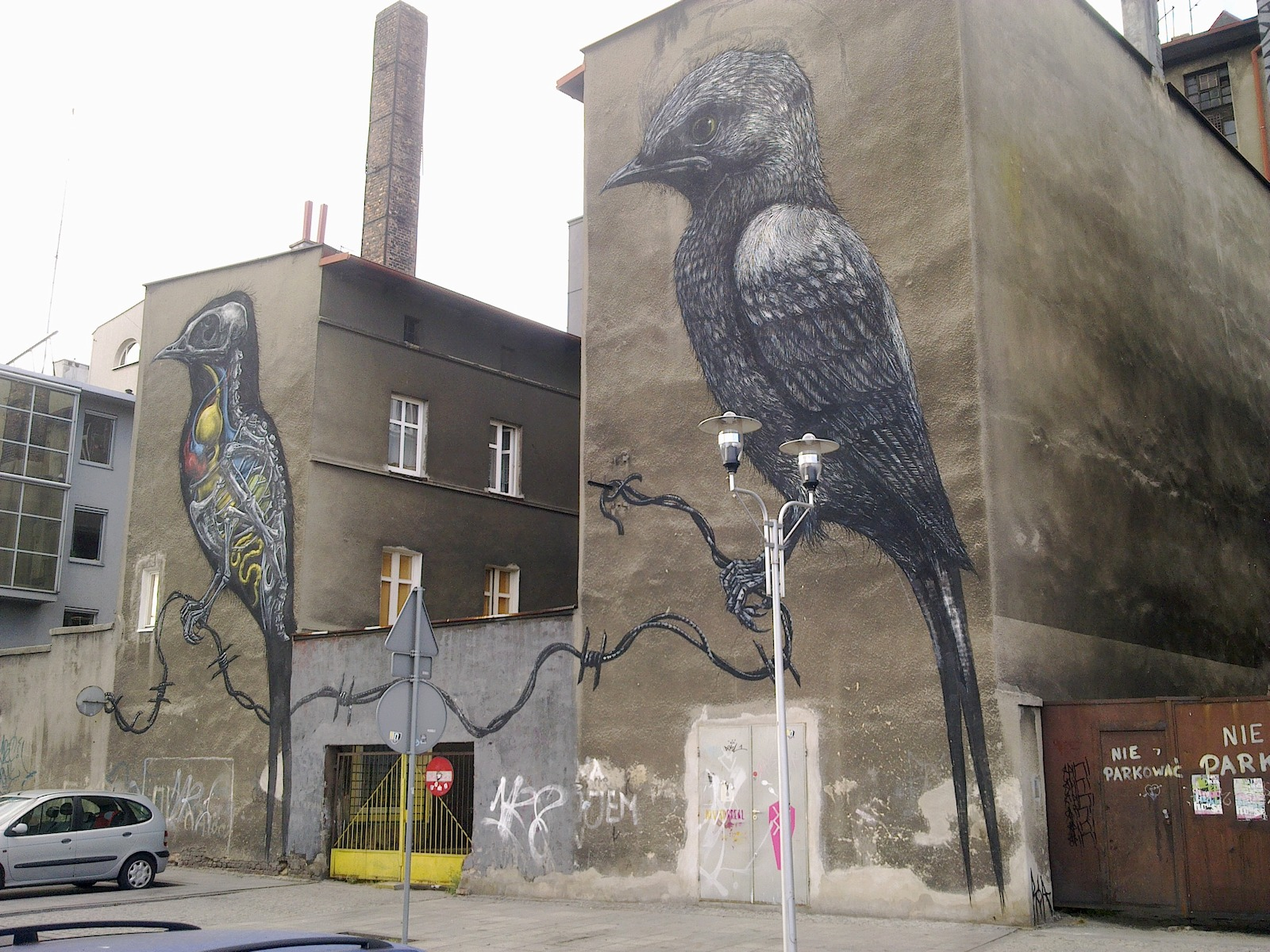
Artwork depicting birds in Katowice, Poland

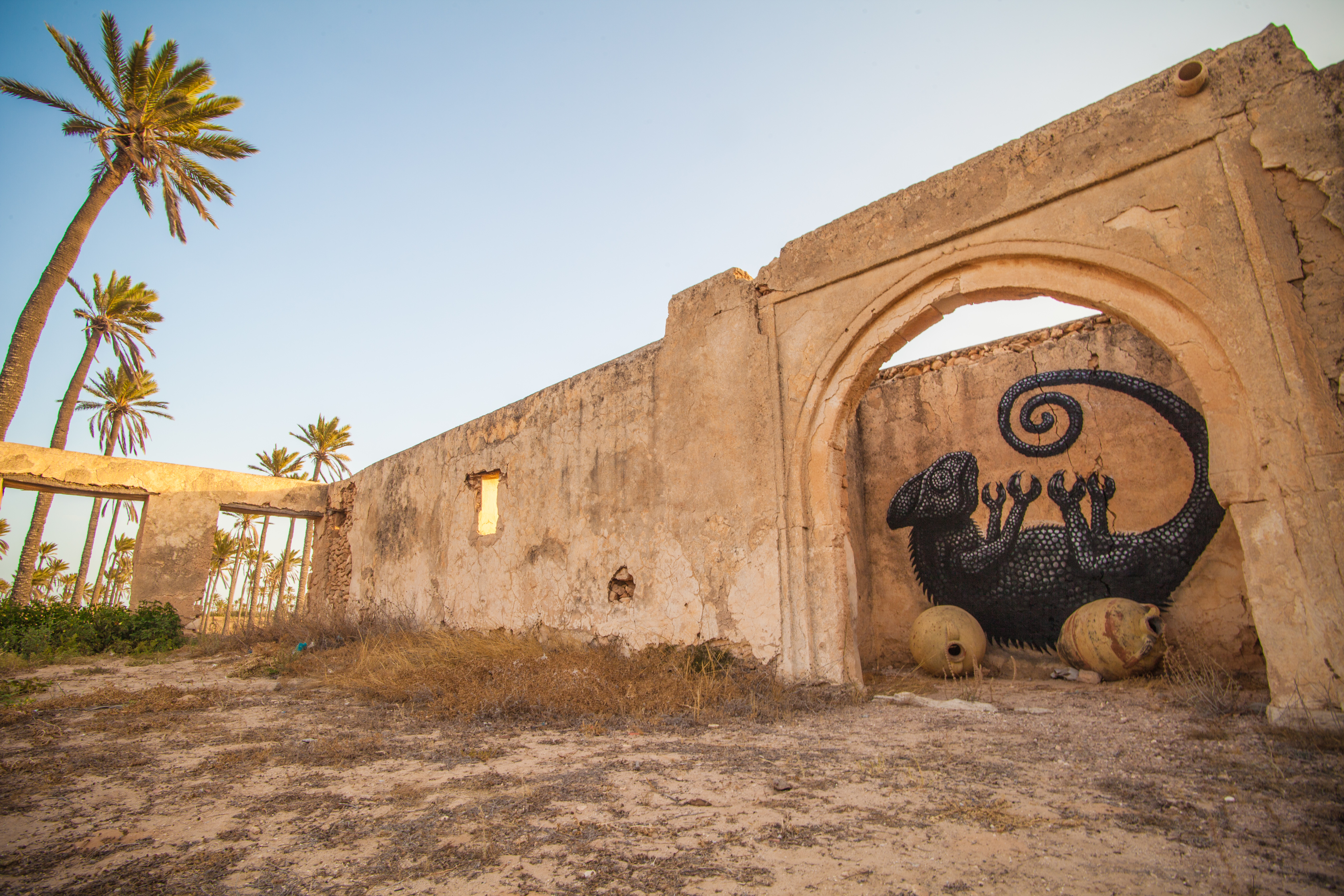
Chameleon in Djerbahood, Tunisia

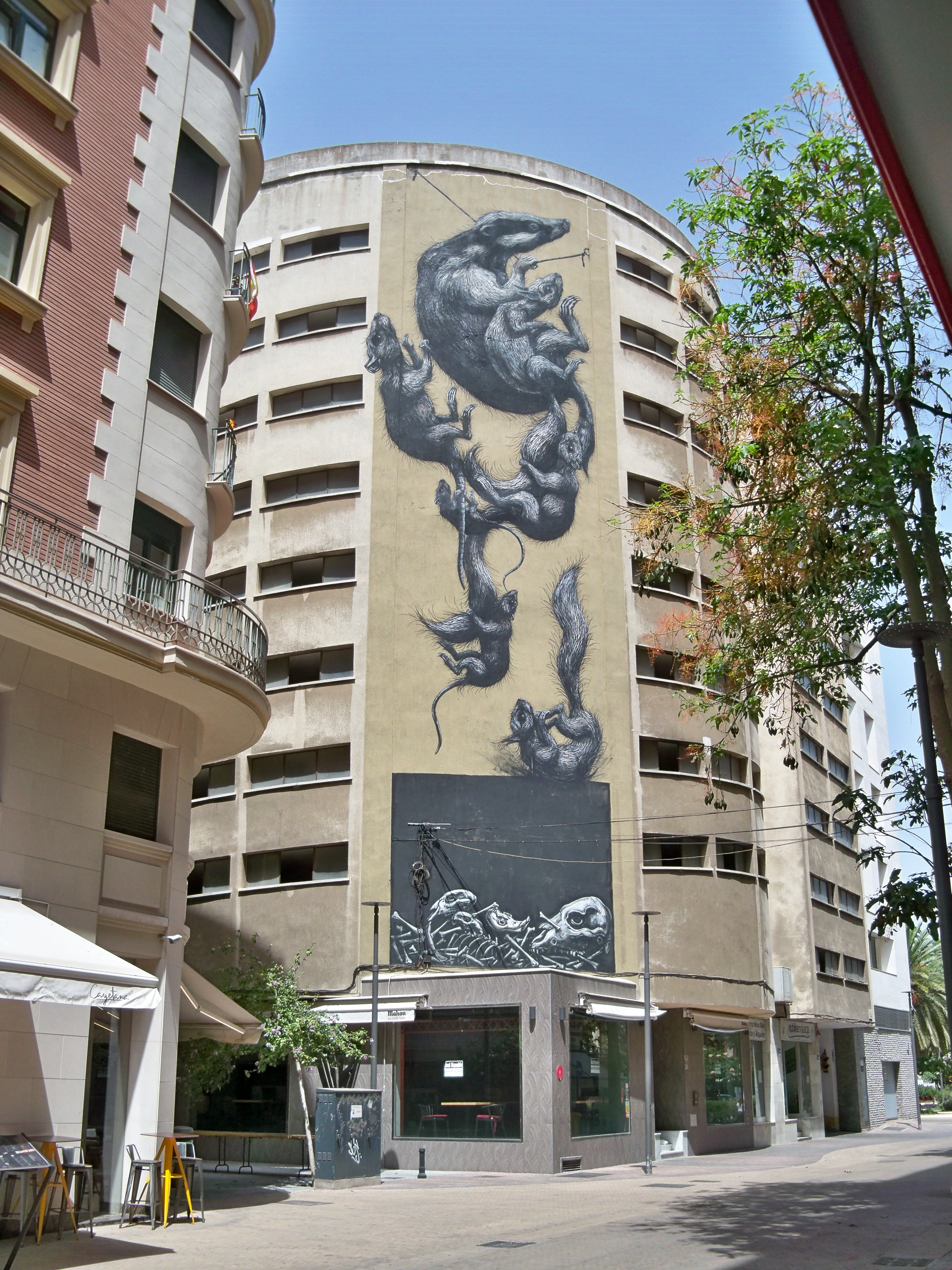
Mural by ROA (2013) in Málaga, Spain.

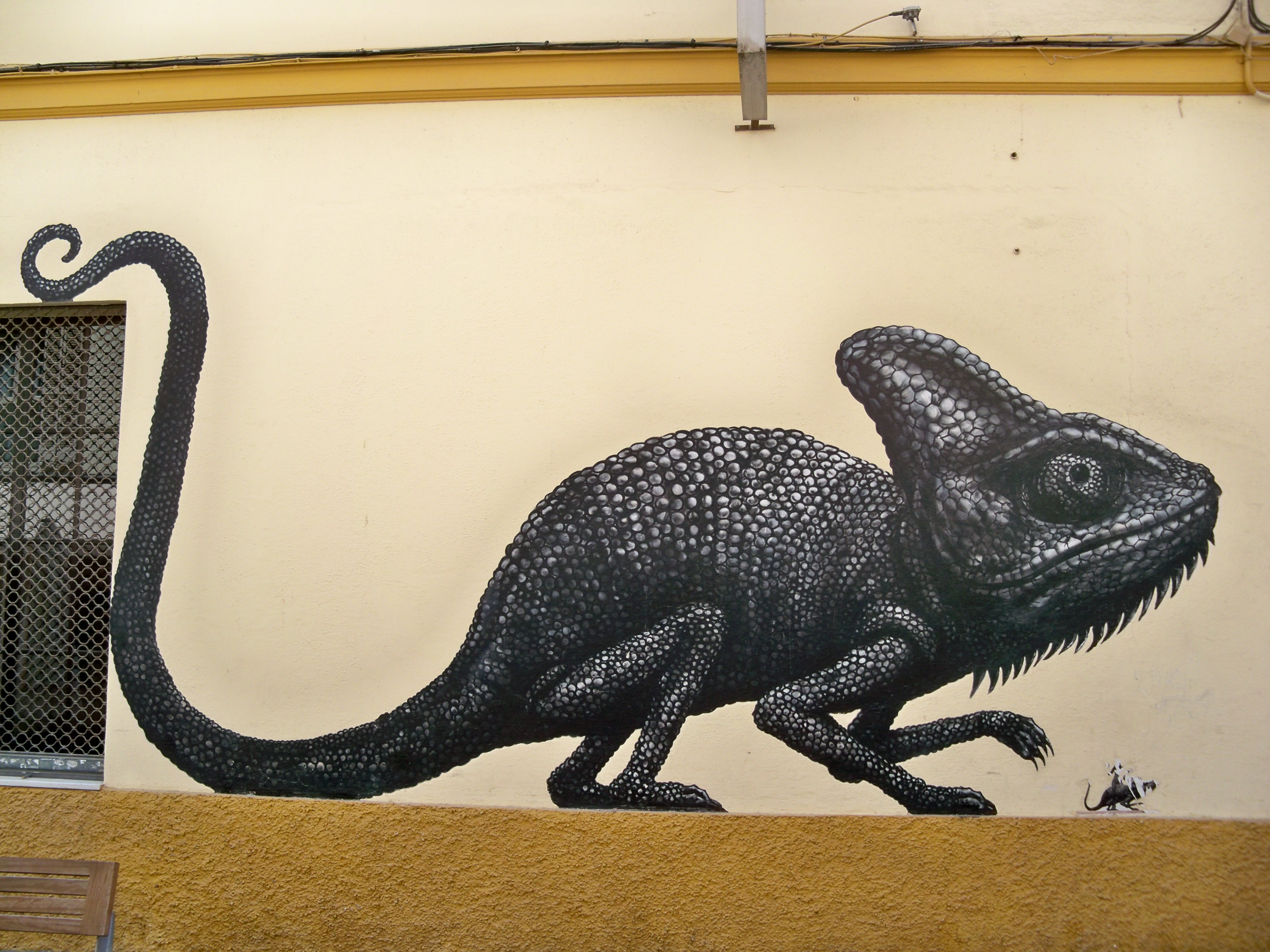
Chameleon by ROA (2013) in Málaga, Spain.

ROA (born c. 1976) is a graffiti and street artist from Ghent, Belgium. He has created works on the streets of cities across Europe, the United States, Australia, Asia, New Zealand and Africa. ROA generally paints wild or urban animals and birds that are native to the area being painted. ROA usually uses a minimal color palette, such as black and white, but also creates works using vibrant colours depicting the flesh or internal systems within the animals and birds.

"ROA treats each surface he paints like a space to investigate, play with, and fit his creatures into. The technical perfection of his painting belies an underlying resourcefulness with simple tools,” “The animals are matched to their location, with rats in New York City and elephants in Bangkok. There are dark and funny messages, the beauty of both life and death, universal metaphors, inside jokes, and occasional violence, but always in ways that honor the animals and the spaces where they are painted."

A monograph, ROA - CODEX published in 2019 by Lannoo with text contributions by Lucy Lippard, Robert Williams and others, looks at Roa's work on four continents.

== Notable works by continent ==
=== Africa ===
In 2014, ROA contributed with several mural paintings in the Djerbahood project on the Tunisian island Djerba.

=== Europe ===
In 2010, ROA painted a large bird on the side of an Indian restaurant at the intersection of Hanbury Street and Brick Lane in Tower Hamlets, London. He originally intended on it being a heron, but changed it to a crane after learning that cranes are sacred to the Bengali community.

In 2011 ROA came to particular notice in the UK when Hackney council threatened to paint over one of his paintings, a 3.5 m high rabbit. The rabbit had been legally painted on the wall of The Premises Studios in Hackney Road, London. A campaign was launched to keep the mural, by the building's owners and local residents, forcing the council to change its mind.

In 2010, ROA participated in the Cologne CityLeaks Festival and painted a mural in Ehrenfeld at Senefelderstrasse 5

In August 2012 ROA took part in the See No Evil street art festival in Bristol, England, creating a two-storey high fox on the side of a building.

In 2013, ROA participated in the MAUS project in Málaga, which aimed to provide Soho, a district of the city known as "The Arts District", with a valuable legacy in contemporary cultural heritage. ROA created two artworks in this district, a graffiti of a chameleon and a mural depicting rodents trying to escape.

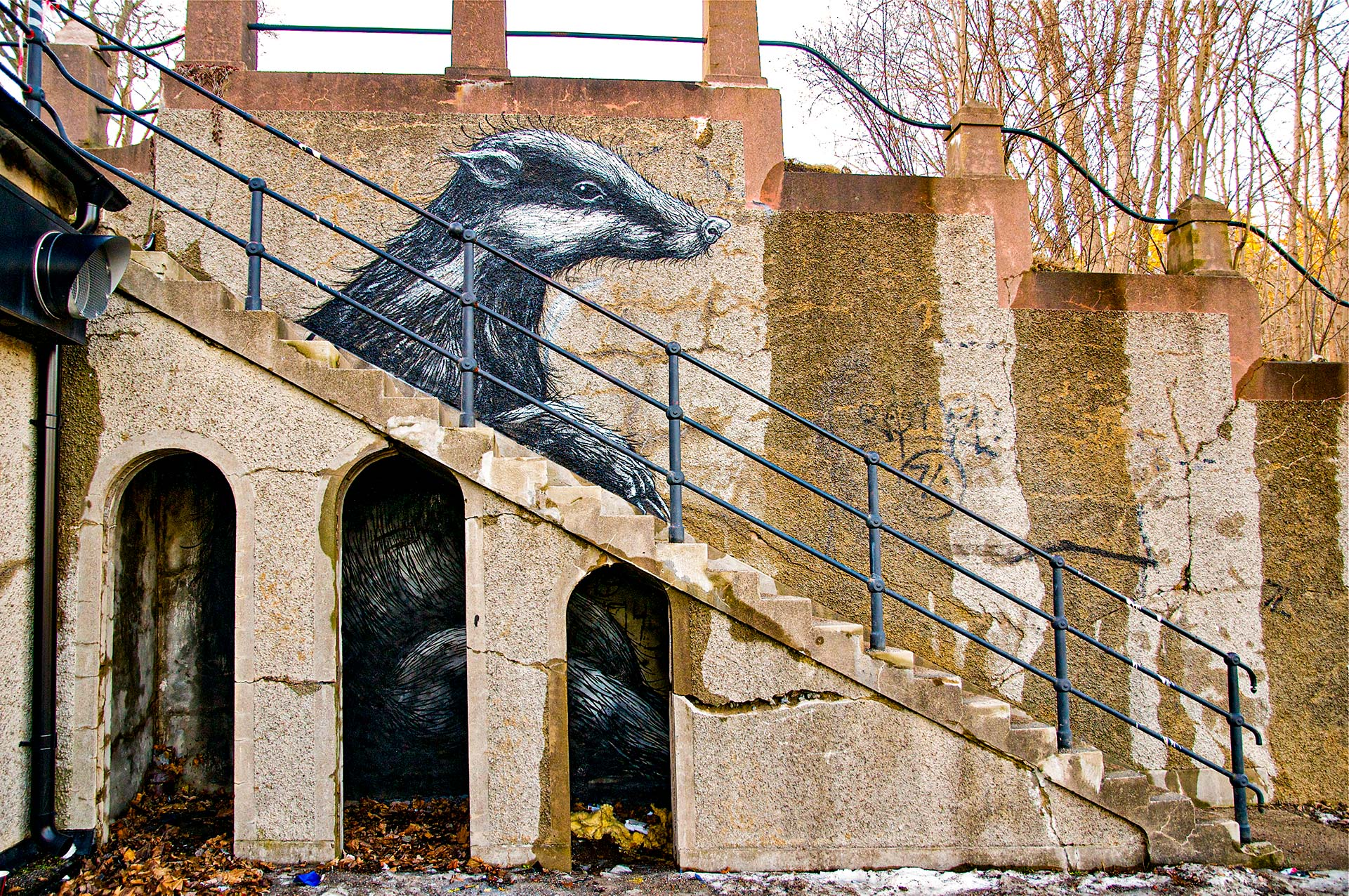
ROA's badger (2011) at Subtopia in Botkyrka, Stockholm County, Sweden.

=== North America ===
ROA painted a mural in Los Angeles of a rat's lifecycle at the now shuttered New Puppy Gallery in 2010. The mural was whitewashed in 2022.

ROA painted a mural in El Barrio, East Harlem, New York City for the MonumentArt Festival. The mural is located in Lexington Gardens on 108th Street and Lexington Avenue. Typical of Roa's work, the black and white composition features several animals. The work was commissioned to celebrate the neighborhood's culture, history, and imagination.

ROA is also responsible for painting "The Sleeping Bears" in Rochester, NY as part of a collaboration with local organization Wall\Therapy. The bears experienced public backlash due to their frequently lewd interpretation, and were later vandalized in the summer of 2021.

ROA painted a robin bird mural at Albert's Garden on Second Street in the East Village of New York City.

In October 2014, ROA painted a horned lizard mural on a building in downtown Las Vegas for the Life Is Beautiful Music & Art Festival. The mural was painted over in November 2023.

=== Oceania ===
In January 2014 ROA visited Dunedin in New Zealand and painted a tuatara mural on a building on Bath Street.

While exhibiting works at Perth's Form Gallery, ROA was commissioned by the City of Fremantle to leave his mark on Fremantle, in about 12 hours ROA created a 25-metre (82 ft) mural of a Numbat which he chose because it is a local endangered species. In 2020, ROA had a solo show at Backwoods Gallery in Melbourne, Australia.

== Bibliography ==
- ROA - CODEX, text Lucy Lippard, Robert Williams and others. March 13, 2019, Lannoo Publishers, Tielt, Belgium, EAN 9789401461672
