= Frank Corley =

Frank Corley (born Francis Huia Miller Corley; 15 January 1913 – 19 October 1995) was a New Zealand-born commercial photographer who worked in South East Queensland, and primarily Brisbane in Australia. Corley was one of a number of commercial house photographers who worked in Brisbane from the late 1950s onwards, selling photographs of suburban homes to their owners, often in the form of calendars.

Corley's business was called the Pan American Home Photographic Co., and comprised a team of employees involved in photography, sales and printing. The company's slogan was 'From Our Home to Your Home. It has been noted that because each product that was offered for sale was effectively 'unique', the business circumvented the need for a hawkers licence. Corley was married to Eunice Reid Corley (1913-1988), who worked closely with him in the enterprise. Corley was known to take the photographs from the driver's seat of his Cadillac, while Eunice followed in a 'darkroom van' where she developed the photographs. It is estimated that Corley took more than half a million photographs of Queensland houses.

While produced for commercial purposes, today, Corley's photographs represent an important and unparalleled survey of suburban Brisbane during postwar decades, capturing the city during an important moment of transition and expansion.

== Frank and Eunice Corley House Photographs Collection ==
In 1995 a large collection of Corley's photographs were acquired by the John Oxley Library, at the State Library of Queensland. The library holds more than 60,000 of Corley's black and white photographs of single detached houses. There are also a small number of photographs of suburban shops. The collection comprises unsold photographs, which were retained, largely, for taxation purposes. The collection is one of the most substantial photographic collections of housing and the suburbs in the country. As of August 2018, more than 50,000 of these have been digitised.

Since 2014 the Annerley-Stephens History Group has been working to identify the houses in the collection. The project has been co-ordinated by historian Dennis Peel, and more than 200 volunteers have been involved.

== 'Home: A Suburban Obsession' exhibition ==
The work of Frank and Eunice Corley was featured in an exhibition titled 'Home: A Suburban Obsession' at the State Library of Queensland that was on display from 6 December 2018 until 15 July 2019. The exhibition was curated by staff from the State Library and researchers from the ATCH (Architecture Theory Criticism History) Research Centre, at the University of Queensland's School of Architecture. The exhibition showcased around 500 house photographs taken by Corley that have been organised into ten thematic sets. A number of original artworks and installations, inspired by the Corley Collection, were commissioned by the Library. These included work by Ian Strange, Jennifer Marchant, f[Flat] and Seth Ellis. In December 2018 the State Library of Queensland launched an interactive online tool, known as the Corley Explorer, to facilitate public engagement with the collection and crowdsource information about the houses represented in the extant photographs. Within four months of its launch, the public had contributed more than 1000 stories related to the collection to the website. By mid-June 2019, the public had helped to geo-locate nearly forty per cent of the photographs through the Corley Explorer. The Corley Explorer was developed by Mitchell Whitelaw and Geoff Hinchcliffe, from the Data Design Lab at the ANU School of Art and Design.

In October 2019 the National Trust Queensland recognised the exhibition with the Gold award for Heritage Interpretation and Promotion, and the John Herbert Award.
