= Tanja McMillan =

Australian-New Zealand artist

Tanja McMillan (Misery)
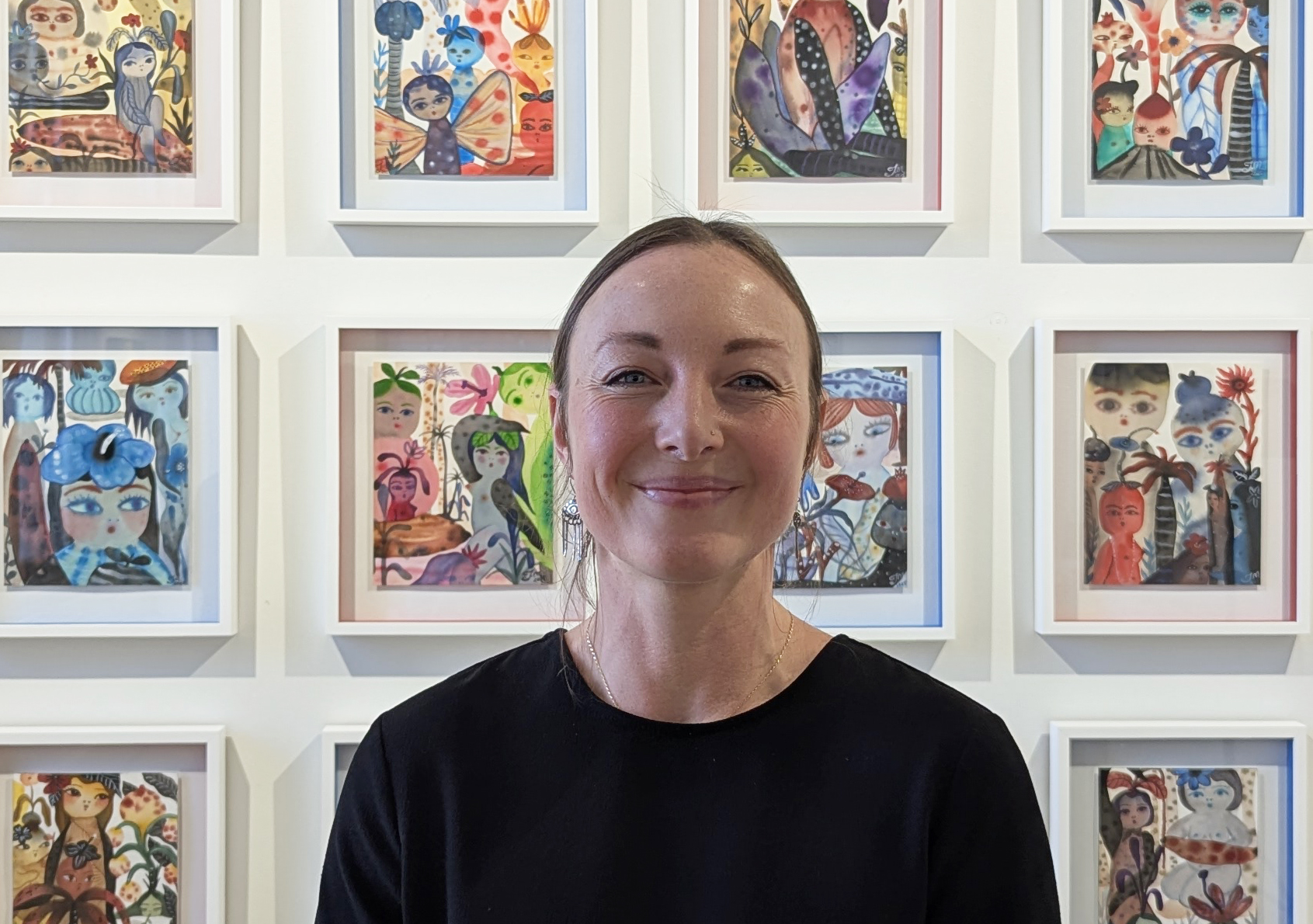
- McMillan in 2025
- Born: Tanja Jade Thompson; 1982 (age 43–44); Maryborough, Australia
- Known for: painting, drawing, sculpture
- Style: tattoo style, graffiti, kimo-kawaii
- Spouse: Tom McMillan (Tom Tom)

Tanja Jade McMillan (born Tanja Jade Thompson, also Tanja Jade, and Misery; 1982) is a graffiti artist and painter of Tahitian and Chinese descent best known as Misery, based in Auckland, New Zealand.

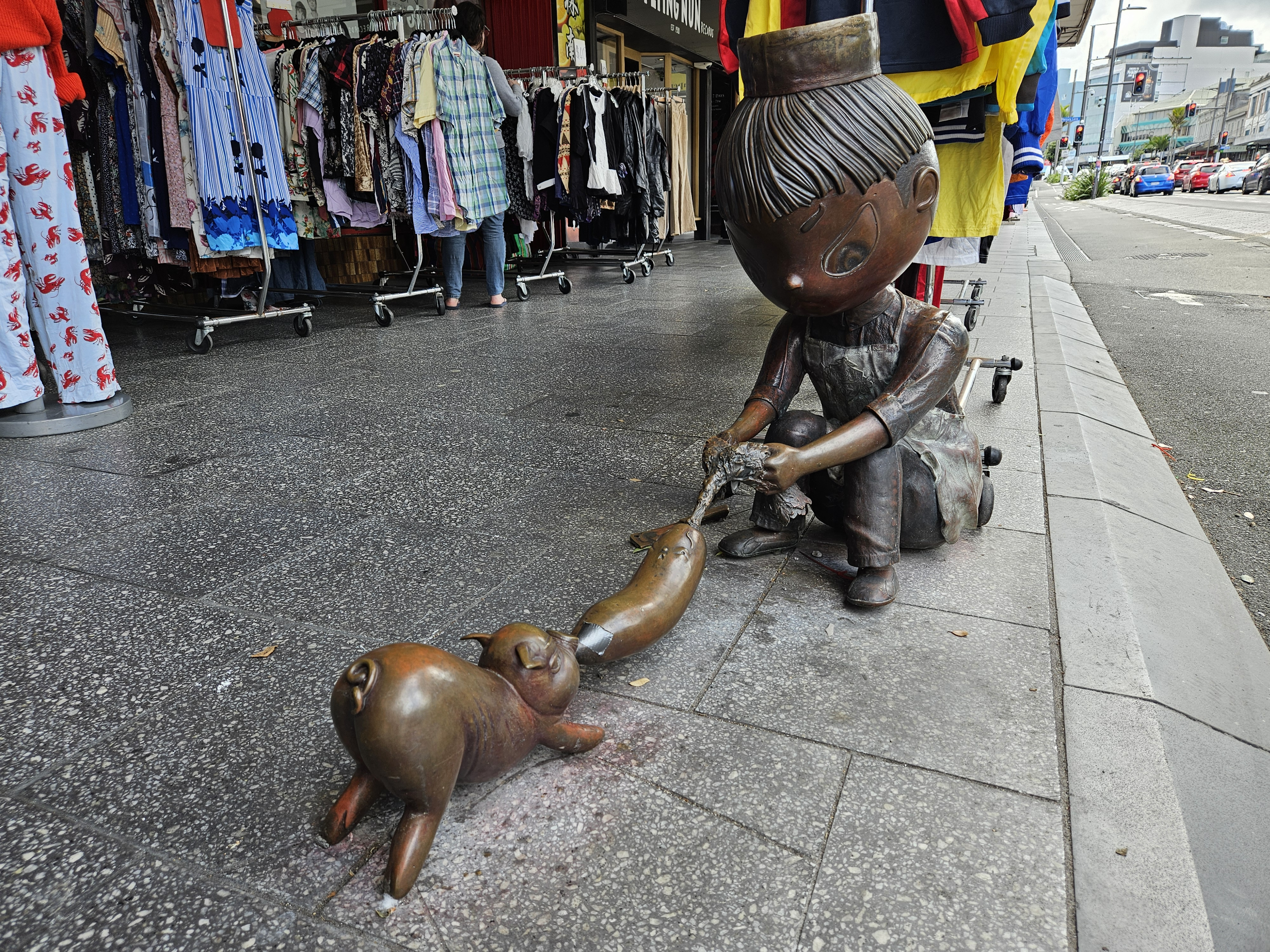
"Thief" (2015) by McMillan and John Oz, one of two sculptures located on Karangahape Road, Auckland

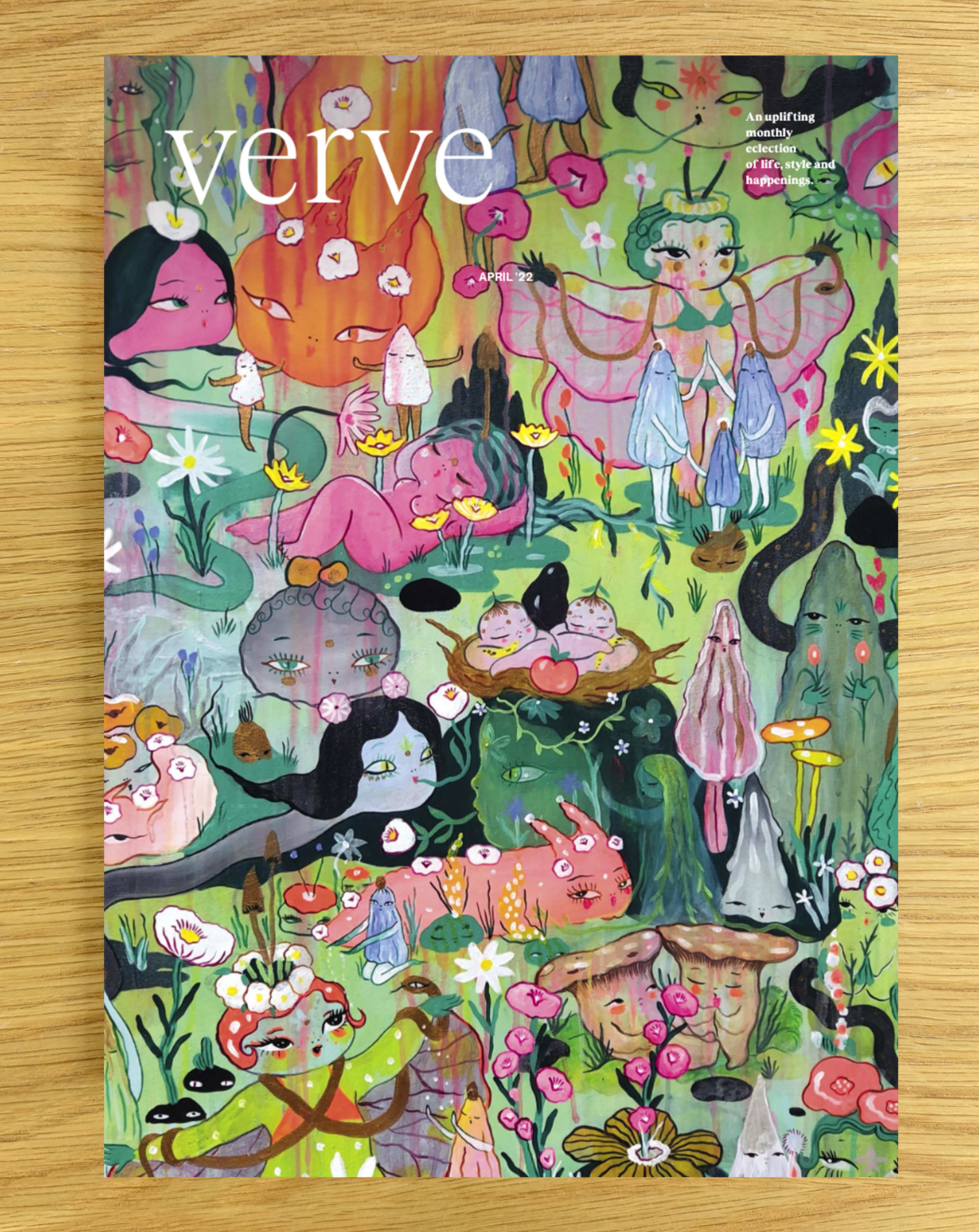
Misery on the cover of Verve, April 2022 issue

== Art career ==
McMillan was born in Maryborough, Australia. She started painting as Misery in 1997 at Auckland Metropolitan College, where she became friends with fellow student Elliot O'Donnell, best known as Askew, who given McMillan the name Misery.

In 2010, McMillan temporarily abandoned the name Misery at age 28 when she felt the brand was consuming her by ceremonially auctioning off the last of the Misery works at Webb's auction house in Auckland.

McMillan has since reclaimed the name Misery and describes her style as kimo-kawaii, creepy and cute in Japanese. Her husband is well known New Zealand tattoo artist Tom McMillan, best known as Tom Tom.

There are two bronze sculptures named Twist and Thief by McMillan on Karangahape Road, commissioned by Auckland Council to be part of Auckland Council Art Collection in collaboration with John Oz. McMillan have collaborated with many well known designers and brands, such as New Balance, Blunt, Bitra, Casio Baby-G, Telecom, Serato and Piaggio.

McMillan has been shown extensively in New Zealand and internationally such as Berlin, Taiwan, Melbourne, Paris, Hawaii and Los Angeles.

=== Selected solo exhibitions ===
- 2025: Forbidden Fruits, Bergman Gallery, Auckland, New Zealand
- 2024: All Tomorrow's Parties, Outré Gallery, Fitzroy, Australia
- 2023: Happy Valley, Outré Gallery, Fitzroy, Australia
- 2021: Fountain of Flowers, 12 Gallery, Auckland, New Zealand
- 2021: Tang Tang, Outré Gallery, Fitzroy, Australia
- 2013: Misery: Momo, Ponsonby Central, Auckland, New Zealand
- 2011: Momoka, Backwoods Gallery, Collingwood, Australia
- 2010: Misery: Deceased Estate Auction, City Works Depot, Auckland, New Zealand
- 2010: Misery, Shed 2, Auckland, New Zealand
- 2009: Misery: The Heart of Misery, Plaything Gallery, Auckland, New Zealand
- 2008: Misery: Holly Melancholy & The Night That Saved The Day, Webbs, Auckland, New Zealand
- 2007: Misery: Mighty Monster Masquerade, St Kevin’s Arcade, New Zealand

=== Selected group exhibitions ===
- 2025: Dreamland Awaits, Corey Helford Gallery, Los Angeles, California, United States
- 2025: Aotearoa Art Fair, Bergman Gallery, Viaduct Events Centre, Auckland, New Zealand
- 2024: Belonging, Stories of Contemporary New Zealand Asian Artists, Bergman Gallery, Auckland, New Zealand
- 2024: Aotearoa Art Fair, Bergman Gallery, Viaduct Events Centre, Auckland, New Zealand
- 2023: Horizon, Bergman Gallery, Auckland, New Zealand
- 2023: A Place to Call Home - Contemporary New Zealand Asian Art, Bergman Gallery, Auckland, New Zealand
- 2023: Vanguard, Outré Gallery, Fitzroy Australia
- 2022: Shiny Things, The Mercury Plaza, Auckland, New Zealand
- 2022: Bunch, North Art Gallery, Auckland, New Zealand
- 2021: The Most Dedicated: An Aotearoa Graffiti Story, Dowse Art Museum, Wellington, New Zealand
- 2021: Group Exhibition, Outré Gallery, Fitzroy Australia
- 2021: The Maxx Dose, Corbin Estate Art Centre, Auckland, New Zealand
- 2020: Yokai! Yokai!, Outré Gallery, Melbourne Australia
- 2020: Perspective - Women in Urban Art, Fiksate Gallery, Christchurch, New Zealand
- 2015: The Self-Drawing Hand (La Main qui dessinait toute seule), Danysz Gallery, Paris, France
- 2014: Pow Wow, Street Art Festival, Hawaii, United States
- 2012: DabsMyla and Friends, Think Space Gallery, New York, United States
