= Fred Fowler =

Australian artist (born 1980)

Fred Fowler is an Australian-born visual artist, specialising in painting, drawing, bronze sculpture and printmaking.

== Biography ==
Fowler was born in 1980 in Canberra, Australia. He lives and works in Melbourne, Victoria. He holds a Master of Contemporary Art from the Victorian College of the Arts.

== Fine art career ==
In 2001, at age 21, Fowler held his first solo exhibition Raiders of the Lost Art at A.R.T. Gallery Eden in Melbourne. His exhibition included stencils, paintings and rock carvings. According to the new McCulloch Encyclopedia of Australian Art, this exhibition was "one of the first private gallery exhibitions in Melbourne by a graffiti artist."

Raiders of the Lost Art was the subject of an article titled "The Street Artist Who Came in from the Cold". The article discussed Fred's artwork, both on the street and in the gallery, and also discussed the graffiti movement more widely. The journalist, Jane Faulkner, drew parallels between Fred's work and that of other artists before him like Henri Matisse and Jackson Pollock. She commented that "what unites these artists is experimentation: a word that has become synonymous with 20th century art."

In 2008, Fred held his second solo exhibition Highland Chamber at Until Never gallery in Hosier Lane. His set of five silkscreen prints were praised by reviewer Ross Moore as "a suite of fastidiously elegant black and white ink drawings."

In 2010, Fred's work was a part of the National Gallery of Australia exhibition Space Invaders. The exhibition opened on 30 October and toured to Queensland, Victoria and New South Wales in 2011.

In 2012, Fred held his third solo exhibition "Decorating the Apocalypse" at Backwoods Gallery in Melbourne. He exhibited acrylic paintings and a suite of bronze masks - commercial iconography clashed with graffiti tribalism.

Fowler's forth solo exhibition "New Landscapes" opened in June 2014 at Backwoods Gallery in Melbourne. "New Landscapes" featured a series of oil paintings that use the vehicle of landscape painting to explore the relationship between native and invasive species, analogous to the effect of colonisation on the indigenous population of Australia. "New Landscapes" received widespread acclaim and established Fowler as an important contemporary artist engaged with the Australian landscape, and also issues surrounding contemporary Australian identity. In an essay about the exhibition, Emily McCulloch Childs wrote "Fowler’s new landscapes evoke all that is ancient and beautiful about this land, and simultaneously, subtly, that which is more recent, brutal and confronting. They are a much needed, thoughtful exploration of these issues of land, animals, plants and humans, adding much to the discussion of Australia’s past and its present condition."

== Education ==
Fowler completed a Master of Contemporary Art at the Victorian College of the Arts in Melbourne, graduating in 2011. Fred's supervisor in his first year was Lecturer Jon Campbell, and in his second year, Associate Professor Jon Cattapan. Fred's areas of interest while studying at VCA were painting, etching and sculpture. Fowler's sculptural practice was mentored by Dr Tim Edwards, who taught Fowler the Lost Wax Method of casting bronze sculptures.

== Prizes, Awards and Grants ==
2013 Australia Council for the Arts - ArtStart Grant
2012 VCA/Alliance Francaise Prize
2011 National Gallery of Australia Women's Association Award

== Graffiti ==
Fred was inspired by the graffiti he saw around him in Melbourne. At age 11, Fred started experimenting with tagging in his local neighbourhood. At 15, Fred began creating throw-ups and pieces under various aliases, and at 16, Fred was given the name NUROCK by his graffiti mentor, DUET. It was from this point on, with the name NUROCK, that Fred began to paint regularly. Fred painted on train lines and public walls and also on trains, buses and trams. Fred gained notoriety painting as NUROCK both with his peers and with the general public: "In this sub-culture, Nurock is a bit of a legend. His large street pieces are quite extraordinary - intricate yet confronting, and definitely artistic."
