= Logan Hicks =

American contemporary artist (born 1971)

- Born: 1971 (age 54–55); Baltimore, Maryland, U.S.
- Education: Maryland Institute College of Art
- Occupation: Contemporary artist
- Known for: Street art Muralist
- Style: Stencil

Logan Hicks (1971) is an American contemporary artist born in 1971 and graduated from the Maryland Institute College of Art. He lives and works in Brooklyn, New York and he is considered as one of the best stencil artists in the world.

== Background ==
Logan Hicks was born in 1971 and grew up south of Baltimore, Maryland. In 1993 he left Maryland Institute College of Art a couple of classes short of a degree to start a screen printing business in Baltimore where printed t-shirts, stickers and posters.

In 1999 he moved to San Diego after befriending Shepard Fairey. Leaving his screen printing press behind in Baltimore he began to use stencils for his own art.

In 2001 he moved to Los Angeles.

In 2007 he moved back to the East Coast, relocating to Brooklyn, New York where he continues to exhibit his work.

In 2008 Hicks was one of two artists selected by Banksy to represent the United States in the Cans Festival in London.

In 2010 he was selected to paint at Wynwood Walls In Miami by real estate visionary Tony Goldman.

In 2016 he painted a mural at the home of the Miami Dolphins - Hard Rock Stadium.

In 2023, he painted a mural in Paris, in the corridor linking Auber station and Opéra station.

== Artwork ==
Called a painter with a photographer's eye, Hicks’ work has largely focused on the perception of the environment, at times humanizing its architectural angles and structures, and at others using its vastness to explore self identity. With an old masters approach to lighting, Hicks sculpts ordinary architectural scenes into deeply metaphorical and contemplative imagery through stenciled aerosol.

Over the years, Hicks has developed his impeccable photorealistic style using stencils, sometimes using up to 15 layers of stencil to achieve this precision. Working from his own photographs, subjects are translated to multiple layers of stencils, brought to bold dimensionality by blending colors through aerosol.

== Bowery wall ==
“Story of My Life” is the title of a mural made by Hicks at the intersection of Houston Street and the Bowery in New York City. Made of 1,050 stencils and measuring 70-feet by 20-feet, this mural is composed of images of 150 people. The mural “contains friends, family and people that the artist personally knows around New York.
