= Anthony Lister =

Australian artist (born 1979)

- Born: 1979 (age 46–47); Brisbane, Australia
- Education: Bachelor of Fine Arts, apprenticed under Max Gimblett (2002)
- Known for: Painting, drawing, printmaking, installation
- Movement: Lowbrow, street art
- Website: www.anthonylister.com

Anthony Lister (born 1979) is a contemporary Australian artist. Lister helped pioneer the street art movement in his home city Brisbane as a teenager, and later in the inner suburbs of Sydney and Melbourne. His artistic style employs charcoal, acrylic, spray paint, and oil. His exhibitions include those held at the Urban Spree Gallery in Berlin, Robert Fontaine Gallery in Miami,Allouche Gallery in New York, Olsen Gallery in Sydney, and Black Art Projects in Melbourne.

== Early life and education ==
Anthony Lister was born in Brisbane, Australia, in 1979. As a child he was influenced by his grandmother, who used to take him to art galleries. She also taught him to paint, and showed him the work of Brett Whitely and Arthur Streeton at her home.

He attended Queensland College of Art, graduating in 2001 with a Bachelor of Fine Arts .

== Career ==
=== Artistic career ===
Shortly after graduating, Lister travelled to New York, where he found mentorship under influential New Zealand artist Max Gimblett.

Lister has since exhibited his work extensively within Australia and internationally both in the gallery and on the streets, notably with Bogan Paradise, a three-story exhibition in a disused sex shop in Sydney 2011, Los Angeles solo exhibition curated by Roger Gatsman 2011, Los Angeles solo show New Image Art 2011 and Unslung Heros, The Outsiders/Lazarides Gallery, London and Newcastle, UK 2012.

As of 2007 Lister's work presents fusion of culture, with influences from a number of areas and genres, including street art, expressionism, pop art, and contemporary youth culture. Commercially, Lister has worked with various international fashion, lifestyle and technological brands such as Hermès, The Standard Hotel, Westfield, Vogue Australia, Samsung, and Mercedes-Benz. He has also collaborated with many well-known artists and personalities, including Blek le Rat, Space Invader, Mark "Chopper" Read and Nick Cave.

Lister's work is included in the collections of National Gallery of Australia, David Roberts Collection, TVS Partnership, Brand & Slater Architects, Brisbane Grammar School, BHP Collection and Artbank.1,1

=== In film ===
Documentary-maker Eddie Martin released a short film about Lister's career in 2017 titled 'Have You Seen the Listers?'

== Legal issues ==
Lister was arrested in 2020, on accusations of drugging and raping several young women. Police seized replica pistols, drugs, and electronics. He was refused bail. He was granted conditional bail in the Central Local Court in Sydney.

In October 2024, Lister was found not guilty by a jury on four out of nine charges. The jury did not reach a verdict on the other five charges, and a retrial was scheduled for 2025. His identity was subject to a suppression order until 12 December 2024, when his name was revealed and published in news outlets.

The suppression order was implemented in 2020 after Lister received death threats. During the 2024 trial, the media referred to Lister only as an unnamed "high-profile Sydney man" and was not permitted to publish other details that could potentially identify him. The judge who lifted the suppression order in December 2024 disagreed with characterising Lister as high-profile and suggested that he reduce his online presence to avoid further threats.

Lister was found not guilty on the remaining three counts of sexual assault in November 2025.

== Bibliography ==
YEAR	TITLE	PUBLISHER
2015	Public Spaces: Public People	Griffith Law Journal, AUS
2014	Anthony Lister: Adventure Painter by Roger Gastman	Gingko Press, USA
2013	Anthony Lister Sketchbook - 10 Years of Selected Drawings	Blackarts Projects
2010	Beyond The Street- The 100 Leading Figures in Urban Art	Gestalten, USA
2010	Trespass: A History of Uncommissioned Art	Taschen, USA
2010	Stickers: From Punk Rock to Contemporary Art	Rizzoli Books, USA
2010	Anthony Lister	Macmillan Art Publishing, AUS
2009	Tales of White Trash Prophecy	Upper Playground, USA
2008	God Has a Plan to Kill Me	KGallery, Italy
2007	Uncommissioned Art	Melbourne University, AUS
2007	Alarmi3	Vanilla edizioni, Italy
2006	Unfinished Journey	Macmillan Art Publishing, AUS
2006	The Guild	Seven Nine Press, AUS
2005	Anthony Lister: Twice On Sundays	Fox Galleries Publications, AUS
2005	I NY, New York Street Art	Verlag GmbH &Co. KG, GER
2005	Conform	Palgrave Macmillan Publishers, AUS
2004	Anthony Lister Subtitled DVD	Fox Galleries Publications, AUS
2003	Places & Things	Fox Galleries Publications, AUS
