= Ian Strange (Australian artist) =

Ian Strange (born 1983) is an Australian multi-disciplinary artist. His work investigates space, architecture and the home, alongside broader themes of disenfranchisement within the built environment.

Strange lived in Perth as a child, and is now based in New York.

He is best known for his 'Suburban Intervention' projects and exhibitions. Using the suburban home as a canvas, Strange's work incorporates large-scale projects, film, photography, site-specific installation, sculptural installations, drawing, painting and on-going research projects

Independent art advisor Sarah Crown has said that "Strange's monumental interventions exist on two extremes of the spectrum of destruction and of elevation. By doing so he challenges our understanding of home and safety."

Strange has presented a project in the NGV Studio space at the National Gallery of Victoria, ['Suburban', 2011-2013], The Canterbury Museum ['Final Act', 2013], as well as having participated in the 2014 Adelaide Biennial of Australian Art at the Art Gallery of South Australia with 'LANDED' a commissioned sculptural installation on the forecourt of the gallery. 'SHADOW' [2015] a large-scale project incorporating suburban homes, documented in film and photography for PUBLIC Festival 2015; and 'ZŁOTY', a site-specific intervention onto the exterior of a historical building commissioned by the Intytucja Kultury, Katowice, Poland [2015]. He most recently collaborated with Standard Practice, a New York-based Artist Run Initiative, to present his body of work SUBURBAN on Bowery street in New York, May 2016.

In 2017, a documentary was released and broadcast by ABCTV under the title HOME: The Art of Ian Strange

In 2018 the State Library of Queensland commissioned Strange to produce a work inspired by the Frank and Eunice Corley House Photographs Collection. In response he produced a large scale charcoal triptych drawing titled 'Sixteen'. The work was first exhibited in the Home: a Suburban Obsession exhibition, which was on show in 2018 and 2019.

His work is included in public collections, including the National Gallery of Victoria, Australia, Art Gallery of South Australia, Art Gallery of Western Australia, and the Canterbury Museum, New Zealand.

== See also ==
- Installation art
- Art intervention
