= Slava Ostap =

Ostap (Slava Osinski)
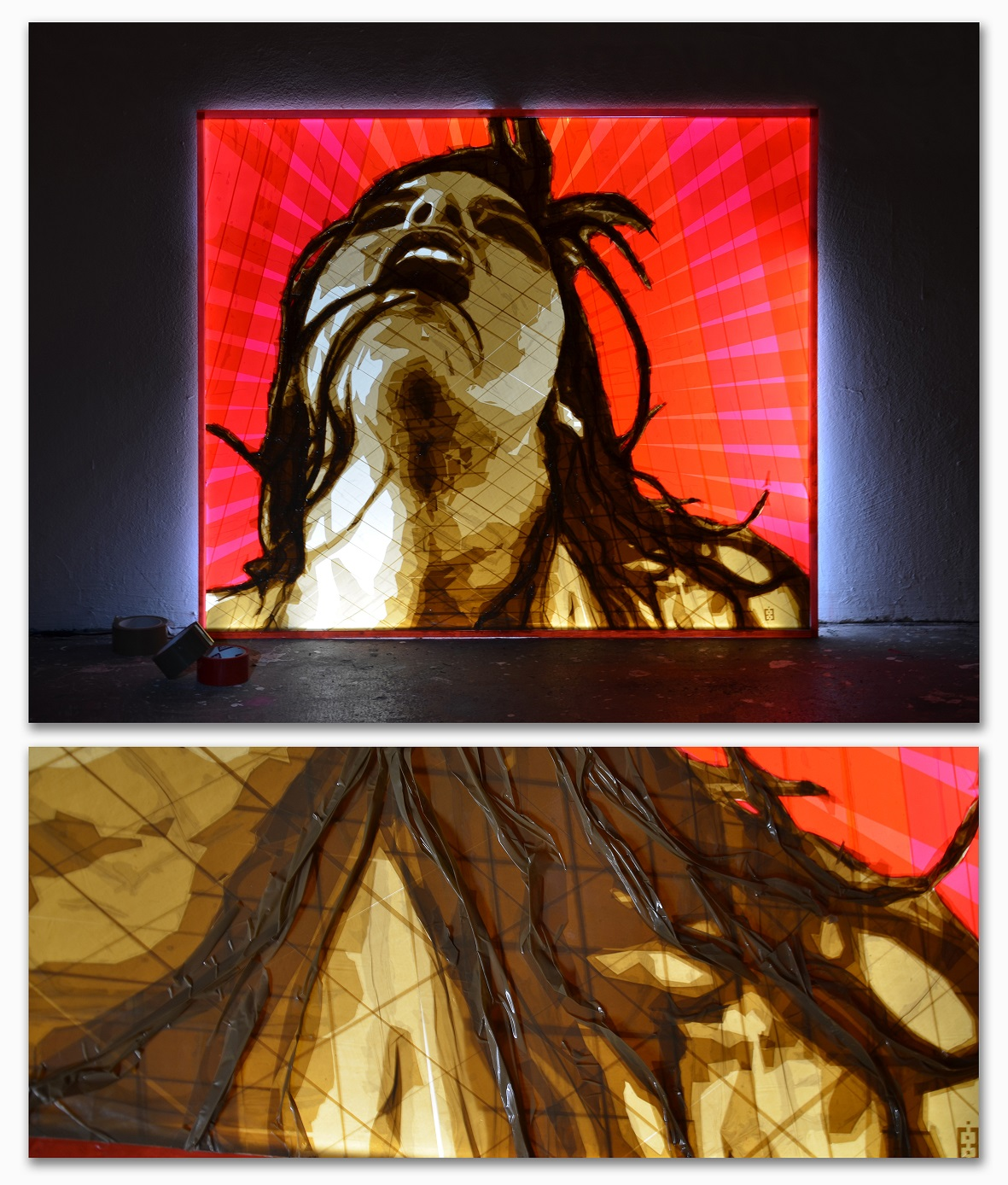
- Tape art by Slava Ostap
- Born: Вячеслав Осинский; 1978 (age 47–48); Dnipropetrowsk, Ukraine USSR
- Known for: Street art, Urban art, Tape art, Contemporary art, Fine artist
- Website: selfmadecrew.com

Slava "Ostap" Osinski is a street artist who creates works on acrylic glass using packing tape and duct tape. He also produces live performances and installation art works.

Ostap was born and raised in Dnipropetrowsk in Ukraine, where he studied architecture. In 1995 he moved to Germany and he later moved to Berlin. Ostap has been active in Berlin's street art and urban art scene since 2013.

== Career ==
Ostap was a resident artist at the Urban Spree gallery in Berlin in December 2012. In an interview about his work, Ostap has said:

"5 years ago I found Tape art - the art of gluing sticky tape. I have worked with this media ever since. Very often I mix the Tape Art with other forms of art, for example, Street Art, in which I try to give the impulse to find the new art-forms. Installations with the sticky tape give me the opportunity to present my ideas with the new point of view."

Ostap's work is influenced by modern culture and pop culture, politics, society, religion and sex. He cites pop art artists such as Andy Warhol as influences, as well as impressionist artists including Vincent van Gogh.

== Works ==
Ostap says of his art:

"I distance myself from the classic form of street art, like graffiti or tagging – with my art, I try to arouse an emotion in the audience, especially positive emotions, like smiles or laughs, or on the contrary – to show my personal attitude to the modern culture, politics, society, religion and sex. It does not mean, that in every work there is a great meaning, sometimes, I like to work with abstract forms and minimalist shapes."

Although a street artist, Ostap's works have also been exhibited in various projects and galleries.

== Gallery ==
Video: Live Taping Show

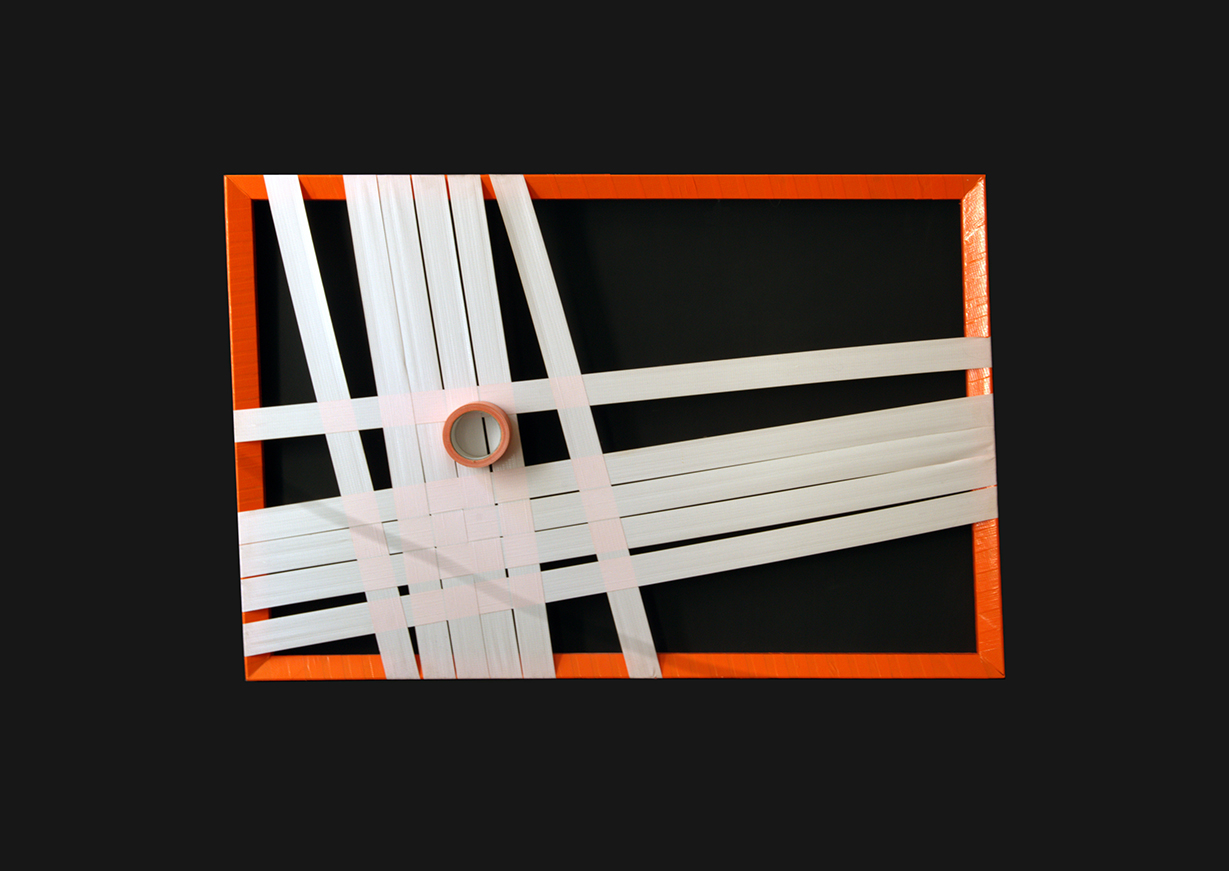
"Orange"

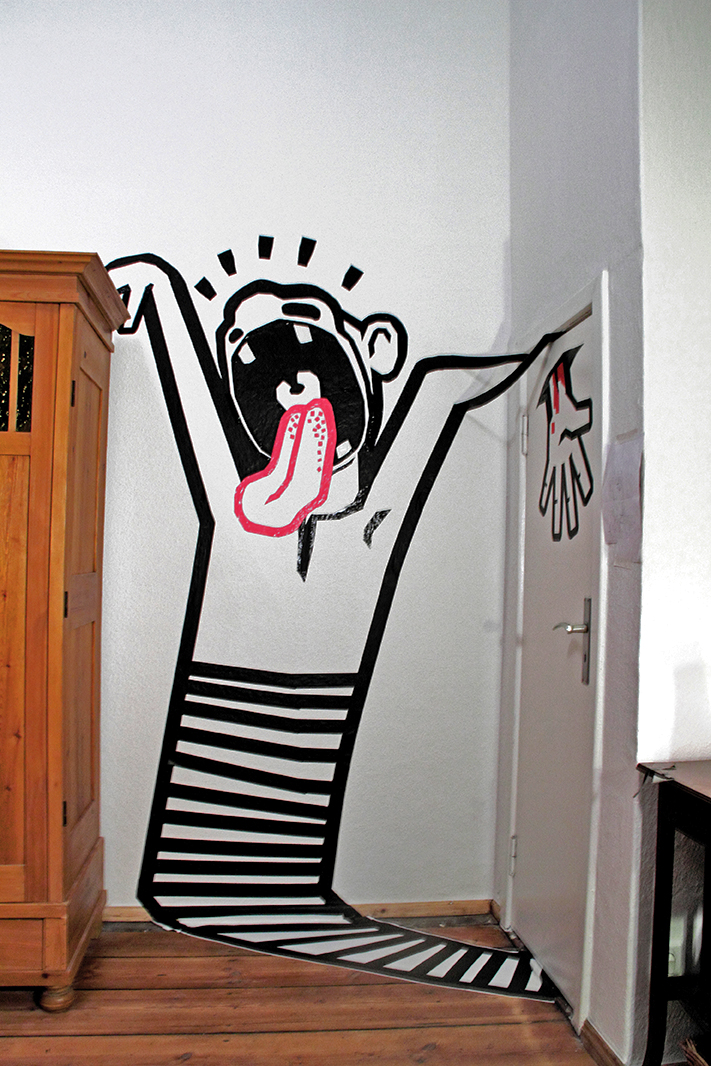
"Schrei"

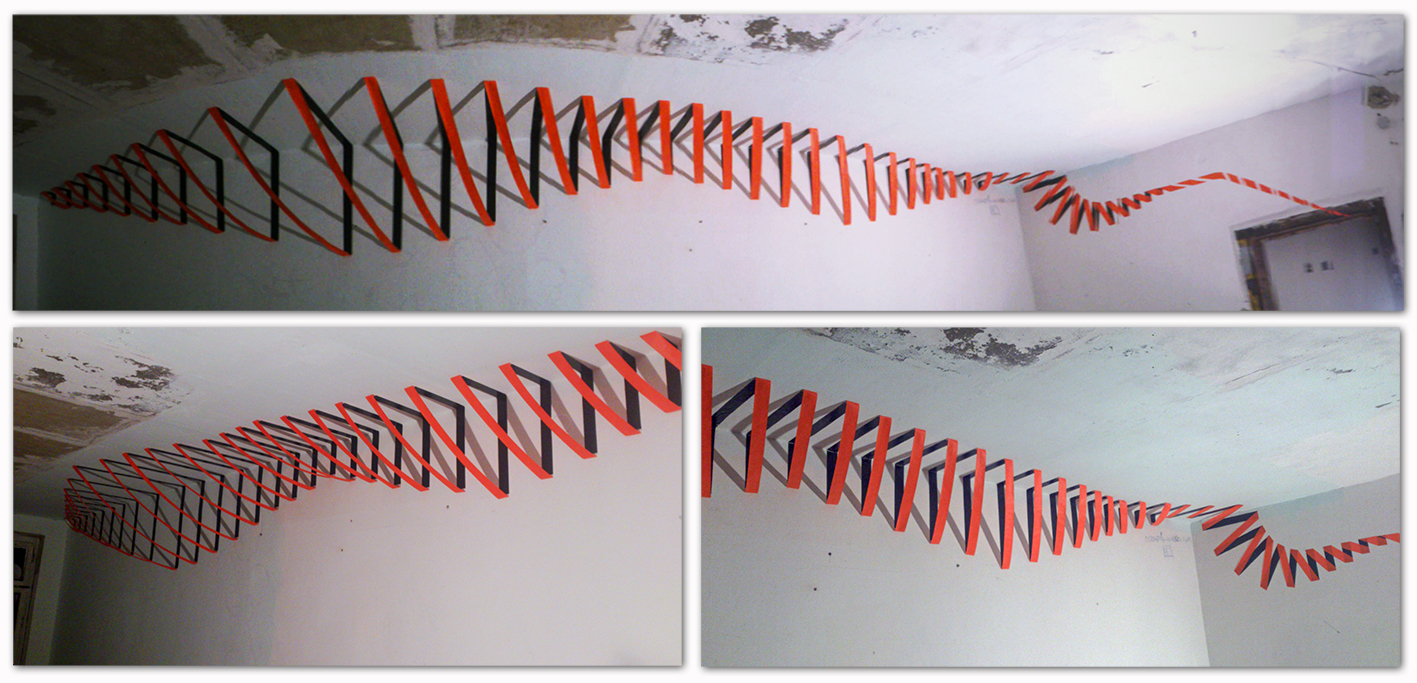
"Move"
