= Max Zorn =

Max Zorn may refer to:

- Max August Zorn (1906–1993), German mathematician
- Max Zorn (artist), Dutch-German artist
