= Museum of Urban and Contemporary Art =

Art museum in Munich, Germany

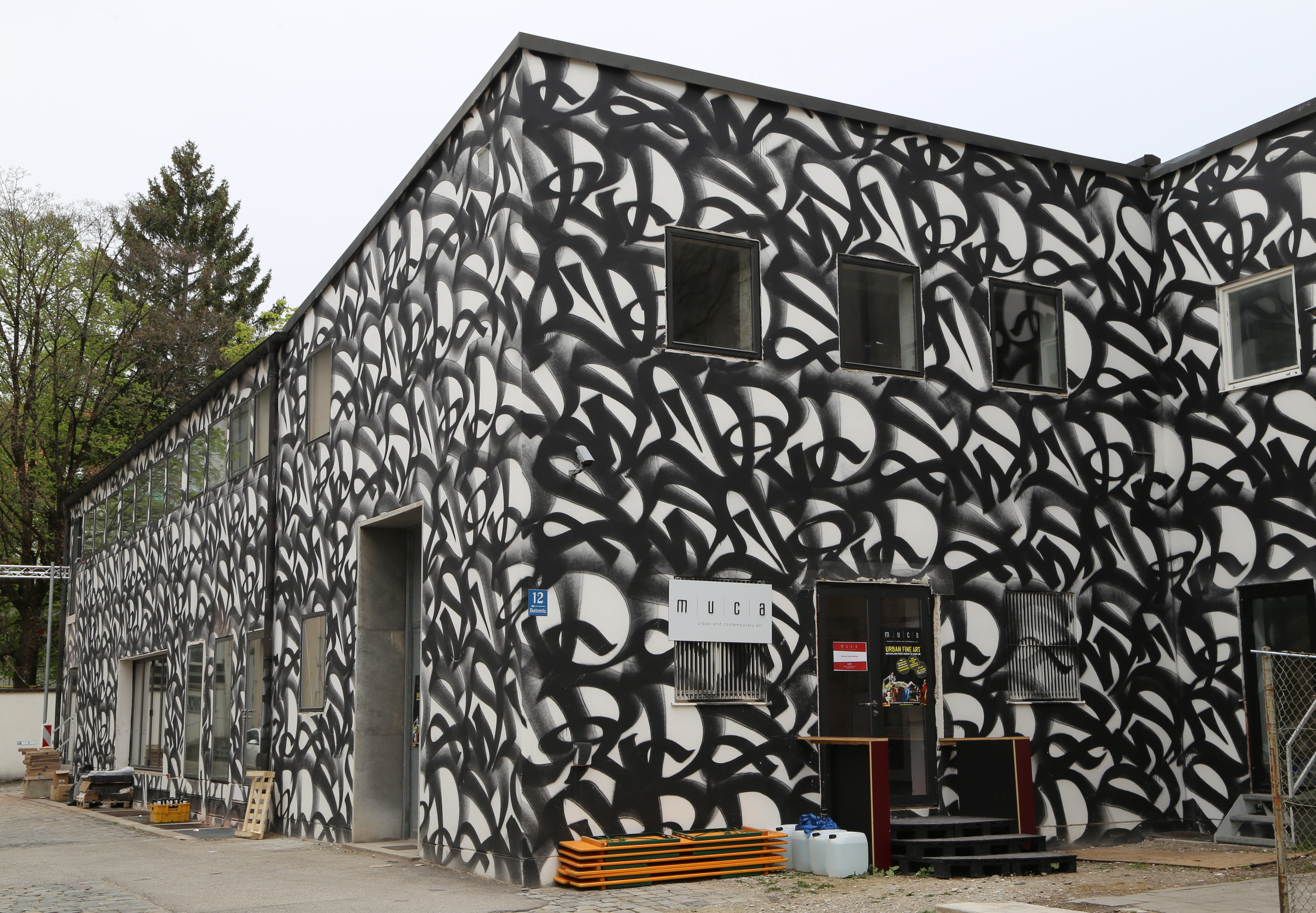
- MUCA main building at Hotterstraße 12 (2017)
- Established: 2016
- Location: Hotterstraße 12, 80331 Munich, Germany
- Coordinates: 48.13669°N 11.56993°E
- Type: Art museum
- Founder: Stephanie Utz, Christian Utz
- Website: www.muca.eu

The Museum of Urban and Contemporary Art (MUCA) is an art museum in Munich, Germany. Founded by Stephanie and Christian Utz, it opened on 9 December 2016 in a former municipal electricity substation at Hotterstraße 12 in the city’s Altstadt district.

MUCA presents changing exhibitions of urban art and contemporary art across several sites, including the adjacent MUCA Bunker and the interim arts centre KUNSTLABOR 2 at Dachauer Straße 90 (approved in 2019; opened in 2021; authorisation to 2026). Notable exhibitions have included Damien Hirst: The Weight of Things (2023–2024), reviewed by the Frankfurter Allgemeine Zeitung and Wallpaper*, and artworks such as Banksy’s Girl Without Balloon in 2025.

== History ==
MUCA opened on 9 December 2016 and was initiated by Stephanie and Christian Utz.

== Buildings and sites ==
=== Main building ===
The museum occupies a former municipal electricity substation at Hotterstraße 12 in Munich’s Altstadt.

=== MUCA Bunker ===
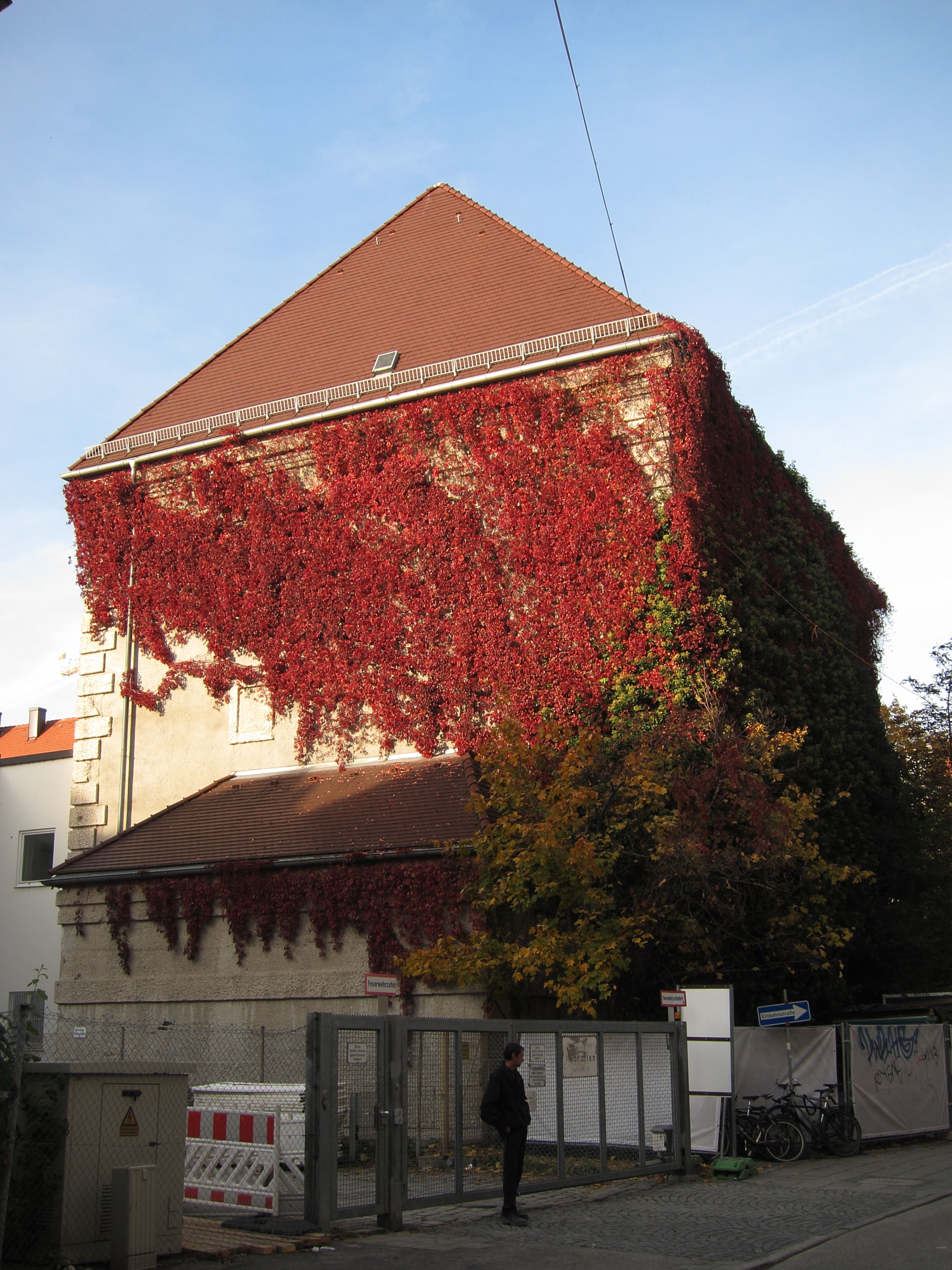
MUCA Bunker (Hochbunker Hotterstraße), exterior (2011).

An adjacent Second World War air‑raid shelter serves as an additional exhibition space known as the MUCA Bunker.

=== KUNSTLABOR 2 ===
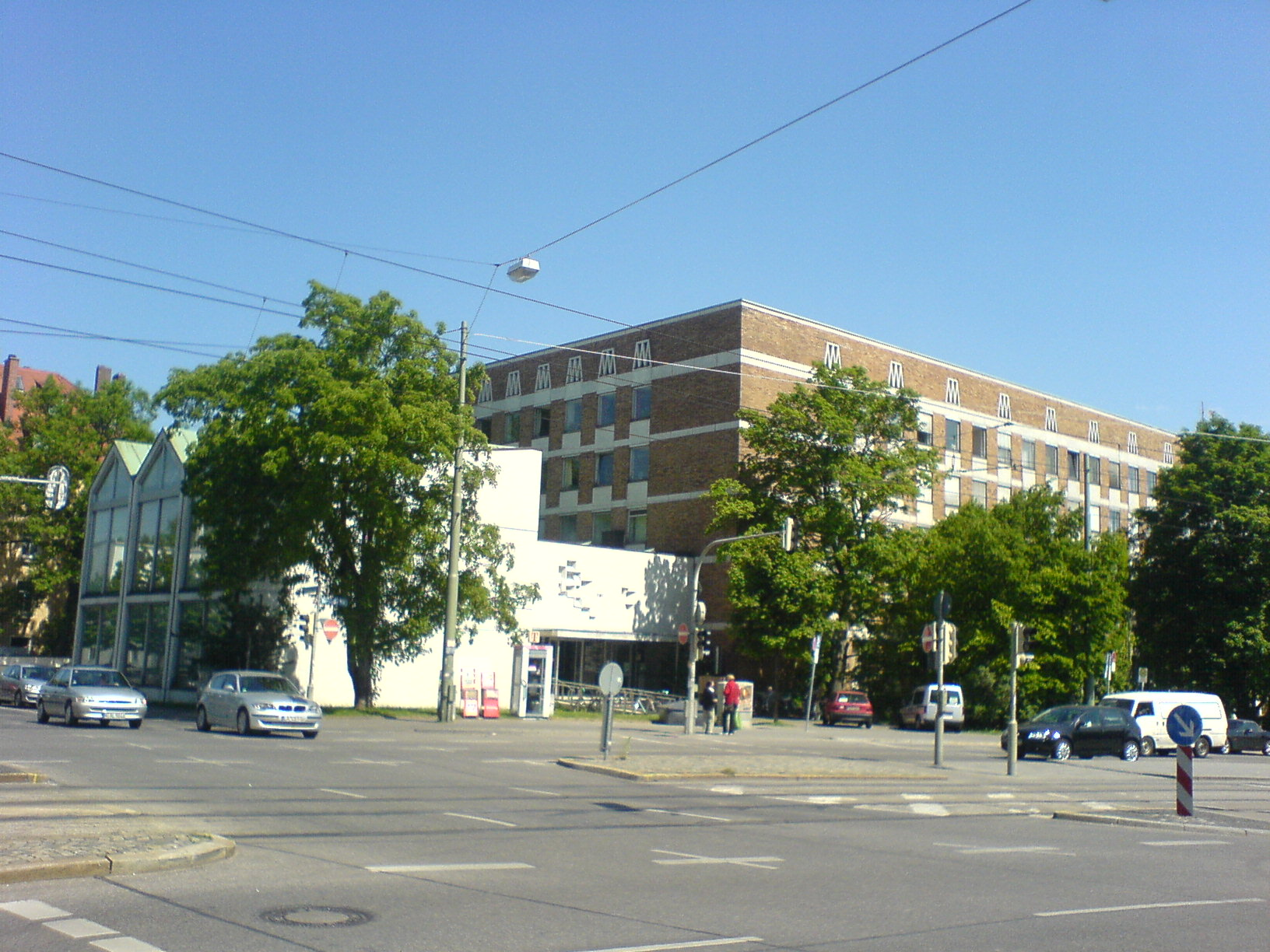
Former municipal health department building at Dachauer Straße 90 (2008), later used for KUNSTLABOR 2.

Since 2021 MUCA has operated KUNSTLABOR 2, an interim arts centre in the former municipal health department at Dachauer Straße 90. The project was approved in 2019 and has an authorisation running to 2026.

== Governance and funding ==
The museum is privately operated by the founders. The non‑profit MUCA Foundation was established in 2019 to support exhibitions and educational activities.

== Notable exhibitions ==
Ikonen der Urban Art (2020), MUCA main building; coverage noted works by Banksy among others.

Max Zorn: City Lights (21 October 2022 – 10 September 2023), MUCA Bunker; solo display of illuminated tape works by Dutch artist Max Zorn.

Damien Hirst: The Weight of Things (26 October 2023 – 24 November 2024), MUCA main building; survey spanning four decades, reviewed by the Frankfurter Allgemeine Zeitung and Wallpaper*.

Banksy: Girl Without Balloon (display), MUCA Bunker: 14 February – 13 April 2025, and again 25 July – 26 October 2025.

== Reception and criticism ==
In March 2024, The Guardian reported that several Damien Hirst formaldehyde works dated to the 1990s were made in 2017. The article noted that MUCA’s label for a dissected shark listed the date as 1993, and quoted a museum spokesperson stating that MUCA displayed catalogue information as provided by the artist’s studio.
