= Ceet Fouad =

French-Algerian graffiti artist

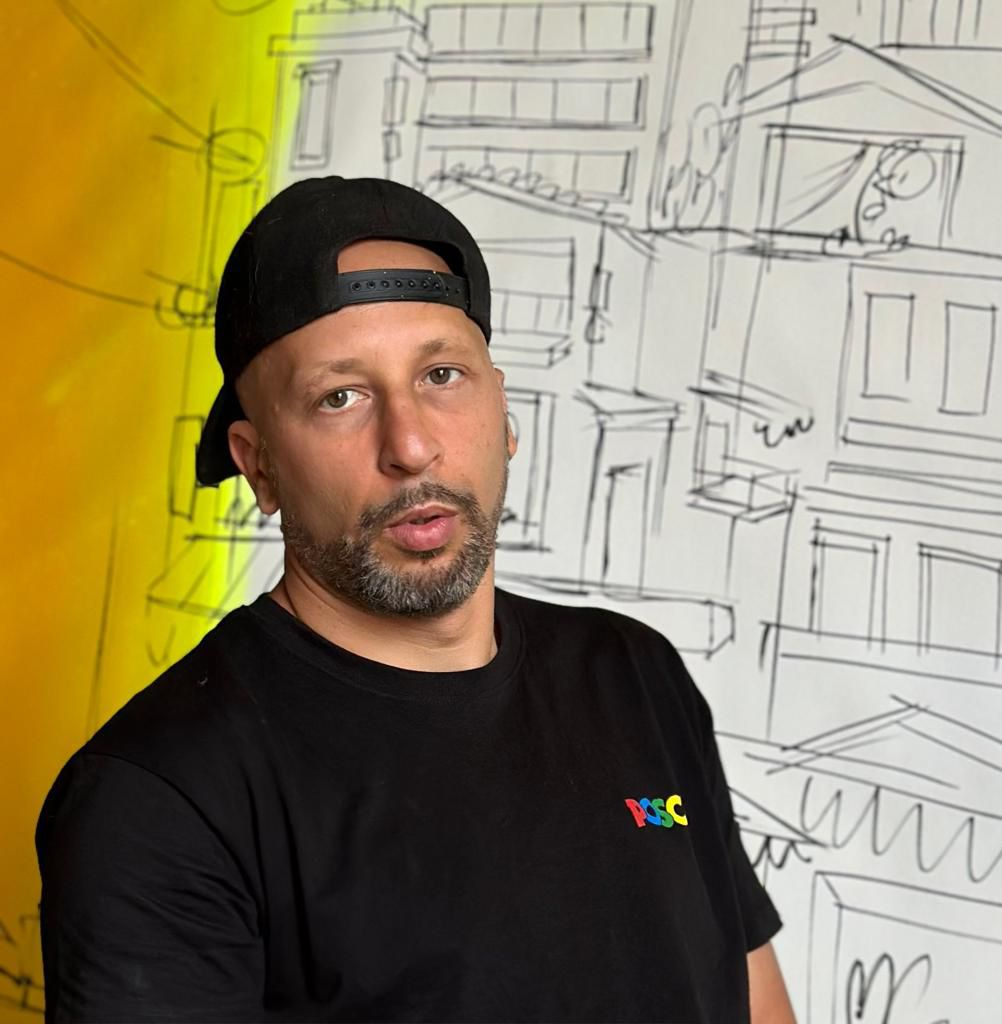
- Ceet Fouad in 2024.
- Born: 1971 (age 54–55); Algeria
- Occupation: Artist
- Website: www.ceetfouad.com

Ceet Fouad [pronounced: “see-TEE”] (born 1971) is a French-Moroccan graffiti artist.

== Biography ==
Ceet Fouad was born in Algeria in 1971, of Moroccan descent, and moved to Toulouse, France, in 1978 at the age of seven years old. Since 2003, Fouad has been based in Shenzhen, north of Hong Kong.

In 2019 he completed a 40m tall mural on a building in Toulouse, France.

Ceet’s love for art would start in 2003 while drawing his visual images as a way to communicate, but later made his connection deeper with his artwork, the chickens, or the “Chicanos” he calls them. They are small, bubbly, and vibrant figures of chickens and Ceet uses them to connect to the idea of "regular everyday people" are the same.

== Exhibitions ==
He has been a regular artist-in-residence at the Montresso Foundation's art estate in Marrakesh, the "Jardin Rouge", since 2014.

- 1997 Lyon Biennale of Contemporary Art
- 1999 Museum of Modern Art in Vienna
- 2000 National Museum of Popular Arts and Traditions in Paris
- 2001 Museum of Castres
- 2007 Shenzhen — Hong Kong Bi-City Biennale of Urbanism and Architecture
- 2015 UrbanArt Biennale in Germany
- 2016 Pop-Up Show at the Pompidou Centre in Paris.
- 2017 Amanda Wei Gallery Hong Kong - Art Stage (Off The Wall) Jakarta - Affordable Art Fair Hong Kong - Jardin Orange gallery Shenzhen.
- 2018 Alain Daudet gallery Toulouse - Idroom Gallery Genève - Galerie Very Yes Saint-Pierre, Réunion.
- 2019 Biennale Urban Art Museum Völklingen - Art Fair Taipe Taiwan - Amanda Wei Gallery Hong Kong.
- 2022 Amanda Wei Gallery, Hong Kong
