= Mark Khaisman =

Ukrainian-born visual artist (born 1958)

- Born: 1958 (age 67–68); Kyiv, Ukrainian SSR
- Education: Moscow Architectural Institute, 1982
- Known for: Mixed media, Sculpture, Video art, Tape art

Mark Khaisman (Ukrainian: Марк Хайсман, born 1958, Kyiv, Ukraine) is a Ukrainian-born visual artist who currently lives and works in Jenkintown, Pennsylvania, having relocated to the United States in 1989. He creates his works by applying layers of translucent packaging tape on clear, backlit Plexiglas panels in order to create areas of light and shadow that, viewed as a whole, compose images of recognizable persons or objects. Khaisman's subject matter has come from various sources, including art history, old movies, 20th-century propaganda art, and his own photographs.

Khaisman was a practicing architect for two decades, working in the areas of architecture, animation, and stained glass design, before he began to exhibit his tape works in 2005. He was inspired to create works with packaging tape when he looked at a tape-covered stained glass work in progress and saw beauty in the patterns made by the tape. Since 2005, his work has been exhibited by a number of galleries, mostly located in Philadelphia or in nearby areas of Pennsylvania and New Jersey. He has also exhibited in non-gallery spaces, including Philadelphia International Airport and the headquarters of Urban Outfitters.

== Biography ==
Khaisman studied Art and Architecture at the Moscow Architectural Institute in 1982. While in college he participated in a number of international conceptual architecture competitions. In 1983, he was accepted as a member at Moscow Artist Association, and from 1983 to 1989 he worked as a member at State Animation Studio as the art director for seven puppet animation movies.

He teamed with Lev Evzovitch on his conceptual architecture and art projects; Evzovitch who later formed the art group AES+F. In 1989 Khaisman moved to US, where he worked as stained glass designer and architect. In 2004 he developed his own technique of using layers of translucent brown tape on backlit Plexiglas panels to create dramatic illuminations.
