= Le Mur (urban art) =

Urban art location in Paris, France

Coordinates: 48.8659°N 2.3777°E

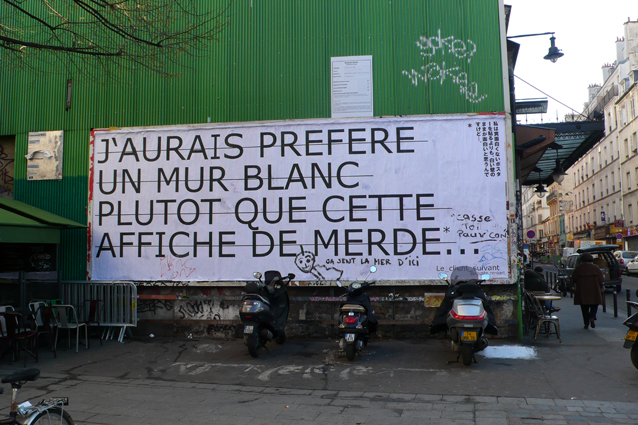
The site in 2008

Le Mur is a contemporary urban art spot in rue Oberkampf (11eme arrondissement) in Paris, France.

It is the initial spot of the street art movement in Paris in April 2000. Le Mur was at this time an advertising billboard was firstly hijacked by artist Hephaestus in spring 2000.

In 2007 it became an officially sanctioned street exhibition space.
