= Urban art biennial =

German arts festival

UrbanArt Biennale
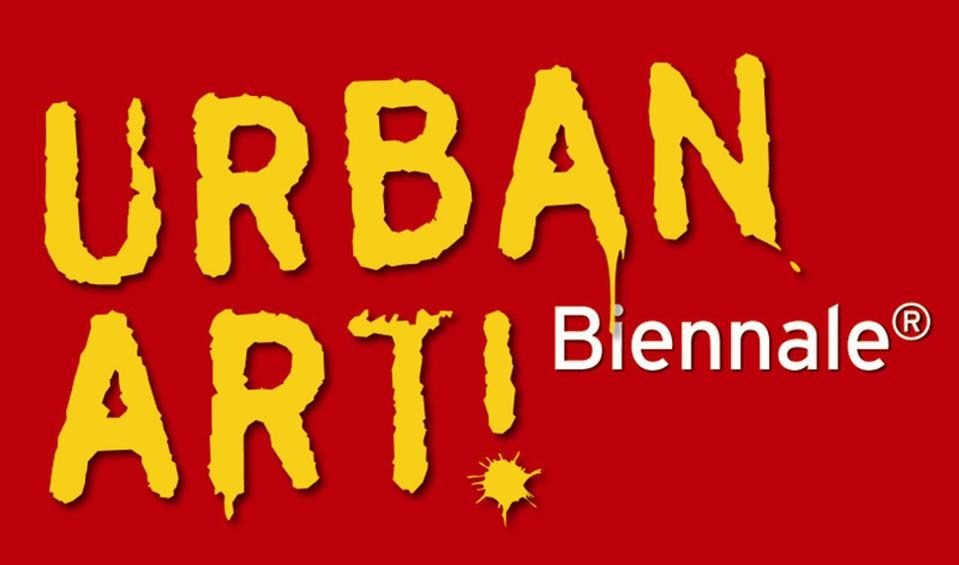
- Logo of the UrbanArt Biennale
- Venue: Völklingen Ironworks
- Location: Völklingen
- Type: Biennale
- Website: voelklinger-huette.org

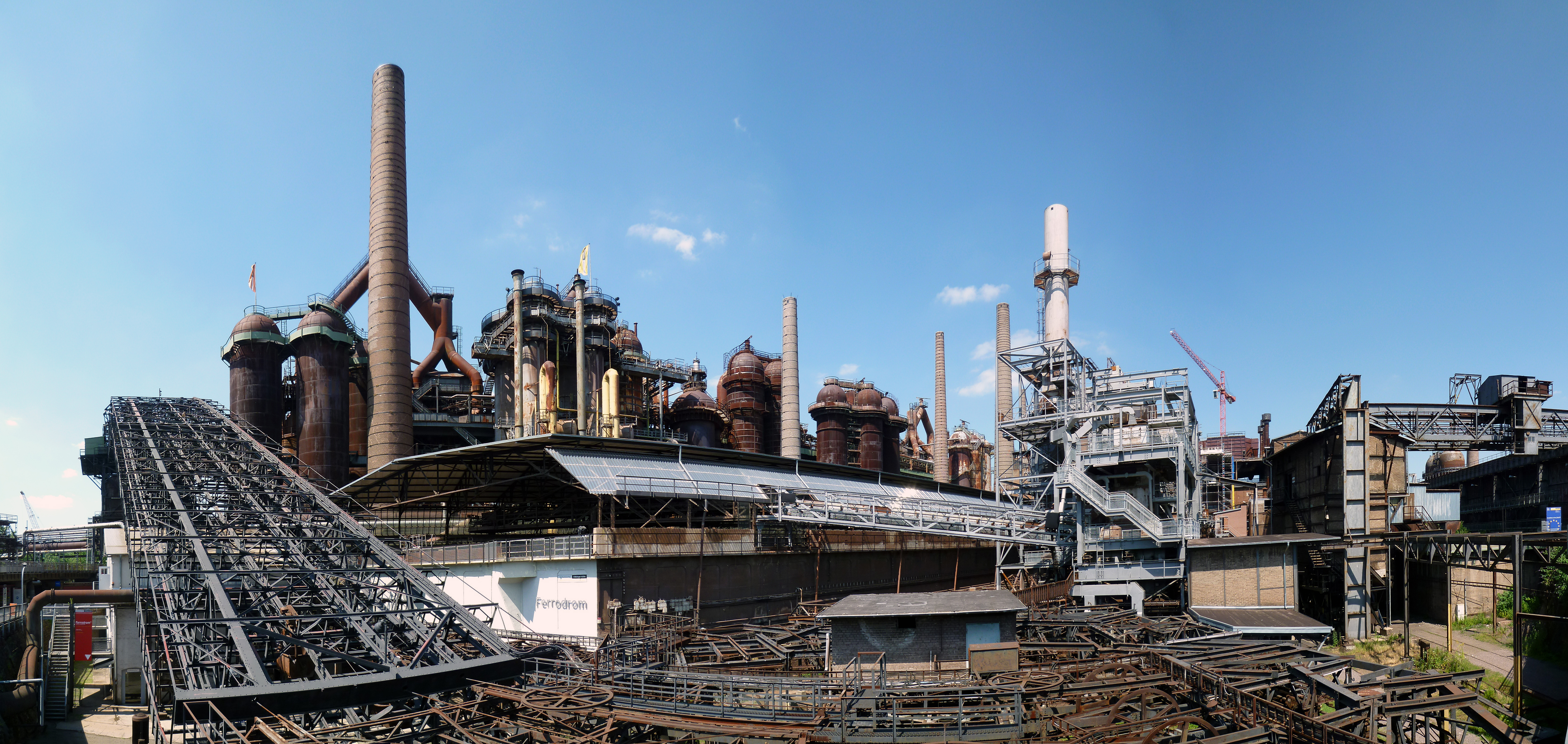
Völklingen Ironworks

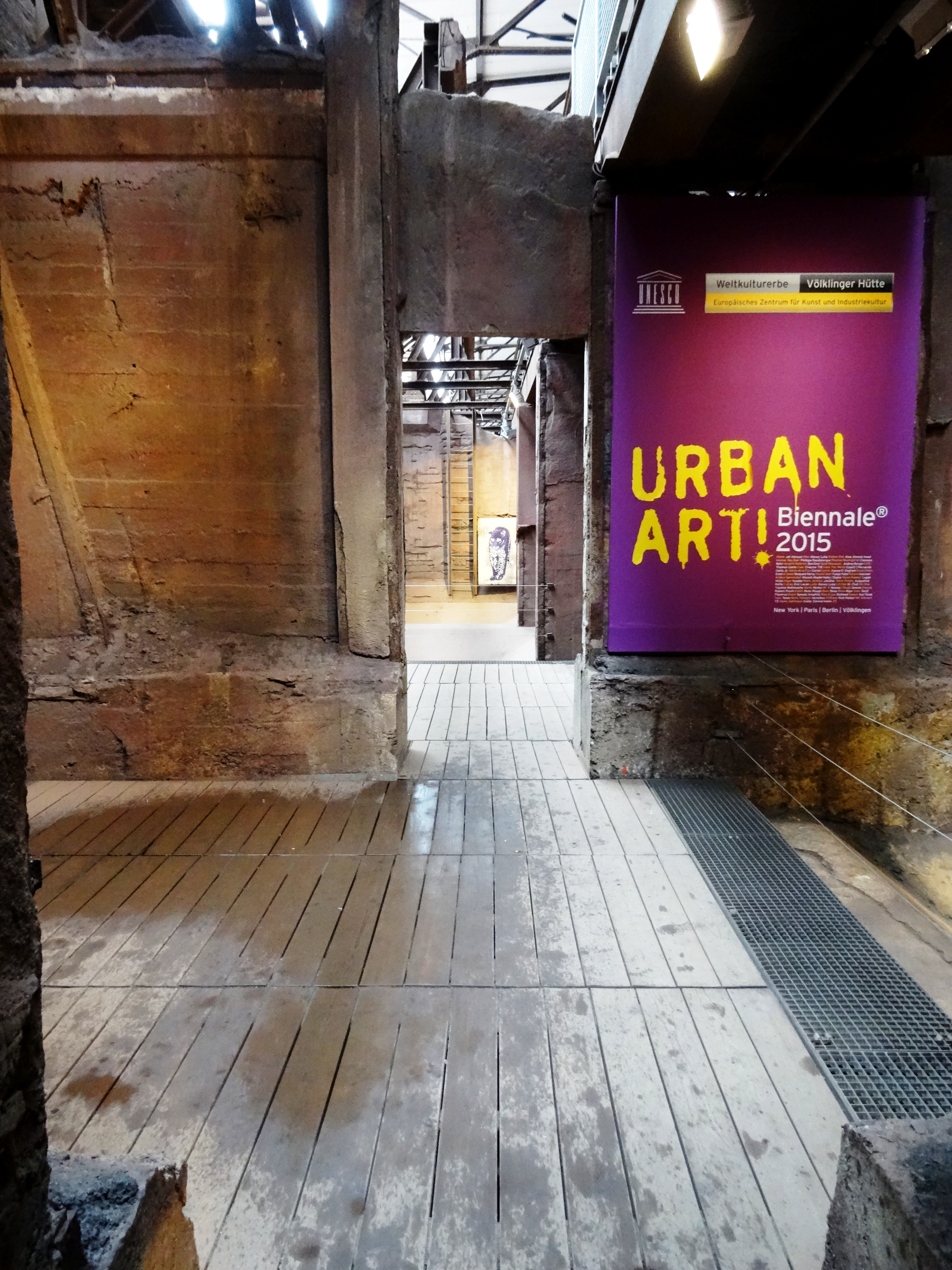
Part of the exhibition area in Völklingen Ironworks

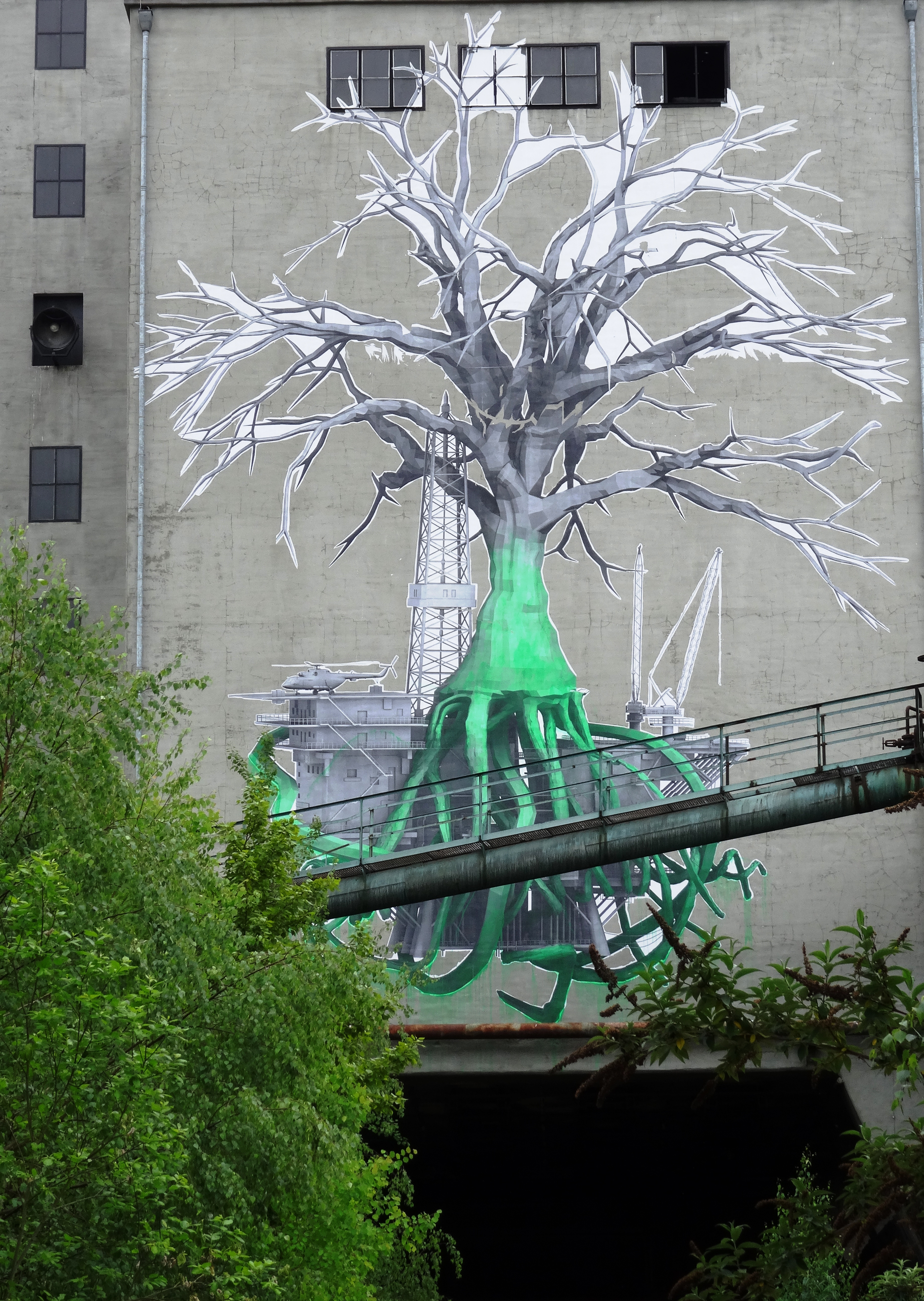
Urban art biennial 2015. Artist: Ludo "Tree of Life"

UrbanArt (L. urbanus [of the city], originating in turn from urbs [city]) refers to a biennale, which has set its goal to clarify the current positions of this relatively new art movement, document its development in a two-yearly rhythm and provide an overview of the world scene in UrbanArt. The European Centre for Art and Industry Culture at UNESCO World Cultural Heritage Site at the Völklingen Ironworks is hosting it in the Saarland town Völklingen.

== Description ==
Urban art is a recent art movement of the 21st century, whose impetus emanates from the city and which refers to city life. The art is largely practiced by artists living in an urban environment or those who have a preference for the city. UrbanArt combines Street art, Graffiti and other varieties of the modern art movement. As it is predominantly inspired by urban architecture and thematises an urban lifestyle, it frequently embraces all forms of the pictorial arts that surface in urban spaces. UrbanArt is a cultural phenomenon of our age, in no way a new art form.

In 2011 the exhibition first took place with the title "UrbanArt - Graffiti 21. New York City, Paris, Berlin, Völklingen" in the huge industrial buildings of the UNESCO World Cultural Heritage Site at the Völklingen Ironworks. The idea came from Völklingen Ironworks general director Meinrad Maria Grewenig. He had already taken on Pop- and Op Art and shed light on their influence on UrbanArt in quite a number of comprehensive exhibitions at the World Cultural Heritage Site at the Völklingen Ironworks. Parallel to the exhibition in Völklingen a large-scale exhibition “Art in the streets” took place in the Museum of Contemporary Art, Los Angeles, which caused a worldwide sensation. The theme “Urban art” was en vogue. Thus was born the idea of a two-yearly survey on the development of Urban Art”.

In 2013 the second exhibition took place in the framework of the new Biennial. Its major emphasis focused on the development from its original street painting on to the opening of museums and art galleries to this new art movement. Over 40 international Urban art artists took part, which would become extremely successful for the World Cultural Heritage Site at the Völklingen Ironworks.

The next Biennial took place in 2015. With over 80 artists hailing from 21 countries and 6 continents including Shepard Fairey, Ceet Fouad, Fuego Fatal, JonOne, Ganzeer,Thomas Canto, Anders Gjennestad, Yazan Halwani, Logan Hicks, Mark Jenkins, the exhibition grew to twice its size compared to that of 2013. Furthermore, the podium for the Biennial was vastly extended, more rooms created a 10,000m² covered area and an open-air course (the Parcour) of more than 100,000m².
With UrbanArt artworks from the Arabian region and in particular from Egypt the 2015 Biennial placed emphasis on particular countries. In the “Arab Spring” graffiti and other forms of Street Art became a means of expression used in the fight against repression, social grievances and for freedom of expression in the Arab states and particularly in Egypt.

== Bibliography ==
- Urban Art - Graffiti 21. Ed. Meinrad Maria Grewenig. Heidelberg: Wunderhorn 2011. 93 pages, numerous coloured illustrations. ISBN 978-3-88423-372-6
- UrbanArt Biennale 2013. Ed. Meinrad Maria Grewenig. Heidelberg: Wunderhorn 2013. 96 pages, numerous coloured illustrations. ISBN 978-3-88423-438-9
- Rafael Schacter: The world atlas of street art and graffiti. Yale Univ. Pr., 2013. 400 pages, numerous colour illustrations. ISBN 978-0300199420
- Basma Hamdy u. Don Stone Karl: Walls of Freedom. Street art of the Egyptian Revolution. Berlin: From Here to Fame Publ., 2014. 268 pages numerous illustrations. ISBN 978-3-937946-47-4
- UrbanArt Biennale 2015. ed.: Meinrad Maria Grewenig. Heidelberg: Wunderhorn, 2015. 150 pages, numerous colour illustrations.
