= Max Zorn (artist) =

Dutch artist

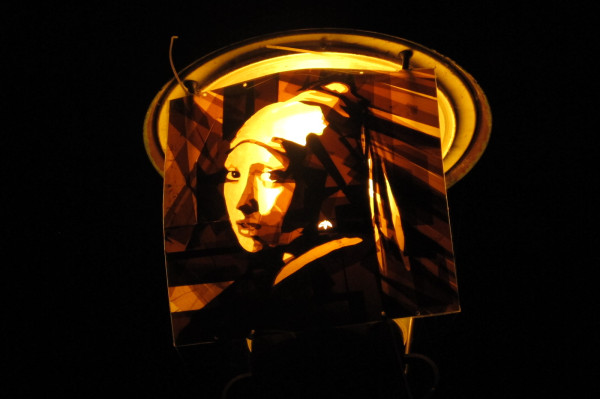
- A piece of tape art by Zorn
- Born: Amsterdam
- Known for: Street art, Urban art, Tape art
- Website: maxzorn.com

Max Zorn is a Dutch-German artist who has been active in street art at night and urban art since May 2011. His style is notable for its use of brown packing tape as a medium and cutting on acrylic glass with a scalpel to create portraits that need lighting from behind to be seen.

== Career ==
Born in Amsterdam, The Netherlands, Zorn's rise began in 2011 after publishing a two-minute self-made video on YouTube “Street Art by Max Zorn Making of Tape Art” showing how Zorn hangs his translucent tape art on street lamps. It was picked up by national and international media, and by April 2012 Zorn created over 150 works of tape art.

Zorn's first solo show was held in downtown Paris by 2012 in a vintage ballroom, and in that same year he was invited by the Sovereign Art Foundation to feature his first art fair exhibition and live performance at Art Basel Hong Kong which was sold as a unique original for a price that doubled the artwork's value. His in-house gallery Stick Together has exclusively exhibited his work annually since 2013 in Miami during Art Basel Miami week. Their first Miami exhibition together was held inside Wood Tavern, a small bar in the heart of Wynwood Art District that sold out in two days. Stick Together Gallery has since exhibited Zorn's solo showcase of new work at Aqua Art Miami and most recently SCOPE Miami Beach. He has sold out his entire solo exhibitions in Miami with Stick Together Gallery to date.

Zorn has worked on large-scale tape art projects with festivals like Amsterdam Light Festival in The Netherlands, the Living Arts Festival in Bangkok, Dubai Canvas in Dubai, and the South By Southwest festival in Austin, Texas. His live artwork performances and pieces have been featured and collected from museums such as Museum of Urban and Contemporary Art in Munich, EYE Filmmuseum, the Amsterdam Museum and The Dutch Resistance Museum in Amsterdam, the Cornell Art Museum at Old School Square, and the international museum franchise Ripley's Believe It Or Not. His artworks have sold on auction at Tajan Auction House and Digard Auction Company in Paris, Chiswick Auctions in London and Julien's auction in Los Angeles.

== Influences ==
Zorn’s settings and themes are influenced by a combination of classic novels, nostalgic history and film noir blended together by sepia tones of brown tape illuminated from behind. Zorn says he also finds inspiration from characters in novels produced by writers from The Lost Generation specifically Ernest Hemingway, John Steinbeck, and Tom Wolfe. His fascination with American cityscapes began as a child when his bedroom wallpaper was the New York City skyline.

== Works ==
Zorn's work has been placed in Key West, Florida, Canada and Hong Kong. Through his project Stick Together, his work has also been put on street lamps by fans worldwide, with large-scale street art installed in multiple windowpanes in locations like coffeeshop De Dampkring in Amsterdam, The Netherlands.

In collaboration with Scotch Tape, Max Zorn created the largest outdoor tape art installation he ever made out of brown packing tape, a 40-square-foot freestanding illuminated artwork titled "Huckleberry" for the South By Southwest festival in Austin, Texas, in 2016. His most-valued work sold for $30,000 - a three-panel triptych called "Floating in Time" created in 2018.

In a 2016 TEDx Talk in Munich, Germany, Stick Together Gallery owner Audrey Sykes explained that Max Zorn tape artworks have multiple facets, and the simple concept of a universal medium like tape being used in a creative way can be seen as contemporary art, upcycling art, and help a larger audience understand art because of its "wow" factor.

== Stick Together ==
Max Zorn is the founder and creator of the project Stick Together, an online game that spreads street art around the world for free. In 2012 Stick Together became the official name of the in-house gallery that has exclusive access to Max Zorn artworks and at times doubles as an artist agency and representative. Based in Amsterdam, Stick Together Gallery also exhibits online and with art fairs globally.
