= Völklingen Ironworks =

UNESCO World Heritage Site
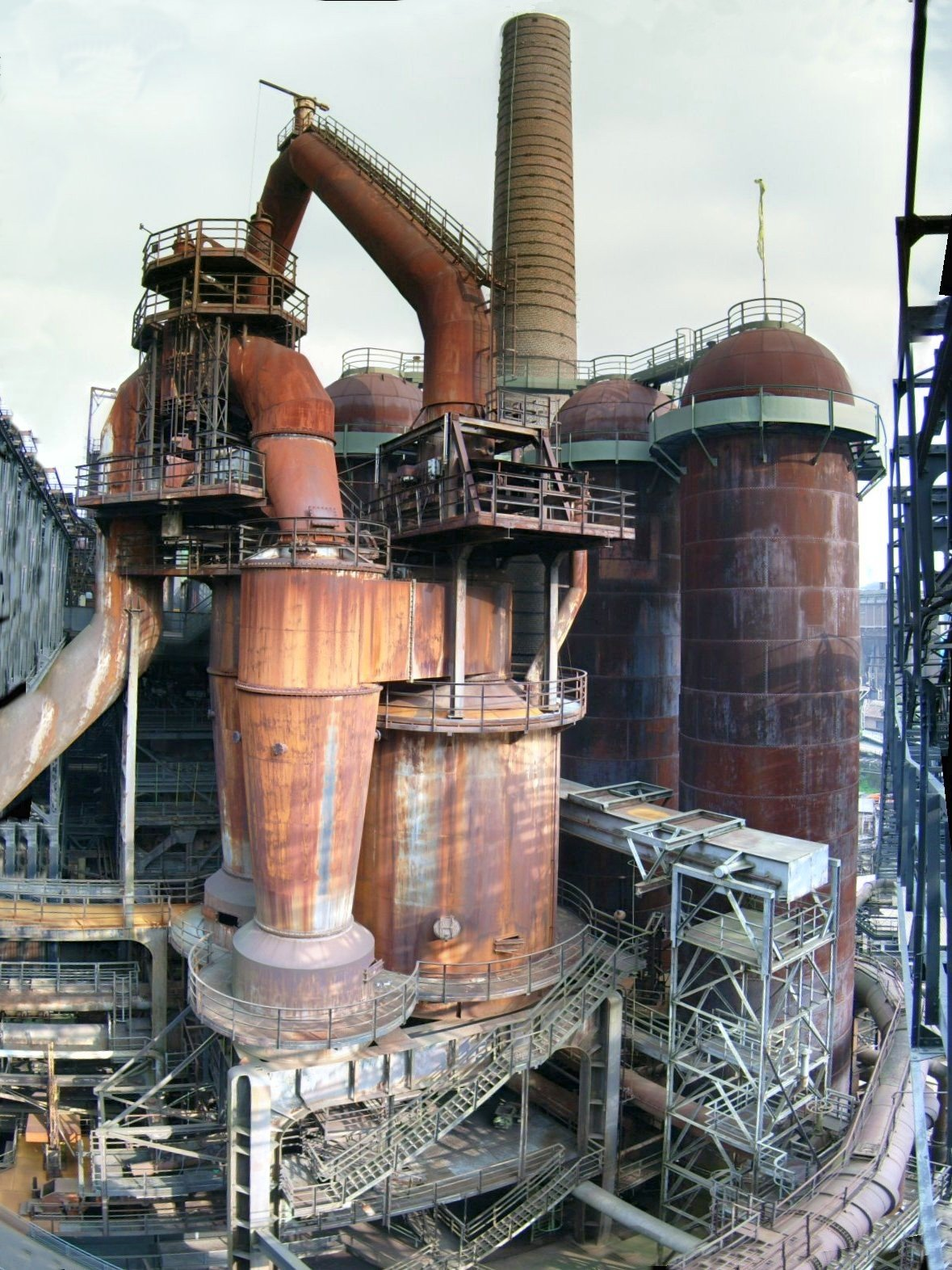

- Location within Germany Location within Saarland
- Location: Völklingen, Saarbrücken, Saarland, Germany
- Criteria: Cultural: (ii), (iv)
- Reference: 687
- Inscription: 1994 (18th Session)
- Area: 7.46 ha (18.4 acres)
- Website: voelklinger-huette.org/en/home
- Coordinates: 49°14′40″N 6°51′0″E

The Völklingen Ironworks (German: Völklinger Hütte) is a former blast furnace complex located in the German town of Völklingen, Saarland. Pig iron production occurred at the site from 1882 through 1986. As one of the only intact ironworks surviving from the 19th and early-20th centuries in Europe and North America, it was declared a UNESCO World Heritage Site in 1994 because of its exceptional preservation and its testimony to ferrous metallurgy and the Industrial Revolution. In addition, the site is an anchor point of the European Route of Industrial Heritage (ERIH).

== History ==
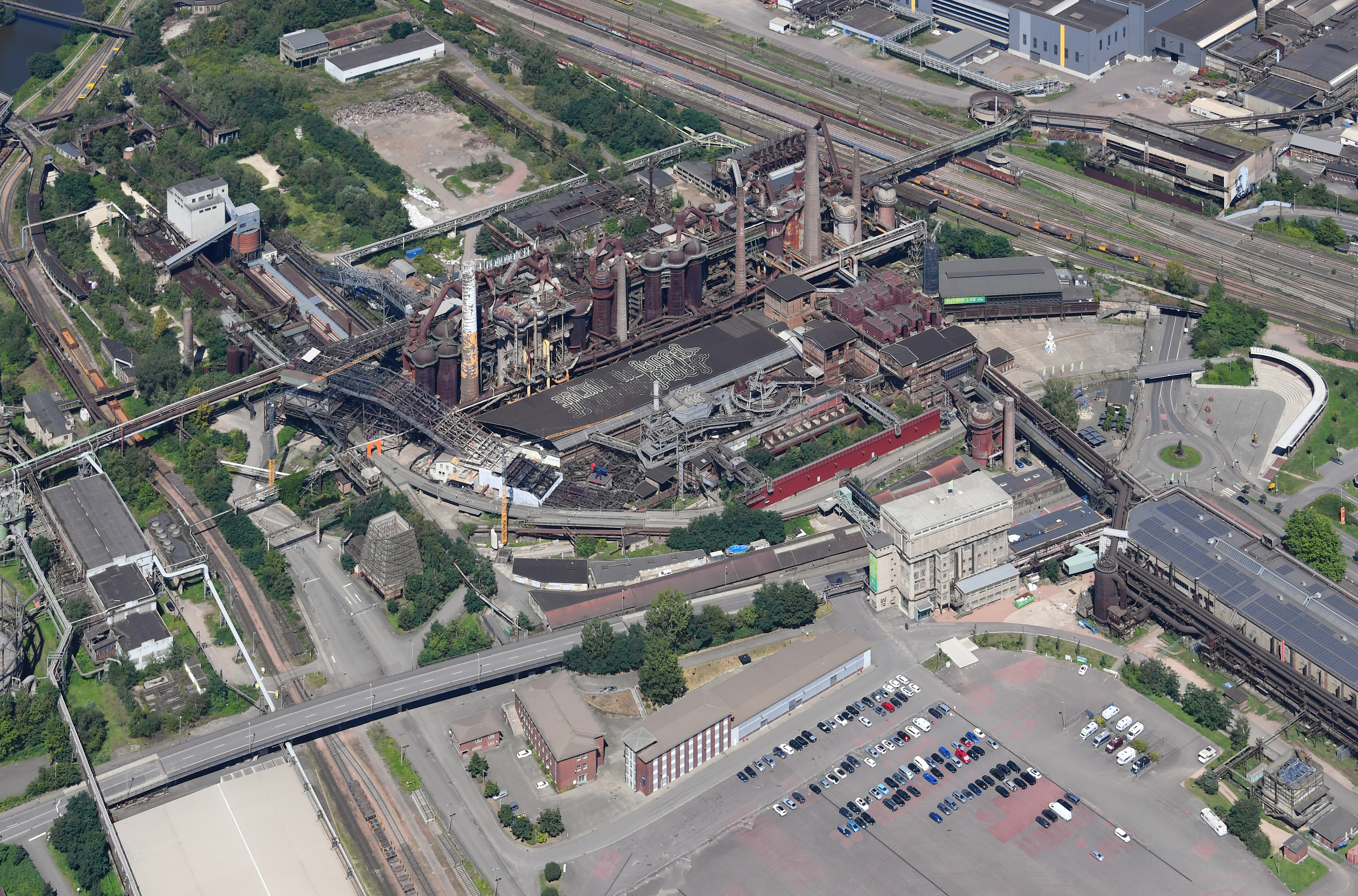
Aerial view of the Völklingen Ironworks

In 1873, Julius Buch planned and built a steel works near Völklingen on the banks of the Saar river. However, the steel works ceased operation only 6 years later, and were acquired by Karl Röchling. in 1881, construction on a blast furnace for producing iron began, and two years later the first smelter began operation. Four new furnaces were added between 1885 and 1893, and a coking plant was added in 1897. In 1900, the first gas-blowing engines were introduced to the Völklingen Ironworks, making it the first large-scale ironworks to use furnace gas to operate the blast furnaces. By the 1910s, the Völklingen Ironworks was Germany's largest producer of steel beams. A large conveyor belt system was installed in the plant, and the technology used at the ironworks became a model for other factories across the world during the early 20th century.

With a shortage of labor during and after World War I, up to 1,446 people from territories occupied by Germany (with most of them from Russia and Belgium) were forced to work involuntarily at the Völklingen Ironworks between 1915 and 1918. Over 143 of these laborers died during that time. Forced labor was again used in World War II, when a total of 12,393 people (including prisoners of war and civilians deported from the Soviet Union) worked at the plant in brutal and inhumane conditions.

After World War II, only minor maintenance was conducted until the plant closed in 1986 during the economic steel crisis. The ironworks retains its 1930s-era appearance today, with intact blast furnaces and the original coking plant.

On the 17th of december 1994 the Völklingen Ironworks was pronounced a World Cultural Heritage Site by the UNESCO Commission in Phuket, Thailand. In the aftermath, the Stiftung Industriekultur (Industrial Culture Foundation) was founded at the beginning of 1996 with the aim of presenting the history of the Völklingen Ironworks and making the site culturally accessible.

Meinrad Maria Grewenig was the first General Director and Managing Director of the World Cultural Heritage Site Völklingen Ironworks. Ralf Beil has been the General Director of the World Cultural Heritage Site at the Völklingen Ironworks since 1 May 2020.

== Today ==
Today, the Völklinger Hütte is a museum and it is also a unique location for international exhibitions, festivals and concerts. The Ferrodrom is an interactive science center focusing on the making of iron. Visitors can tour the production areas. Huge gas machines stand in the blower hall. They were driven by blast furnace gas and generated the wind for the blast furnaces. Parts of the blower hall are used for exhibitions today.

The Völklingen Ironworks is also the venue for the UrbanArt Biennale. The UrbanArt Biennale is a biennial exhibition (since 2011) dealing with urban art. The aim of the Biennale is to highlight the current positions of this art movement, document its development and to give an overview of the world scene of Urban Art.

In 2012, the area was the venue of electro magnetic for the first time. As part of the ‘European Festival Awards’ in Groningen, The Netherlands. It was awarded ‘Best New Festival in Europe 2012’ and ran successfully until 2019.

== Exhibitions (selection) ==
- Prometheus (1998 / 1999)
- Leonardo da Vinci – Machine Man (2002 / 2003)
- IncaGold – 3000 Years of Advanced Civilisations – Masterpieces from the Larco Museum Peru (2004 / 2005)
- Treasures from 1001 Nights – Fascination of the Orient (2005 / 2005)
- Power&Pomp. Europe's splendour in the 19th century (2006 / 2007
- Duane Hanson – Sculptures of the American Dream (20. Oktober 2007 bis 12. Mai 2008)
- The Celts – Druids. Princes. Warriors. The life of the Celts in the Iron Age (2010 / 2011)
- UrbanArt – Graffiti 21. (2011 / 2011)
- Mel Ramos – 50 Years of Pop Art (2011 / 2012)
- Allen Jones – Off the Wall – 1957–2009 (2012 / 2013)
- Mythos Ferrari – Photographs by Günter Raupp (2012 / 2013)
- UrbanArt Biennial 2013 (2013 / 2013)
- Generation Pop – hear me! feel me! love me! (2013 | 2014)
- Egypt – Gods. Humans. Pharaohs. (2014 / 2015)
- UrbanArt Biennial 2015 (2015 / 2015)
- Buddha – Collectors open their treasure chambers. 232 masterpieces of Buddhist art spanning 2,000 years. (2016 / 2017)
- Inca – Gold. Power. God (2017 / 2018)
- UrbanArt Biennial 2017 (2017 / 2017)
- Legende Queen Elisabeth II. – Luciano Pelizzari Collection (2018 / 2019)
- Banksy's Dismaland and Others – Photographs by Barry Cawston (2018 / 2018)
- UrbanArt Biennial 2019. (2019 / 2019)
- Pharaoh's Gold: 3,000 Years of Ancient Egypt (2019 /2020)
- Mon Trésor. Europe's Treasure in Saarland. (2021 / 2021)
- THE WORLD OF MUSIC VIDEOS. (2022)
- Urban Art Biennale 2022 (2022)
- JULIAN ROSEFELDT. WHEN WE ARE GONE (2022 / 2023)
- Jens Harder. THE STORY OF PLANET A (2023 / 2024)
- DER DEUTSCHE FILM (2023 / 2024)
- Urban Art Biennale 2024 (2024)
- THE TRUE SIZE OF AFRICA (2024 / 2025)
- X-RAY. The Power of Roentgen Vision (2025 / 2026)

== Gallery ==
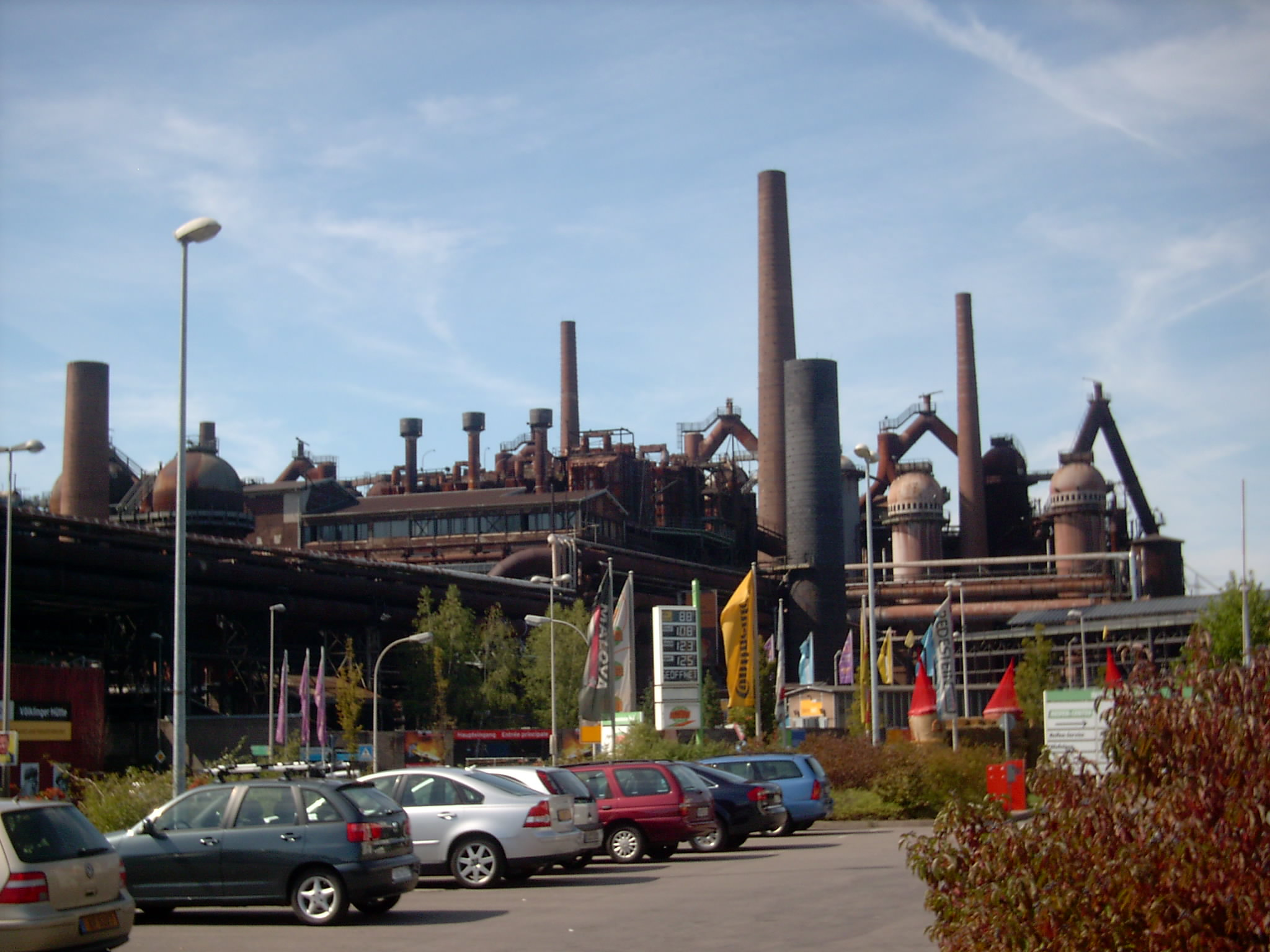

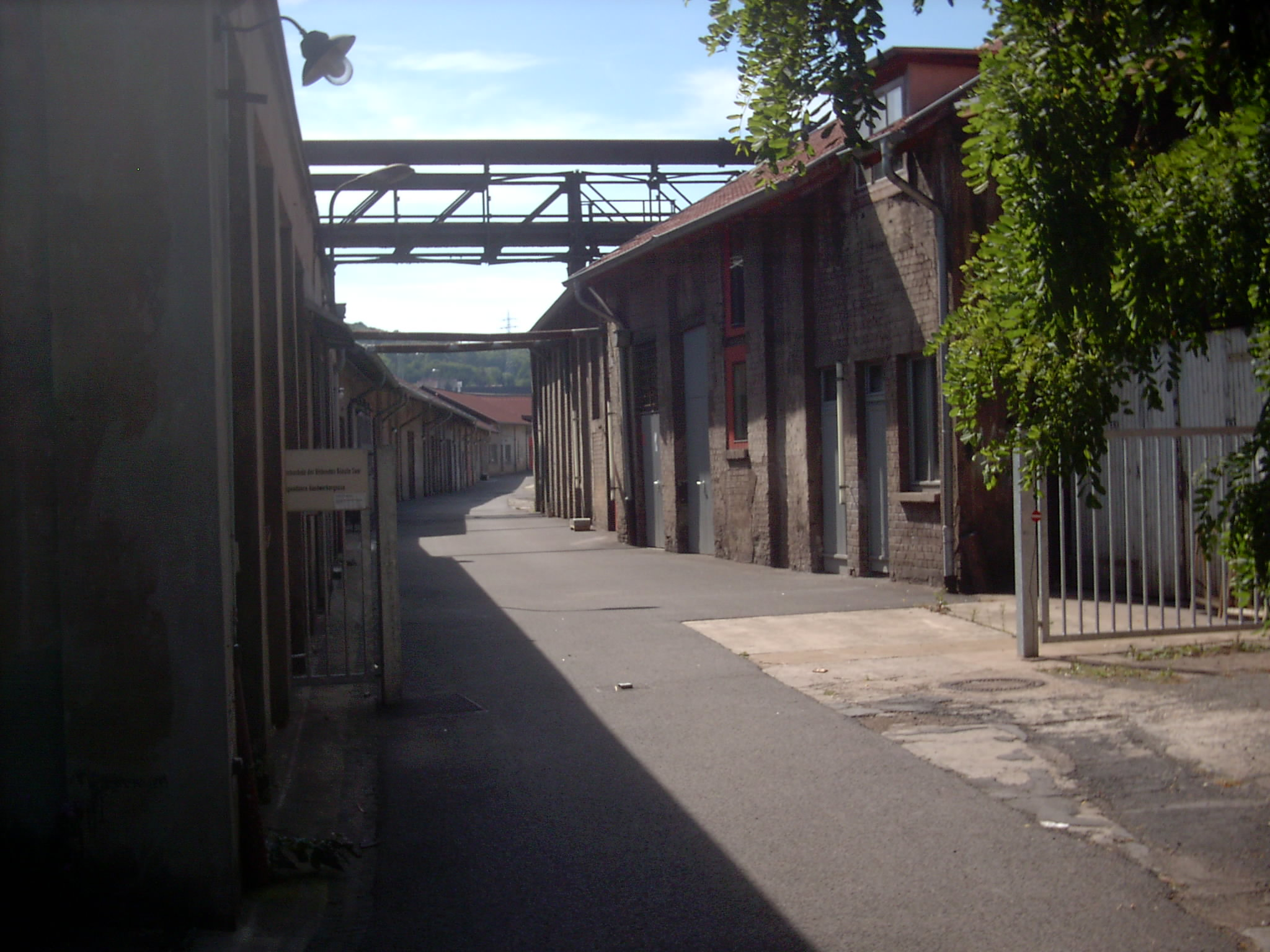

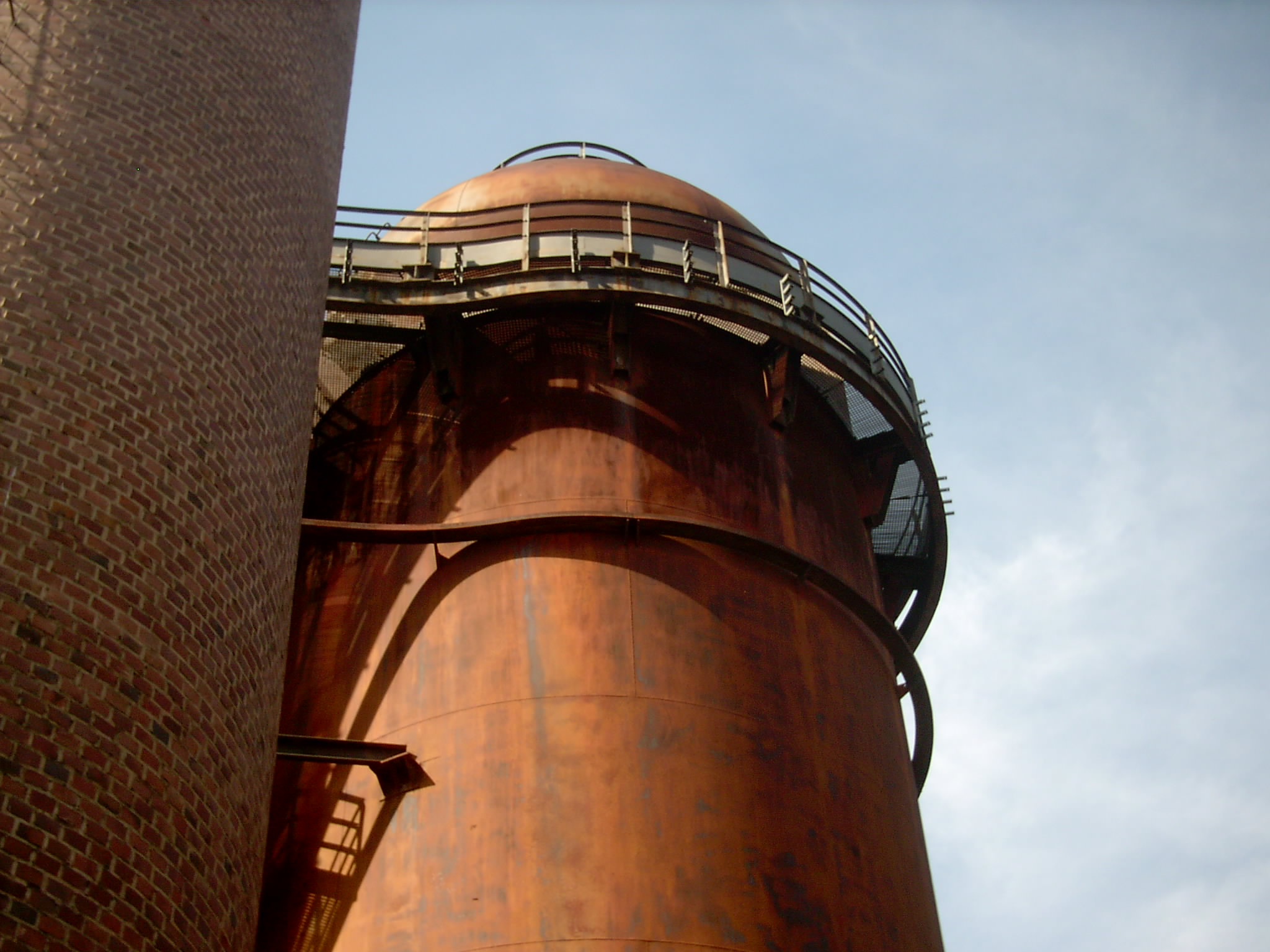

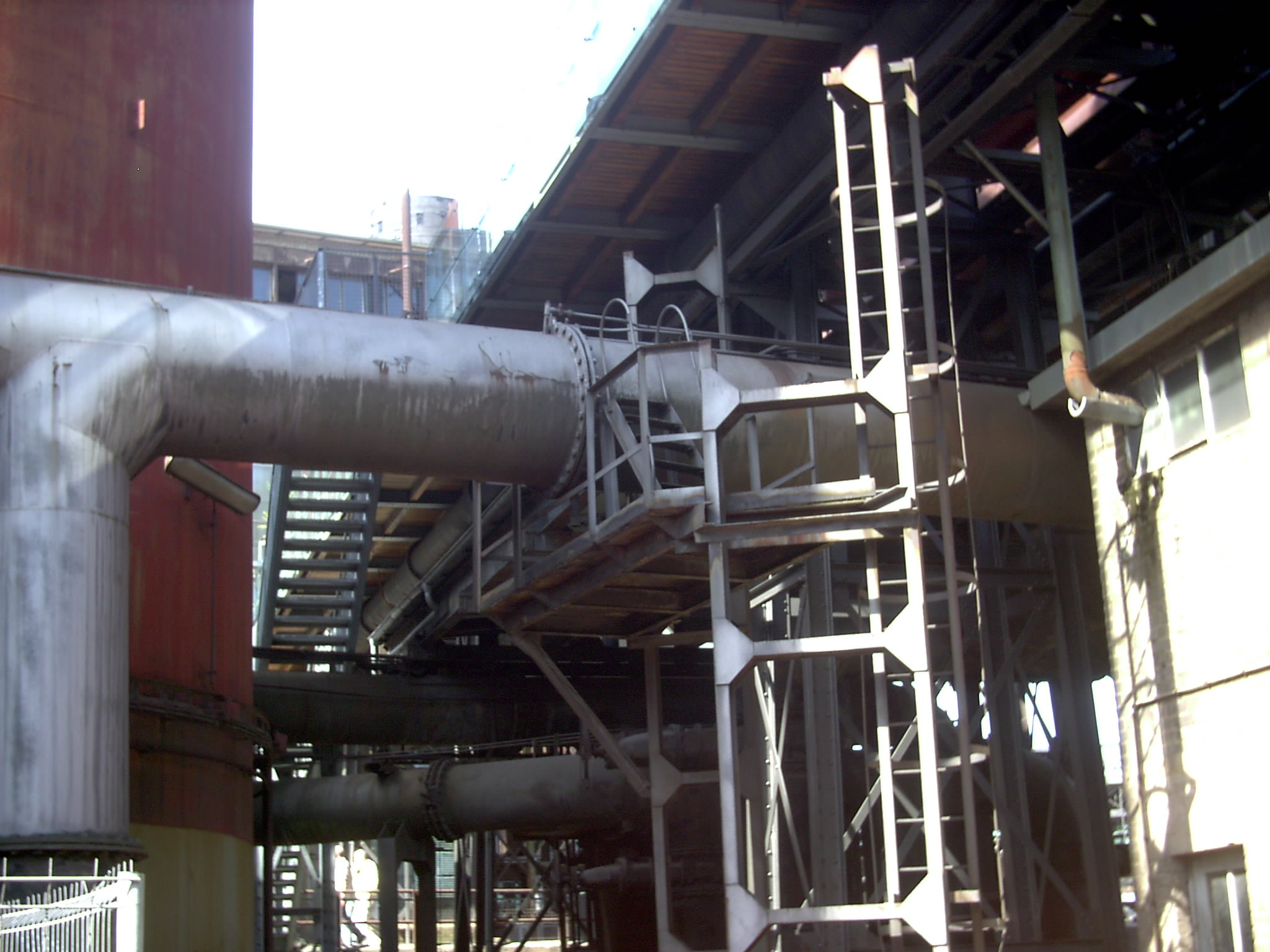

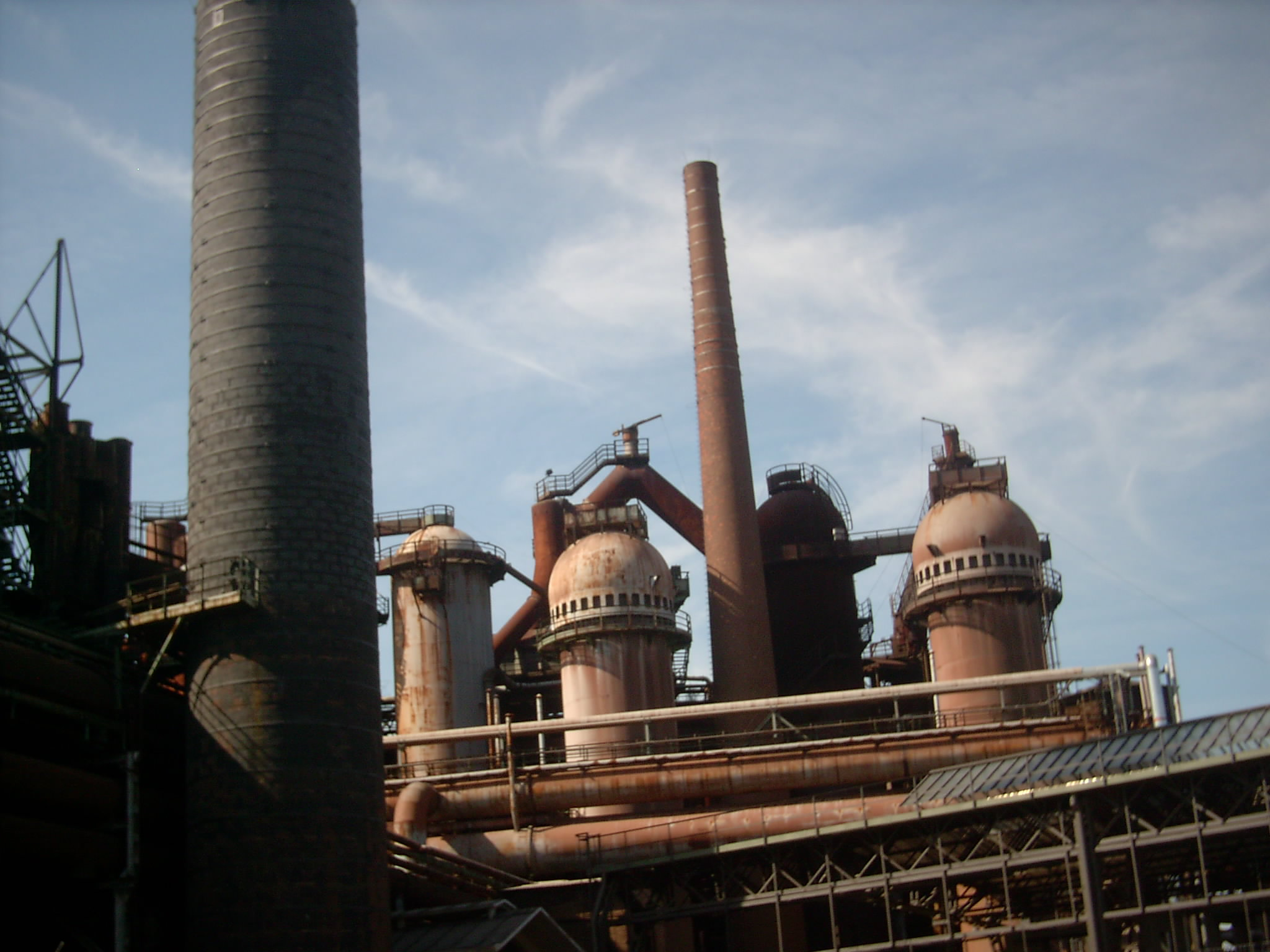

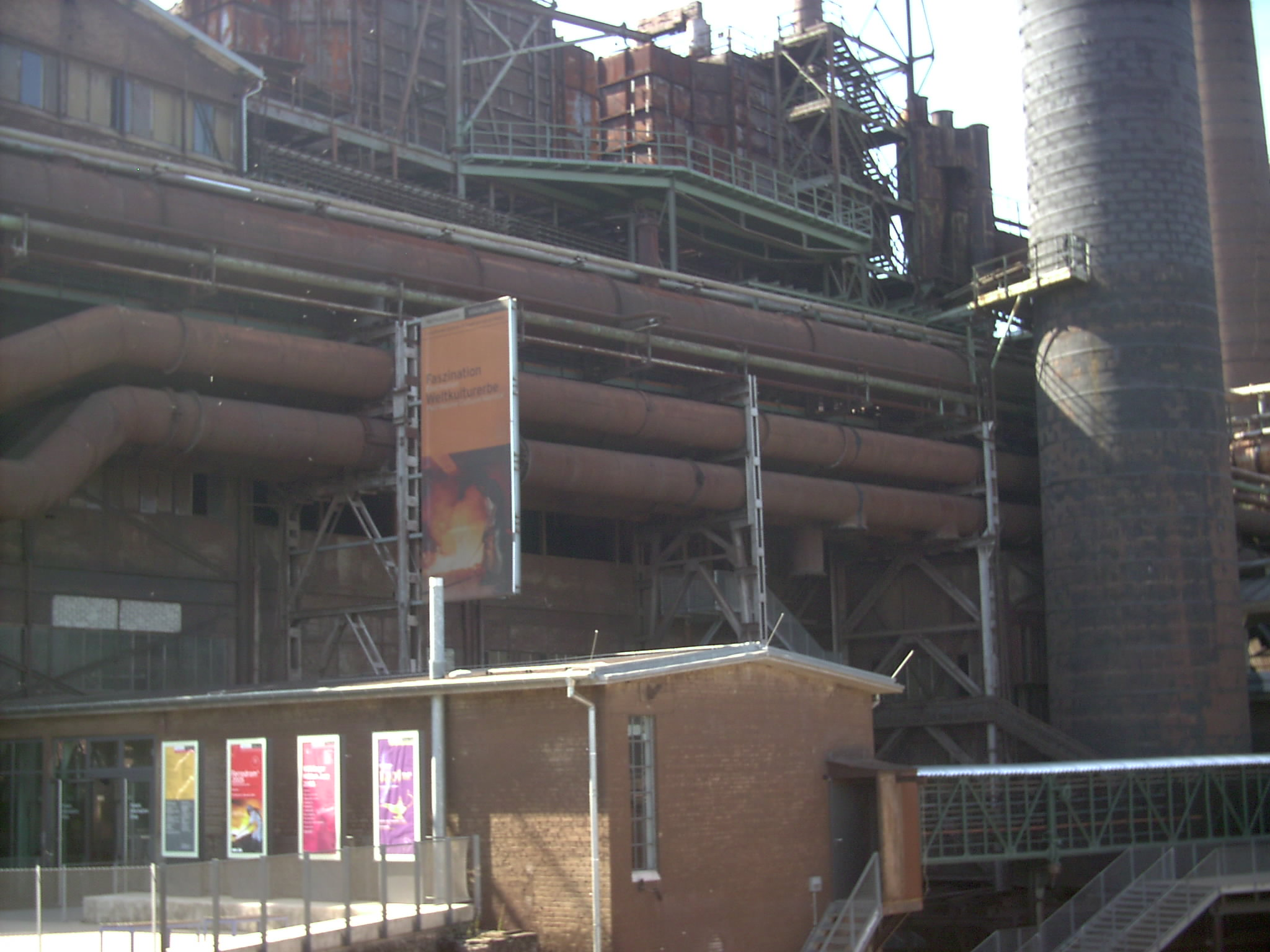

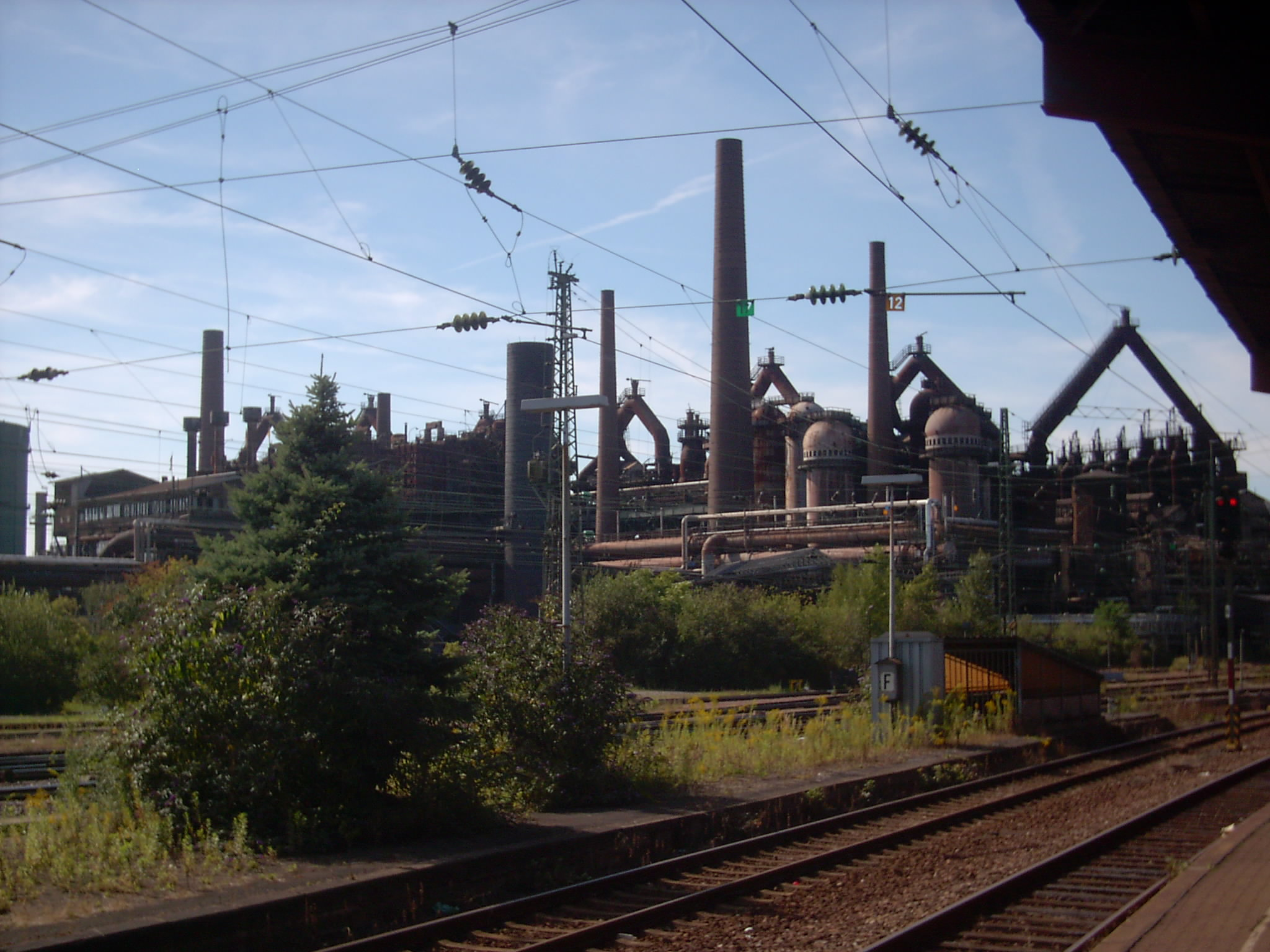

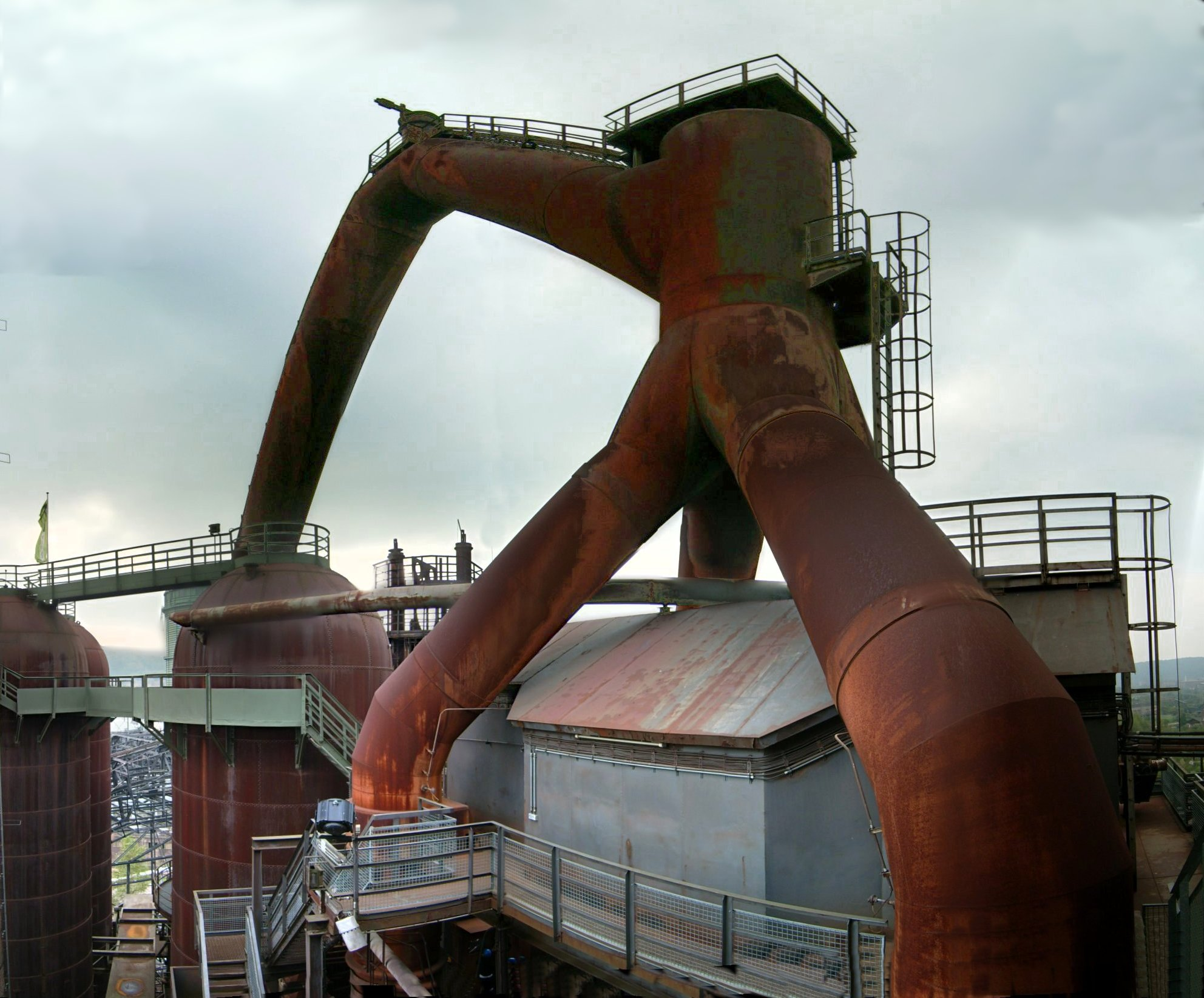

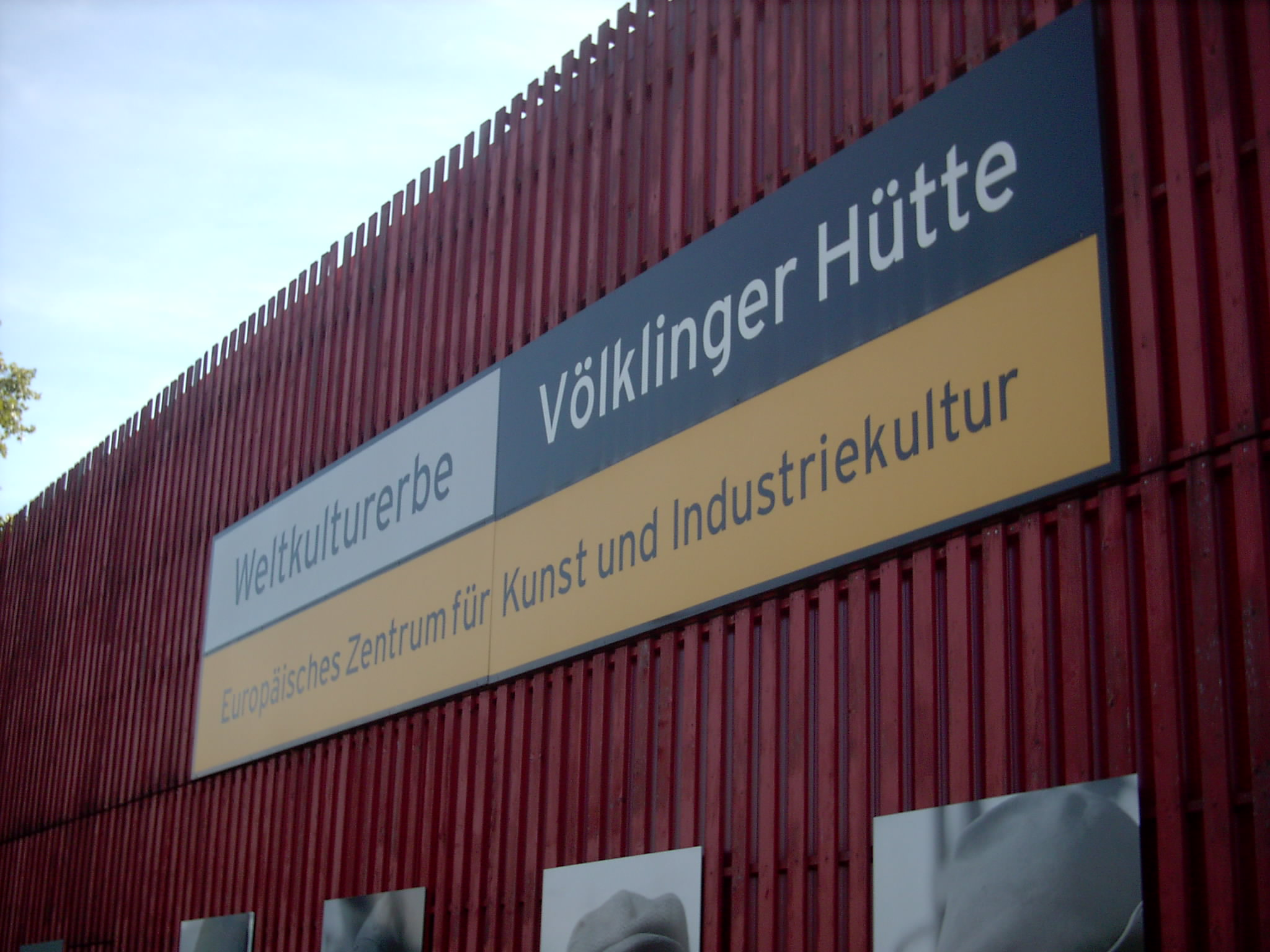

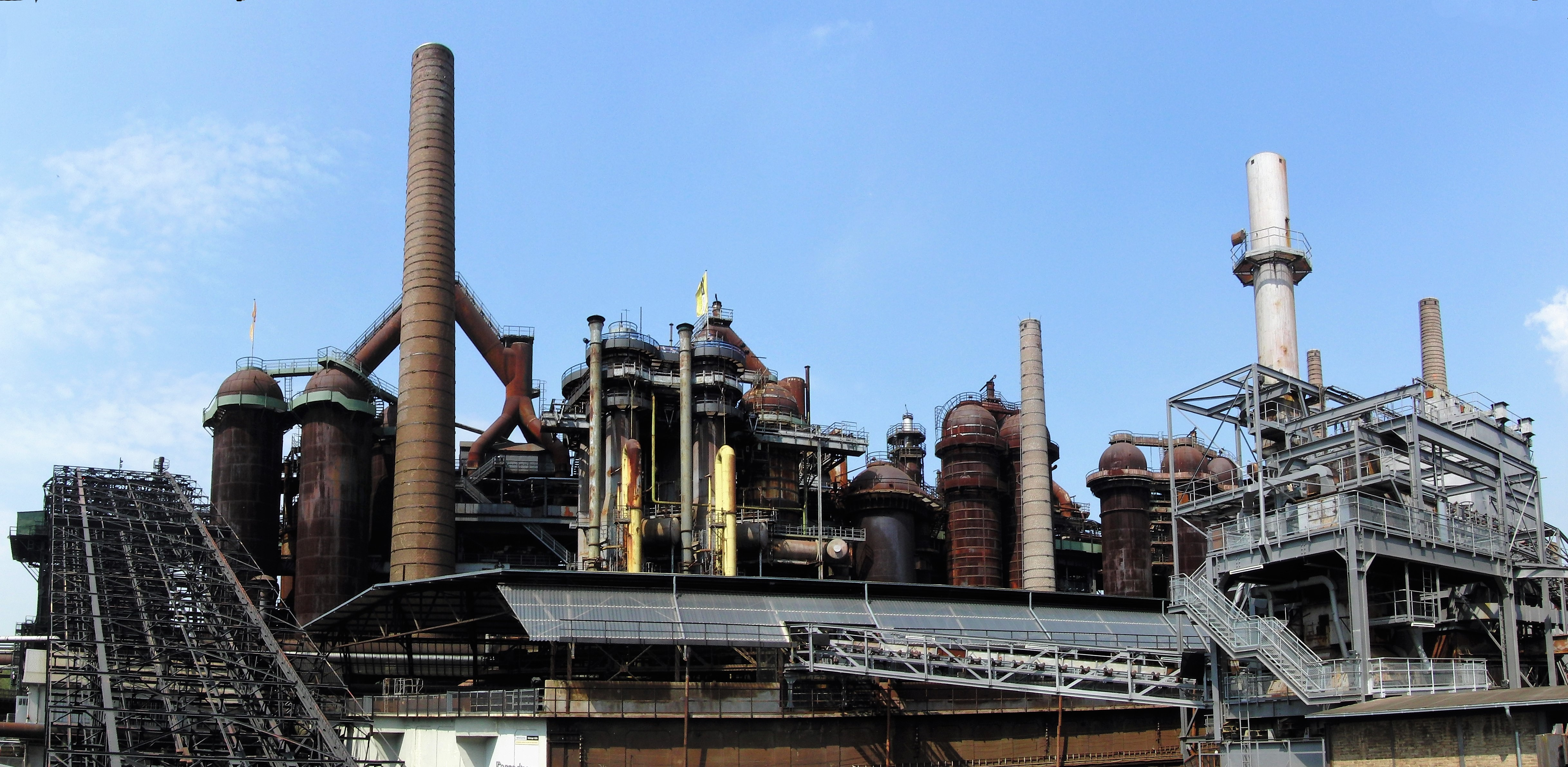

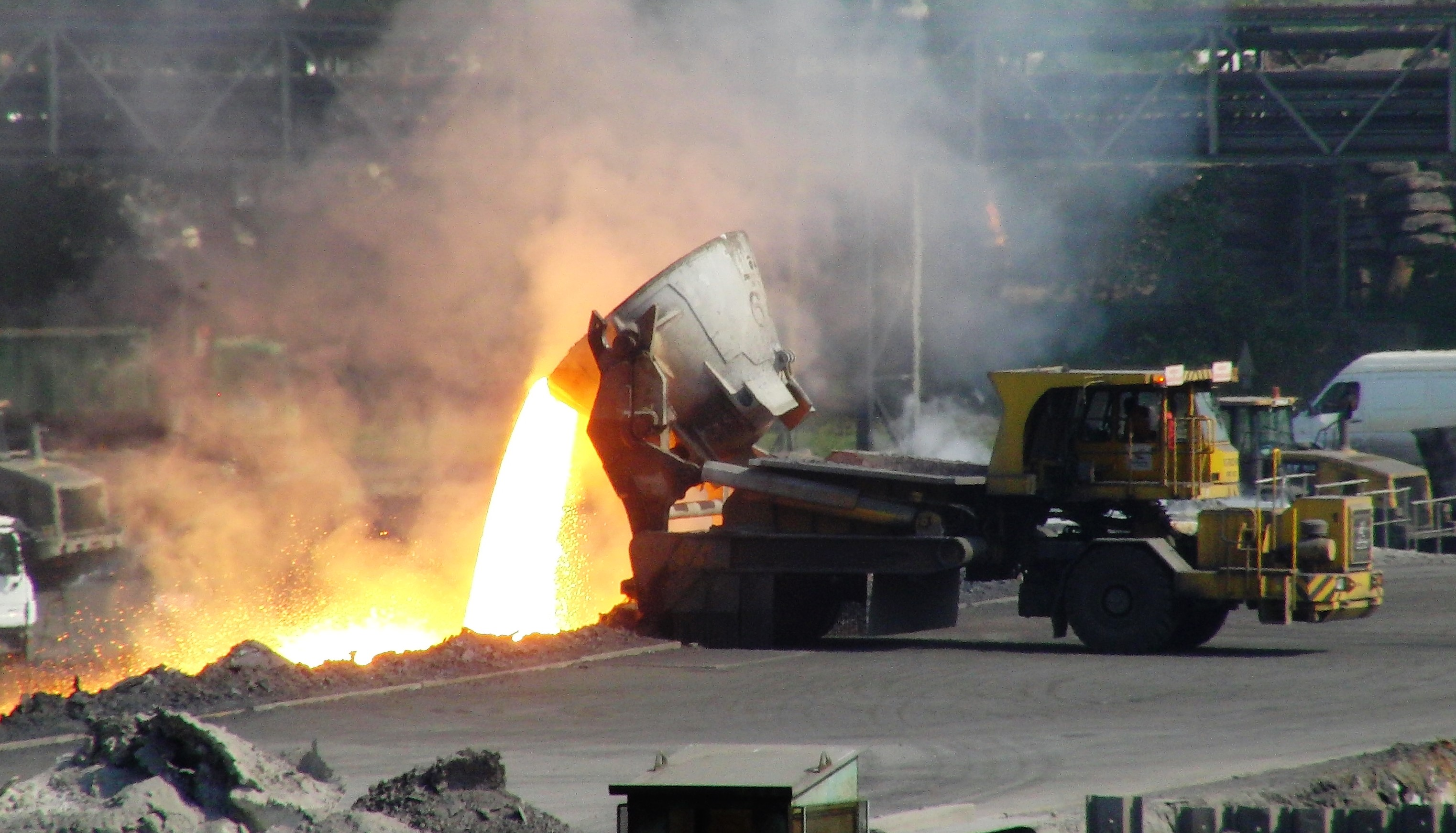

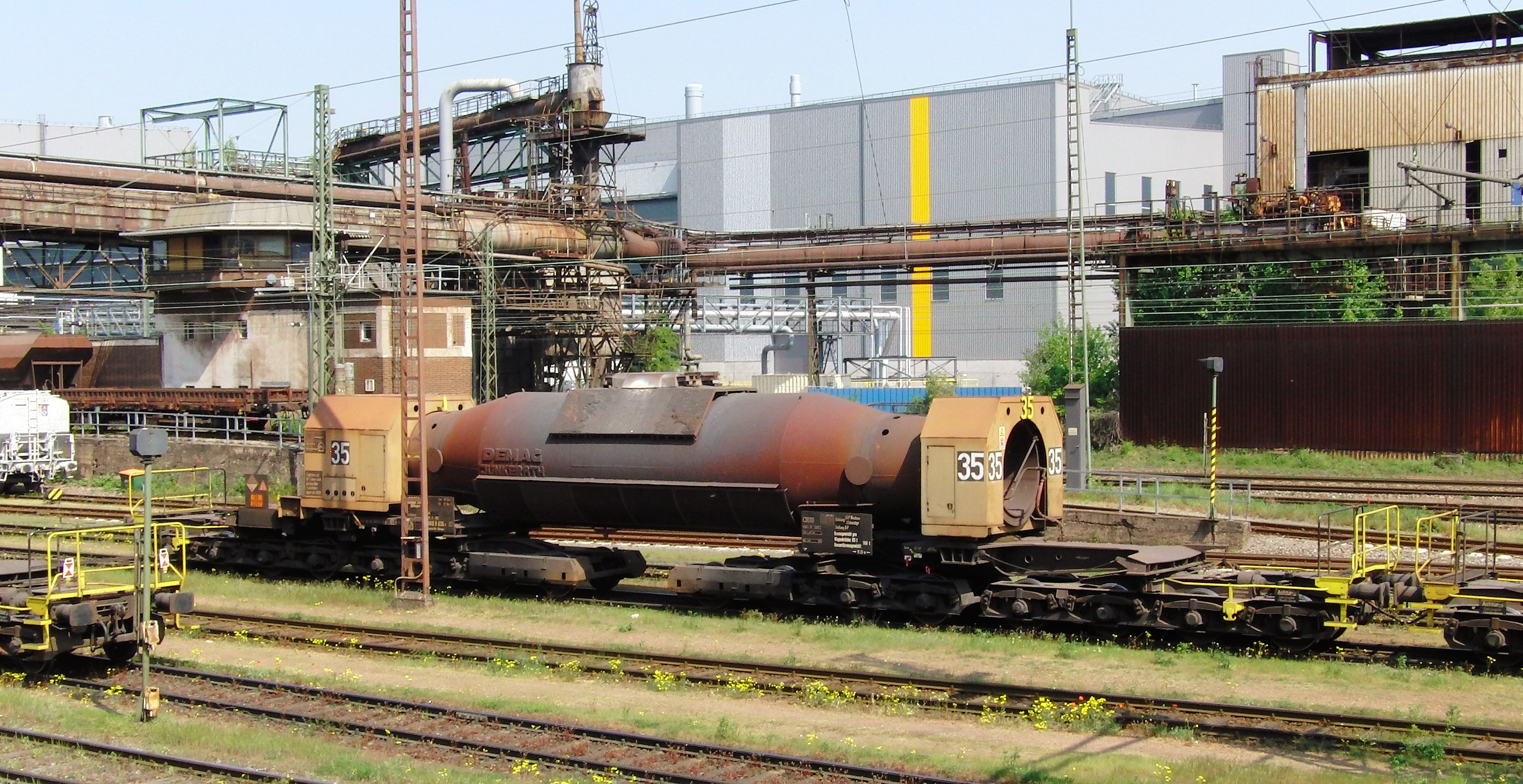

== See also ==
- List of preserved historic blast furnaces

== Notes ==
- This article is based on the entry Völklinger Hütte in the German Wikipedia.
