= Urban art =

Visual art genre

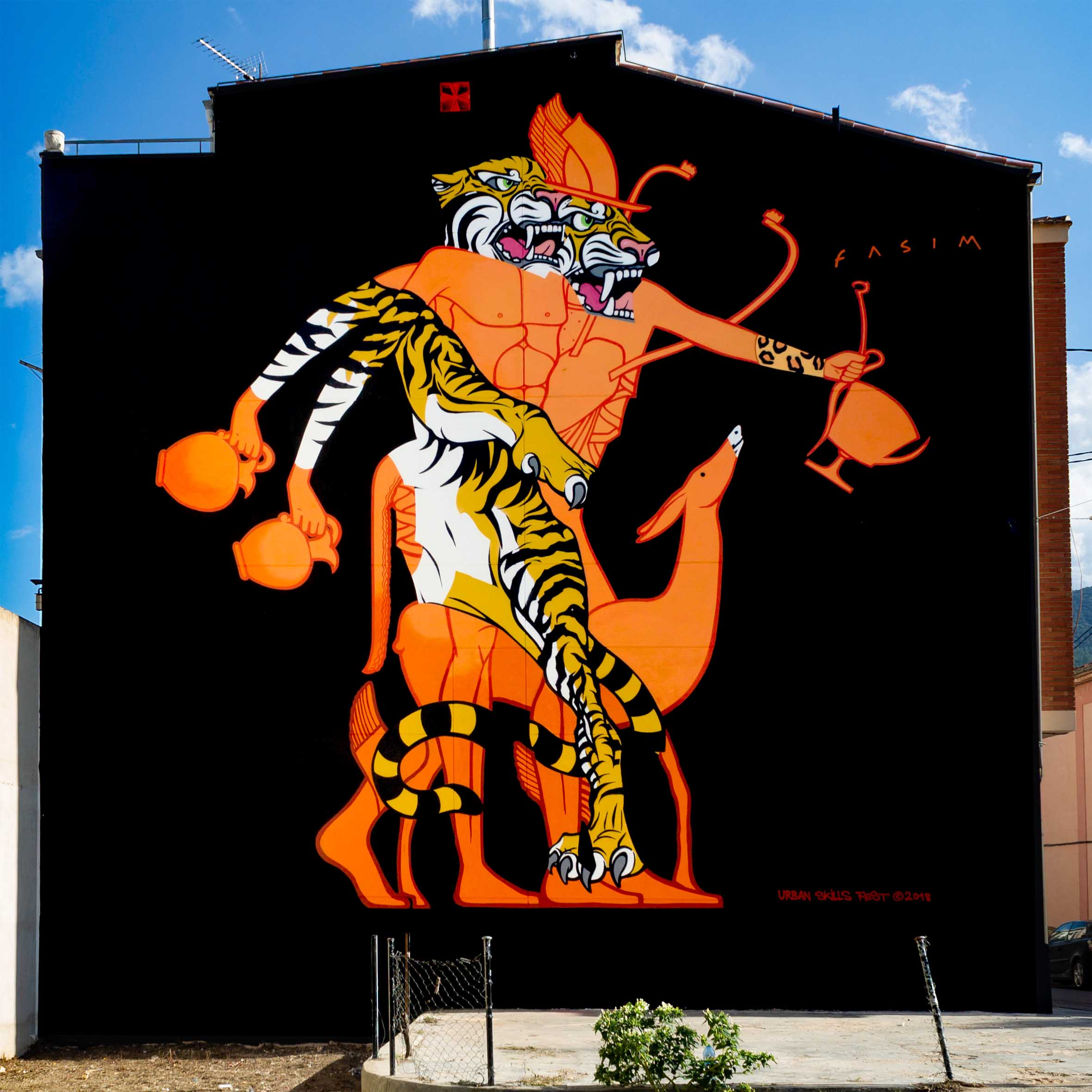
A big wall of urban art in Alcoi by Fasim. 2018 / Valencia, Spain.

Urban art combines street art, guerrilla art, and graffiti and is often used to summarize all visual art forms arising in urban areas, often inspired by urban architecture and contemporary urban lifestyles.

Because the urban arts are characterized by existing in the public space, they are often viewed as vandalism and destruction of private property.

Although urban art started at the neighborhood level, where many people of different cultures live together, it is an international art form with an unlimited number of uses nowadays. Many urban artists travel from city to city and have social contacts all over the world. The notion of 'Urban Art' developed from street art which is primarily concerned with graffiti culture. Urban art represents a broader cross-section of artists that, in addition to covering traditional street artists working in formal gallery spaces, also cover artists using more traditional media but with a subject matter that deals with contemporary urban culture and political issues. In Paris, Le Mur is a public museum of urban art.

== In the mainstream ==
Though starting as an underground movement, urban artists like Banksy and Adam Neate have now gained mainstream status and have, in turn, propelled the urban art scene into popular culture. Perceptions have started to change as urban movements such as graffiti slowly gain acceptance from the public. A confirmation of street art's new mainstream status can be, in part, confirmed by an invitation from the Tate calling upon artists to create outdoor pieces on the Thames side of the gallery in the summer of 2008.

The band Gorillaz uses an urban art style to promote their band. The band members are animated in a graffiti style.

== Notable urban artists not primarily associated with street art ==
- Eberhard Bosslet
- Tom Christopher
- Guy Denning
- Burhan Dogancay
- Nick Gentry
- Dave Kinsey
- Antony Micallef
- Jonathan Yeo

== See also ==
- Urban art biennial
- Urban culture
- Art graffiti
- Street Art
- Tape Art
- MONU - magazine on urbanism
- Urban Interventionism

== Urban art in Europe ==
=== Spain ===
In Spain, urban art, influenced by graffiti art and urban art from New York, was born first in the peripheral neighborhoods of large cities and in the towns of their metropolitan areas and then spread throughout the rest of the country. Currently Valencia, Madrid, Barcelona, Pontevedra, Zaragoza and Cuenca are important focuses of this discipline. The Aragonese city is a benchmark thanks to its Asalto urban culture festival, 5 which brings together artists from all over the world and performs interventions in the city. It is worth highlighting the rural city of La Bañeza, which has become the European city with the most works per square meter built.
