= Tape art =

Visual art practice using adhesive tape

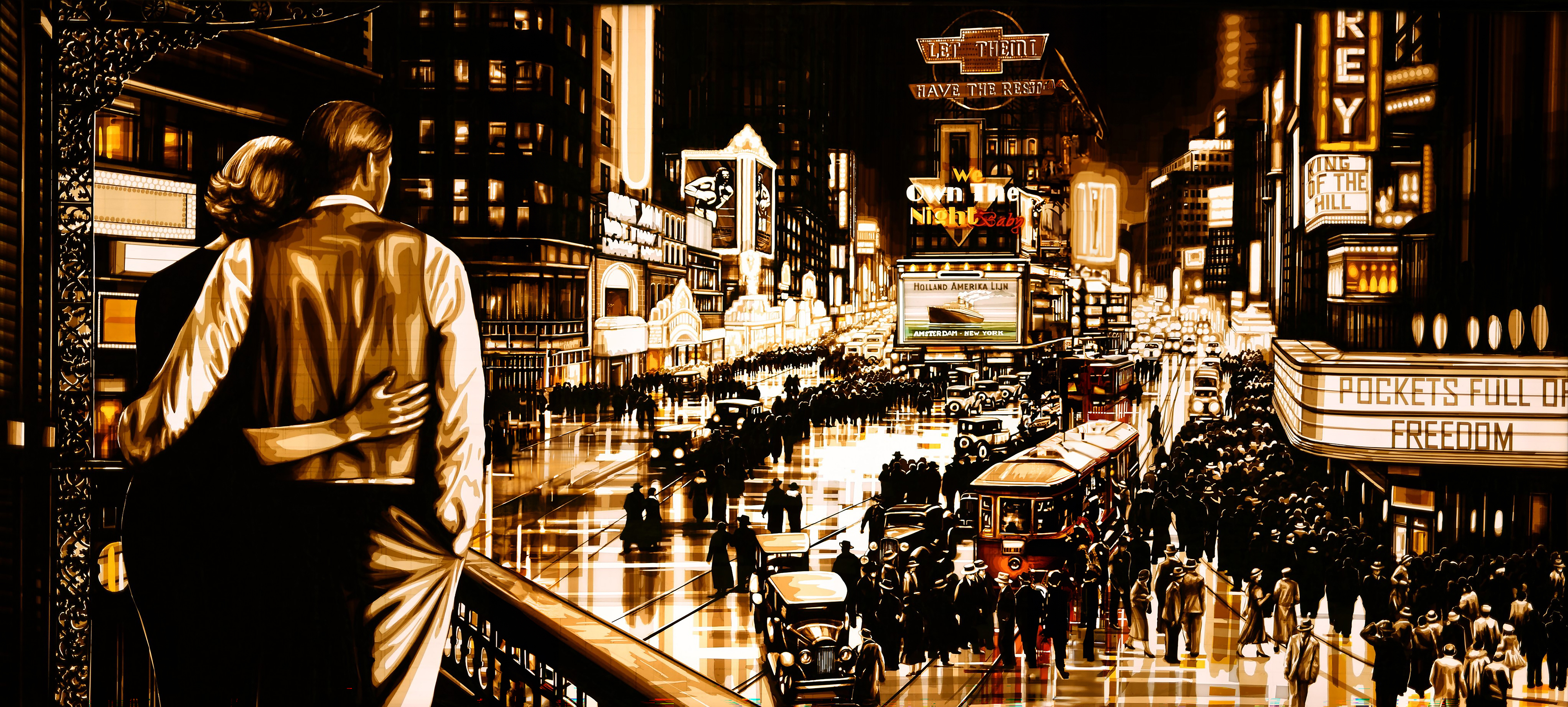
Backlit packing-tape artwork by Max Zorn.

Tape art is a contemporary visual art practice in which pressure-sensitive adhesive tape is used as a primary medium to create images, patterns, installations and sculptural forms. Tape-based works range from temporary murals and participatory public artworks made with low-adhesive tape to site-specific installations in coloured vinyl tape and three-dimensional works formed by casting and layering clear or translucent tapes.

The practice has developed in several distinct forms: temporary murals and collaborative drawings made with low-adhesive tape; site-specific installations in coloured vinyl tape; three-dimensional sculpture, including figures cast in clear packing tape and large structures visitors can enter; backlit images made by layering translucent tape; and street interventions.

== History ==
An early precedent is Piet Mondrian's New York City I (1941), an interlacing lattice of red, yellow, black and blue adhesive tapes, held since 1980 by the Kunstsammlung Nordrhein-Westfalen in Düsseldorf. In 1963 the Lettrist artist Gil J. Wolman devised what he called Scotch Art, using adhesive tape to lift strips of print from newspapers and magazines and transferring them to canvas or wood; the Museo Reina Sofía describes the process as "tearing off strips of printed matter and Scotch-taping them to wood or fabric" to subvert the language of the mass media.

As a distinct collaborative and public-art practice, tape art emerged in the late 20th century in parallel with street art and site-specific installation. An early example is Tape Art, a collective based in Providence, Rhode Island, established in 1989, which uses low-adhesive tape to create temporary, collaborative, room-scale drawings and murals.

Tape also entered museum-scale installation art in the 1990s. Scottish artist Jim Lambie's recurring work Zobop (begun 1999), made from strips of coloured vinyl tape applied across floors and stairs, changes each time in response to the shape of the space and has been exhibited in museum contexts including the Museum of Modern Art in New York.

In the 2000s, artists working in public space expanded tape art into three-dimensional casting and sculpture. In a 2006 profile, The Washington Post described street artist Mark Jenkins as best known for figurative tape sculptures cast from his own body with clear packing tape and installed in public without authorization.

Tape sculpture by Mark Jenkins.

== Aesthetics and interpretation ==
Writers and curators have often discussed tape-based work in relation to drawing, installation and the experience of moving through space. In describing Jim Lambie's tape installations, the Vancouver Art Gallery notes that Zobop can “blur the boundaries between sculpture, installation and drawing” and can activate movement through architectural space. Scholarship on temporary urban interventions has similarly framed tape-based street works as forms of ephemeral public art that interrupt routine encounters and invite renewed attention to the built environment. In tape casting, the tape records the outer form of an object or body as a hollow, transparent shell once the original is removed. Jenkins has described clear packing tape as "like glass, at times like ice", reflective and light-capturing. In backlit tape images, the material properties of translucent tape make light integral to the finished work: the Delaware Art Museum describes Khaisman's process as creating “pictorial illusions” by layering packing tape over Plexiglass and light.

== Forms and techniques ==
=== Temporary murals and collaborative public artworks ===
A common form of tape art uses low-adhesive tape to create large murals and drawings directly on architectural surfaces. Works are often conceived as temporary and removed by peeling the tape from the surface after a set period. The collective Tape Art is a prominent representative of this approach and has staged projects that incorporate public participation during both installation and removal.

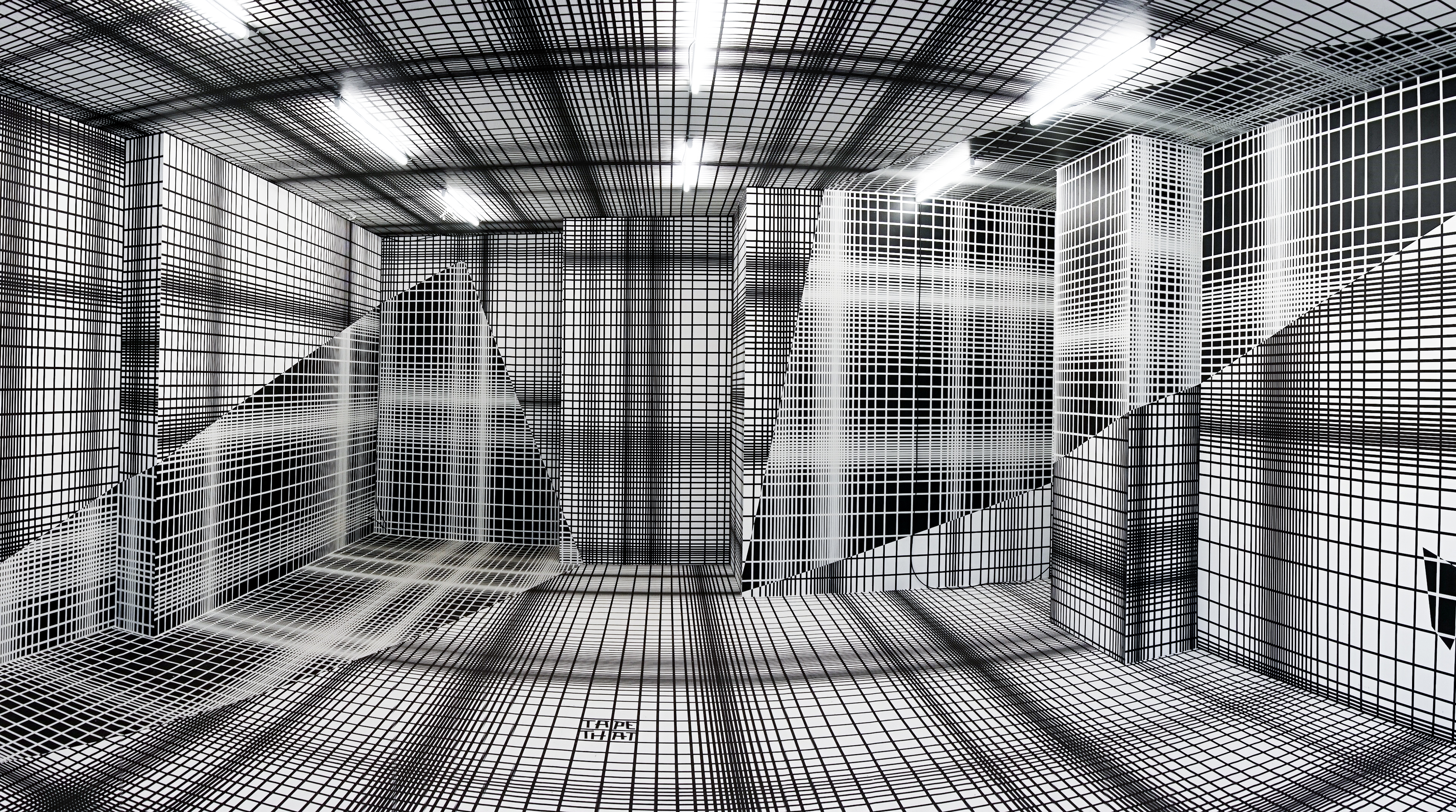
Installation by the Berlin collective Tape That.

In Berlin, the collective Tape That has produced large-scale tape murals and installations. A project description published by the Red Dot Design Award noted that Tape That designed an exhibition environment in which multiple tape installations were created on-site and explicitly incorporated the spatial conditions of the venue as part of the work.

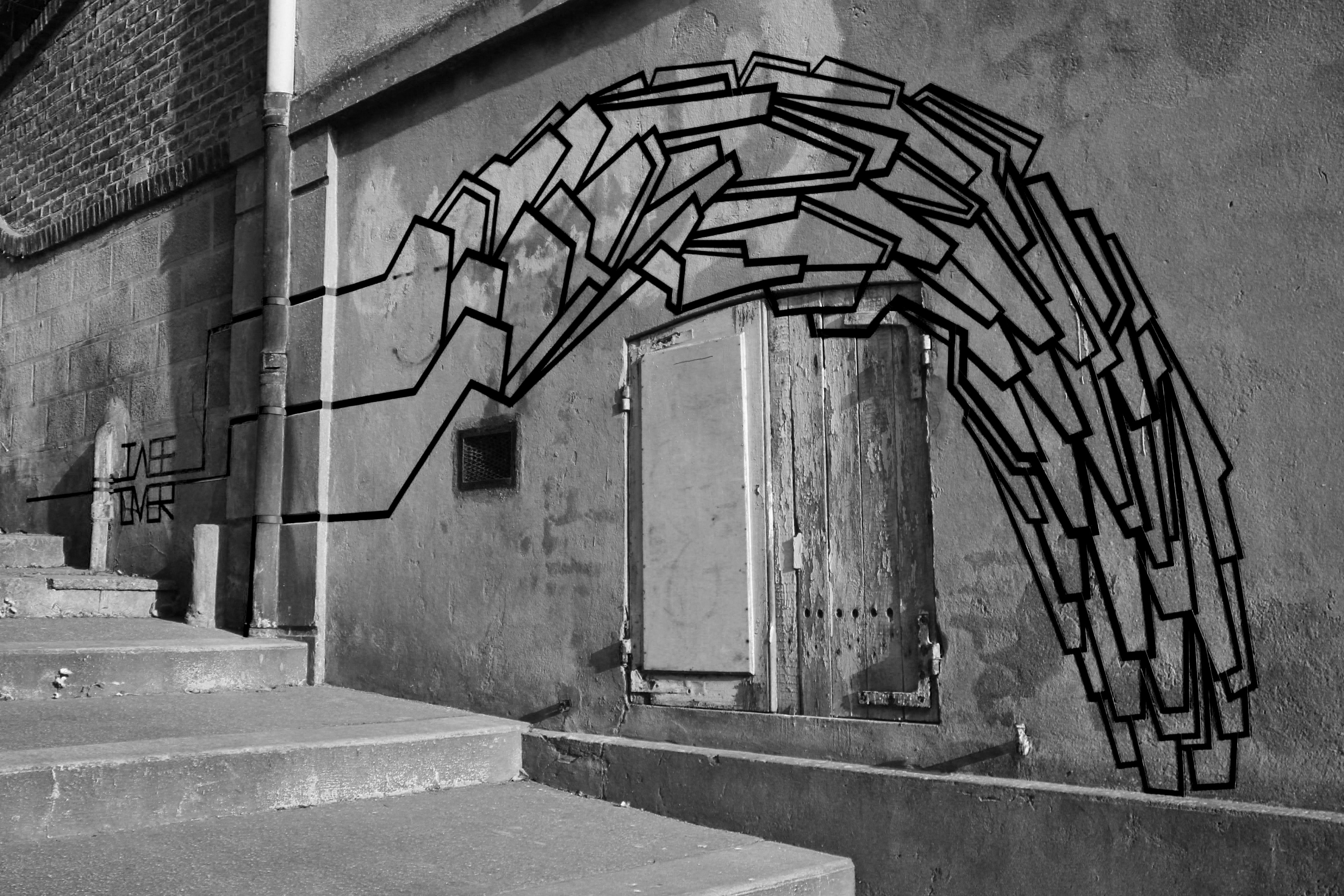
Tape installation by the Berlin group Tape Over.

Another Berlin-based group, Tape Over, has used tape as a drawing material for murals and installations and has experimented with combining tape compositions and projected animation (sometimes described as “tape mapping”).

=== Architectural and floor installations ===
In gallery and museum settings, tape may be applied directly to floors or walls as a site-specific installation material. Jim Lambie's Zobop is a widely cited example: strips of coloured vinyl tape are applied from the perimeter of a room toward the centre, producing an environment that changes with each installation. Documentation of the work has been published by institutions such as MoMA.

Berlin-based artist Monika Grzymala creates large site-specific spatial drawings—termed Raumzeichnungen (room drawings)—from kilometres of adhesive tape applied to gallery walls, floors and architectural features.

=== Tape casting and sculpture ===
Participants making a dry cast with plastic wrap and packing tape at a workshop by Mark Jenkins in Baku, 2013.

Clear packing tape can be used as a casting material. Mark Jenkins pioneered packing-tape sculpture, casting figures and objects, including his own body, in clear tape and installing the resulting transparent shells in urban settings. Jenkins has taught the process in workshops internationally, and it has been adopted in school programs.

Tape has also been used to build large inhabitable structures. The design collective Numen / For Use made Tape Paris (2014) for the group exhibition Inside at the Palais de Tokyo entirely from tape strung between pillars and walls, forming connected tubes, suspended up to 18 metres above the floor, that visitors could climb inside. They later built a version titled Tape for the exhibition Drawing in Space at the Des Moines Art Center (2018), a suspended structure in the museum's I.M. Pei gallery that visitors could crawl through, following earlier iterations in Paris, Frankfurt and Vienna.

In Japan, Ryo Sehata has made organic sculptural forms from household adhesive tape; his 2008–09 solo exhibition was sponsored by the tape manufacturer Nichiban.

=== Backlit packing-tape images ===
Backlit images can be produced by layering translucent packing tape on transparent supports such as acrylic or Plexiglas and presenting the panel with light behind it. Mark Khaisman's works are described in museum records as packaging tape on Plexiglas with an integrated light box; the Delaware Art Museum holds an example (2006; acquired 2007). Max Zorn, who began in 2011 by installing small brown packing-tape portraits on street lamps in Amsterdam, uses layered tape and a blade to build tonal depth for illuminated display; the Museum of Urban and Contemporary Art (MUCA) in Munich presented a solo exhibition of his tape works, City Lights – Tape Art Max Zorn (2022–2023).

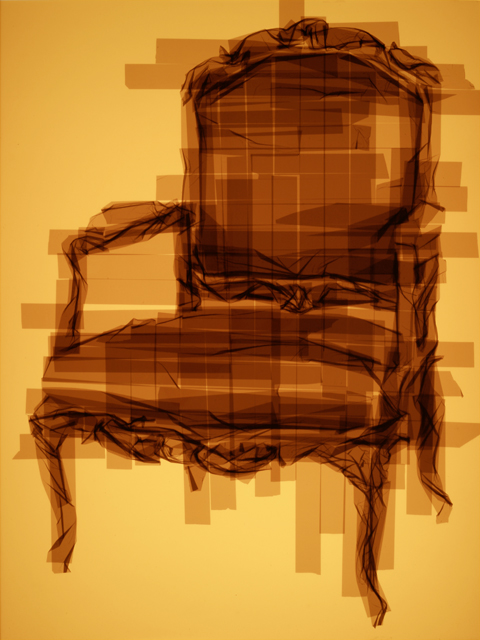
Backlit packing-tape artwork by Mark Khaisman.

=== Street interventions and tape graffiti ===
Tape has been used in street-art contexts as a non-destructive alternative to paint, allowing artists to create graphic interventions that may be removed by weather, by the public, or by the artist. Fast Company profiled the Australian artist Buff Diss for tape-based street works and described the form as “nondestructive graffiti” with an inherently precarious lifespan in public space.

In New York, Aakash Nihalani has used bright neon tape to create isometric, geometric forms on walls, sidewalks and other outdoor surfaces that read as three-dimensional optical illusions. He has described the aim as offering people "a chance to step into a different New York than they are used to seeing, and in turn, momentarily escape from routine schedules and lives."

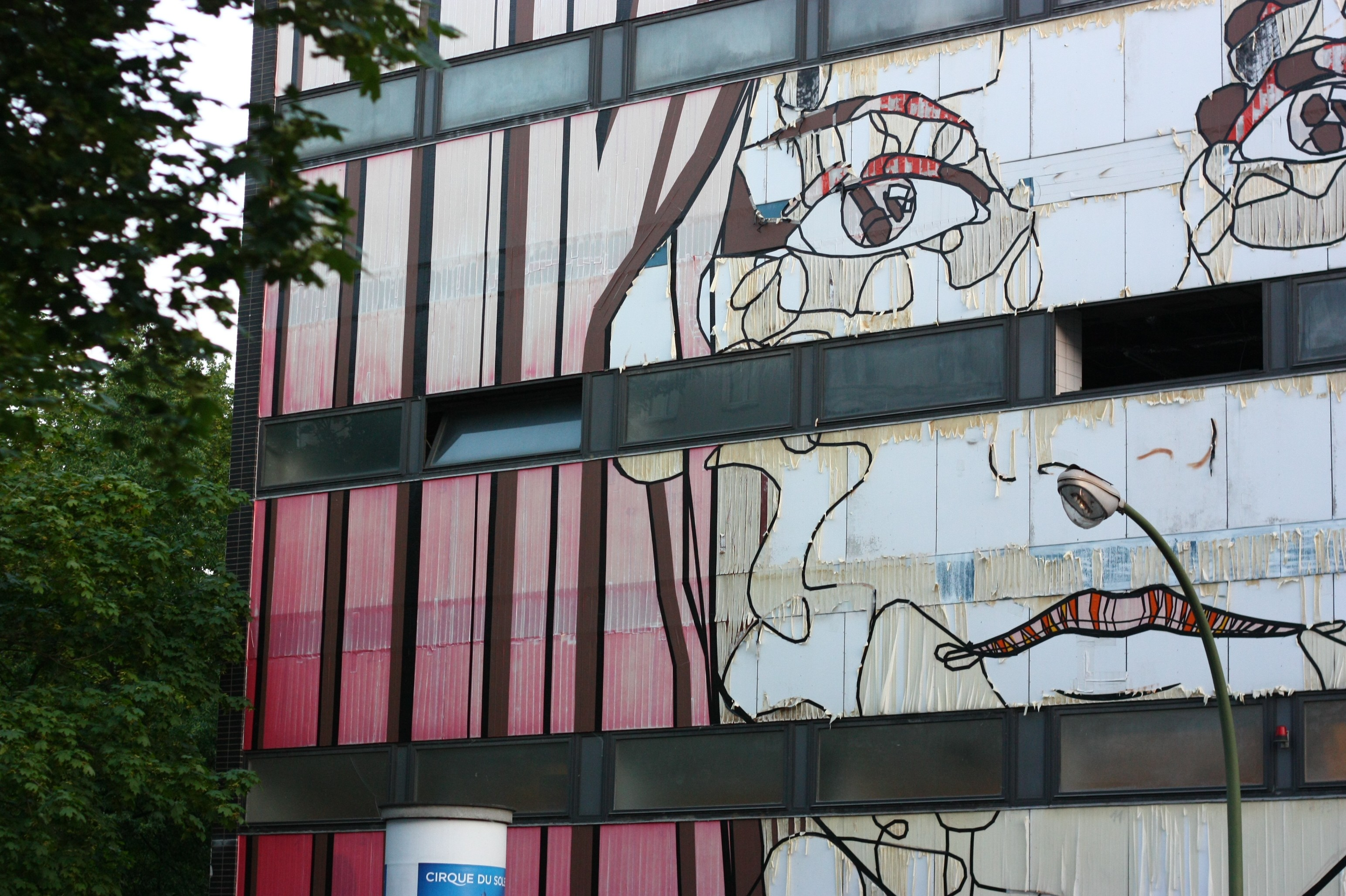
Tape art at Stadtbad Wedding, Berlin (2011).

In Berlin, the street artist El Bocho produced a large outdoor tape-art work on the facade of Stadtbad Wedding in 2009, described by Berliner Zeitung as a tape-art outdoor image made from coloured adhesive tape and presented in connection with the exhibition Urban Affairs Extended.

== See also ==
- Adhesive tape
- Street art
- Public art
- Installation art
- Light art
