= Ingrid Beazley =

Ingrid Beazley FRSA
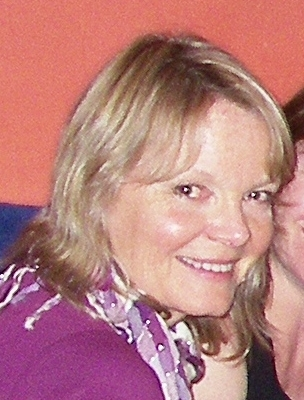
- Beazley in 2008
- Born: Ingrid Marrable; 17 January 1950; Guildford, Surrey, England
- Died: 21 April 2017, aged 67; London, England
- Education: University of St Andrews; University of London
- Occupations: Art museum curator, author, editor, educationist
- Known for: Dulwich OnView; Dulwich Outdoor Gallery
- Spouse: Tom Beazley

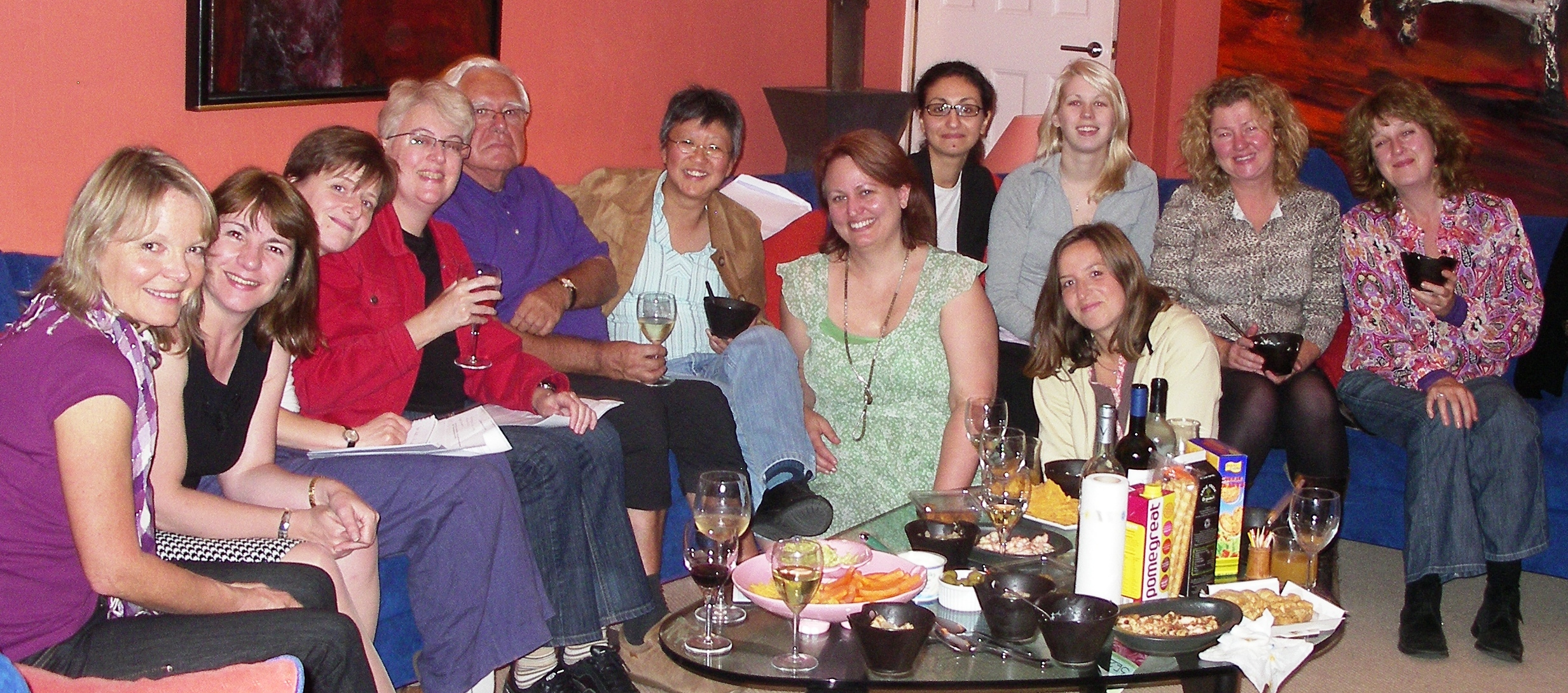
A gathering of contributors to the community blog, Dulwich OnView, in 2008, with Beazley on the left

Ingrid Beazley FRSA (17 January 1950 – 21 April 2017) was an art museum curator, author, editor, and educationist, based in Dulwich, south London, England. She was a pioneer in promoting street art.

== Life and work ==
Beazley was the daughter of a doctor, Ian Marrable, and his wife Kari. She grew up in Dodoma, Tanganyika (now Tanzania), East Africa. The family moved to England when she was 12 and she was educated at Guildford County School. She studied for a BA in Art History and Psychology at the University of St Andrews, then at the University of London, and later for a Cert Ed at a teacher training college in Gloucestershire.

Beazley worked at a number of schools in Singapore and the United Kingdom. Later, she was based in the education department at Dulwich Picture Gallery, where she promoted the use of technology. She established an associated community-run blog-based online magazine, Dulwich OnView, and contributed and edited articles. Beazley was also Chairman of the Friends of Dulwich Picture Gallery from 2005 to 2008 and in total won nine national and international awards for her work at the gallery.

In 2012, the street artist Stik collaborated with Beazley through Dulwich Picture Gallery to recreate Old Master pictures displayed in the gallery using his own street art style on the streets of Dulwich. In 2013, Beazley then established Dulwich Outdoor Gallery, a distributed set of street art in Dulwich by international street artists (including Conor Harrington, MadC, Mear One, Thierry Noir, Nunca, Phlegm, Reka One, Remi Rough and System, and ROA), with works based on traditional Baroque paintings in Dulwich Picture Gallery. One on her own house by Stik was based on the 1772 painting Elizabeth and Mary Linley by Thomas Gainsborough.

Beazley authored a related book on street art, Street Art, Fine Art. She also worked with Google's Street Art project.

In 2020, Martin Aveling established the Ingrid Beazley Award in her memory. The award comprises a £5,000 grant designed to support wildlife conservation, stimulate creativity, and support people suffering with eco-anxiety. It is awarded to the winner of the 'Human Impact' category (open to artists aged 16–22 years) at the David Shepherd Wildlife Foundation's 'Wildlife Artist of the Year' competition.

== Publications ==
- Street Art, Fine Art. London: Heni, 2015. ISBN 978-0-9568738-5-9.
