= Stik =

British graffiti artist

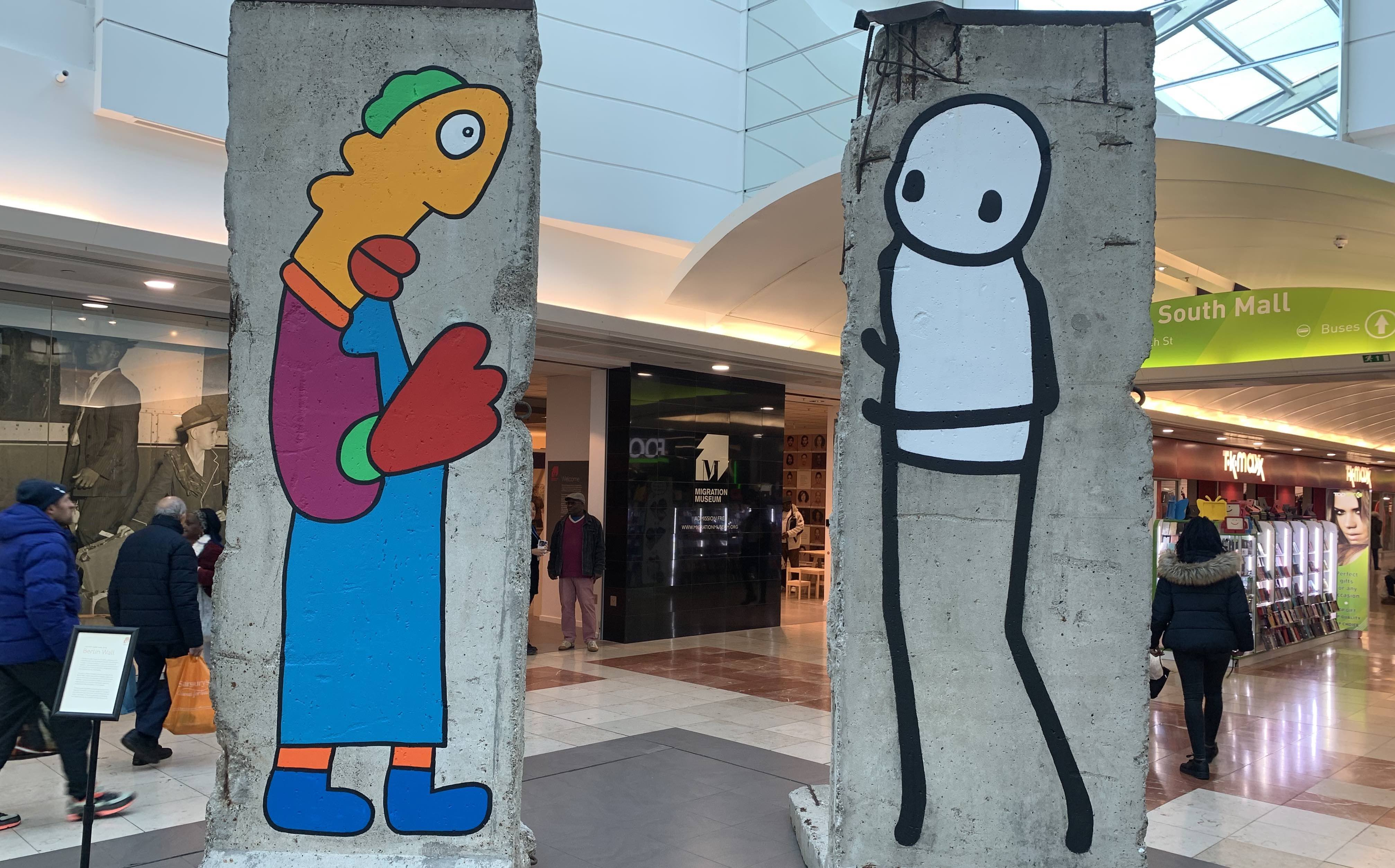
- Stik's stickman character (right) on a section of the Berlin Wall outside the Migration Museum
- Born: United Kingdom
- Known for: Graffiti art; Street art
- Website: www.stik.org

Stik, stylised as STIK, is a British graffiti artist based in London. Born in 1979 and having no formal art school training, Stik is known for painting large stick figures that are six-lines, and two-dot figures.

== Overview ==
Stik paints stick figure-like people as signature characters in street art. He began in London, working in its northeast area of Hackney, especially in Shoreditch, "and now paints murals all over the world in Europe, Asia and America."

His work is almost childlike in its simplicity and draws from the time he spent in Japan studying Japanese calligraphy characters known as kanji. In the neutrality of the figures he draws, they strike a chord with symbolism and emotion.

He liaises at the Central Saint Martins Graffiti Dialogues and has been funded to run graffiti workshops. He has worked with Amnesty International, British Waterways, the Mutoid Waste Company, Queeruption, and Reclaim the Streets. He paints unauthorised art as well as pieces that are authorised.

In 2011, Stik had a solo show at Imitate Modern, a gallery in London's West End. In 2012, he worked in Dulwich, southeast London in collaboration with curator Ingrid Beazley, where he recreated Old Master paintings in his own style that were exhibited in Dulwich Picture Gallery. This led to further street artists including Conor Harrington, MadC, Mear One, Thierry Noir, Francisco Rodrigues da Silva (Nunca), Phlegm, James Reka (Reka One), Remi Rough and System, and ROA, becoming involved to form the Dulwich Outdoor Gallery of street art around the Dulwich area in 2013. In February 2013 he collaborated with Noir in Shoreditch.

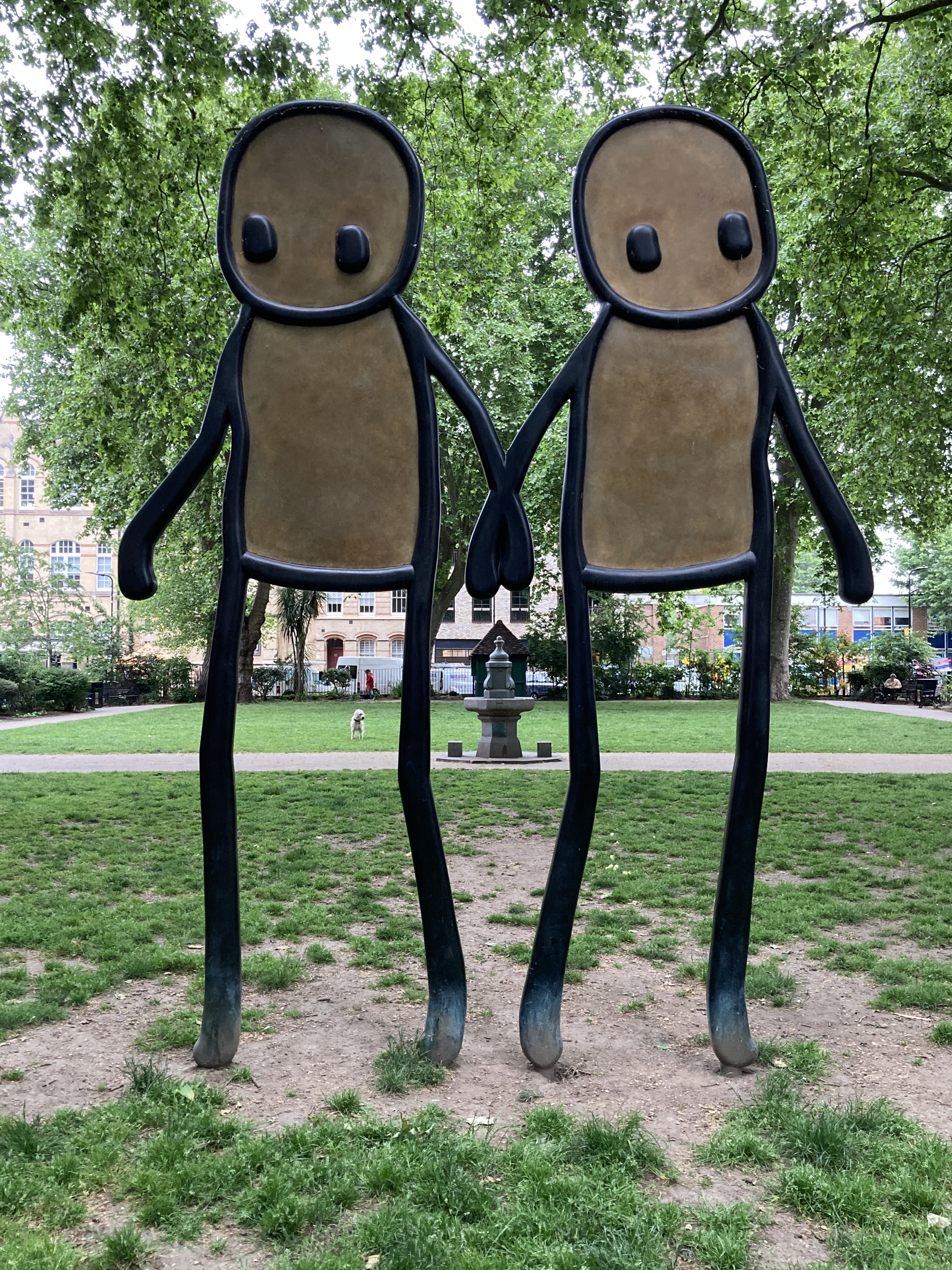
Stik's "Holding Hands" sculpture in Hoxton square

In April 2012, the London Evening Standard reported that "he was living in a St Mungo’s hostel for the homeless last year as he prepared for his first gallery show."

In March 2013 Stik gave away poster copies of his art via The Big Issue. The BBC said at the time that in "the last two years, Stik's fame has grown with celebrity endorsements and rising auction prices. One of his works, a sculpture titled ‘Up On The Roof’, fetched £150,000 at auction.

In 2020 Stik's sculpture "Holding Hands" was installed in Hoxton Square in London.

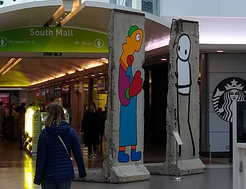
Wall outside the Migration Museum in Lewisham Shopping Centre

The sculpture Wall, at the entrance to the Migration Museum in Lewisham Shopping Centre, is made up of two panels from the former Berlin Wall, one painted by Stik and one by Thierry Noir.

In June 2022 at Bonhams Post-War and Contemporary Art sale, Stik's work Children of the Fire achieved a sale of £247,000.

== Publications ==
- Stik. Century, 2015. ISBN 978-1780893334.

== See also ==
- List of street artists
