= Neil Lawson Baker =

English painter

- Neil Lawson Baker – taken in 2007
- Born: 8 November 1938; Watford, Hertfordshire, England, UK
- Died: 1 October 2022 (aged 83); Chichester, West Sussex, England
- Education: Merchant Taylors' School, Northwood; Guy's Hospital; St George's Hospital. Artistic Training - self-taught.
- Known for: Painting, sculpture, photography
- Movement: Contemporary
- Spouse: Susan Carol Vetter: 1972 - 1980; Auriol Susanna Pace: 1992 - 2001; Grace Watson: 2002 - 2022

Neil Lawson Baker (1938–2022) was a British artist, sculptor and photographer.

== Early life ==
Neil Lawson Baker was born in Watford and had two brothers, John Stewart and Colin James. He attended Merchant Taylors' School in Northwood, Middlesex.

== Career ==
Lawson Baker went to Guy's Hospital in London where he qualified as a dental surgeon and went on to study medicine, qualifying in 1969 at St George's Hospital at Hyde Park Corner in London's West End (the building is now the Lanesborough Hotel). Lawson Baker then went on to practise at the 31 Wilton Place Practice where he became senior partner, continuing as a leading Dental Surgeon for a further 40 years, specialising in high quality restorative dentistry. He also founded The Oral Hygiene Centre at No 1 Devonshire Place in London's Harley Street area in 1978, believed to be the first truly preventive dental practice of its type, helping to pioneer preventive dentistry.

== Career change ==
He retired from dentistry at the age of 70 - calling it "a career change" – into the art world. He painted and drew, but is best known for his sculpture.

== Artistic career ==
While practising dentistry, he developed his passion for art, travelling, visiting galleries and acquiring contemporary art for his home in London. He formed a great interest, initially in the sculpture of Rodin and his school of followers, later moving to more contemporary schools.

He visited the Galerie Maeght in Rue du Bac in Paris and later the Fondation Maeght in Saint-Paul de Vence to see works by Picasso, Miró, Léger, Calder, Arp and they had a big influence on him.

In 1987, Baker began to model sculptures as recuperative therapy. His surgeon's eye–hand skills were helped by a lesson from Kees Verkade, who showed Baker how to model in wax. Baker met Eric Gibbard at the Burleighfield Foundry who had worked for the Tate Gallery, Elisabeth Frink, Philip Jackson, and Oscar Nemon as well as casting every Barbara Hepworth bronze after 1952 (initially at Morris Singer and later at Burghleighfield).

Eric became Baker's friend and mentor and took him to Paris to meet Charles Pinellis at the famous Susse-Fondeur foundry in Arcueil. Baker soon produced many bronze sculptures in the UK and France and was selling to private collectors, corporate clients and governments.

His works can be found in public places both in the UK and abroad. Lawson Baker sculptures may be seen in the entrance to the offices of the Houses of Parliament at Westminster; at British Gas Headquarters in Reading and Loughborough; in The London International Financial Futures and Options Exchange; near Albert Bridge at Sterling House on the River Thames and at the National Stadium in Kuala Lumpur.

Baker also created the sculpture unveiled by Queen Elizabeth II with President Mitterrand at the opening of the Channel Tunnel in May 1994.

Late in 2003 Baker began to use colour and work on two dimensional pieces for the first time. His contemporary works of art are mostly abstract and vibrant and he is prolific in his output. Baker uses Conté, watercolour and acrylic interchangeably.

Since 2007, Baker started exploring the world of high resolution photography as a fine art form producing a distinct style of work notably of Venice, Buenos Aires and London.

In 2006, Baker was appointed to the board of the Arts Club in London and in 2007, he was appointed chairman of the Trustees of the Chichester Art Trust, which managed and staged the National Open Art Competition and its exhibitions both in Chichester and London.

Baker worked as a professional sculptor from 2017. In early 2018 he stepped down as chairman of the Chichester Art Trust and National Open Art.

== Exhibitions ==
- "Renaissance Man" The Oxmarket Gallery, Chichester, West Sussex. 2010. A 20-year retrospective.
- "The Role of Photography in Contemporary Interior Design" presentation by Jane Arte Watt (BIDA, JAG Contemporary Design) at Franco's, Jermyn Street, London.
- "The Russian Reception" photographic display in Canning House, Belgrave Square, London. March 2008.
- "New Dimension: Fashion and Landmarks" – one month photography exhibition at The Burlington Club, London. February 2008.
- "DepARTure" – The Arts Club, London: paintings, sculptures and photography. November 2007.

== Other roles ==
Baker chaired The National Open Art Competition (NOA) from 2006 - 2018 run by the Chichester Art Trust.

In 2013, he worked with the co-operation of Street Art London to organise the Chichester Street Art Festival which he also funded. He brought 27 well-known national and international street artists to Chichester to paint walls of businesses who chose to participate. Among those who painted were: Stik; Nunca - from Sao Paulo, who had previously painted the side of Tate Modern; Thierry Noir of Berlin Wall fame; Hitnes, from Italy; Christiaan Nagel from South Africa; The Rolling People; Run; Liqen from Spain; Dscreet and ROA.

In 2018, he started the not-for-profit educational Bowdleflodes Project, whose mission is to help educate children across the world about the plight of endangered species using ART as the facilitating medium. The project houses an online 'fantasy' zoo with children's creative drawings, with each submission being linked to supporting endangered species, either in zoos or in wildlife support programmes.

== Personal life ==
Neil Lawson Baker was married to Grace Lawson Baker, a psychotherapist and speech-and-language therapist. His studios are at their home near Chichester in West Sussex.

His hobbies over the years have included competing in vintage and classic car events and rallies, riding in one and three day equestrian events, pursuing his personal artistic interests, particularly as a sculptor, and travelling. In his last years he spent considerable time visiting schools, promoting the Bowdleflodes Project, reading his stories and helping children produce creative fantasy endangered species drawings and descriptions for the Bowdleflode online Wildlife Safari Park.
