= Dulwich OnView =

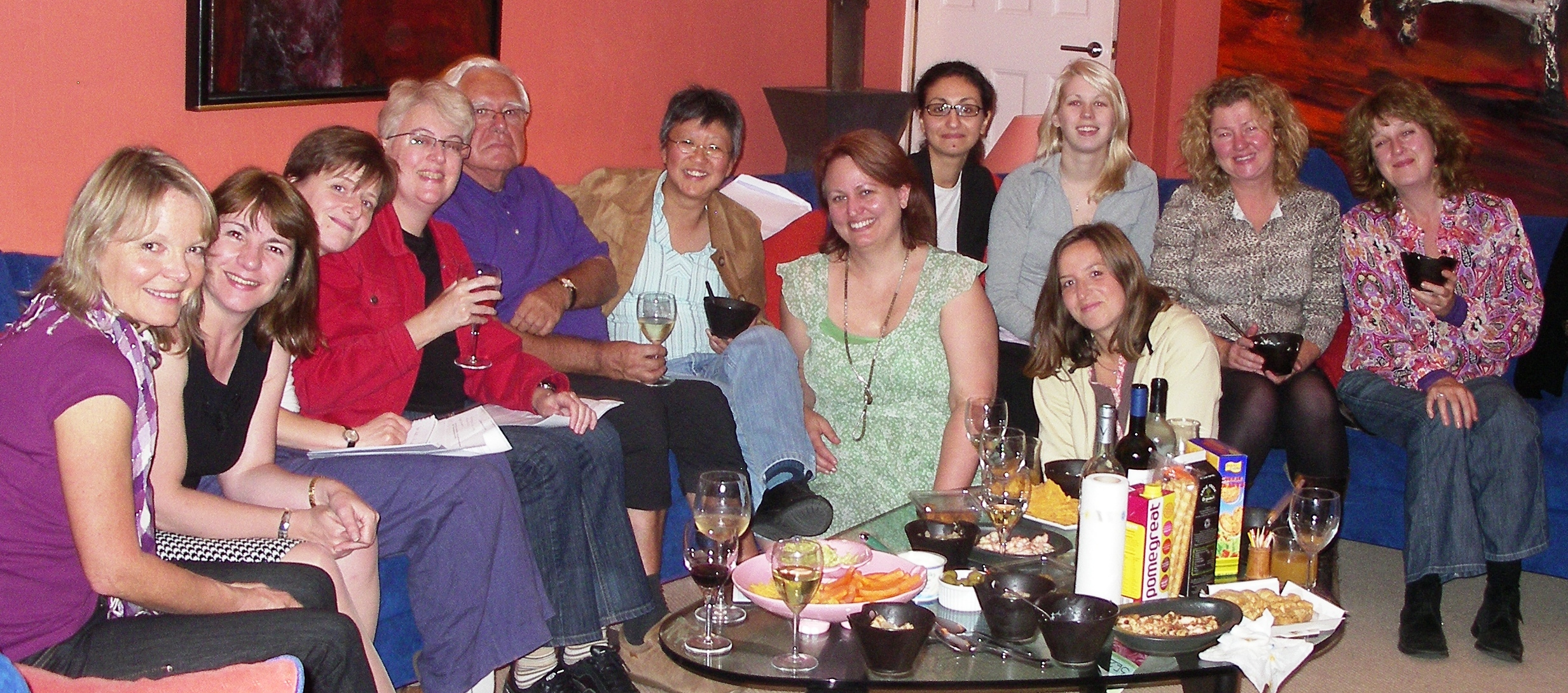
A gathering of writers and photographers who have contributed to the community blog, Dulwich OnView (2008).

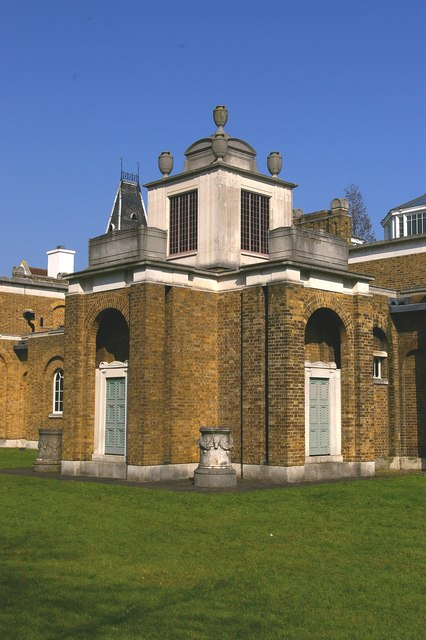
Dulwich Picture Gallery, with which Dulwich OnView is associated.

Dulwich OnView is a museum-based virtual community associated with the Dulwich Picture Gallery for the local community, based in the suburb of Dulwich, southeast London. It runs a blog-based online magazine concerned with people and culture in Dulwich and the surrounding area.

The group was formed through the Friends of Dulwich Picture Gallery in a grassroots manner. and is supported by the Gallery. It uses a Facebook group for the film society of the Friends of the Dulwich Picture Gallery, Flickr for photographs taken by the local community, a magazine blog on WordPress, and Twitter to support its activities. The group is entirely run by volunteers.

In 2010, the website was updated with multiple sections and a new style. Shortly afterwards, the site won the Museums and the Web 2010 Best of the Web awards in the "best small site" category.

In 2012, Dulwich OnView included articles on the graffiti artist Stik after he produced works in Dulwich, also featured by Dulwich Picture Gallery. In 2013, Dulwich OnView reported on the Dulwich Street Art Festival showcasing street art based on traditional artworks in Dulwich Picture Gallery, forming Dulwich Outdoor Gallery.
