= Dulwich Outdoor Gallery =

Street art collection in London, England

Coordinates: 51.454°N 0.077°W

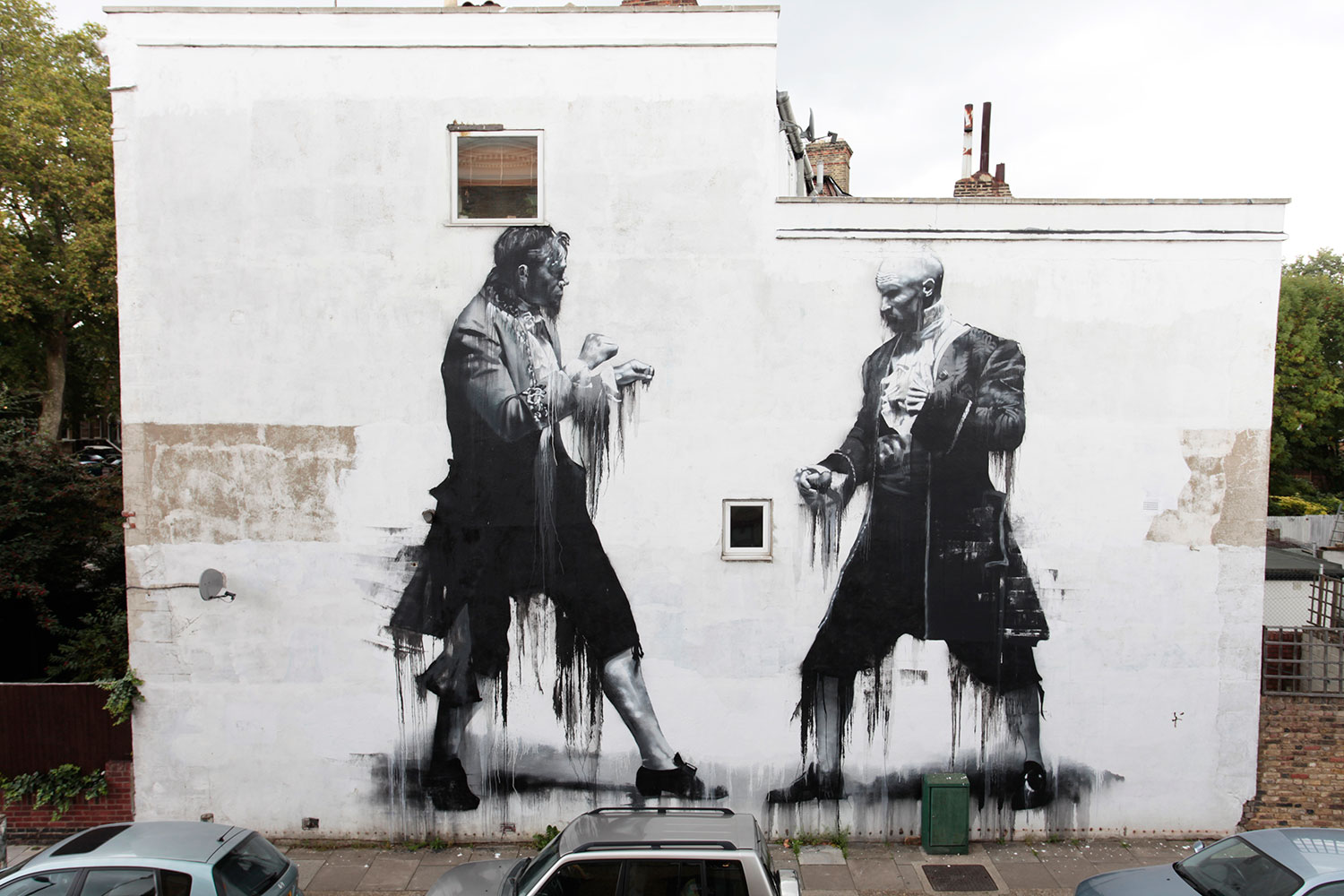
Fight Club by Conor Harrington, inspired by Massacre of the Innocents by Charles Le Brun in Dulwich Picture Gallery.

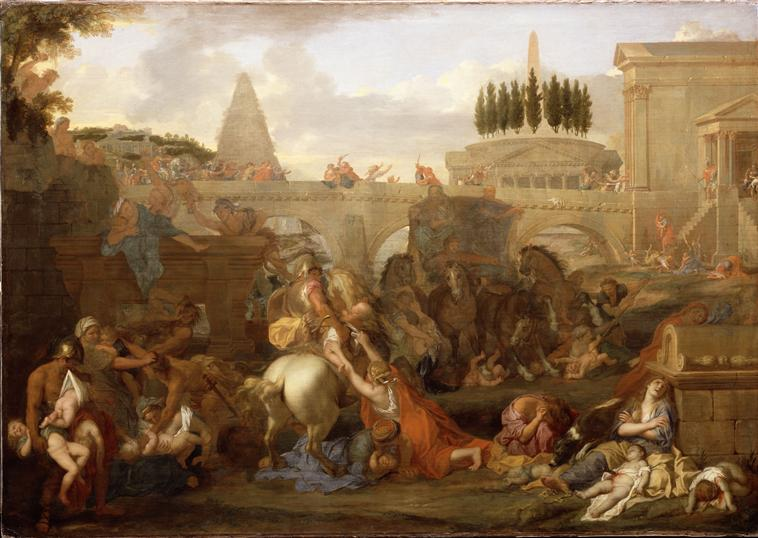
Massacre of the Innocents by Charles Le Brun in Dulwich Picture Gallery (see above).

Dulwich Outdoor Gallery (DOG) is a collection of street art in south London, with works based on traditional paintings in Dulwich Picture Gallery. The DOG was established by Ingrid Beazley, a pioneer of promoting street art.

== Dulwich Street Art Festival ==
The Dulwich Street Art Festival was held in 2013 showcasing the artworks. It was a collaboration between the Dulwich Picture Gallery education department and Street Art London. Dulwich Outdoor Gallery consists of a collection of murals painted by international contemporary street artists, based on Baroque paintings in the Dulwich Picture Gallery collection. The artworks are in a number of locations around Dulwich.

In 2012, the street artist Stik collaborated with Ingrid Beazley of Dulwich Picture Gallery to recreate old master pictures on the streets of Dulwich. In 2013, the street artists Conor Harrington, MadC, Mear One, Thierry Noir, Nunca, Phlegm, Reka One, Remi Rough and System, and ROA also became involved to form the Dulwich Outdoor Gallery. Subsequently, some of the street artists were commissioned to produce artworks as book covers.

== Gallery ==
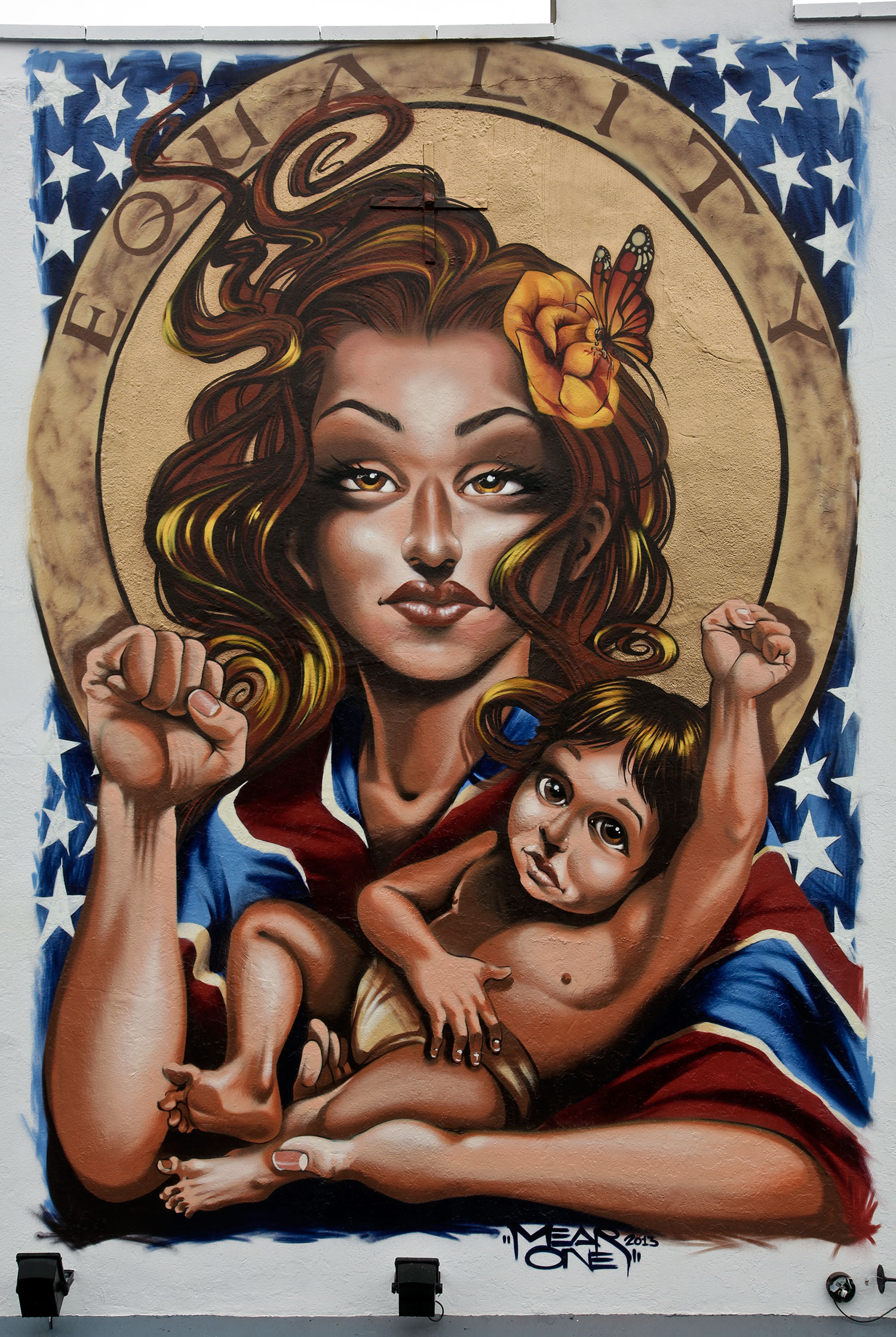
Mear One's interpretation of The Madonna of the Rosary by Bartolomé Murillo.
