= Giacomo Bufarini =

Street artist known as RUN

RUN
- Born: Giacomo Bufarini; Italy
- Website: www.runabc.org

Giacomo Bufarini, also known as RUN, is an Italian street artist based in London.whose works can be seen adorning streets from China to Senegal. His style centers on interlocking bodies in symbolic or pattern-like poses, rendered in bright colours.

== Overview ==
RUN is interested in street art as a language of communication, creating playful characters that speak to diverse audiences on multiple levels.

He started graffiti painting on lorries, trains and walls when he was young. His first big wall painting was in 2003. His inspiration comes from freedom, originality and quality.

RUN’s name is inspired by a Cypress Hill song.

== Exhibitions ==
In May 2013, RUN exhibited at the Dulwich Festival.

RUN's first solo exhibition was held at Howard Griffin Gallery, Shoreditch, London from November 2014 until early February 2015. “Parabola Di G” is a semi-autobiographical story told through a unique series of highly detailed pen and ink drawings that collectively make up a book. The imagery follows the journey of a semi-fictional character, G, as he falls through levels of reality into a dreamscape.

In September 2014, RUN opened his second solo show, 'Man is God', at Howard Griffin Gallery, Los Angeles.

=== Murals ===
In June 2013, RUN painted on the Village Underground wall in Shoreditch, London.

RUN's latest addition to London's neighbourhood of Clapton is a mural in Lower Clapton, painted along with Mexican artist Pablo Delgado.

In February 2014, RUN teamed up with Sheffield-based artist Phlegm and Christiaan Nagel on a mission to give final moments of vivacious life to yet another to be demolished building in London - the Blithehale Medical Centre in Bethnal Green.
