= Chichester Street Art Festival =

2013 street art event in West Sussex, England

- Date: May 2013
- Location: Chichester, West Sussex, England
- Type: Street art festival
- Organised by: Street Art London, Neil Lawson Baker

Chichester Street Art Festival took place in Chichester, West Sussex, England in May 2013. Street artists decorated a large number of locations throughout the city with street art.

The festival was jointly organised by Street Art London and Neil Lawson Baker (CEO of the National Open Art Competition), It was curated by Richard Howard-Griffin of Street Art London. It was organised in secret for a year beforehand, going 'live' on 4 May 2013.

Art locations included Metro House, Northgate roundabout, the old electric cinema, a private house in North Street, the Superdrug store and Baffins car park. Sixty-one panels were painted around Chichester Festival Theatre. The artists were: NUNCA, Liqen, RUN, Phlegm, ROA, Christiaan Nagel, Cityzen Kane, The Rolling People, Thierry Noir, Stik, Hitnes, and Dscreet.

“The art will be up as long as people don’t want it taken down, as long as there is no outcry,” Mr Lawson Baker said. However, in September 2013 councillors argued the work should be removed, claiming residents did not understand why it had been allowed in a conservation area.
