= Freedom for Humanity =

Temporary mural in London, England

- Artist: Mear One
- Year: 2012
- Medium: Mural
- Condition: Temporary
- Location: London; 51°31′13.2″N 0°4′17.9″W

Freedom for Humanity was a temporary mural by the American artist Mear One (Kalen Ockerman), painted on a wall in Hanbury Street in the London Borough of Tower Hamlets in mid-September 2012. It depicted men wearing business suits seated aside bent-over naked figures who formed a table while playing a Monopoly-like board game that rested on the naked figures' backs. Overseeing the scene is an Eye of Providence surrounded by images of industry and protest.

The mural was criticized for using antisemitic tropes and imagery including stereotypical depictions of Jews, references to finance and the monetary and Masonic associations of the Eye of Providence. The artist himself, Mear One, has said that "My mural is about class and privilege. The banker group is made up of Jewish and white Anglos."

== Reactions ==
A local Jewish Conservative Party councillor likened the mural to antisemitic propaganda in pre-war Germany. Lutfur Rahman, the Mayor of Tower Hamlets, sought to have the mural removed; "The images of the bankers perpetuate anti-Semitic propaganda about conspiratorial Jewish domination of financial and political institutions", he said.

Mear One responded:

"I came to paint a mural that depicted the elite banker cartel known as the Rothschilds, Rockefellers, Morgans, the ruling class elite few, the Wizards of Oz. They would be playing a board game of monopoly on the backs of the working class. The symbol of the Free Mason [sic] Pyramid rises behind this group and behind that is a polluted world of coal burning and nuclear reactors. I was creating this piece to inspire critical thought and spark conversation. A group of conservatives do not like my mural and are playing a race card with me. My mural is about class and privilege. The banker group is made up of Jewish and white Anglos. For some reason they are saying I am anti-Semitic. This I am most definitely not... What I am against is class."

Nick Wright wrote in a Morning Star article that although only two of the depicted figures were meant to be Jewish, the piece "clearly exaggerates the distinctive features of all six men" and that "exaggerated depictions of Jews are created, disseminated and understood in a historically defined context that includes a powerful, even dominant, discourse that draws upon the long traditions of antisemitism embedded in the dominant ideology and expressed, over the centuries, in the dominant visual culture". Further he states "the subterranean narratives around notions of the Illuminati, Freemasonry and bourgeois conspiracies cannot, in much popular imagination, be disentangled from deeply suspect discourses in which alien, semitic and covert elites are the controlling forces in our lives". He concludes that "This is bad art and worse politics".

In June 2024, Republican congressman Scott Perry of Pennsylvania shared a meme of the mural on his Facebook page before deleting it.

=== Jeremy Corbyn's response ===
Labour Party MP Jeremy Corbyn responded to a message from Mear One posted on Facebook containing an image of the mural stating that the mural was to be effaced the following day, objecting on grounds of freedom of expression. Corbyn replied, "Why? You are in good company. Rockerfeller [sic] destroyed Diego Viera's [sic] mural because it includes a picture of Lenin." an apparent reference to Nelson Rockefeller's destruction of Diego Rivera's Man at the Crossroads fresco in 1934.

Corbyn's response was questioned in The Jewish Chronicle in November 2015, and in March 2018, when Corbyn was the Leader of the Labour Party, Labour MP Luciana Berger demanded an explanation. Corbyn responded, "I sincerely regret that I did not look more closely at the image I was commenting on, the contents of which are deeply disturbing and anti-Semitic." The revelation and Corbyn's response fuelled allegations that he was insensitive to antisemitism in the Labour Party; that, and other examples sparked protests, public debate and a number of internal reforms within the party.

=== Graffiti critics ===
The mural received a mixed response from graffiti critics, with one expert describing it as "a rather naïve artwork [which] looked more like typical 1990s graffiti characters than anything from the Stürmer." The street art video-journalist Doug Gillen launched his career by filming the painting of the original mural in 2012. In 2018 he produced a Vlog interview during which the Vice contributor J. S. Rafaeli described the work as “absolutely, unequivocally” antisemitic, although Gillen responded by stating that when the mural was painted he "didn't pick up on any intent of malice."
