= Migration Museum, London =

Museum in London, England

Coordinates: 51.462°N 0.012°W

Migration Museum

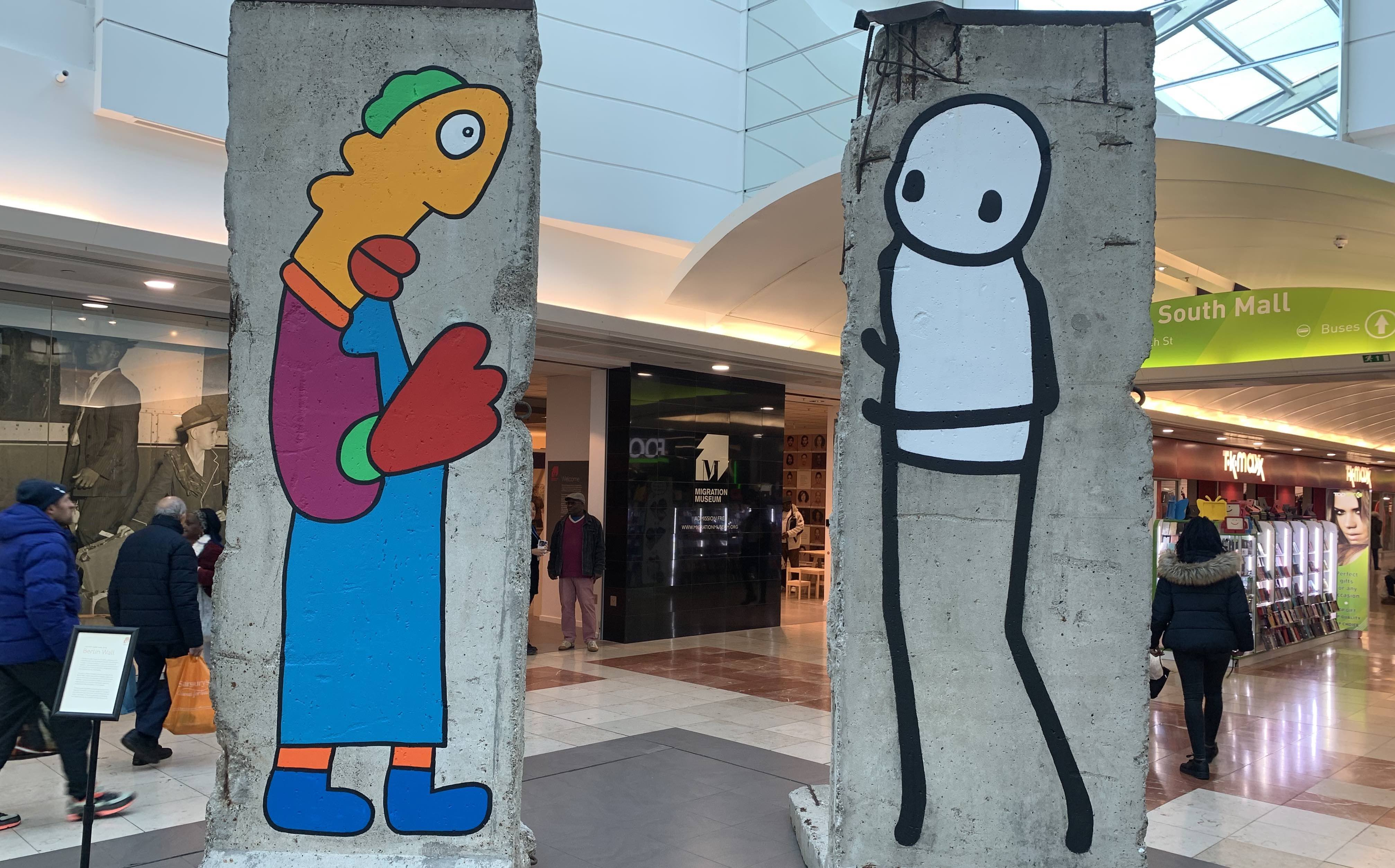
- Entrance to the museum's 2020-2025 site in Lewisham Shopping Centre. In the foreground are works by Thierry Noir and Stik painted on sections of the Berlin Wall
- Established: 2011
- Location: London (expected to reopen in new venue in 2028)
- Founder: Barbara Roche
- Chair of trustees: Charles Gurassa
- Website: migrationmuseum.org

The Migration Museum is a museum in London, England, devoted to the movement of people to and from the United Kingdom. As of 2026 it does not have a site open to the public, but it plans to reopen in a permanent venue in 2028.

== Background ==
The Migration Museum Project was founded in 2011 by Barbara Roche, a former Minister of State for Immigration. From 2013 it held a series of popup exhibitions and other activities. The museum opened in its first temporary base at the headquarters of the London Fire Brigade in Lewisham in 2017. From 2020 to 2025 it was based in Lewisham Shopping Centre in south-east London, and in February 2023 it obtained planning permission for a permanent base in the City of London.

Outside the museum's entrance in Lewisham stood a sculpture named Wall, consisting of two panels from the former Berlin Wall, painted by artists Stik and Thierry Noir.

The museum's activities include exhibitions (in 2023 and 2024 the museum staged a touring exhibition on "Migration and the Making of the NHS", in Leicester from July to October 2023, in the Trinity Leeds shopping centre in Leeds, West Yorkshire from November 2023 to February 2024, and then in London), educational activities (some 22,000 students from primary to higher education have attended its workshops from 2013 to 2023), digital resources, and networking events. The museum has signed the "Kids in Museums" manifesto. In May 2025, the museum's front of house team won the Museums + Heritage "Visitor Welcome" award.

The chair of the museum's trustees is Charles Gurassa.

The Migration Museum is a member of the International Coalition of Sites of Conscience. It has been given "Museum of Sanctuary" status by the charity City of Sanctuary.
