= Charles Gurassa =

British businessman (born 1956)

Chairman of Oxfam
- Incumbent
- Assumed office October 2020
- Preceded by: Caroline Thomson

Chairman of Channel Four Television
- In office January 2016 – January 2022
- Preceded by: Terence Burns
- Succeeded by: Ian Cheshire

Non-Executive Director, easyJet
- In office 2011 – Dec 2020
- Preceded by: board of directors
- Succeeded by: Stephen Hester

Personal details
- Born: Charles Mark Gurassa; 15 February 1956 (age 70) London, United Kingdom
- Party: Unknown
- Occupation: Businessman
- Known for: Channel 4; Merlin; easyJet; tui; Oxfam; Guardian Media Group

Charles Mark Gurassa (born 15 February 1956) is a British businessman and chair of the Guardian Media Group. He is a former chairman of the television station, Channel 4, and succeeded Lord Burns in January 2016.

Gurassa graduated from the University of York with a bachelor's degree in economics and earned an MBA from the International Management Centre in Buckingham. He began his career in 1978 as a trainee in Thomas Cook and progressed to become the general manager of retail by the time he left the company in 1989. During the following decade, he worked at British Airways, leading the sales team and as a director of passenger and cargo businesses.

Gurassa was CEO of Thomson Travel Group from December 1999 to May 2003. He served as a non-executive director of Merlin Entertainment until November 2019 when he stepped down as part of an acquisition. He was an independent non-executive director of easyJet from 2011-2020.

In July 2020, Oxfam announced that they had elected him to succeed Caroline Thomson as its chair in October 2020.

Gurassa has previously chaired the boards of Virgin Mobile and Lovefilm and was a board member of the National Trust and Whitbread. As of 2022, he is on the board of British Airways and is chairman of the Migration Museum in London and the tour operator Great Rail Journeys.

Media offices
Preceded by Caroline Thomson	Chairman of Oxfam; October 2020 – Present	Succeeded by Incumbent
Preceded by Terence Burns	Chairman of Channel 4 January 2016 – January 2022	Succeeded by Ian Cheshire
Preceded by Andy Martin	Director of easyJet; 2011 – December 2020	Succeeded by Stephen Hester
Preceded by See Merlin	Director of Merlin Entertainments; 2013 – 2019	Succeeded by Scott M. O'Neil
