= Lewisham Shopping Centre =

Lewisham Shopping
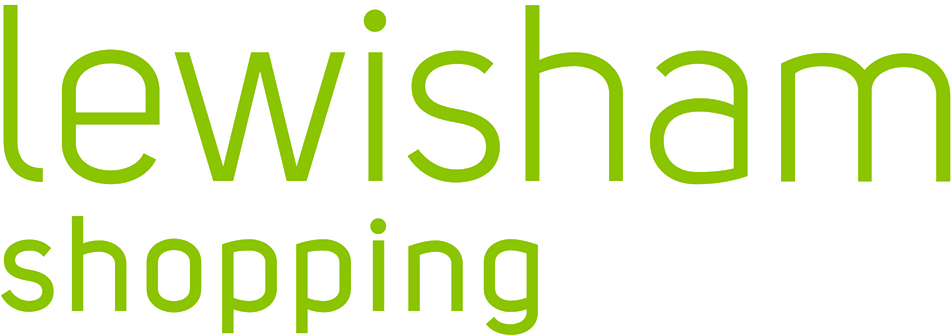

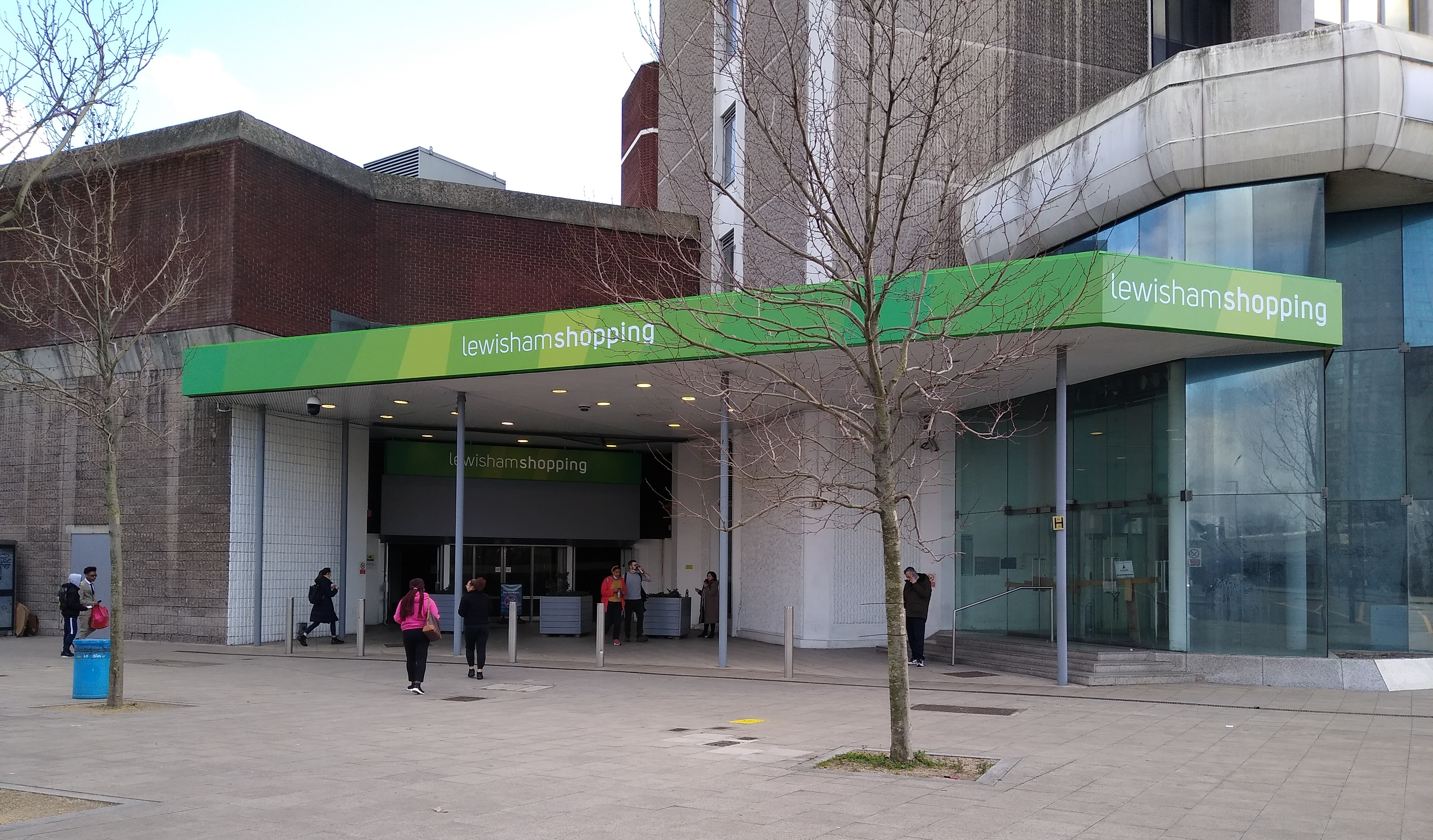
- Lewisham Shopping Centre northern entrance on Molesworth Street
- Location: Lewisham, England
- Coordinates: 51.462°N 0.012°W
- Opened: 1977; 49 years ago
- Manager: Landsec
- Num. of stores: 70
- Num. of anchor tenants: 5
- Floor area: 330,000 sq ft (31,000 m^{2})
- Floors: 1 (2–3 within some stores)
- Parking: 800 spaces
- Website: https://lewishamshopping.co.uk/

Lewisham Shopping Centre, formerly Riverdale Centre, is a shopping mall located in Lewisham, London, England. The centre is the major shopping centre in the London Borough of Lewisham. Also part of the complex is the Lewisham House office tower, formerly occupied by Citibank. There are proposals to convert this building to flats.

The centre is located in Lewisham town centre and was built over the former streets Rhyme Road and Romer Avenue. The official address is on Molesworth Street (a dual carriageway section of the A21). The car park is located on the upper levels. Facilities at the centre include public toilets with baby changing, photobooths and ATMs. The Migration Museum is based in the centre.

Since the Docklands Light Railway extension from Island Gardens reached Lewisham the centre experienced an increase in customers.

== Stores ==
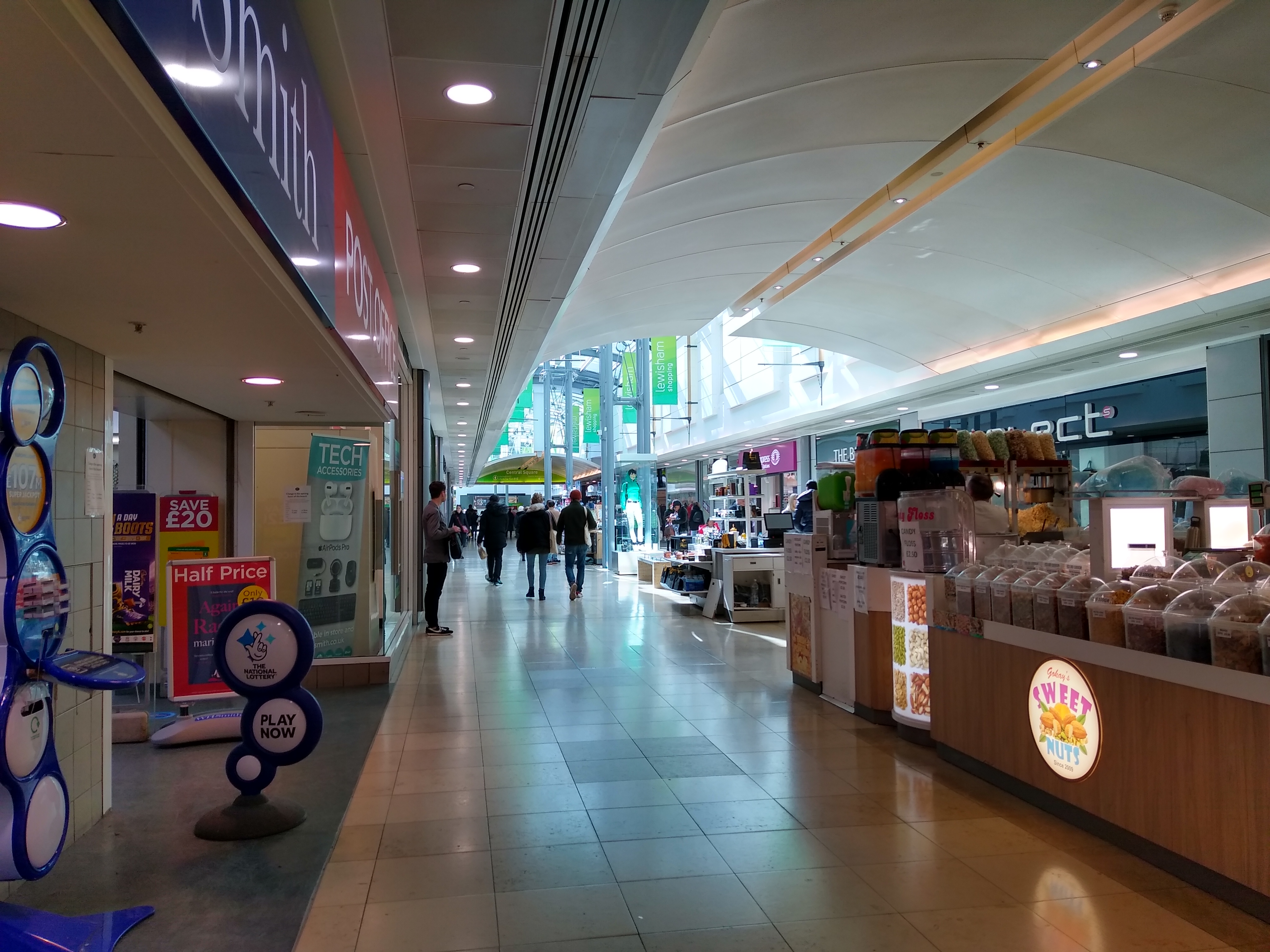
Interior

The largest stores in the centre are Sainsbury's, Marks and Spencer, H&M and Argos.

The Model Market is a street food market at the south end of the site, which opens in the summer months.

== Redevelopment ==
In September 2022, Landsec announced its intention to redevelop the Lewisham Shopping Centre site as part of a long-term regeneration programme for Lewisham town centre. The plans propose new homes, community facilities and public spaces while re-establishing a traditional high street layout across the 17-acre (7 ha) site.

In November 2023, the developer appointed Studio Egret West as lead architect. The initial concept included around 1,700 new homes, new community spaces and event squares, and a green "urban meadow" park through the centre of the site.

In November 2024, Landsec-U+I submitted a hybrid planning application to Lewisham London Borough Council seeking consent for the first phases of the scheme. The masterplan proposes approximately 1,700 new homes, including 445 co-living units and up to 660 student rooms, alongside shops, cafés and workspaces.

Key elements of the proposal include:

- Around eight acres of new public realm and green space, including an elevated “urban meadow” park.
- Three new public squares for community events and markets.
- More than 300 new trees and new walking and cycling routes across the town centre.
- A 500-capacity live-music and performance venue operated on a not-for-profit basis.
- Provision for shops, cafés, and workspaces on the ground floors of new streets and squares.
- Retention and adaptation of parts of the existing centre to maintain trading activity during phased redevelopment.
- Residential buildings ranging from 5 to 35 storeys, including several detailed plots submitted for early delivery.

The developer estimates that the project could contribute around £160 million per year to the local economy once completed. According to media reports, approximately 20 per cent of the new homes are expected to be affordable, including both social and discounted-market rent tenures.

A planning decision by Lewisham Council to approve was agreed in October 2025. Subject to Mayor of London consent, construction is expected to begin in 2026, with phased delivery continuing into the late 2030s.

== Transport ==
- Docklands Light Railway - At Lewisham station, which is just a couple of minutes away. The DLR has services to Stratford and the City.
- Southeastern - Train services to destinations including Central London, Dartford, and Kent.
- There are bus stops on both sides of the centre and Lewisham Bus station outside the train station, for services to Croydon, Bromley, Bexleyheath, and Woolwich.
