= Thierry Noir =

French painter (born 1958)

- Born: 1958 (age 67–68); Lyon, Rhône-Alpes, French Fourth Republic
- Notable work: Berlin Wall murals
- Style: Street art
- Website: thierrynoir.com

Thierry Noir (French pronunciation: [tjɛʁi nwaʁ]; born 1958) is a French artist and muralist based in Berlin. He is considered the first artist to paint the Berlin Wall in the 1980s. He created brightly-colored paintings across large spans of the Berlin Wall and some of these original paintings can still be seen on surviving segments of the Wall in art collections and on the East Side Gallery. Noir's work and style are now considered iconic, and Noir is also regarded as one of the forerunners of the street art movement as a whole. He continues to create murals worldwide in cities including London, Los Angeles, and Sydney.

== Early life ==
Thierry Noir was born in Lyon, France, in 1958. At age 23 in January 1982, he moved to West Berlin with two small suitcases after purchasing a one-way train ticket. He was inspired by musicians David Bowie, Nina Hagen, and Iggy Pop who also lived in West Berlin at the time. The lyrics to Lou Reed's "Berlin" also convinced Noir to stay. He initially lived in a squat (the Georg von Rauch House) in Mariannenplatz overlooking the Berlin Wall. Upon arriving in Berlin, Noir himself became a musician and toured as a multi-instrumentalist in the German musical group, Sprung aus den Wolken.

== Career ==
=== 1984–1991: Painting the Berlin Wall ===
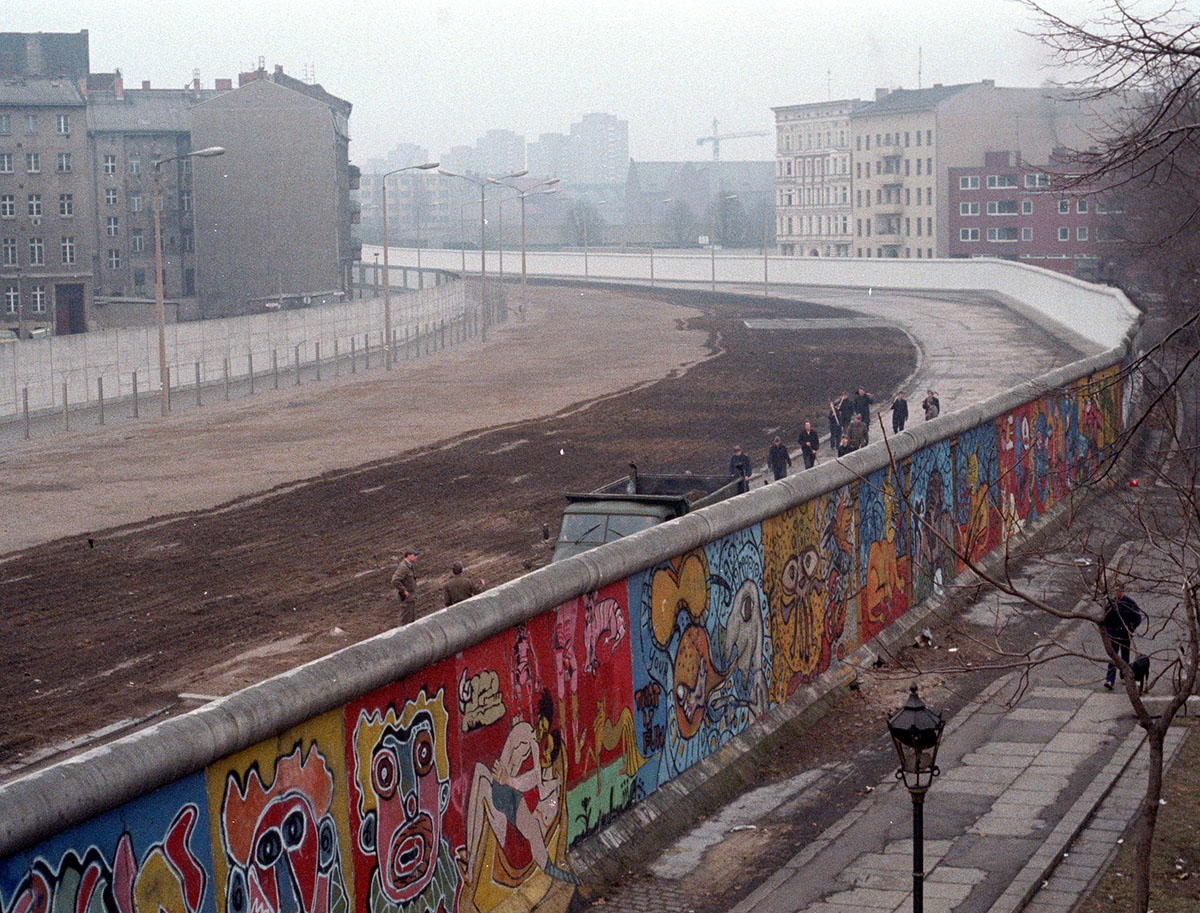
View from the West Berlin side of the Berlin Wall in 1986 showing Noir's early Berlin Wall murals.

In 1984, Noir began painting the Berlin Wall with fellow French artist, Christophe-Emmanuel Bouchet. Their first paintings were a reaction to the melancholy, sadness, and "pressure of daily life" they experienced living so close to the Wall. They used paint scavenged from nearby construction sites or left behind by city workers. Prior to this, graffiti on the Wall had largely consisted of anti-American slogans, racist notes, and funny messages. Noir himself noted that painting large images on the Wall had been seen as a "taboo, even among alternative people". Noir and Bouchet's status as foreigners allowed them to effectively skirt this taboo. One of the first works they painted on the wall was an homage to Jean de La Fontaine's fable of "The Tortoise and the Hare" close to Potsdamer Platz.

Initially, local Berliners were wary or even hostile in their attitude toward Noir's work. Some were concerned about the source of his potential financial backing, even suggesting that he might work for the American Central Intelligence Agency or that he might be a French spy. Noir also had to paint quickly and surreptitiously to avoid being caught by the Genztruppen (German Democratic Republic border guards). Owing to these constraints, Noir developed his now iconic style (which he dubbed "Fast Form Manifest") to portray his figures with one continuous line and just a few colours.

Despite early difficulties, Noir's work earned appreciation from Berlin residents and helped to create an artistic movement around the Wall that attracted numerous local artists like Kiddy Citny and a number of visiting international artists including Richard Hambleton and Keith Haring. Over the course of five years, Noir painted around six kilometres of the Berlin Wall, which was toppled in 1989.

=== 1990–present: Post-Berlin Wall work ===
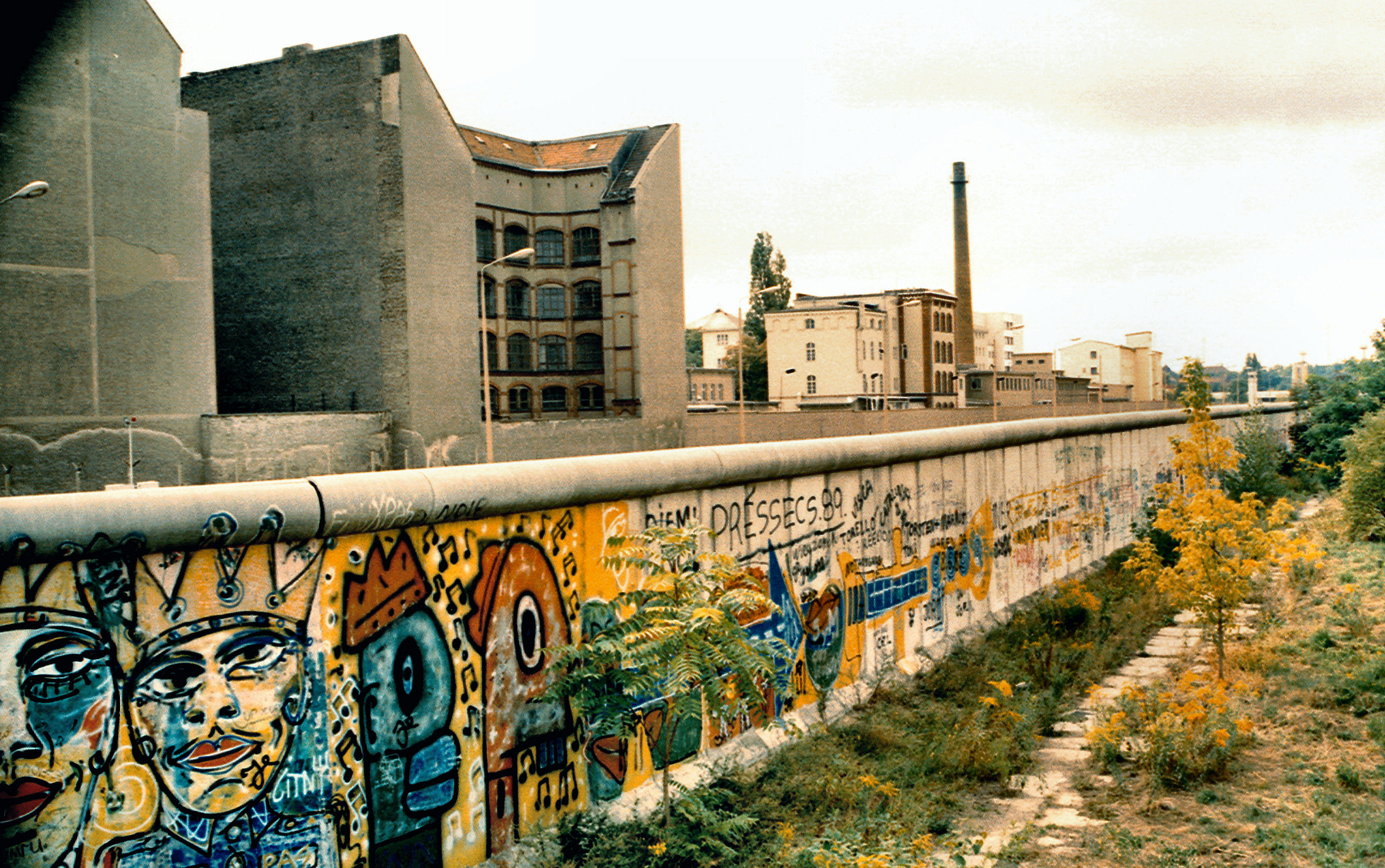
View of Noir murals on the Berlin Wall next to Boyenstrasse in 1989.

Following the fall of the Berlin Wall, Noir was one of the artists invited to create murals at the East Side Gallery, which was established in 1990. The Gallery is a 1,316-metre remnant of preserved Berlin Wall in Friedrichshain-Kreuzberg that was not torn down because it stood on the other side of the River Spree in GDR-controlled East Berlin. Since 1990, Noir's murals at the East Side Gallery have come to be regarded as a fixture of Berlin.

On 23 June 1990, 33 original painted sections of the Berlin Wall featuring Noir's artwork that had been saved from destruction were auctioned off at the Hotel Metropole in Monte Carlo to an international audience. His artwork then spread internationally to collections and museums throughout the world.

Throughout the 1990s, Noir continued to work as an artist. He also collaborated with Irish rock group U2, who commissioned him to paint a series of six Trabant cars for their 1992 Zoo TV Tour. Noir's Trabants were incorporated into the lighting rigs for the tour, and images of them were used as cover art for U2 singles including "The Fly" and "Mysterious Ways". One of Noir's Trabants was also featured on the cover of U2's album, Achtung Baby.

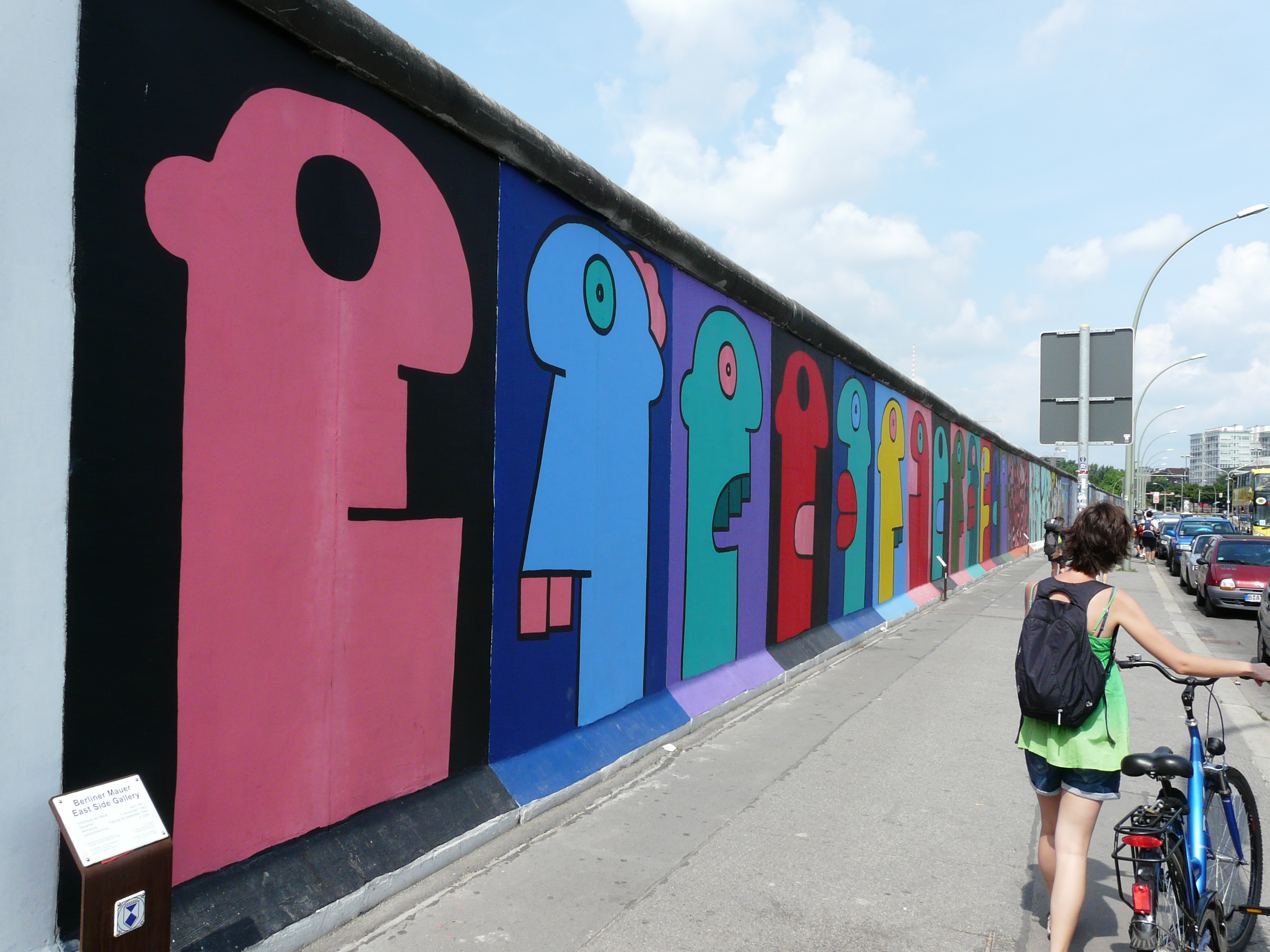
Thierry Noir mural painted on remnants of the Berlin Wall at the East Side Gallery in Berlin, 2011.

To commemorate the 20th anniversary of the fall of the Berlin Wall in 2009, Noir was invited to Los Angeles to participate in the Wende Museum's The Wall Project. Ten original segments of the Berlin Wall were imported to the United States and newly painted in Los Angeles by Noir and L.A.-based artists including Shepard Fairey, Retna, and Kent Twitchell. These works were then permanently exhibited at 5900 Wilshire Boulevard near the Los Angeles County Museum of Art.

Noir traveled to London in 2013 to collaborate with the U.K. artist, STIK, on a large mural on the Village Underground in Shoreditch and to deliver a public lecture at Somerset House on the history of street art. While in London, Noir painted numerous new murals in his signature style on the walls of Shoreditch and Dalston. Noir also worked with Dulwich Picture Gallery on a reinterpretation of Giovanni Battista Tiepolo's baroque masterpiece Joseph Receiving Pharaoh's Ring (1755), which is now a part of the Gallery's permanent collection as a mural in Dulwich Park.

Twenty-five years after the fall of the Berlin Wall in 2014, Noir staged a retrospective exhibition in London. The exhibition featured original artworks, films, photographs, and interviews. That year, Noir was commissioned by the Museum of London to create a mural on the museum's rotunda entrance and was also commissioned by the Embassy of Germany to the U.K. to paint a mural in London's Belgrave Square to commemorate the 25th anniversary. Noir also painted the interior of the former East German Embassy building at 34 Belgrave Square. Later in 2014, Noir's retrospective traveled to Los Angeles where he painted a 100-metre long mural on South Spring Street in recognition of the Sister Cities relationship between Berlin and L.A. Noir also donated a painting to the German Consulate in the United States.

Throughout 2017, Noir painted his three largest-scale public works at the time in London, Los Angeles, and Sydney. In London, Noir painted a 37-metre high tower block in Acton which was considered the tallest mural in Britain. In Los Angeles, he completed a 15,000 square-foot mural in North Hollywood. In Sydney, he painted a former jam factory in Surry Hills.

To mark the 30th anniversary of the fall of the Berlin Wall, Noir was commissioned (along with STIK) by the Imperial War Museum in London to paint new artworks on original segments of the Wall. The two segments, titled WALL, were displayed outside the Imperial War Museum in November 2019. The two segments were later displayed at the Migration Museum in South London. Also in 2019, Noir staged a charity exhibition titled The Thierry Noir Academy of Art at Protein Studios in London. All proceeds from the exhibition were donated to the Hackney-based children's charity, The Kids Network.

== Collections ==
Noir's painted Berlin Wall segments are on permanent display in private and public collections worldwide. His pieces can also be seen at the still-standing East Side Gallery in Berlin. Several of Noir's artworks are part of permanent museum collections, including at the Allied Museum in Berlin, the Newseum in Washington, D.C., the National Museum of the United States Air Force in Dayton, Ohio, the Wende Museum in Los Angeles, and the Migration Museum in London, where an adjacent segment is painted by Stik. Other segments are displayed publicly in cities throughout the world. In New York City, Noir's Wall segments can be seen at Kowsky Plaza in the Battery Park City community and at 520 Madison Avenue in Manhattan. Six segments are located on Leipziger Platz in Berlin. In Los Angeles, segments are located at 5900 Wilshire Boulevard as part of a larger display and at Loyola Marymount University. Other cities with Noir's painted Wall segments include Yokohama, Japan; Uijeongbu, South Korea; Mexico City; Reston, Virginia; and the Spanish island of Ibiza.

In 2013 during the Art Basel Fair in Miami, Florida, Noir repainted four original segments of the Berlin Wall, which are now in the public art collection of Ironside district. In 2019, Heidi Klum's husband, Tom Kaulitz, gifted her a segment of the Berlin Wall that had been newly painted by Noir for display outside her home in Los Angeles. Later in 2019, Noir presented a newly painted segment of the Wall in Plovdiv, Bulgaria to commemorate the 30th anniversary of the fall of the Berlin Wall and Plovdiv's status as a European Capital of Culture in 2019.

== Film and other work ==
Noir and his Wall paintings can briefly be seen in the 1987 Wim Wenders film, Wings of Desire. Noir met Wenders on a number of occasions at a local restaurant where he would sell some of his artwork. After talking multiple times per week, Wenders decided to put Noir in a scene where he was depicted standing on his ladder while working on the Berlin Wall. That ladder is now in the permanent collection of the Wende Museum in Los Angeles. In 2000, Noir was featured in the German documentary Nach dem Fall (After the Fall), in which he discussed his art and the importance of the Wall to Berlin only a decade after its fall.

Noir has participated in the Berlin Festival of Lights since 2014. As part of the annual festival, Noir's artworks are digitally projected onto Berlin landmarks such as Brandenburg Gate, the Berlin Cathedral, and the P5 Tower in Potsdamer Platz.

In 2015, Noir worked with drinks firm Hennessy to create custom bottle labels with sale proceeds going to the Centrepoint charity for homeless youth. In 2016, Noir partnered with the audio equipment manufacturer Rega on a series of seven hand-painted Rega RP1 turntables. The turntables were sold at auction to raise money for Amnesty International.

== Legacy ==
Noir's Berlin Wall paintings, featuring his signature brightly-coloured, cartoon-like figures, are now considered iconic and representative of the movement in opposition to the Wall because they attracted other artists to the movement. Noir is considered one of the forerunners of the street art movement as a whole. Despite their ostensibly "naive" style, the paintings "stood as the voice of freedom" in artistic protest against the often deadly border. They also became a symbol of new-found freedom after the reunification of Germany and the end of the Cold War.

== See also ==
- List of French artists
- List of street artists
