= Conor Harrington =

Irish street/graffiti artist (born 1980)

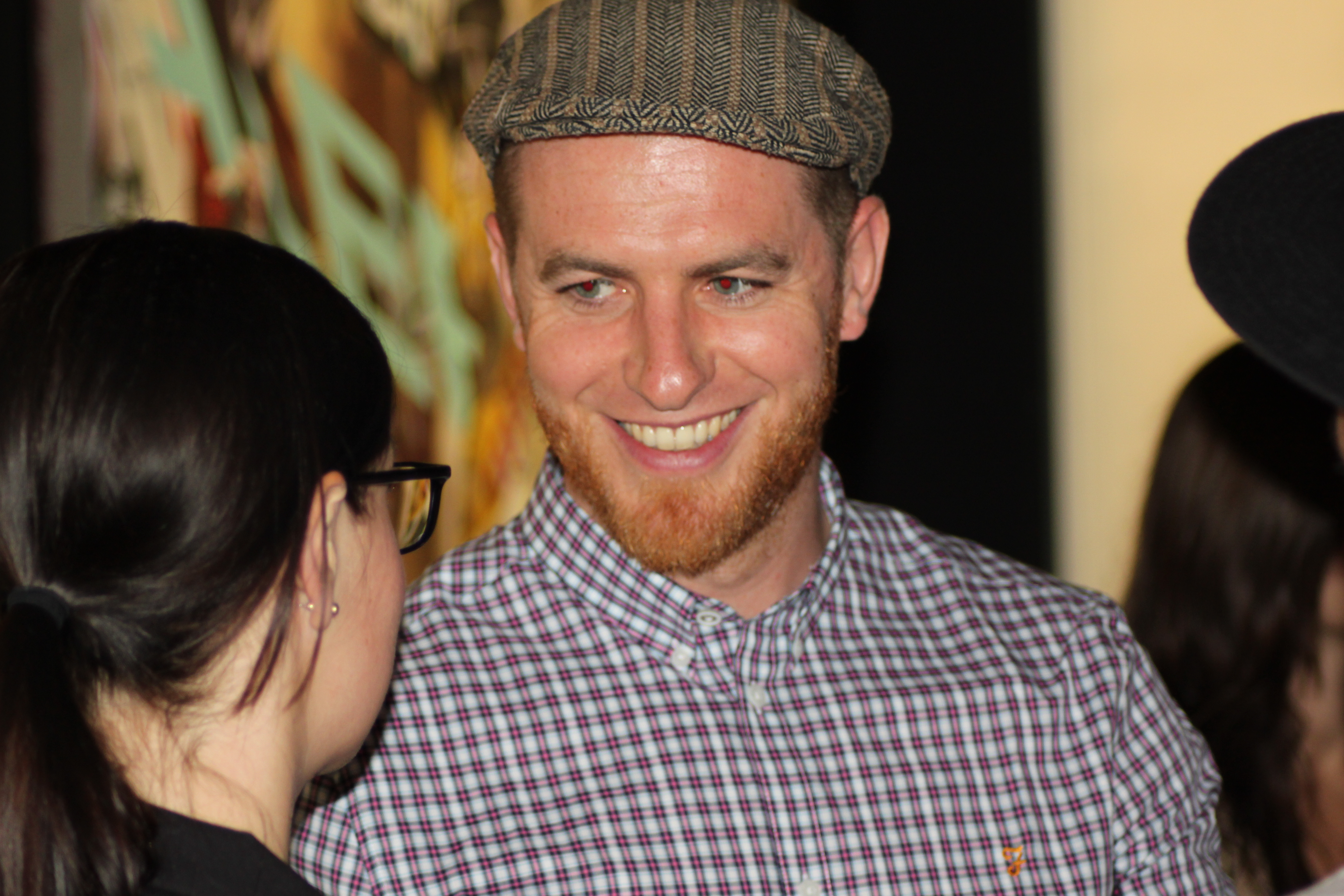
- Harrington, 2010
- Born: 1980 (age 45–46); Cork, Ireland
- Known for: Graffiti

Conor Harrington (born 1980) is an Irish street/graffiti artist based in London, England.

== Overview ==
Harrington is known for both his street work and his gallery work.

== Early life ==
Conor Harrington was born in Cork, Ireland, in 1980. He started tagging and making graffiti as a teenager.

== Career ==
Conor Harrington attended Limerick School of Art and Design and graduated in 2002 with his Bachelor of Fine Arts.

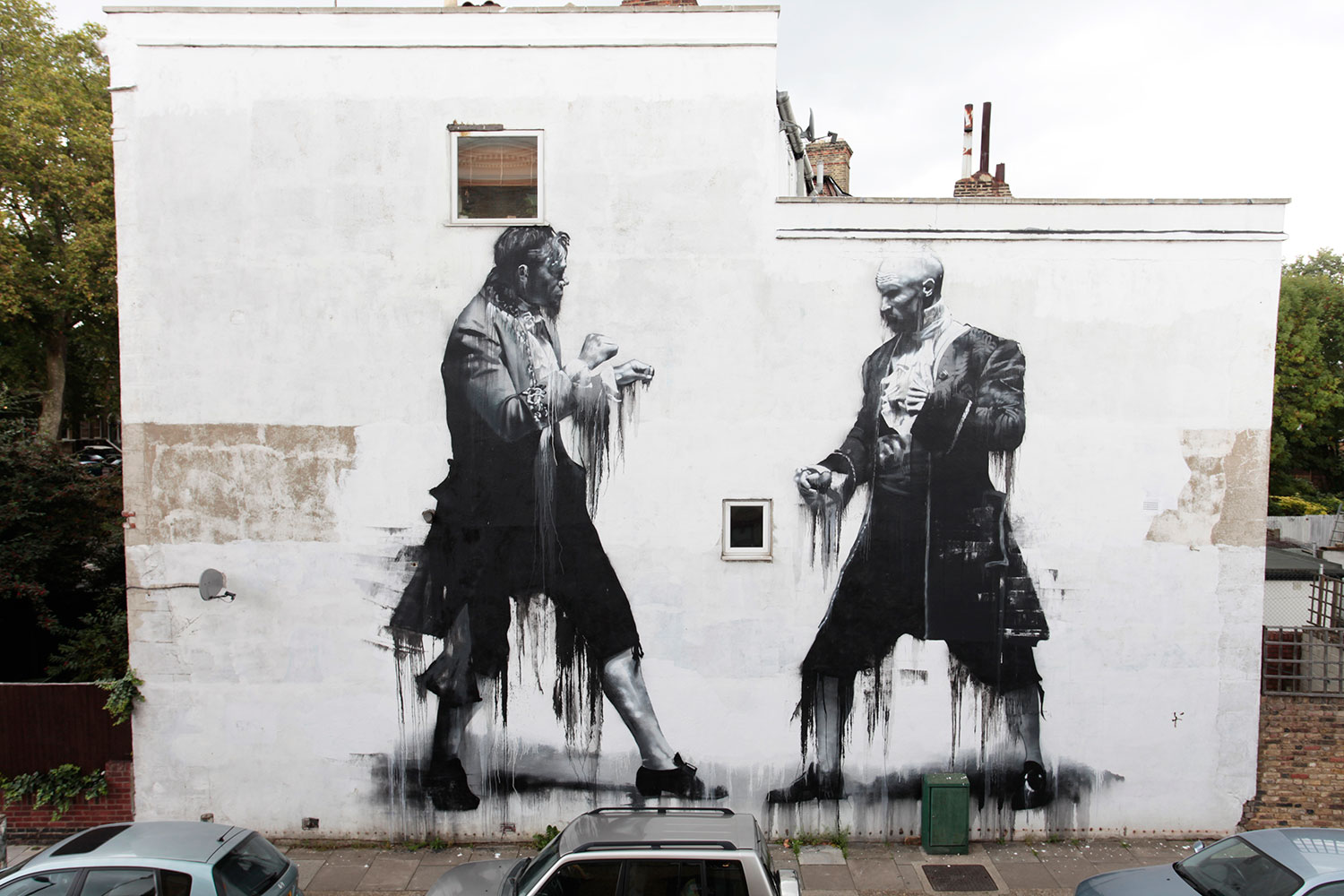
Fight Club by Conor Harrington in Dulwich, south London, inspired by Massacre of the Innocents by Charles Le Brun in Dulwich Picture Gallery, produced as part of Dulwich Outdoor Gallery in 2013.

In 2013, Harrington participated in the Dulwich Outdoor Gallery project, initiated by Ingrid Beazley of Dulwich Picture Gallery.

== Exhibitions ==
Conor Harrington's exhibitions have included the following.

Solo exhibitions

- "Eat and Delete", Lazarides pop-up, New York (2014)
- "Whole Lot of Trouble for a Little Win", The Outsiders, London (2013)
- "Dead Meat", Lazarides Rathbone, London (2012)
- "Headless Heroes", Lazarides Rathbone, London (2009)
- "Weekend Warriors", The Outsiders London (2008)

Group exhibitions

- Hang-Up Collections Volume III, Hang-Up Gallery, London (2015)
- Spring Group Show, Mead Carney Fine Art, London (2015)
- Art Truancy: Celebrating 20 Years of Juxtapoz Magazine, Jonathan LeVine Gallery, New York (2014)
- Brutal, Lazarides Gallery, London (2013)
- Twente Biënnale, Twente Biënnale, Enschede (2013)
- Bedlam, Lazarides pop-up, Old Vic Tunnels, London (2012)
- The Minotaur, Lazarides pop-up, Old Vic Tunnels, London (2011)
- Inside Sir Paul Smith – His Art, His Photography, His World Daelim Museum of Contemporary Art (2010)
- Euro Trash, Lazarides pop-up, Los Angeles (2010)
- The Outsiders, The New Art Gallery, Walsall (2009)
- The Outsiders New York, Lazarides pop-up, New York (2008)
- Outsiders, Lazarides Rathbone, London (2008)

== Sources ==
- "Conor Harrington Biography". lazinc.com.
- "Conor Harrington Biography". streetartbio.com.
- "Conor Harrington". artsy.net.
- "Conor Harrington: Stakes Is High" . December 1, 2016. juxtapoz.com.
- "Interview: Artist Conor Harrington Discusses How Hip-Hop and Fallen Empires Inspired His "Eat and Delete" Exhibition in New York". October 3, 2014. complex.com.
