= Sprung aus den Wolken =

German band

- Origin: Berlin, Germany
- Genres: Neue Deutsche Welle; Industrial; Experimental
- Years active: Circa 1981 – present
- Labels: Les Disques Du Soleil Et De L'Acier; Faux Pas

Sprung aus den Wolken is a German band based out of Berlin, part of Berlin's underground music movement of the 1980s – sometimes referred to as the "Geniale Dilletanten" movement. Their music is typically minimalistic industrial music.

The band's name is German for "Jump from the Clouds". The origin of this title is unknown, however it should be known that the phrase was the title of a 1963 board game, although the possibility that it is a German idiom or simply just made up should not be ruled out either. Also, "Sprung aus den Wolken" was the title of the German broadcasts of Ripcord in the 1960s.

== Members ==
- Fred Alpi
- Kiddy Citny
- Peter Prima

Contributing artists:

- Alexander Hacke
- N.U. Unruh
- Raymond Watts

== Discography ==
- Dub and Die (1981)
- Untitled (1982)
- Untitled (1983)
- Voyage Organise Dijon 26-08-82 (1983)
- Pas Attendre (1985)
- The Story of Electricity (1987)
- You Lucky Star (circa 1990)
- Round and Round (1991)
- Early Recordings (2004)
- Lion/Sei Still (2005)
- Early Recordings Plus (2006)
