= Kiddy Citny =

German artist and musician

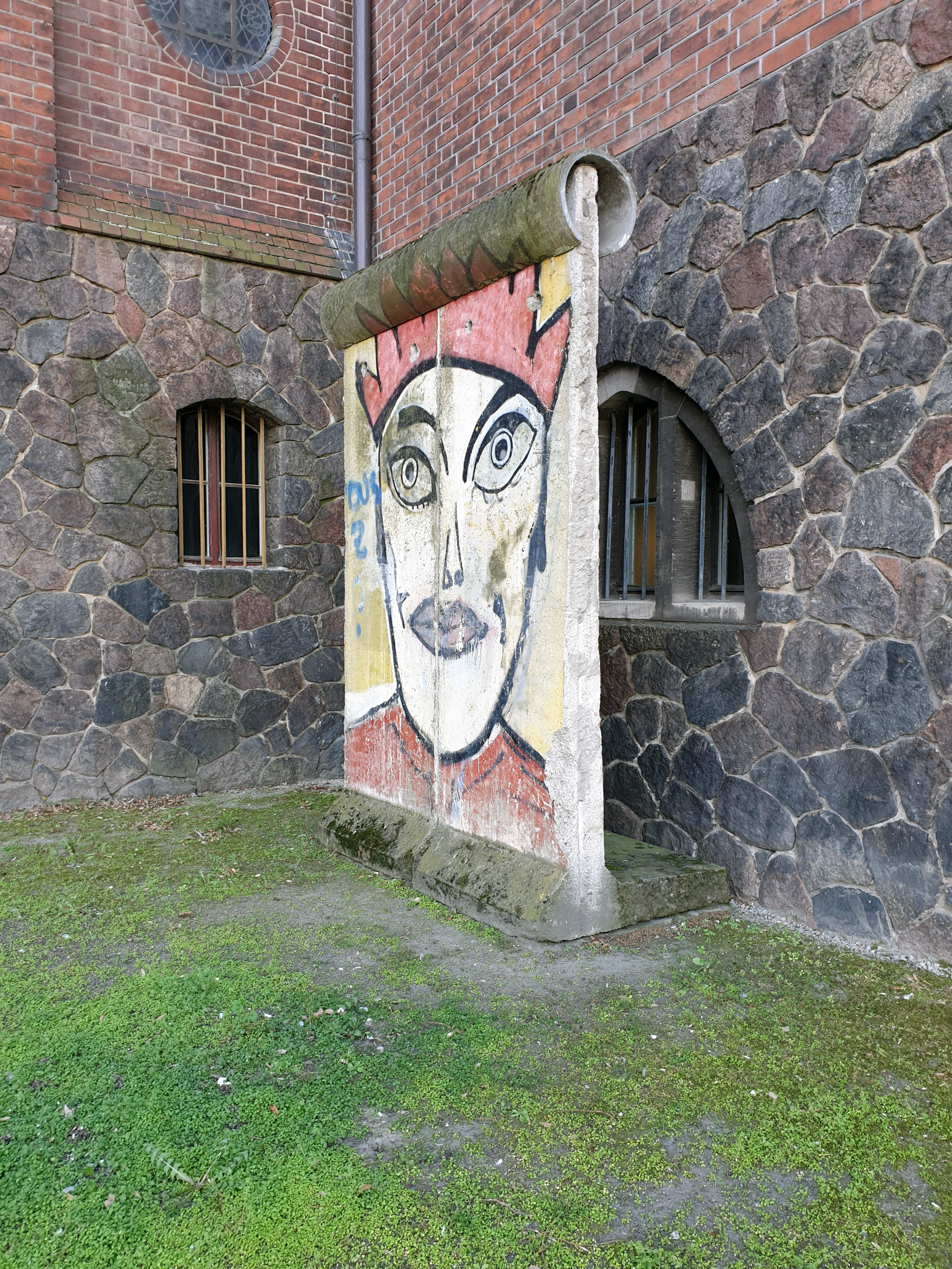
Berlin Wall segment in front of the Märkisches Museum in Berlin-Mitte

Kiddy Citny (born 1957 in Stuttgart) is a German artist and musician. He was raised in Bremen and later moved to West Berlin, Amsterdam, London, Zurich, Bern, Los Angeles, Munich, and Berlin.

Citny is a member of the band Sprung aus den Wolken. As an artist, he often uses pictograms and epigrams in his work. He's known for painting parts of the Berlin Wall, at least a dozen sections of which were auctioned after its fall in 1989. Some segments are now in the United States.

== See also ==
- List of German painters
