= Remi Rough =

British artist

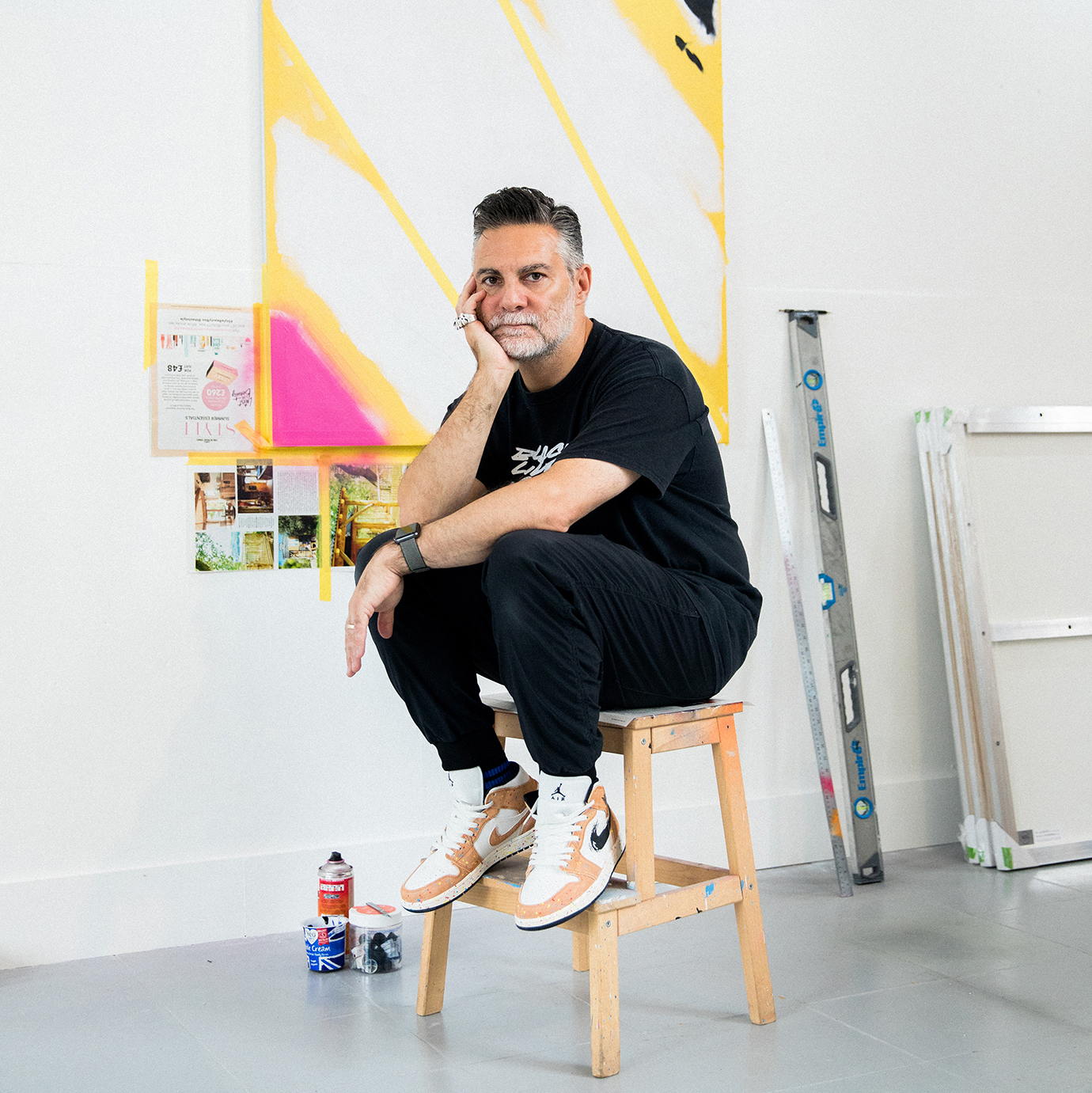
- Portrait of Remi Rough in his studio, 2021
- Born: 1971 (age 54–55); London, England, UK
- Education: Croydon School of Art
- Known for: Painting
- Notable work: The Megaro Hotel, London, Quarry Bay MTR station, Hong Kong, Citibank, Frankfurt, Art Science Museum, Singapore
- Style: Abstract, urban contemporary
- Movement: Graffuturism and Post Graffiti movements
- Spouse: Michelle Morgan
- Children: 1
- Website: remirough.com

Remi Rough (born 1971) is a British abstract and graffiti artist, painter and muralist. He is best known for work that bridges graffiti and street art with fine art abstraction.

In addition, he is one half of rap duo The Dead Can Rap with American Poet and alternative hip-hop artist, Mike Ladd.

His work has been exhibited in Hong Kong, London (United Kingdom), Los Angeles (United States), Paris (France), Perth (Australia), and Tokyo (Japan). He participated in the Dulwich Outdoor Gallery associated with Dulwich Picture Gallery, South East London. He produced a mural in Dulwich, "Girl at a window", based on a picture by Rembrandt in Dulwich Picture Gallery.

== Early life and background ==
Remi Rough was born and raised in South East London, where he first began painting graffiti in the 1980s. Emerging from London's early graffiti scene, he developed a distinctive visual language that blends bold geometry, refined composition, and musical energy, positioning him as a key figure in the post-graffiti and Graffuturism movements.

Initially operating as a style writer, his early work focused on wildstyle lettering. Over time, his artistic focus evolved into abstraction. Key parts of his early career are documented in the book Future Language of the Ikonoklast, published by Velocity Press in 2025.

He spent a formative period in Paris in the 1990s, where he connected with members of the Bad Boys Crew and artists such as LOKISS and DARCO from FBI crew. His style during this time was heavily influenced by Parisian writing culture. He went several times in the 90s and describes Paris as his second home then and still to this day. After experimenting a lot in the early beginnings, Rough stripped back to a simpler style in the mid-90s.

He works across multiple surfaces including canvas, wood, concrete, and brick. His paintings and murals are often described as musical or architectural in feeling. His transition from graffiti to abstraction has been documented in key publications, including XL Mural Art by Claudia Walde (2009) and Abstract Graffiti by Cedar Lewisohn (2011).

== Collaborations and group work ==
Rough has collaborated, and been in group shows with artists including Futura, Shepard Fairey Eric Haze Crash, Shok1, MadC, Carlos Mare, JonOne and Stormie Mills.

In 1999, he painted three murals with Banksy, including the mural titled Dogma.

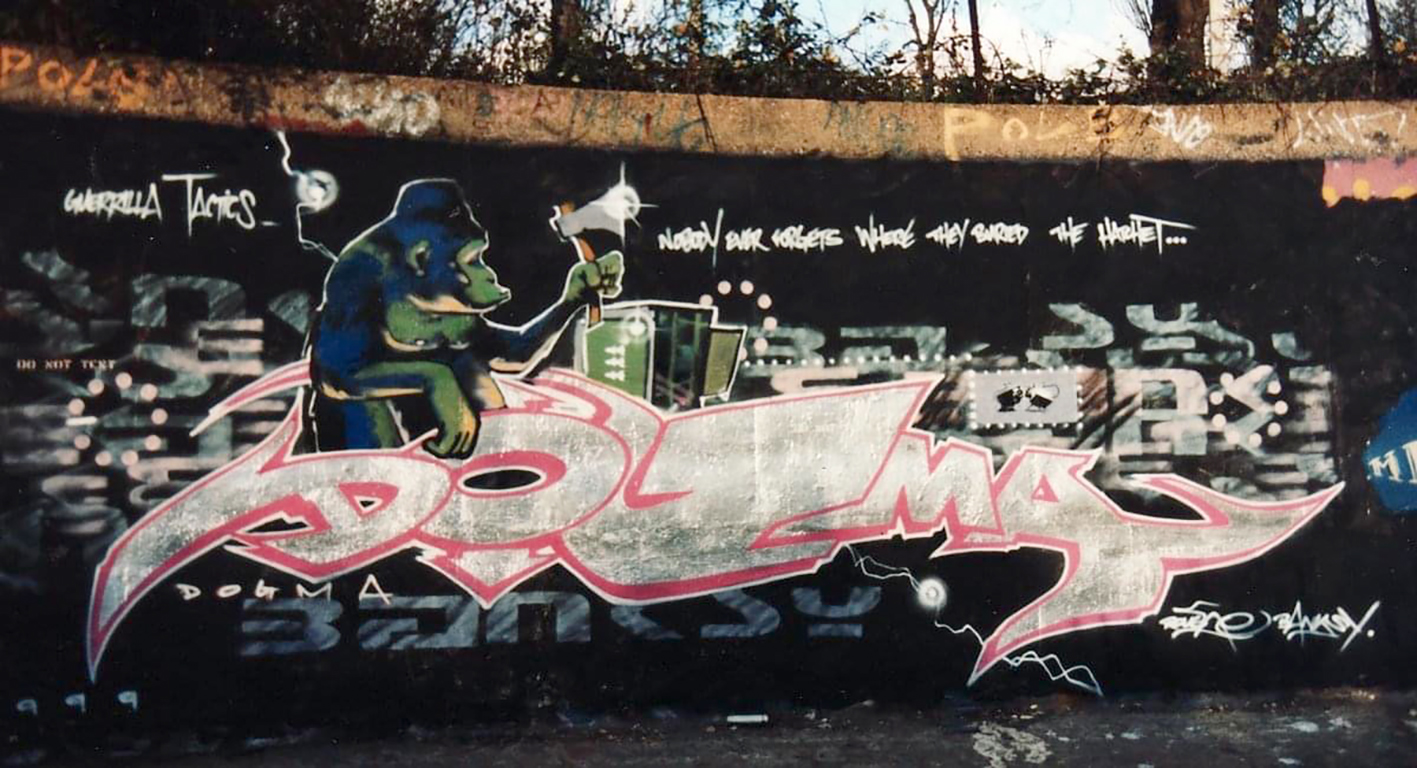
Dogma by Rough and Banksy, 1999

He painted with notable New York graffiti artists A-One and IZ the Wiz.

In 2019 he was commissioned to create a mural for NYC Pride in New York City, USA, as part of the World Mural Project, he featured in a New York Times article covering the project.

In 2020 he participated in the HELP Portfolio, a project of 16 prints by 16 artists supporting 16 charities. Fellow artists included Sue Arrowsmith, Margaret Calvert, Jake and Dinos Chapman, Michael Craig-Martin, Ian Davenport, Nicky Hirst, Idris Khan, Chris Levine, Paul McDevitt, Elizabeth Magill, Annie Morris, Paul Morrison, Remi Rough, Yinka Shonibare CBE, Mathew Weir and Paul Winstanley. The edition was released through Cristea Roberts Gallery.

In 2022 he collaborated with Turner Prize-winning artist Lubaina Himid on a pair of exclusive pyjamas for Pjoys, commissioned by Tate Modern. He is Creative Director of Pjoys, a mental health brand founded by his wife, Michelle Morgan.

In 2025 he was interviewed for BBC Radio London about the Ikonoklast movement and painting with Banksy.

== Music ==
Remi Rough is also a musician, producing experimental and electronic music both as a solo artist and in collaboration. He is one half of Dead Can Rap, a 'genre-defying' musical project formed with American poet and MC Mike Ladd. Their work blends spoken word, hip hop, abstract beats, and sonic experimentation, reflecting the same layered, rhythmic energy present in Rough's visual art. He also releases solo material under his own name, exploring atmospheric soundscapes and beat-based compositions.

== Personal life ==
Remi Rough lives and works in London. He is married to entrepreneur, author and mental health champion Michelle Morgan. They have a daughter.

== Exhibitions ==
Selected Solo Exhibitions
DATE	Title	Gallery	Location
10.23	What Colour Does for the Fragile Mind	The House of St Barnabas	London, UK
09.23	L'Ombre est lumière	Galerie Bessaud	Paris, FR
04.23	Precision Burners	JG Contemporary	London, UK
05.22	W1 Curates		London, UK
06.21	In Real Life	Studio 6	London, UK
09.20	Post Suprematist	Kronos Gallery	Trento, IT
10.19	Air Miles and New Mechanised High-Tech Graffiti Wild Styles	WallworksNY	New York, USA
03.18	Syncopation (with LX One)	Zimmerling and Jungfleisch Gallery	Saarbrücken, DE
09.17	Sound Pigments	Villa Molitor / Danysz Gallery	Paris, FR
04.17	Symphony of Systematic Minimalism	Wunderkammen Gallery	Rome, IT
11.16	Post	Speertstra Gallery	Bursins, CH
10.15	Home	Scream Gallery	London, UK
10.14	Motivational Therapy	Whitewalls Gallery	San Francisco, USA
07.14	Further Adventures in Abstraction	Soze Gallery	Los Angeles, USA
10.12	In the Presence of Angels	Soze Gallery	Los Angeles, USA

Selected Group Exhibitions
DATE	Title	Gallery	Header Location
10.24	Future Language of the Ikonoklast	Fleet Studios	London, UK
06.22	Next Wave: New Contemporaries of the Abstract Movement,	Fort Wayne Museum of Art	Indiana, USA
12.21	Attitude	Palazzo Blu	Pisa, IT
06.21	Post Painterly	Sugarlift	New York, USA
05.21	Pressing Matters	Helium London	London, UK
09.20	Hospital Rooms	Hauser and Wirth	London, UK
02.20	Hospital Rooms	South London Gallery	London, UK
09.19	Watch This Space	Lazinc / Danysz Gallery	London, UK
04.19	Happy Hour	Kristin Hjellegjerde Gallery	London, UK
02.19	Graffuturism	L'Alternatif	Paris, FR
10.18	Interlude	The House of St Barnabas	London, UK
02.18	Art from the Streets	Art Science Museum / Danysz Gallery	Singapore
11.17	The Discerning Eye	The Mall Galleries	London, UK
10.17	Compendium	Treason Gallery	Seattle, USA
09.17	Adventures in Abstraction	Stolen Space Gallery	London, UK
05.17	Street Generations	La Condition Publique / Danysz Gallery	Roubaix, FR
03.17	MTV Re-Define	Dallas Contemporary	Dallas, USA
04.16	Jidar	Musée Mohammed VI	Rabat, MAR
02.16	MB6 Marrakech Biennale		Marrakech, MAR
06.15	Street Art	Pace Gallery	London, UK
06.15	Public Provocations	Colab Gallery	Weil am Rhein, DE
05.15	Ambiguity	Zimmerling & Jungfleisch	Saarbrücken, DE
03.15	Urban Art Biennale	The Völklinger Hütte Museum	Völklingen, DE
