= James Reka =

Australian street artist

Reka One
- Notable work: The Doge and The Gondolier
- Style: Street art
- Movement: Graffiti
- Website: rekaone.com

Tag

James Reka (aka "REKA" and "Reka One") is a street artist from Melbourne, Australia, later based in Berlin, Germany. Reka first started as a graffiti artist in the 1990s, moving to street art including large murals later.

His work is in the permanent collection of the National Gallery of Australia and he has exhibited worldwide. He participated in the Dulwich Outdoor Gallery associated with Dulwich Picture Gallery, southeast London. In 2019 he created a large mural work for the Venice Biennale entitled The Doge and The Gondolier.

== See also ==
- Backwoods Gallery, Melbourne, Australia
