= Mear One =

American graffiti artist (born 1971)

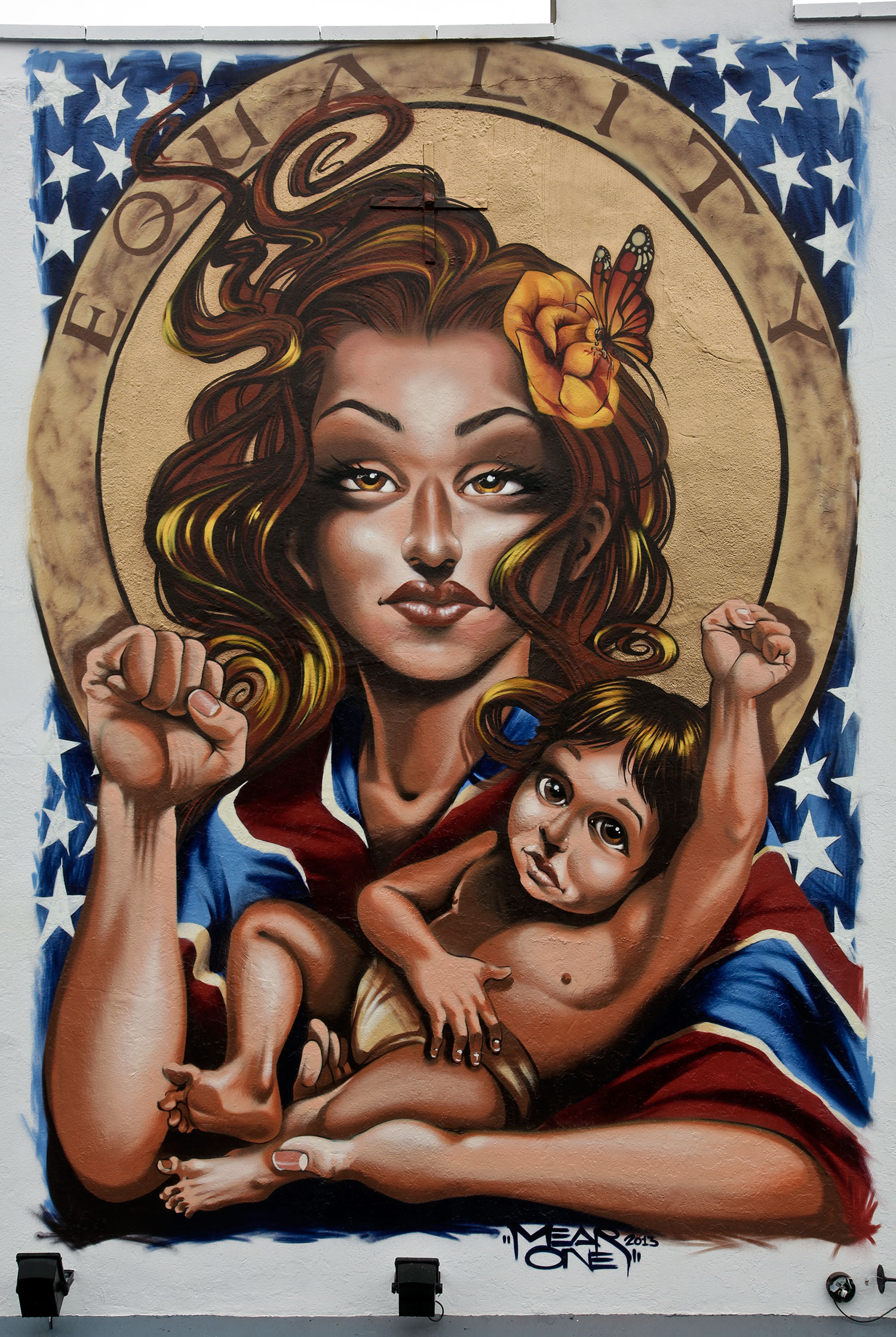
- Mear One interpretation of The Madonna of the Rosary by Bartolomé Murillo in Dulwich Picture Gallery, produced for Dulwich Outdoor Gallery, Dulwich, South London, England, 2013
- Born: Kalen Ockerman; 1971 (age 54–55); Santa Cruz, California, United States
- Known for: Painter, muralist, graffiti
- Website: mearone.com

Mear One (born 1971 as Kalen Ockerman) is an American artist and based in Los Angeles, known for his often-political and sometimes conspiracy theory-inspired street graffiti art. Mear One is associated with CBS (Can't Be Stopped – City Bomb Squad) and WCA (West Coast Artist) crews. As a graphic designer, Mear One has designed apparel for Conart, Kaotic, as well as his own Reform brand. Mear One has designed album covers for musicians such as Non Phixion, Freestyle Fellowship, Alien Nation, Limp Bizkit, Visionaries, Busdriver and Daddy Kev.

== Early life and education ==
Ockerman was born in 1971 in Santa Cruz, California, but was raised and resides in Los Angeles.

== Career ==
A street artist and graffiti writer in Los Angeles for over 20 years, Mear's partners have included Skate One, Anger, Yem, and Cisco CBS.

In 2004, Mear joined artists Shepard Fairey and Robbie Conal to create a series of "anti-war, anti-Bush" posters for a street art campaign called "Be the Revolution" for the art collective Post Gen.

In September 2012, Mear One painted a temporary street mural in Hanbury Street, London, entitled Freedom for Humanity. It depicted suited men seated around a table, under an Eye of Providence, playing a Monopoly-like board game that rested on the backs of bent-over naked figures, with a background of industry and protest. A local councillor likened it to antisemitic propaganda in pre-war Germany, referencing what he saw as its stereotypical depictions of Jews, together with its reference to finance and the monetary and Masonic associations of the Eye of Providence. The Mayor of Tower Hamlets, Lutfur Rahman, said: "The images of the bankers perpetuate anti-Semitic propaganda about conspiratorial Jewish domination of financial and political institutions."

In April 2014, Mear appeared with fellow graffiti-muralists Cache, EyeOne, and Alice Mizrachi at Brown University as part of the panel Bottom-Up Place Making: Graffiti-murals and Latino/a Urbanism, hosted by the Center for the Study of Race and Ethnicity in America and moderated by University of Arizona urban theorist, graffiti writer, and professor, Stefano Bloch.

In 2015, he was a judge on Oxygen Channel's "Street Art Throw Down" hosted by poster artist Justin Bua.
