= Phlegm (artist) =

British artist

- Born: Unknown
- Known for: Street art

Phlegm is London-based muralist and artist who first developed his illustrations in self-published comics. The name 'Phlegm' came from one of the four temperaments in ancient Greek medicine: blood, yellow bile, black bile, and phlegm. Phlegm was believed to be responsible for an apathetic and unemotional temperament.

== Overview ==
Phlegm's work features in the urban landscape, and can mostly be seen in run-down and disused spaces. Phlegm creates surreal illustrations to an untold story, weaving a visual narrative that explores the unreal through creatures from his imagination.

Phlegm's storybook-like imagery is half childlike, half menacing, set in built up Cityscapes with castles, turrets and winding stairways. His work has also appeared in a variety of objects such as airplanes, boats, buildings, vehicles and street art festivals.

== Exhibitions ==
Phlegm's first solo show The Bestiary took place at the Howard Griffin Gallery on Shoreditch High Street, London from 1 February to 25 March 2014.

In April 2019 he hosted 'Mausoleum of the Giants' in Sheffield, attracting over 12,000 visitors.

== Murals ==
In January 2013, Phlegm painted on the Village Underground wall in London, UK.

In February 2014, Phlegm teamed up with RUN and Christiaan Nagel to paint a soon to be demolished building in London – the Blithehale Medical Centre in Bethnal Green.

In April and May 2014, Phlegm was one of several overseas artists to paint a series of murals in Dunedin, New Zealand as part of that city's Urban art festival. Other artists involved included Italy's Pixel Pancho and Poland's Natalia Rak.

Phlegm was one of around 150 artists to paint murals in the Djerbahood Project in Erriadh, Tunisia, in the summer of 2014.

In April 2015, Phlegm painted a large mural of an octopus on the old Naval Store building in Fremantle, Western Australia.

In August 2016, Phlegm painted what was billed as the world's tallest mural to that time (8 storeys) in Toronto at 1 St. Clair West. Toronto resident Stephanie Bellefleur was his assistant.
