= Christiaan Nagel =

British street artist (born 1982)

- Born: November 30, 1982 (age 43); Durban, South Africa
- Known for: Street art Sculpture
- Website: http://christiaannagel.co.uk/

Christiaan Nagel is a British street artist known for his oversized mushroom sculptures made from polyurethane which he places high up on buildings. They stretch as far as London, New York, Barcelona, Berlin, Cape Town, Los Angeles

== Early life and career ==
Nagel was born in South Africa and grew up in Durban. As a part of the Durban surfing community he participated as a member of this subculture of surf and skate for most of his life. Since his artistic beginnings, he attended art classes and one of his first accomplishments was ABSA Bank award for children that he was awarded when he was seven years old. In high school he worked and studied under the guidance of Scottish artist Fiona Kirkwood. During that period, he experimented with a range of popular mediums such as drawing, charcoal, painting and sculpting.

== Notable works ==
One of his recent exhibitions is named “The FI of The Underworld” and it follows the story of metaphysical fish swimming through physical objects. It's all based on a mushroom trip, a hallucination.

He installed the Mega Mushroom, a 7 meter high sculpture at the Urban Spree Gallery in Berlin.

A second Mega Mushroom was installed on 24 May 2016 at the Red Gallery in Shoreditch, London.

In addition to mushrooms featuring as part of a broader narrative, he is working on a fantasy book exploring the subjects of perception, consciousness and dream content. He has also expressed an ambition to build Mushroom Land, a proposed theme park that would provide a setting for his story and its characters.

Aside from street art, Nagel is also a skilled musician, guitarist, composer and singer. He has designed his own guitar, "The Nail" which was built by German guitar builder, Jozsi Lak.

== Collaborations ==
In February 2014, Nagel teamed up with RUN and Sheffield-based artist Phlegm on a mission to give final moments of vivacious life to yet another to be demolished building in London - the Blithehale Medical Centre in Bethnal Green.
