= MadC =

German graffiti artist (born 1980)

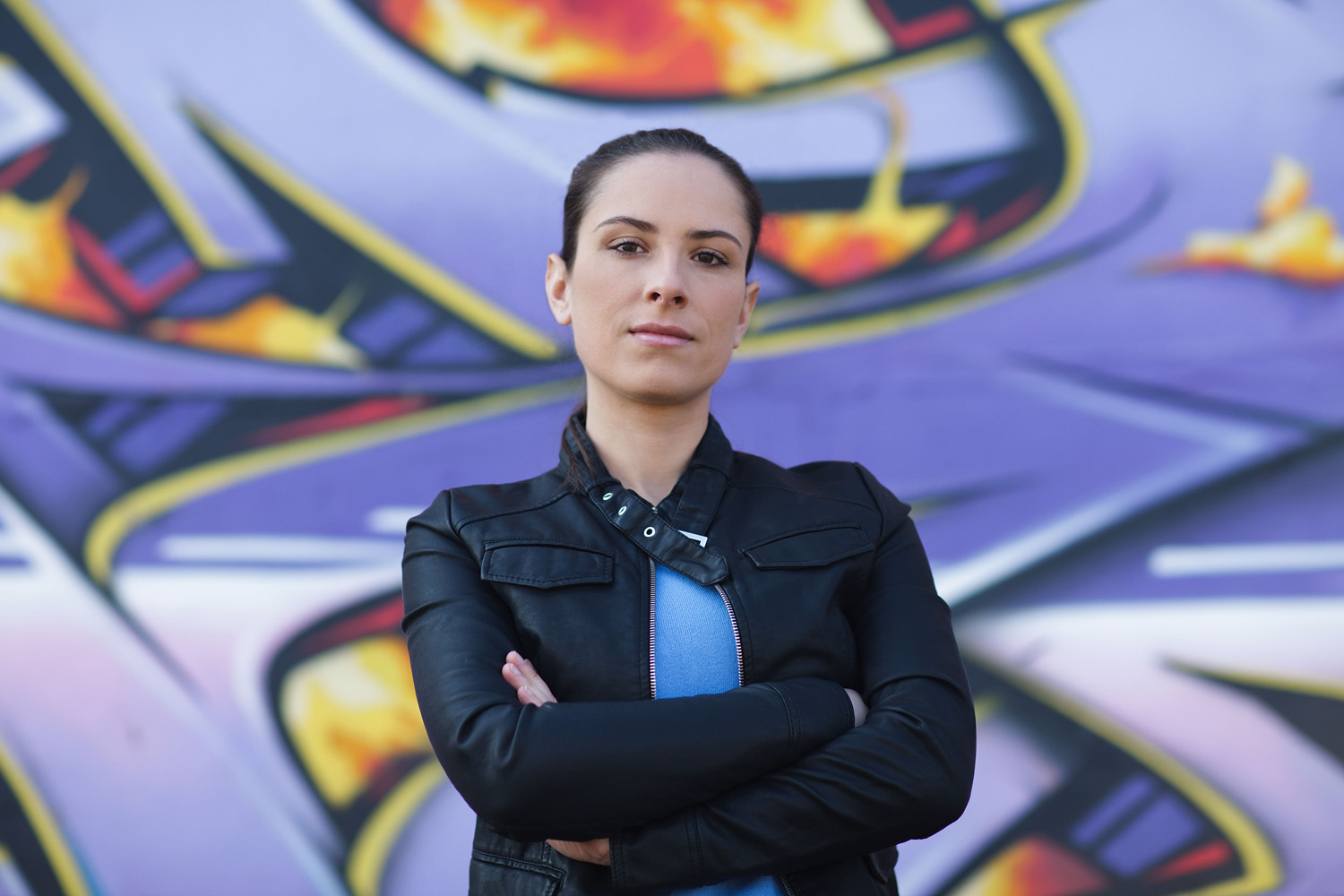
- Born: Claudia Walde; 1980 (age 45–46); Bautzen, Lusatia
- Education: Burg Giebichenstein University of Art and Design; Central Saint Martins
- Notable work: The 700-Wall
- Movement: Street Art
- Website: madc.tv

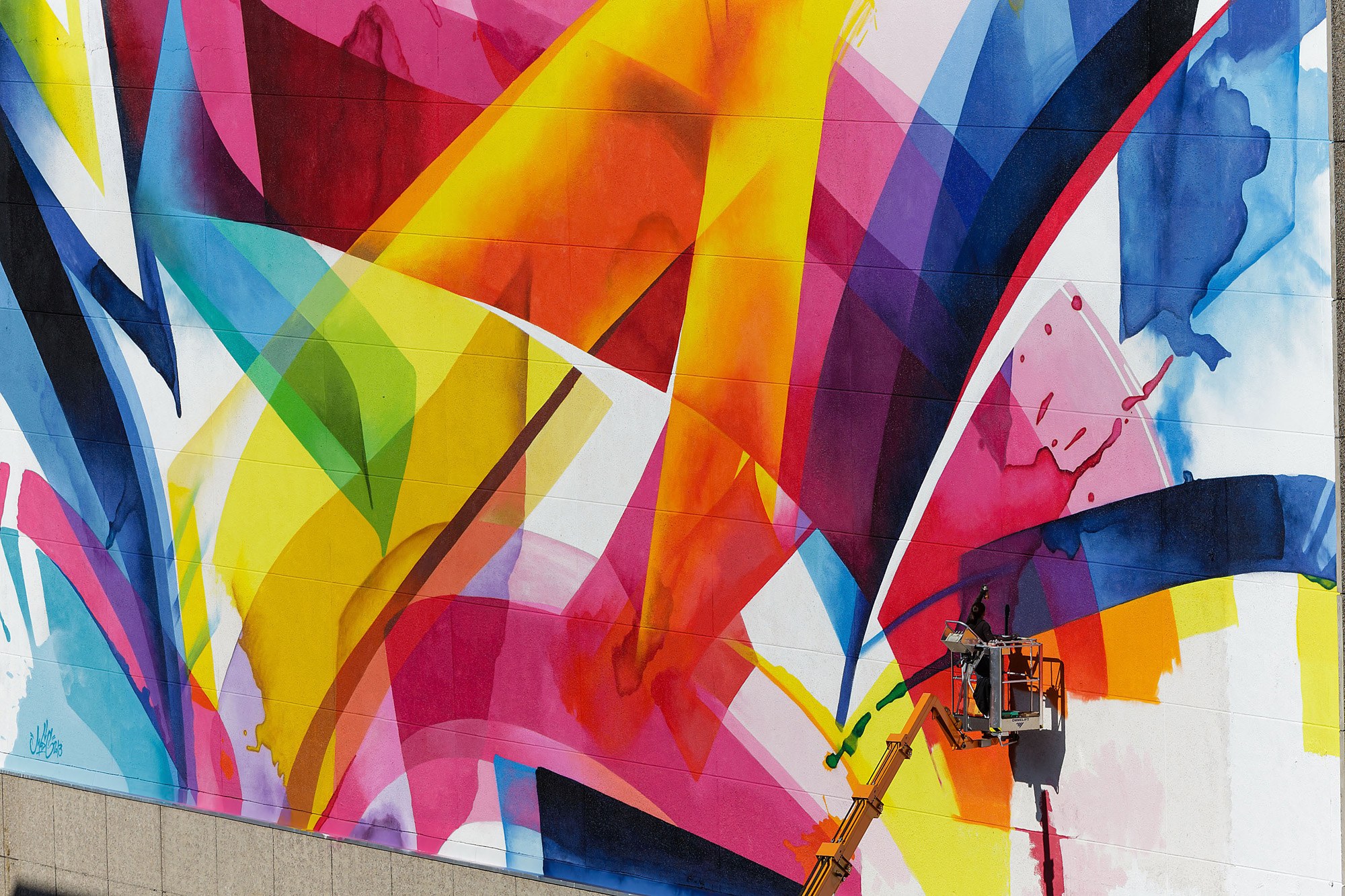
MadC's work, 500Wall, Leipzig

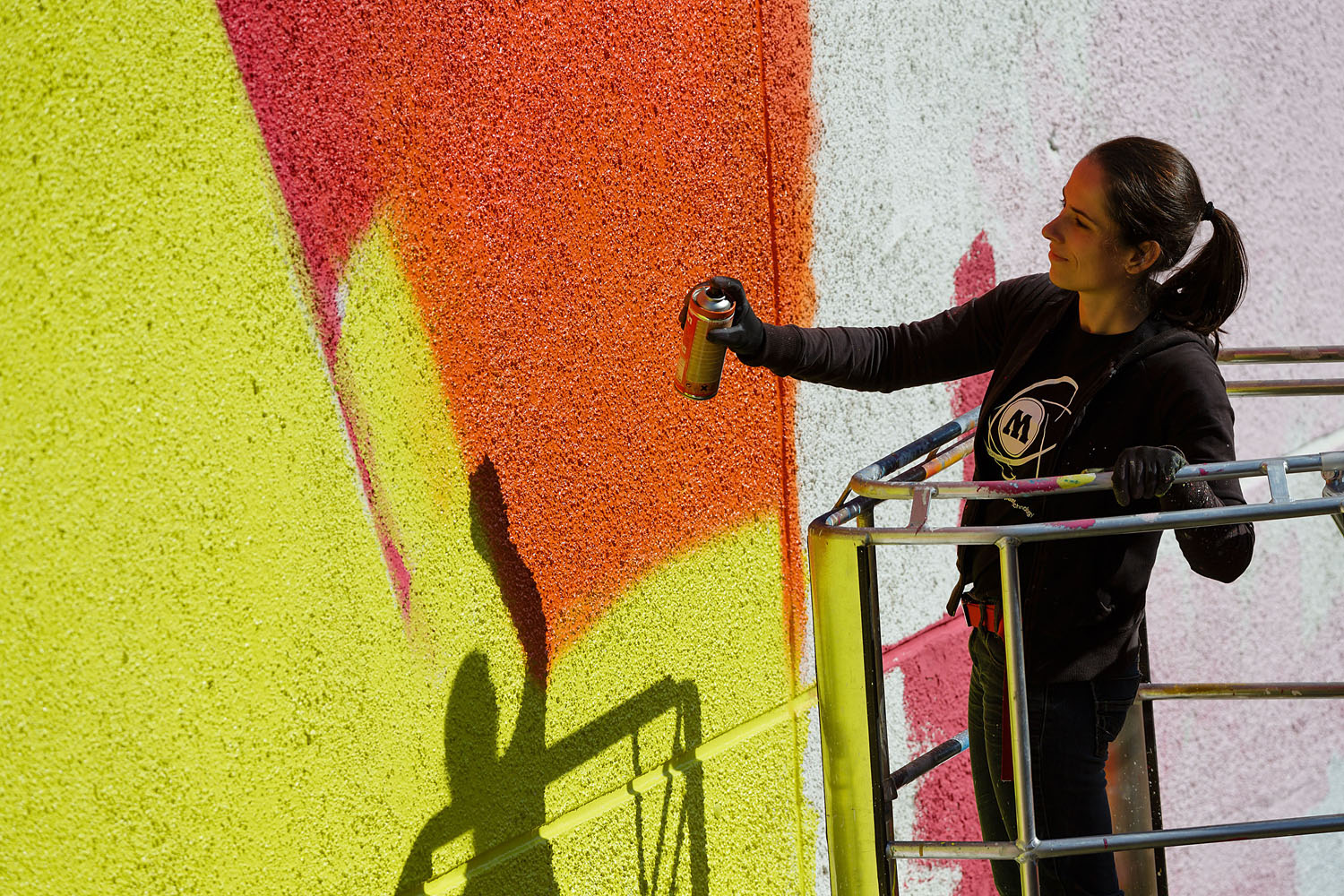
MadC

MadC (born Claudia Walde, 1980) is a graffiti writer and muralist. She was born in Bautzen, Germany, and is most known for her large-scale, outdoor artistic paintings.

MadC started as a teenage graffiti writer and has since developed her creative endeavors into various related fields (including as graphic design, writing, and fine art). MadC painted her first graffiti piece in 1996, being 16 years old. She studied at Burg Giebichenstein University of Art and Design in Halle and Central Saint Martins College in London. MadC carries a master's degree in graphic design.

== Major works ==
=== Books (as Claudia Walde) ===
- Sticker City – Paper Graffiti Art (2007)
- Street Fonts - Graffiti Alphabets From Around The World (2011). Work from 154 artists, ranging from 30 different countries. In the creation of the book, MadC directed artists to use international alphabets that she had spent two years traveling the world to collect.
- Mural XXL (2015)

=== 700 Wall ===
Her major international breakthrough came however in 2010 with the production of the work that has become known as the 700-Wall – a 700 square-meter work along the train line between Berlin and Halle. This painting is most likely the largest graffiti mural created by a single person, taking four months to finish.

== Art style ==
MadC's move from street art to gallery work was a transformation, as she explains, "taking the street energy to a canvas and how spray paint translated differently onto canvas". She later moved on to 'Spectra' Paint, which had a transparent effect on her work with spray paint. She has also been known to use ink, watercolor, acrylic paint and acrylic markers in her work.

Her tagging style incorporates science fiction and fantasy elements, and is influenced by such artists as Vincent Van Gogh and the late graffiti artist Dare (real name Siegfried von Koeding, whom she collaborated with on his piece Basel). Walde dedicated her piece 6313 – Here to Stay to Dare.

Mad C also works with spray paints on canvas. At her first solo gallery in 2015, Night and Day, she showcased works such as Nineteen Nineteen and Twenty One Zero Six. These works had either a black or white base (symbolic of her night and day work required of her for tagging), and investigated “the relationship between overlapping colors, light, glass and calligraphic movement”. For her canvases she is transferring her philosophy of connecting single parts to one piece – background, foreground, lines and shapes. To create those works, MadC uses spray paint, transparent spray paint, ink, watercolor, acrylic paint and acrylic markers. She paints on canvas, as well as carton, from spray paint boxes.

After 700 Wall, MadC built a new body of work, which became part of the Reflections show at Kolly Gallery in 2014. The same year, she screatedThe Tahiti Mural in Tahiti.

- 2013: Shoreditch and Chance, East London
- 2013: Le Mur Paris (France)
- 2013: 500Wall (Germany), Graffiti
- 2019: 18-story mural New Jersey

== Exhibitions ==
- 2011: MadABC, Pure Evil Gallery, London
- 2011: Between the Lines, La Grille Gallery, Yverdon, Switzerland
- 2012: Paper Party, Galerie Le Feuvre, Paris
- 2012: Team Rex, Red Gallery, London
- 2012: layers, 44309 Galerie, Dortmund, Germany
- 2012: Over the Edge, 1AM Gallery, San Francisco, CA
- 2013: Urban Contemporary Art, Galerie Le Feuvre, Paris
- 2013: Billboard Painters, Galleri NB, Viborg, Denmark
- 2013: Innovative Art, Reutov Museum, Reutov, Russia
- 2014: First Taste, Wallworks New York, New York City
- 2014: Reflections, Kolly Gallery, Zurich, Switzerland
- 2015: Bits and Pieces, Wallworks New York, New York City
- 2015: Character, Pure Evil Gallery, London
- 2015: Night and Day, 44309 Street Art Gallery, Dortmund, Germany
- 2015: Who's Your Daddy? (group show), Lausanne, Switzerland
- 2015: The Bright Side of Life, Galerie Brugier-Rigail, Paris
- 2016: Home Sweet Home, Galerie Brugier-Rigail, Paris
- 2016: Kaleidoscope, Kolly Gallery, Zurich, Switzerland
- 2017: Radius, Urban Nation, Berlin
- 2017: Urban Art Biennale, Völklinger Hütte, Saarbrücken, Germany
- 2017: For The Love of Freedom, Art and Museum Centre Sinkka, Finland
- 2018: Daydreaming, 44309 Street Art Gallery, Dortmund, Germany
- 2018: Rakkaudesta vapauteen, The Oulu Museum Of Art, Oulu, Finland
- 2019: Dialog, Brenners Park-Hotel, Baden-Baden, Germany
- 2019: Conquête Urbaine, Fine Arts Museum of Calais, France

== Bibliography ==
- Sticker City Thames & Hudson, London, 2007, ISBN 978-0-50-02-8668-5.
- Street Fonts - Graffiti Alphabets from Around the World, Thames & Hudson, London, 2011, ISBN 978-0-50-05-1559-4.
- Graffiti and Street Art Anna Wacławek, Thames & Hudson, London, 2011, ISBN 978-3422071100
- Mural XXL, Thames & Hudson, London 2015, ISBN 9780500239308
- MadC: Street to Canvas, Heni Publishing, 2021, ISBN 978-1912122431
