= Neo-futurism =

Architectural and art movement and style

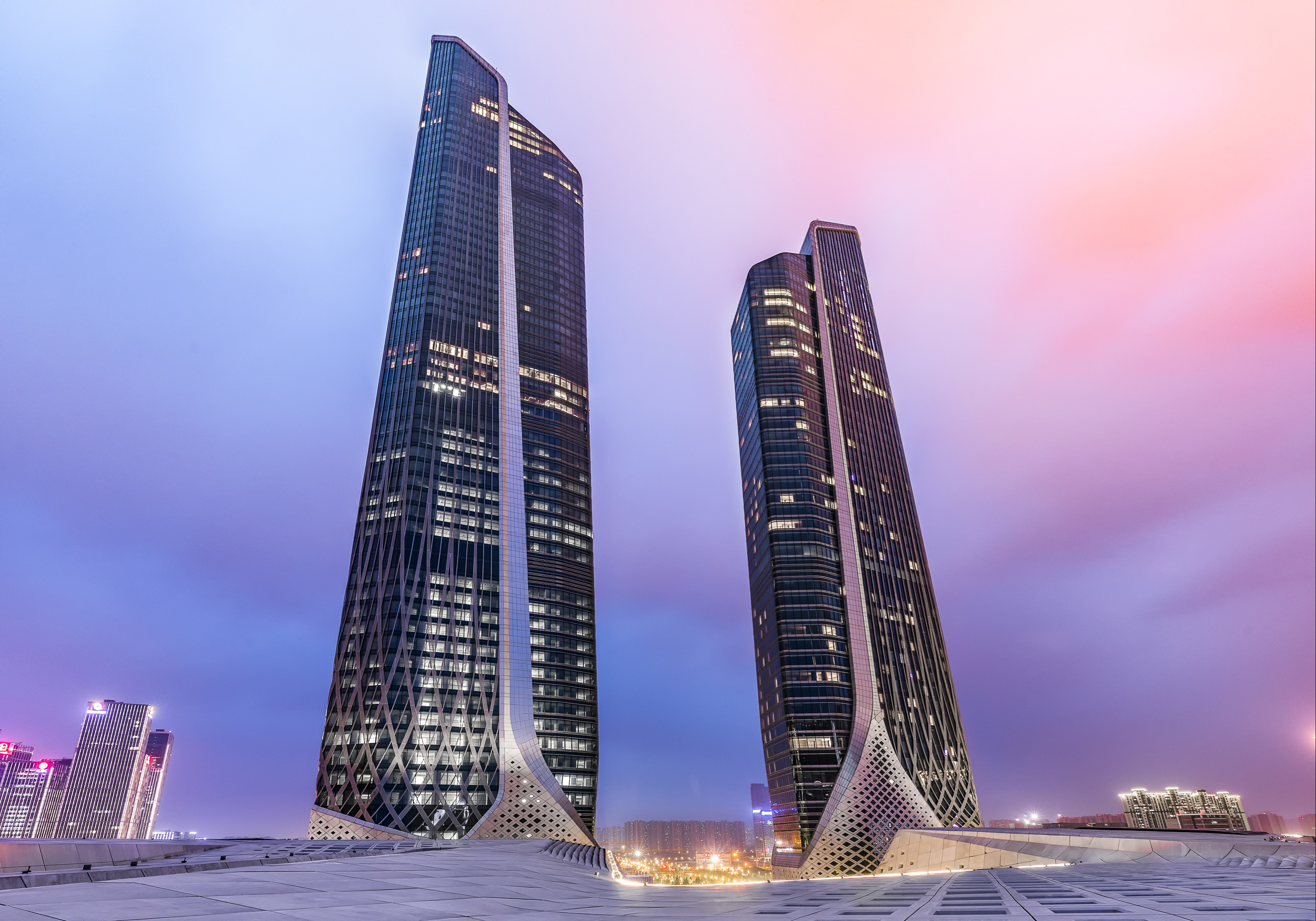
- Nanjing International Youth Cultural Centre, a neo-futuristic skyscraper in Nanjing, China
- Years active: 1990s–present
- Location: International
- Major figures: Peter Cook, Cedric Price, Renzo Piano, Richard Rogers, Norman Foster, Santiago Calatrava, Zaha Hadid
- Influences: Futurism, high-tech architecture
- Influenced: Parametricism

Neo-futurism is a late-20th- to early-21st-century movement in the arts, design, and architecture.

Described as an avant-garde movement, as well as a futuristic rethinking of the thought behind aesthetics and functionality of design in growing cities, the movement has its origins in the mid-20th-century structural expressionist work of architects such as Alvar Aalto and Buckminster Fuller.

Futurist architecture began in the early 20th century in Italy focusing on the future, valuing speed, risk and heroism; while Neo-futurism was defined in the 1980s as a broader movement that appeared in the 1950s and continues today.

== Origins ==
Beginning in the late 1960s and early 1970s by architects such as Buckminster Fuller and John C. Portman Jr.; architect and industrial designer Eero Saarinen, Archigram, an avant-garde architectural group (Peter Cook, Warren Chalk, Ron Herron, Dennis Crompton, Michael Webb and David Greene, Jan Kaplický and others); it is considered in part an evolution out of high-tech architecture, developing many of the same themes and ideas.

Although it was never built, the Fun Palace (1961), interpreted by architect Cedric Price as a "giant neo-futurist machine", influenced other architects, notably Richard Rogers and Renzo Piano, whose Centre Pompidou extended many of Price's ideas.

== Definition ==
Neo-futurism was in part revitalised in 2007 after the publication of "The Neo-Futuristic City Manifesto" included in the candidature presented to the Bureau International des Expositions (BIE) and written by innovation designer Vito Di Bari (a former executive director at UNESCO), to outline his vision for the city of Milan at the time of the Universal Expo 2015. Di Bari defined his neo-futuristic vision as the "cross-pollination of art, cutting edge technologies and ethical values combined to create a pervasively higher quality of life"; he referenced the Fourth Pillar of Sustainable Development Theory and reported that the name had been inspired by the United Nations report Our Common Future.

Soon after Di Bari's manifesto, a collective in the UK called The Neo-Futurist Collective, launched their own version of the Neo-futurist manifesto, written by Rowena Easton, on the streets of Brighton on 20 February 2008, to mark the 99th anniversary of the publication of the Futurist manifesto by FT Marinetti in 1909. The collective's take on Neo-Futurism was much different to Di Bari's, in a sense that it focused on acknowledging the legacy of the Italian Futurists as well as criticising our current state of despair over climate change and the financial system. On their introduction to their manifesto, The Neo-Futurist Collective noted: “In an age of mass despair over the state of the planet and the financial system, the futurist legacy of optimism for the power of technology uniting with the imagination of humanity has a powerful resonance for our modern age”. This shows an interpretation of Neo-Futurism that is more socially involved – one that speaks directly to its followers rather than denoting certain outlooks through actions (e.g. choice of eco-aware materials in Neo-Futurist architecture).

Jean-Louis Cohen has defined neo-futurism as a corollary to technology, noting that a large amount of the structures built today are byproducts of new materials and concepts about the function of large-scale constructions in society. Etan J. Ilfeld wrote that in the contemporary neo-futurist aesthetic "the machine becomes an integral element of the creative process itself, and generates the emergence of artistic modes that would have been impossible prior to computer technology." Reyner Banham's definition of "une architecture autre" is a call for an architecture that technologically overcomes all previous architectures but possessing an expressive form, as Banham stated about neo-futuristic "Archigram's Plug-in Computerized City, form does not have to follow function into oblivion."

Matthew Phillips defined the Neo-Futurist aesthetic as a "manipulation of time, space, and subject against a backdrop of technological innovation and domination, [that] posits new approaches to the future contrary to those of past avant-gardes and current technocratic philosophies". This definition agrees with the work of Neo-Futurist architects whose approach is situated in the context of technological innovation, but does not mention the ecological mindfulness that stems from architectural Neo-Futurism.

== In art and architecture ==
Neo-futurism was inspired partly by Futurist architect Antonio Sant'Elia and pioneered from the early 1960s and the late 1970s by Hal Foster, with architects such as William Pereira, Charles Luckman and Henning Larsen.

== People ==
The relaunch of neo-futurism in the 21st century has been creatively inspired by the Pritzker Architecture Prize-winning architect Zaha Hadid and architect Santiago Calatrava.

Neo-futurist architects, designers and artists include people like Denis Laming, Patrick Jouin,Thomas Canto, Yuima Nakazato, artist Simon Stålenhag and graphic designer Charis Tsevis. Neo-futurism has absorbed some high-tech architectural themes and ideas, incorporating elements of high-tech industry and technology іnto building design: Technology and context has been a focus for some architects such as Buckminster Fuller, Norman Foster, Kenzo Tange, Renzo Piano and Richard Rogers.

== Gallery ==
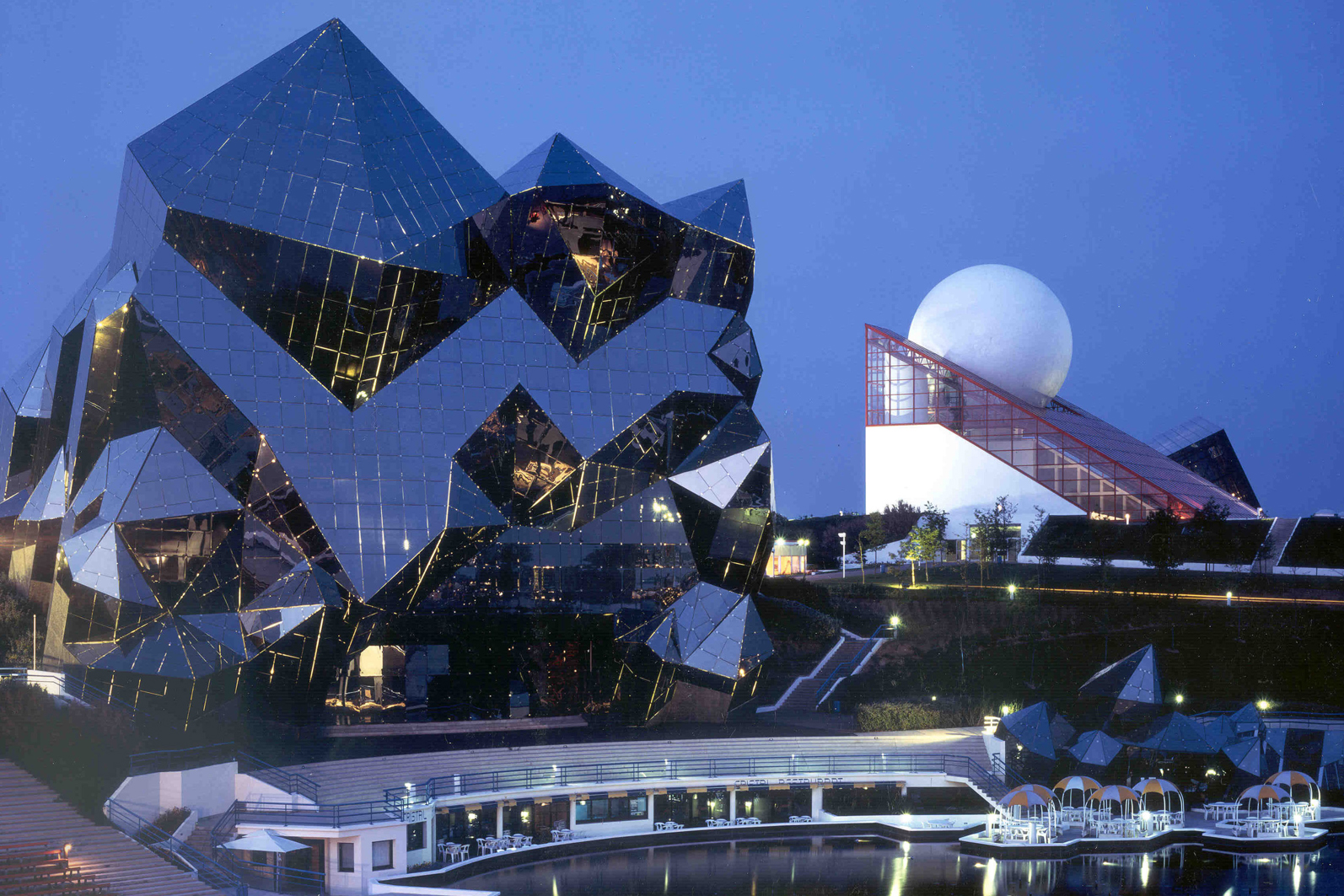
The Pavilions of Futuroscope in Poitiers by Denis Laming, 1984

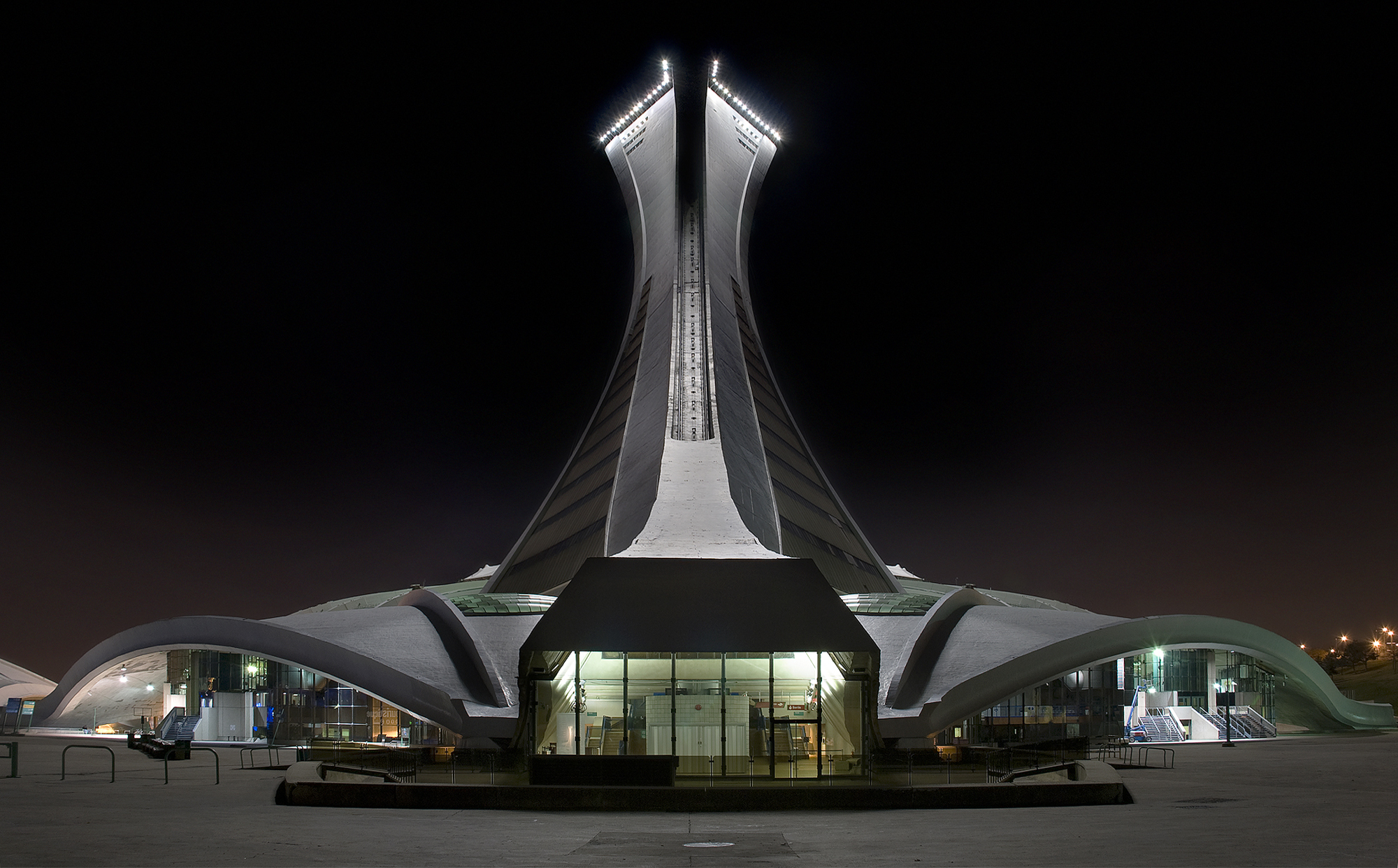
The Tour de Montréal in Montreal by Roger Taillibert, 1987

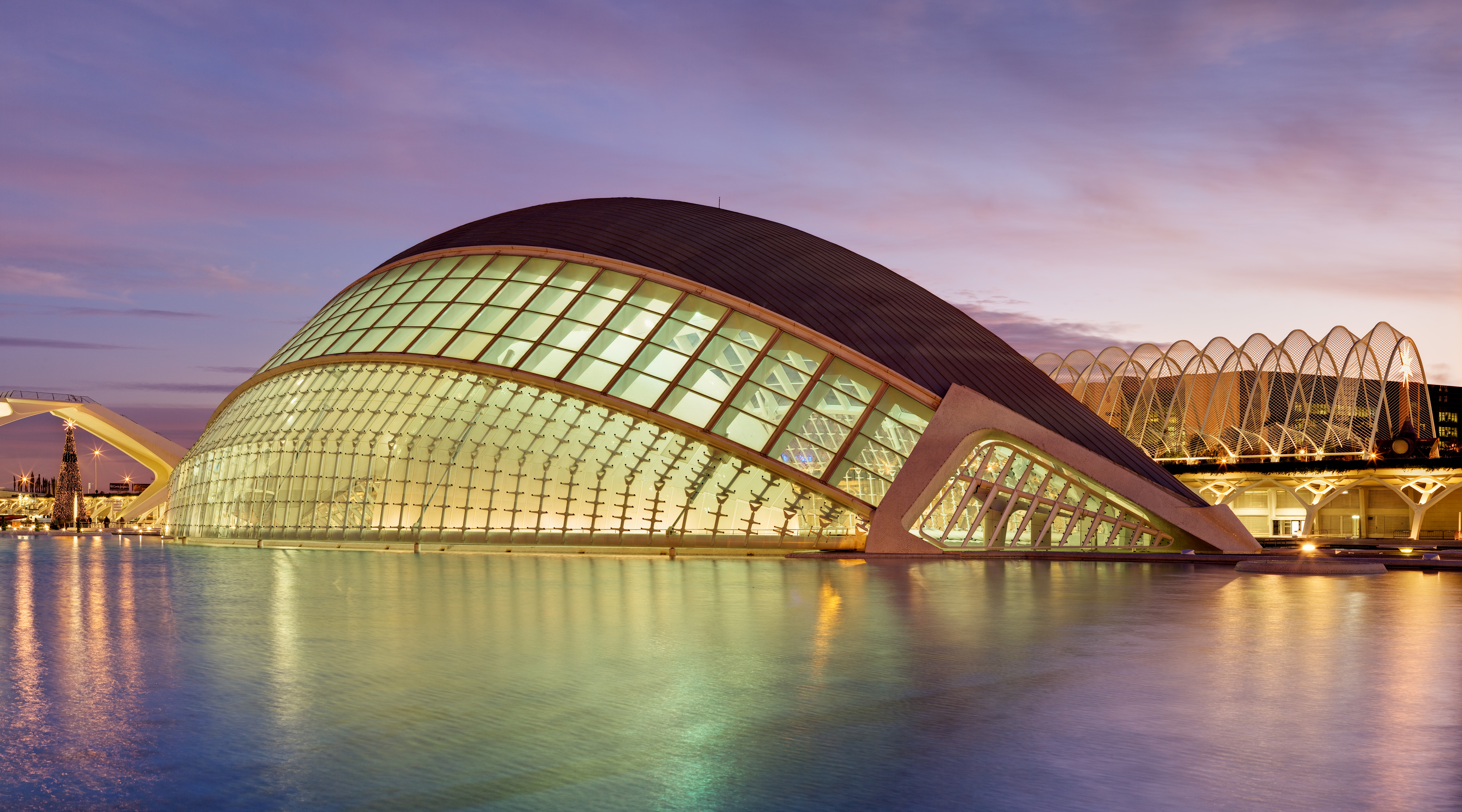
L'Hemisfèric in the City of Arts and Sciences, Valencia by Santiago Calatrava, 1998

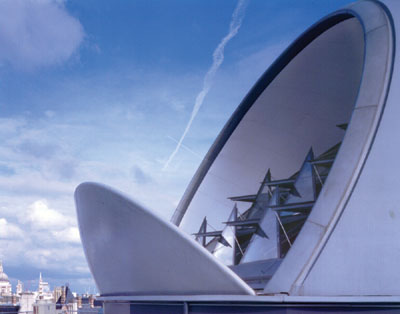
The British Library of Political and Economic Science in London by Norman Foster, 2000

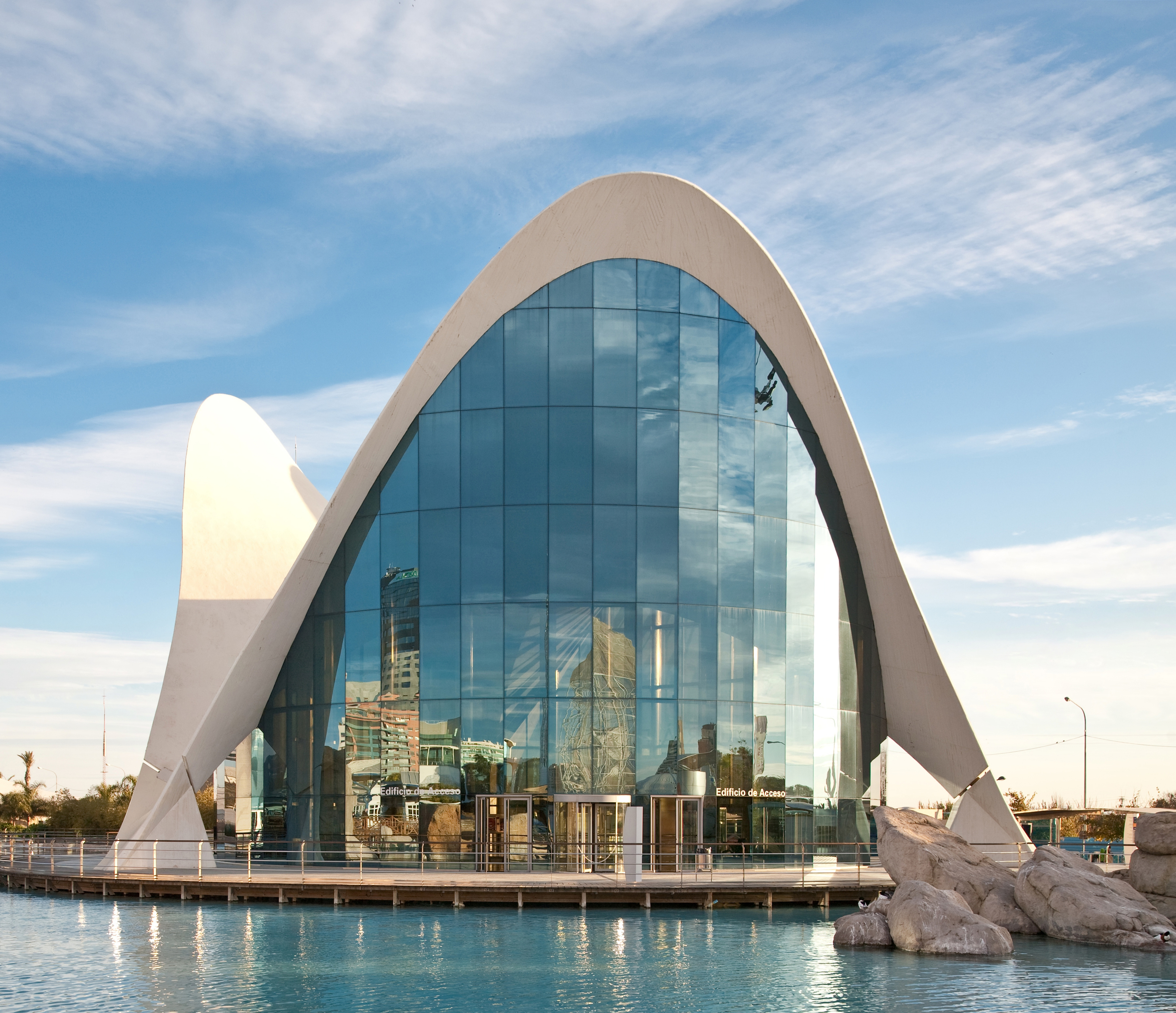
L'Oceanogràfic in the City of Arts and Sciences, Valencia by Félix Candela, 2003

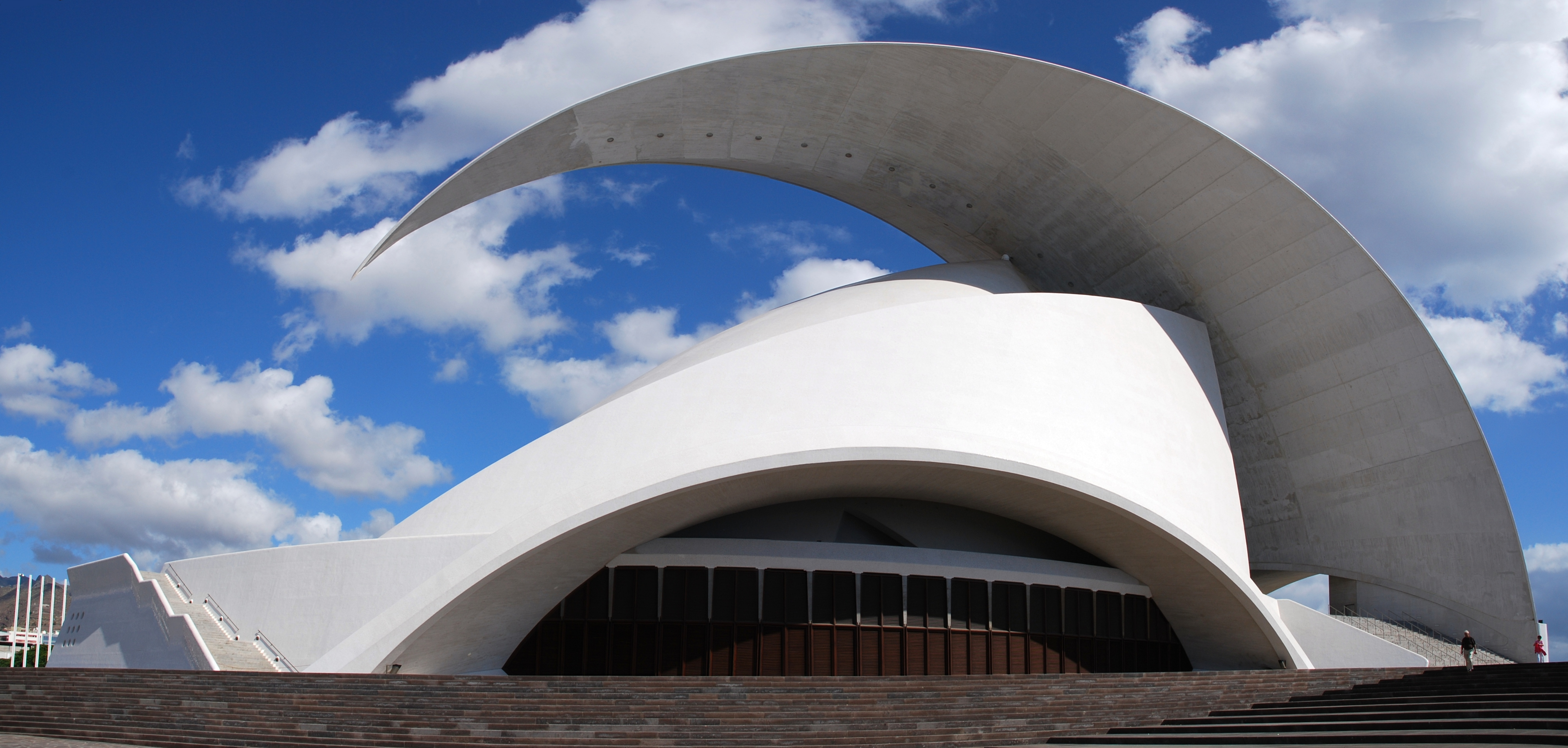
Auditorio de Tenerife in Santa Cruz de Tenerife by Santiago Calatrava, 2003

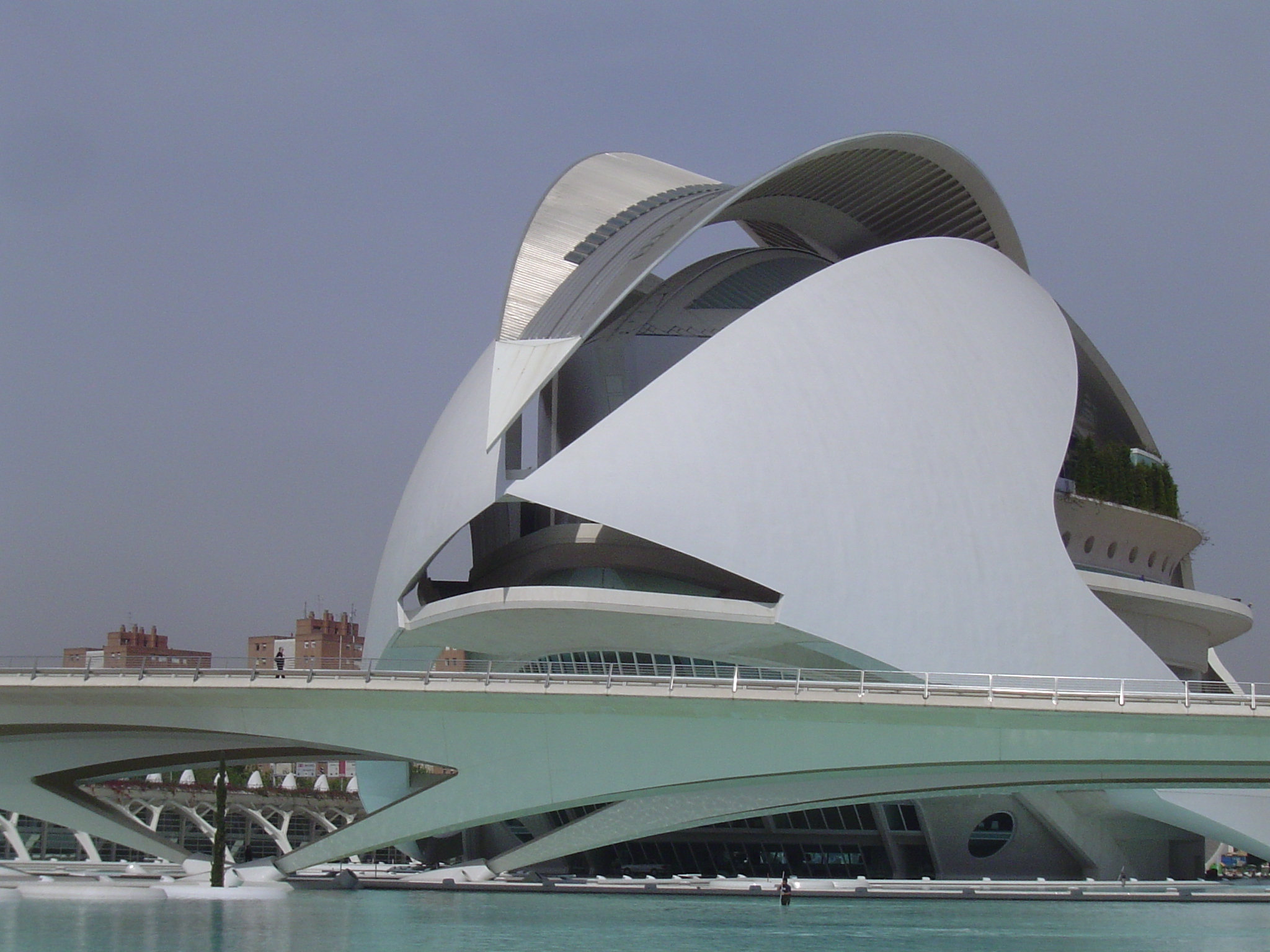
El Palau de les Arts Reina Sofía in the City of Arts and Sciences, Valencia by Santiago Calatrava, 2005

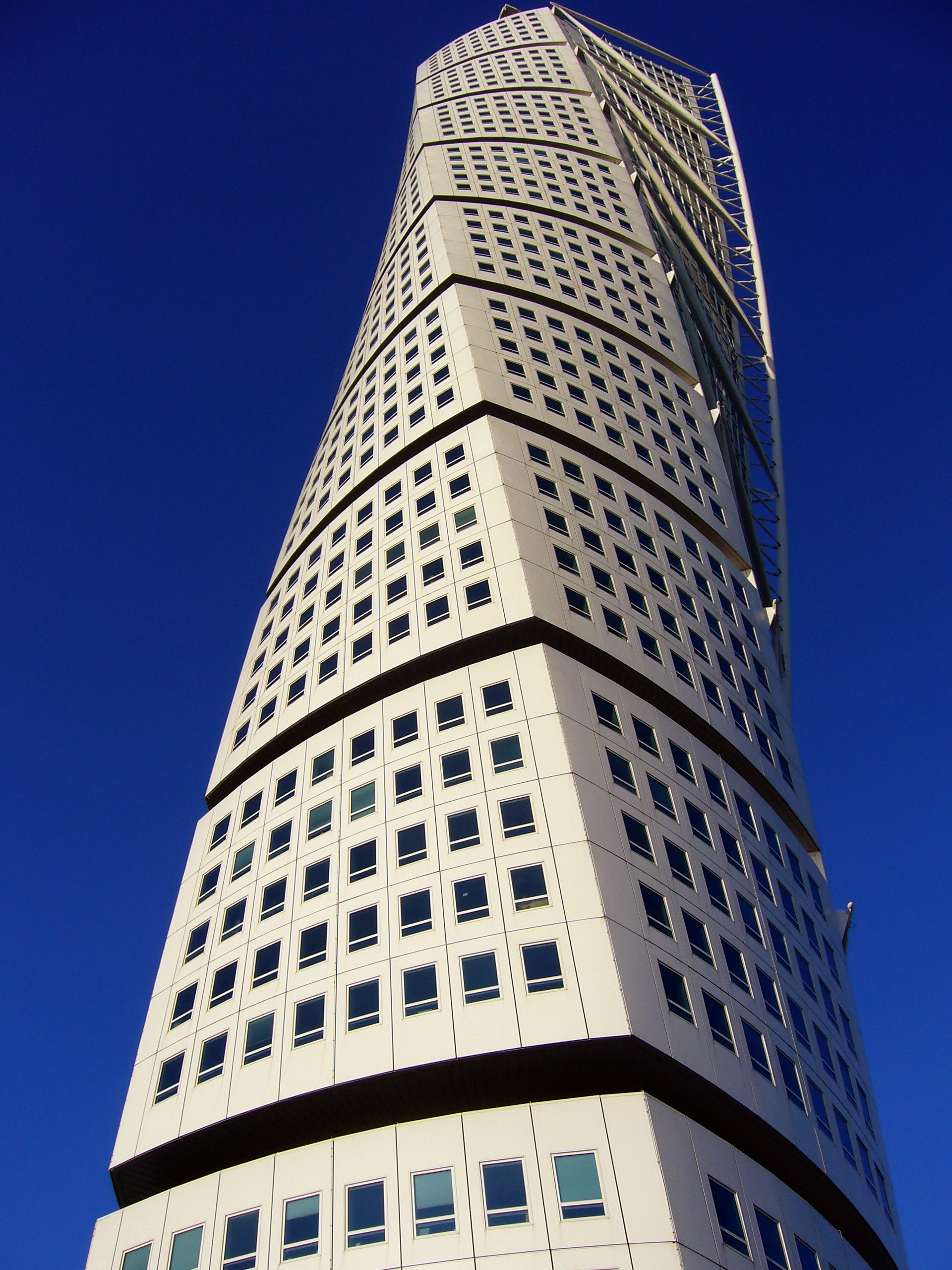
The Turning Torso in Malmö by Santiago Calatrava, 2005

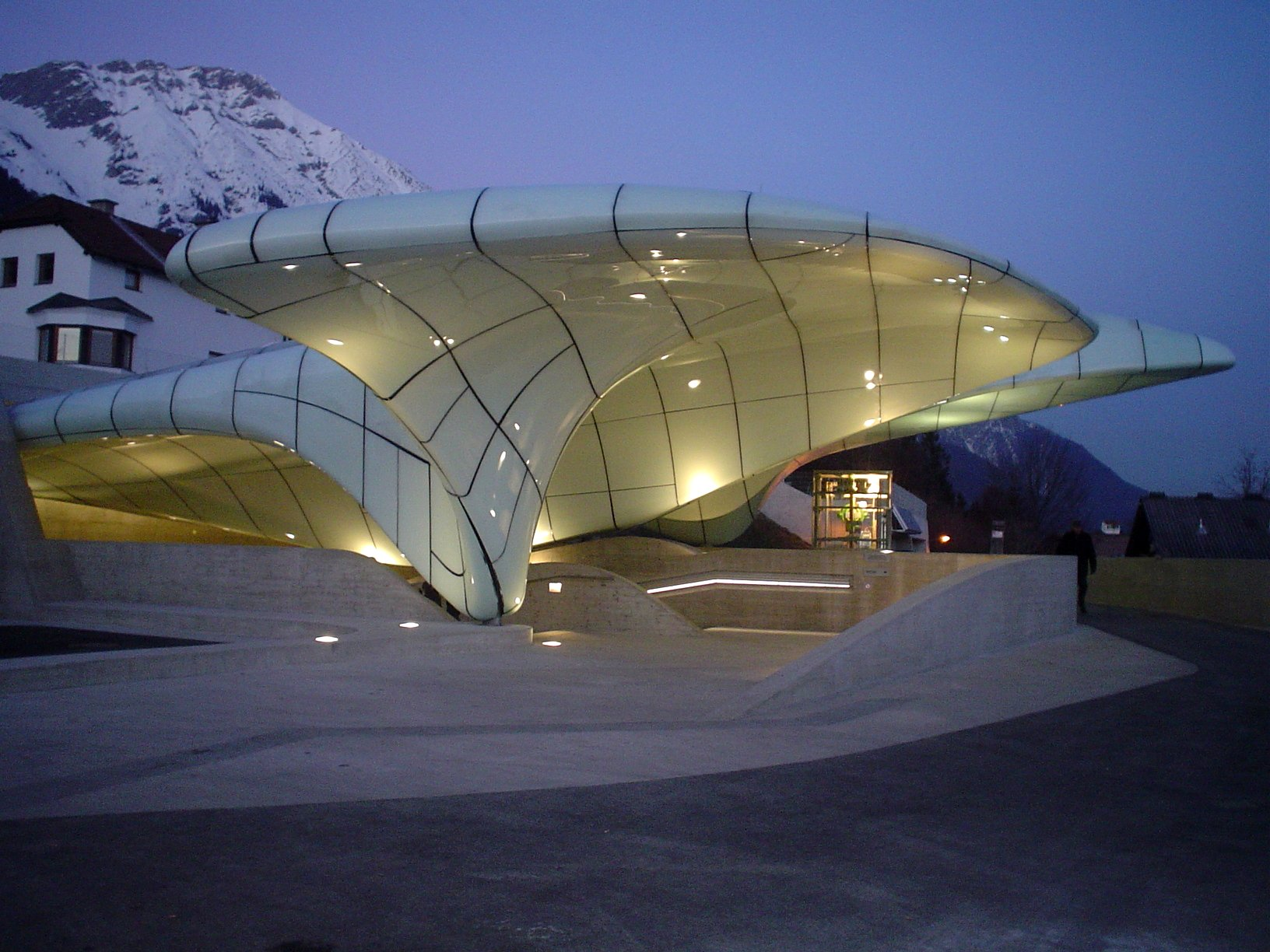
Hungerburgbahn top station in Innsbruck by Zaha Hadid, 2007

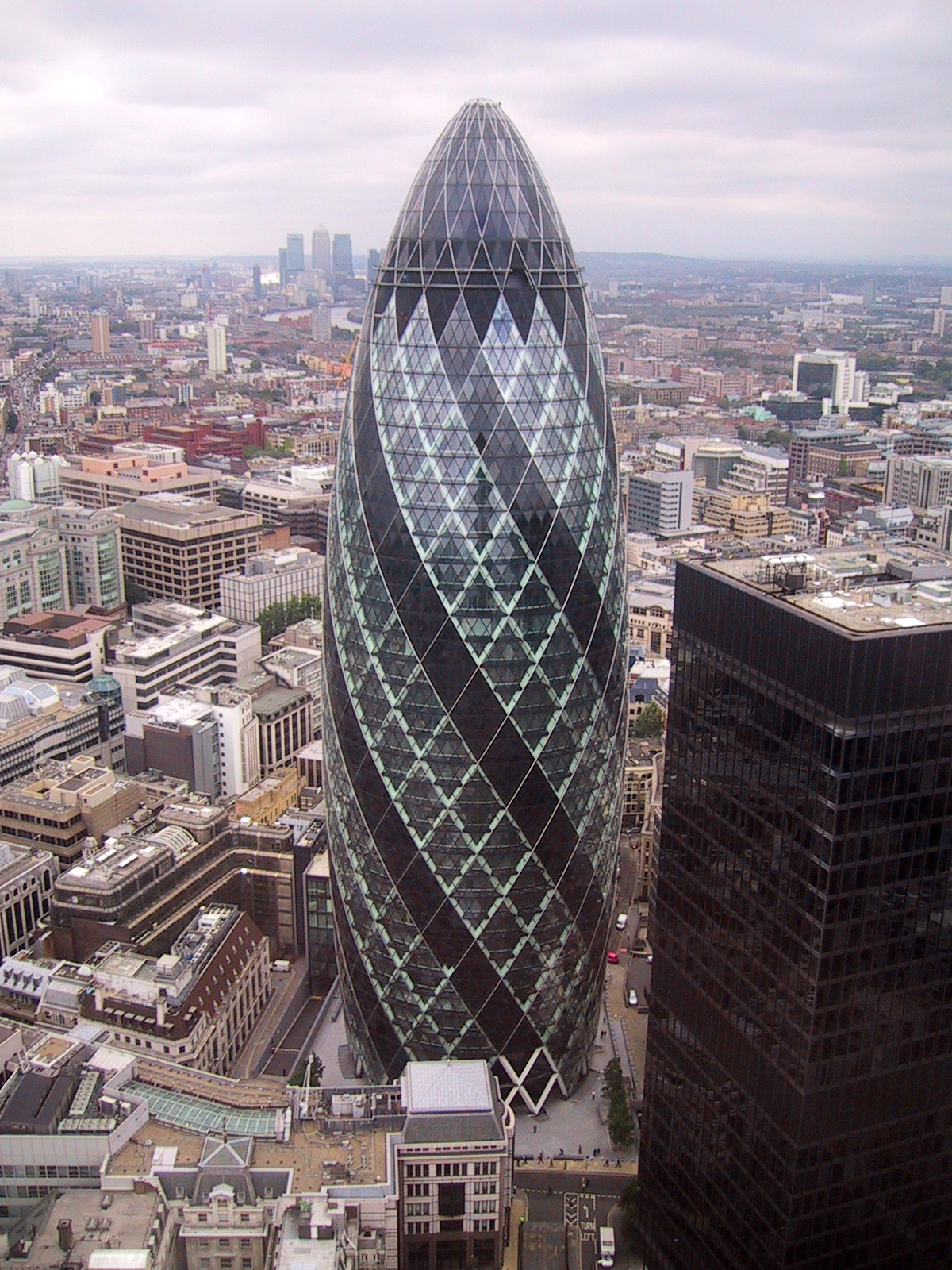
The Gherkin in London by Foster + Partners and Arup Group, 2007

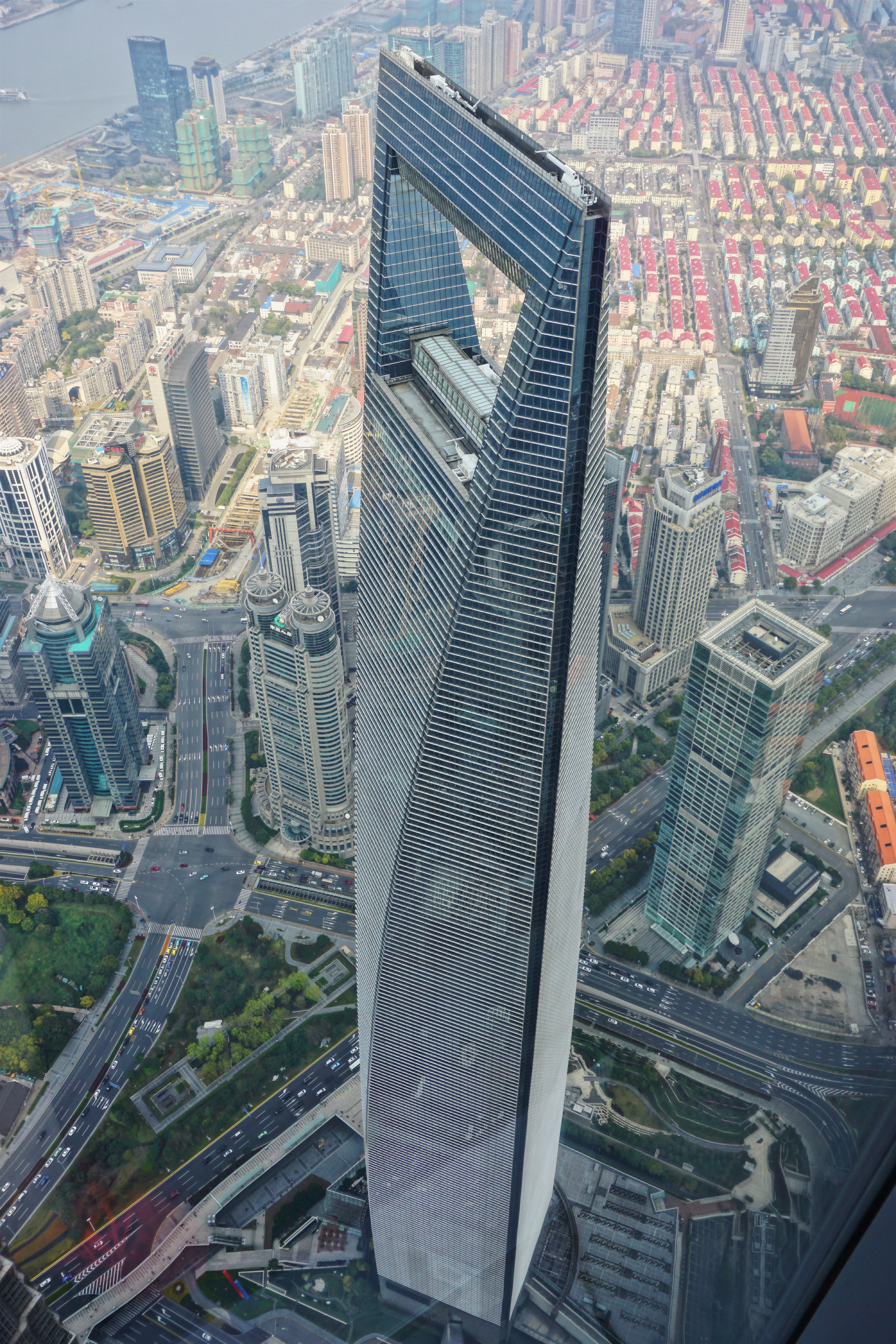
Shanghai World Financial Center by Kohn Pedersen Fox, 2008

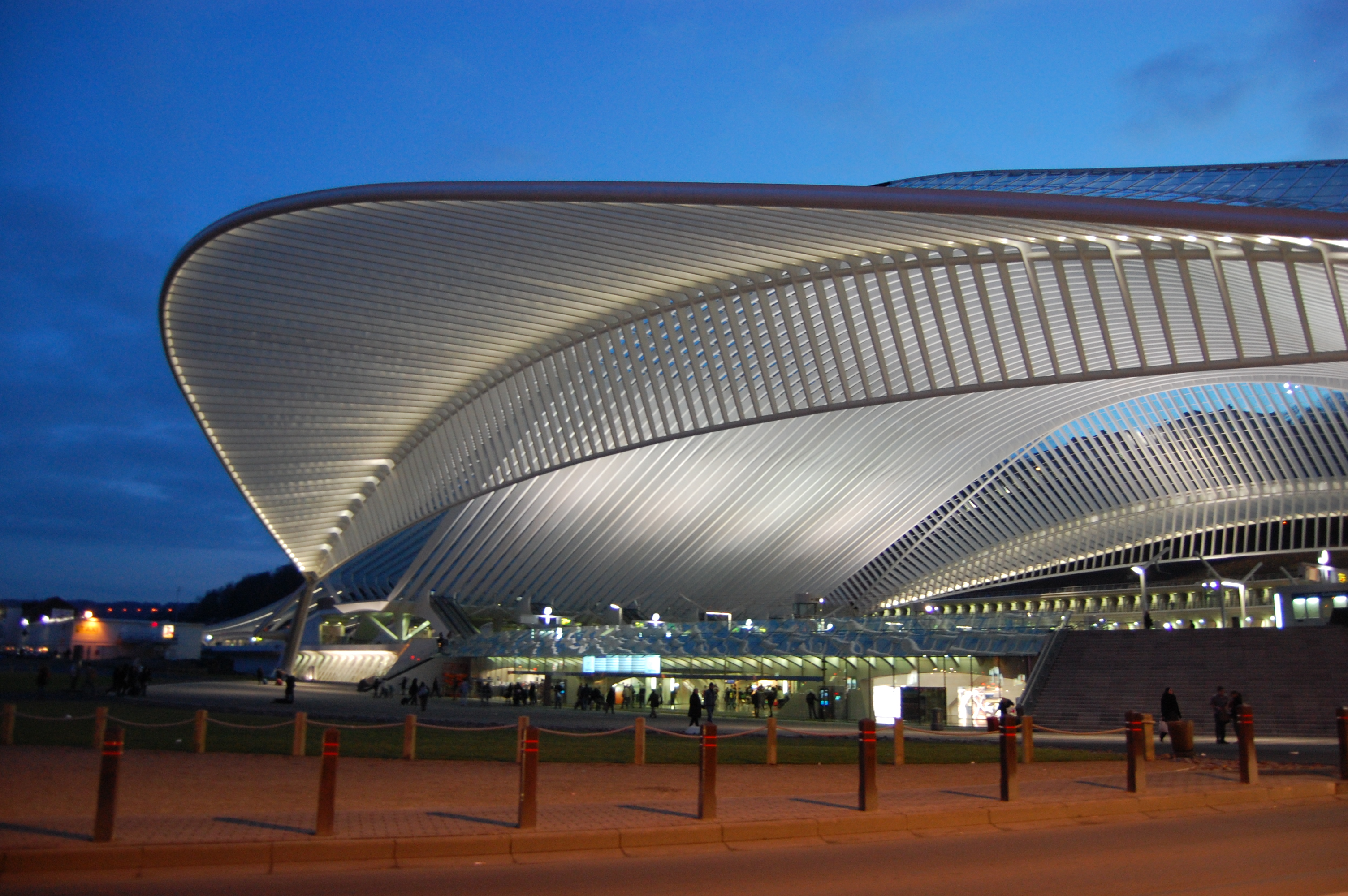
Liège-Guillemins railway station in Liège by Santiago Calatrava, 2009

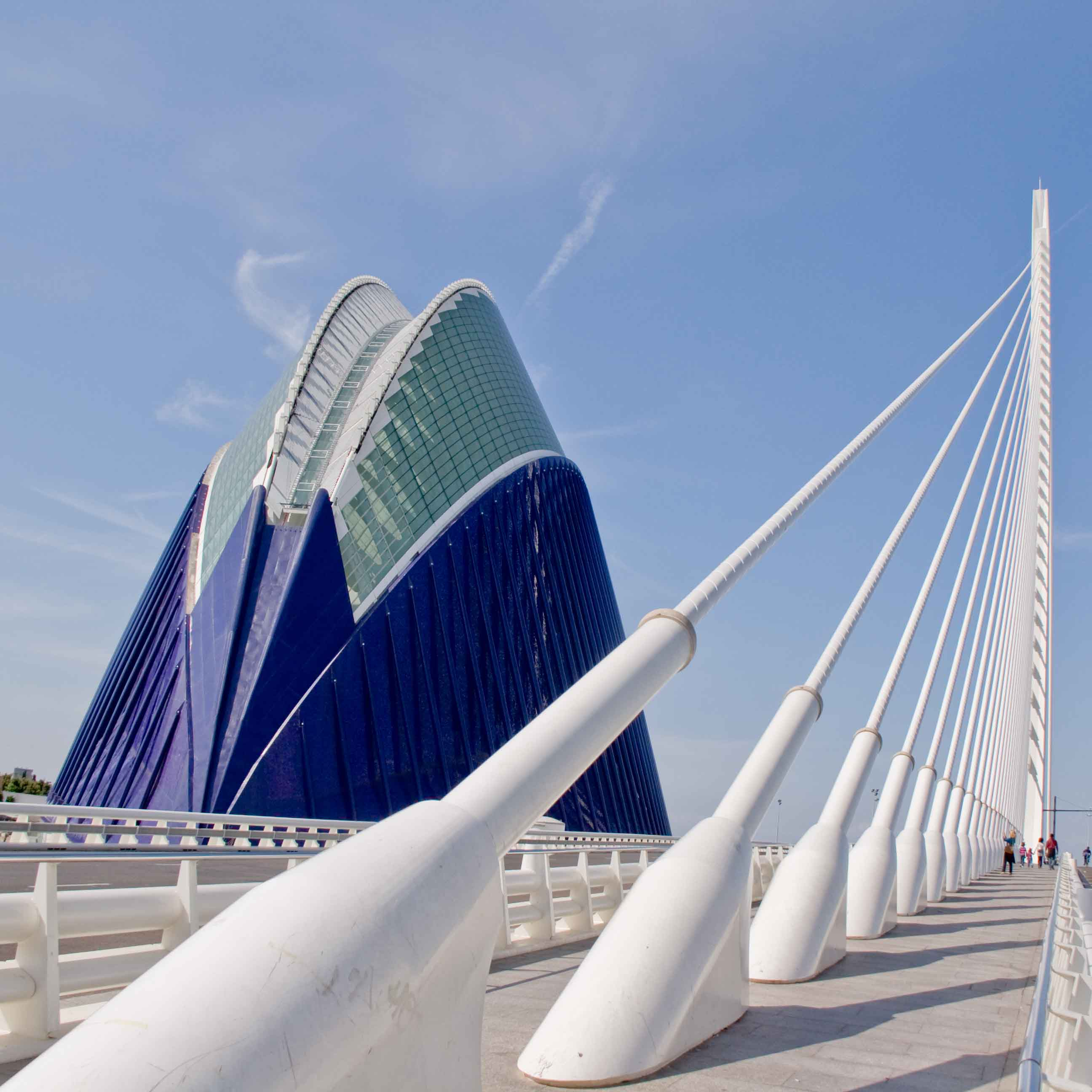
L'Àgora in the City of Arts and Sciences, Valencia by Santiago Calatrava, 2009

The Burj Khalifa in Dubai by Adrian Smith, 2010

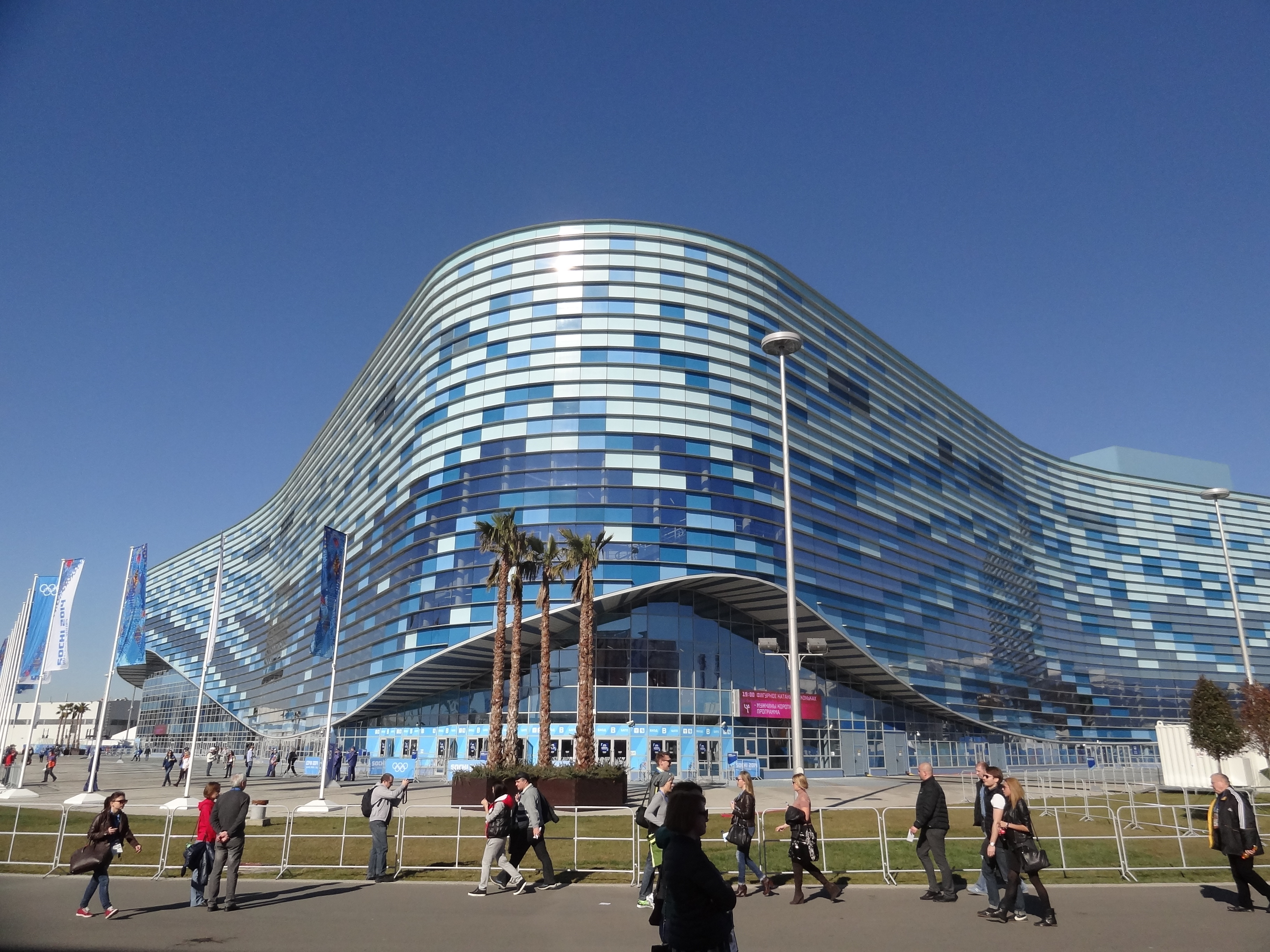
Iceberg Palace in Sochi by Andrey Bokov, 2012

Heydar Aliyev Center in Baku by Zaha Hadid, 2012

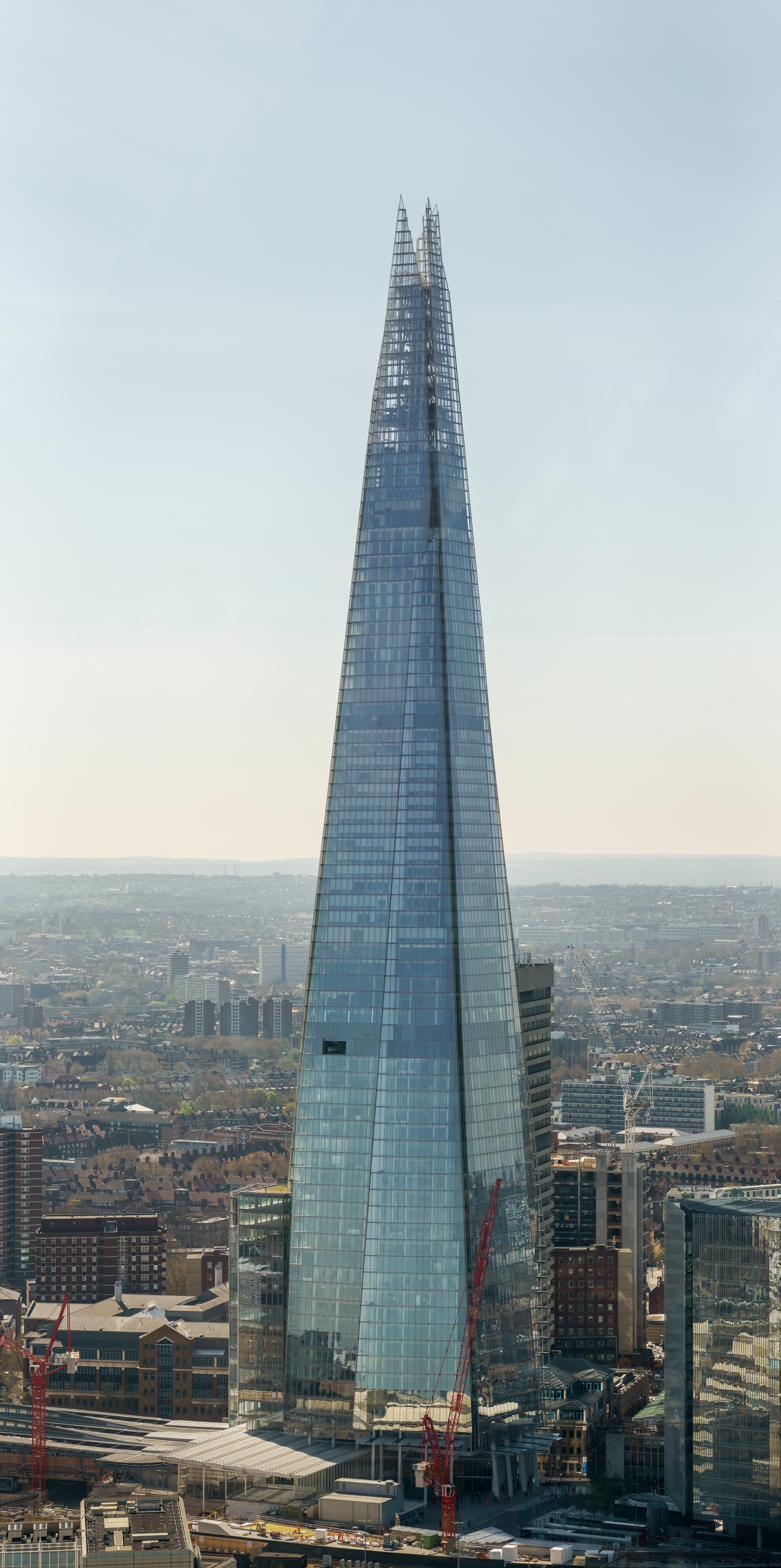
The Shard in London by Renzo Piano, 2012

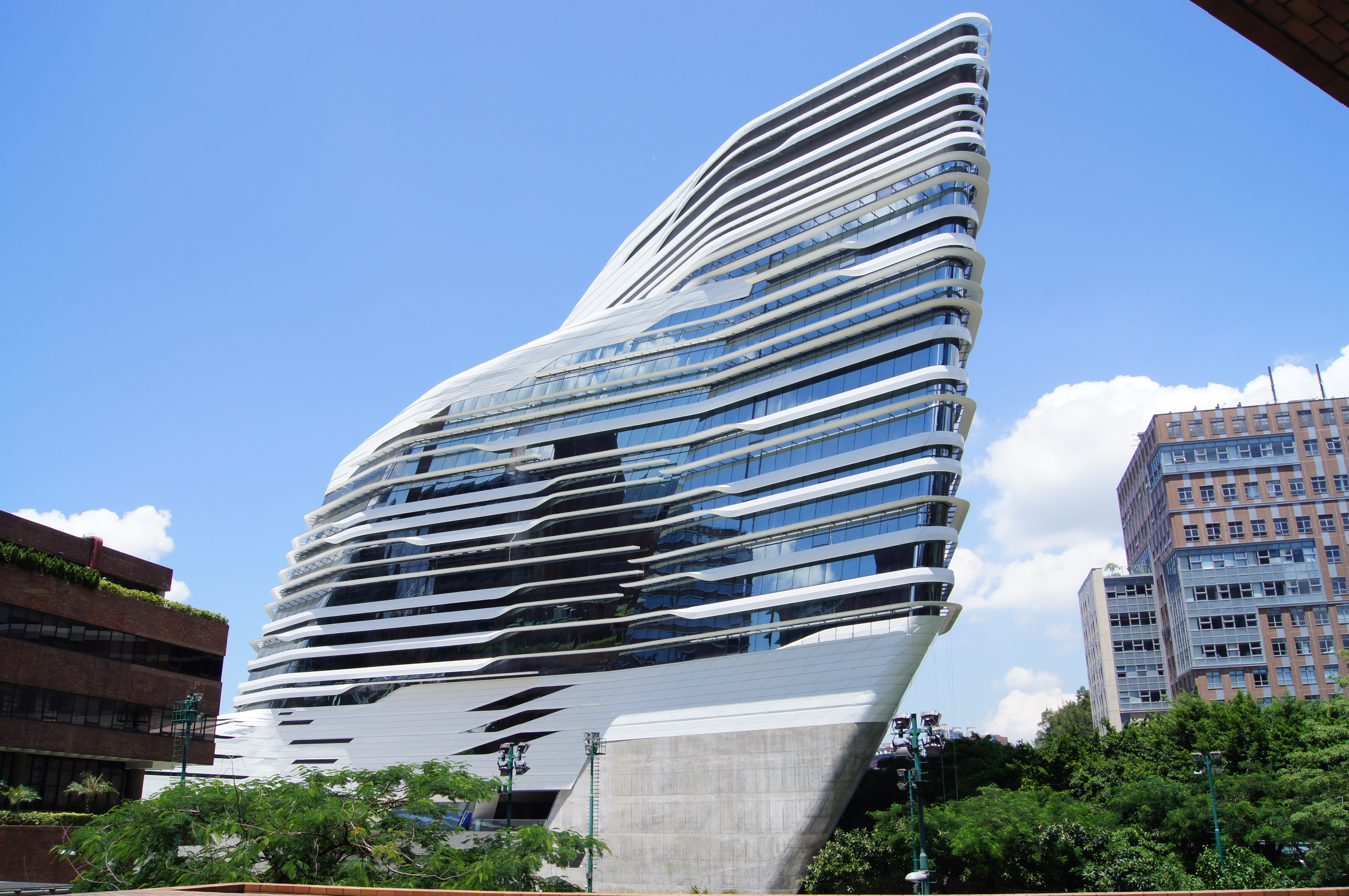
Jockey Club Innovation Tower in Hong Kong by Zaha Hadid, 2013

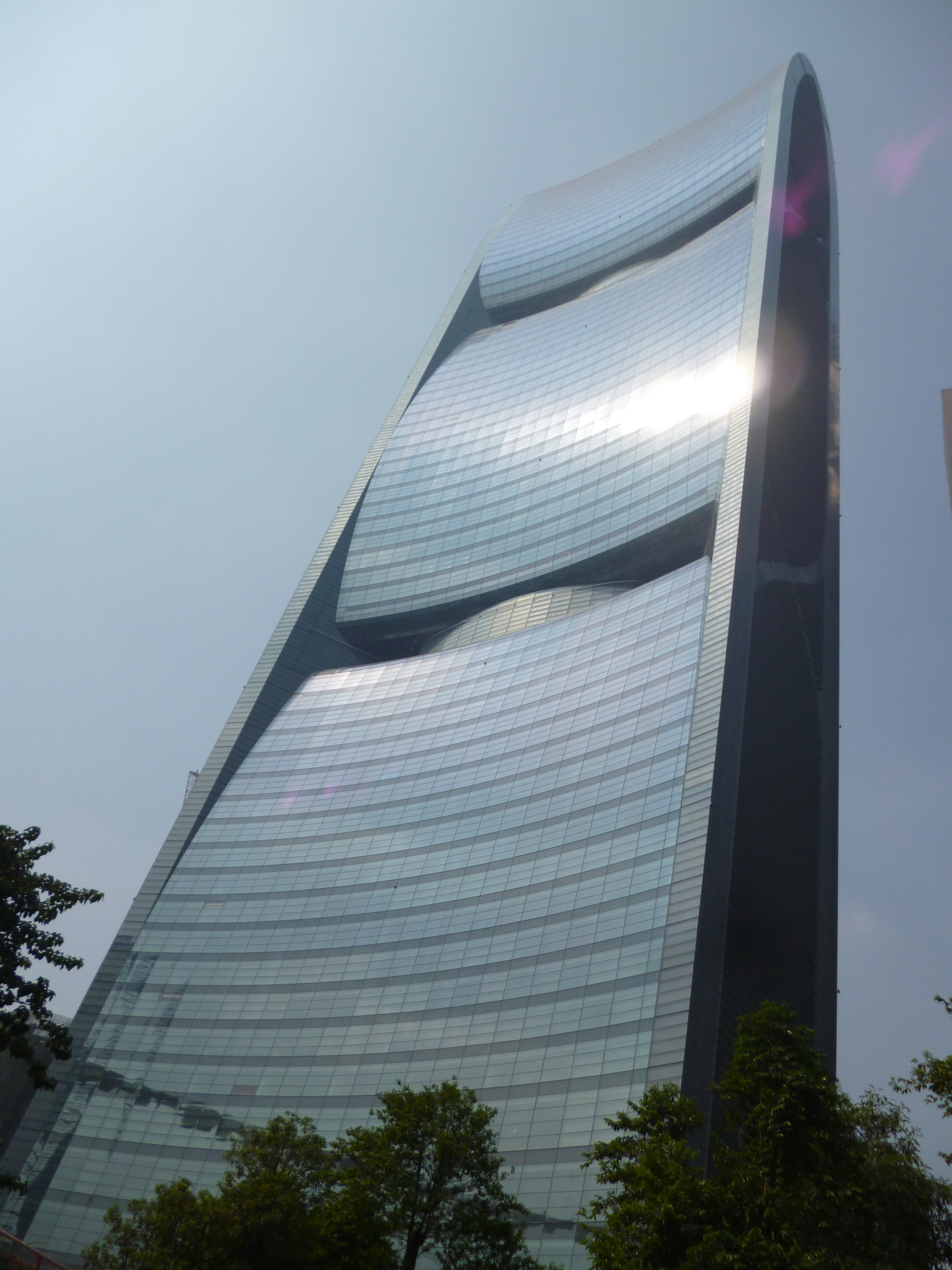
Pearl River Tower in Guangzhou by Skidmore, Owings & Merrill, 2013

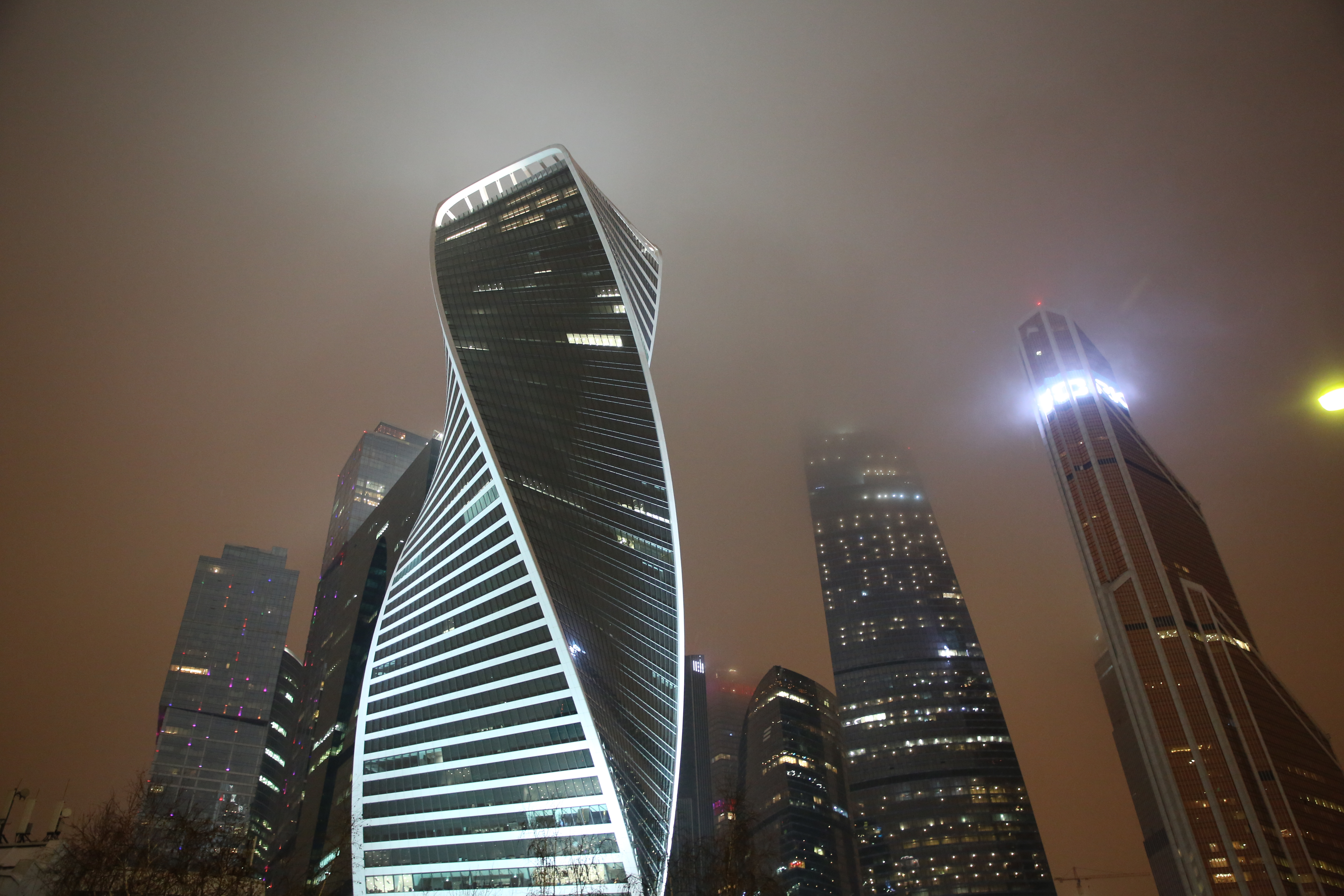
The Evolution Tower in Moscow by RMJM and Philipp Nikandrov, 2014

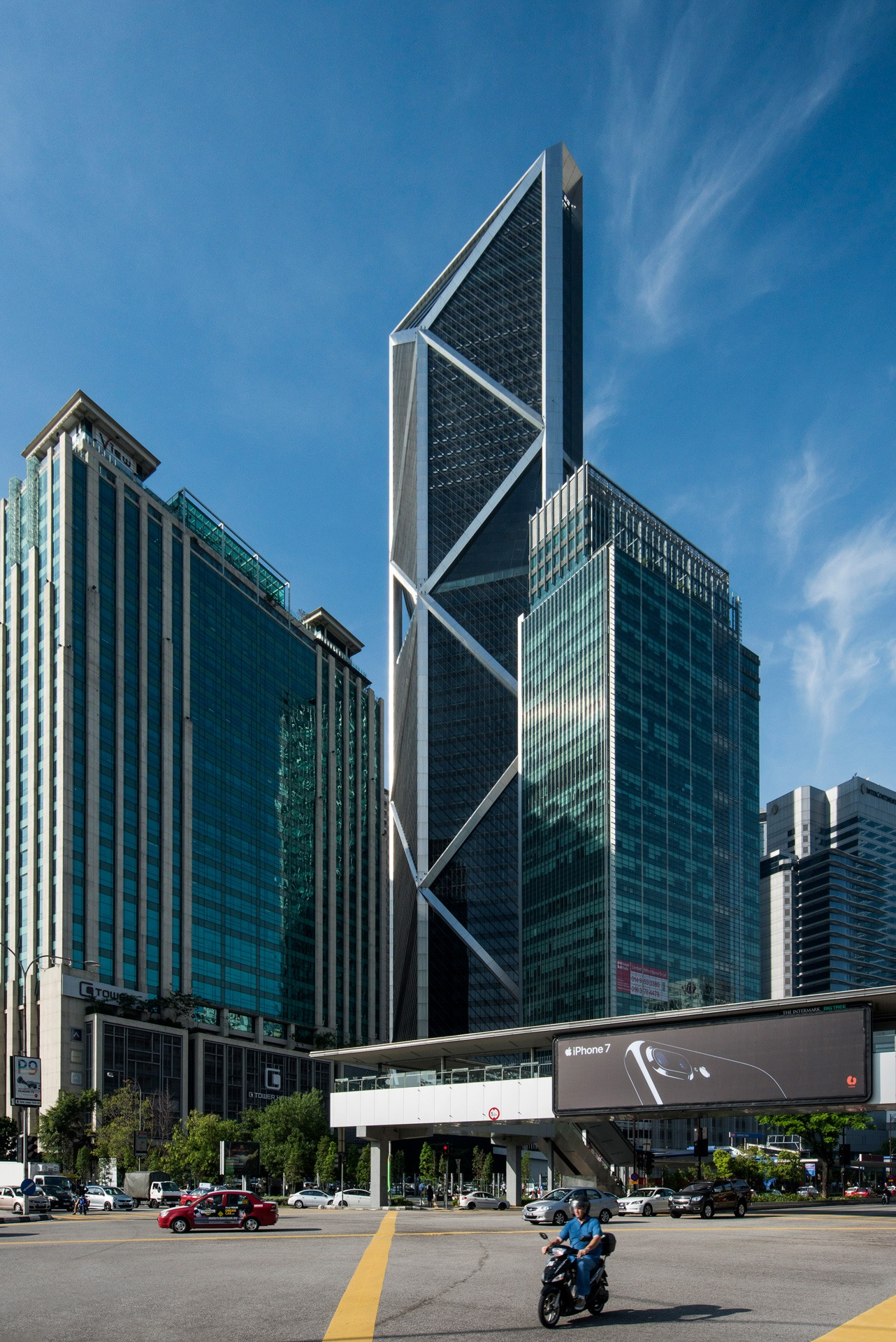
Ilham Tower in Kuala Lumpur by Foster + Partners, 2015

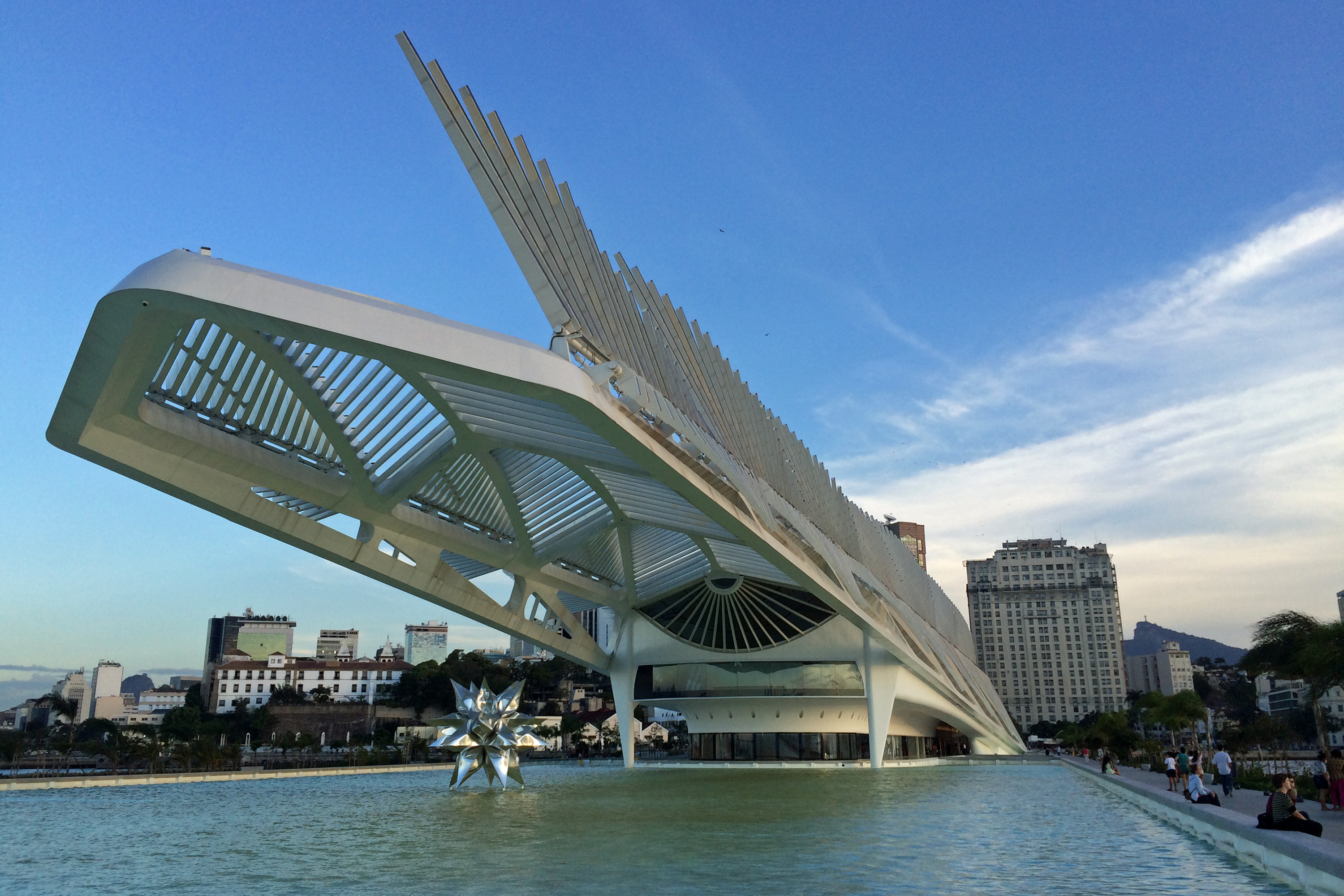
Museum of Tomorrow in Rio de Janeiro by Santiago Calatrava, 2015

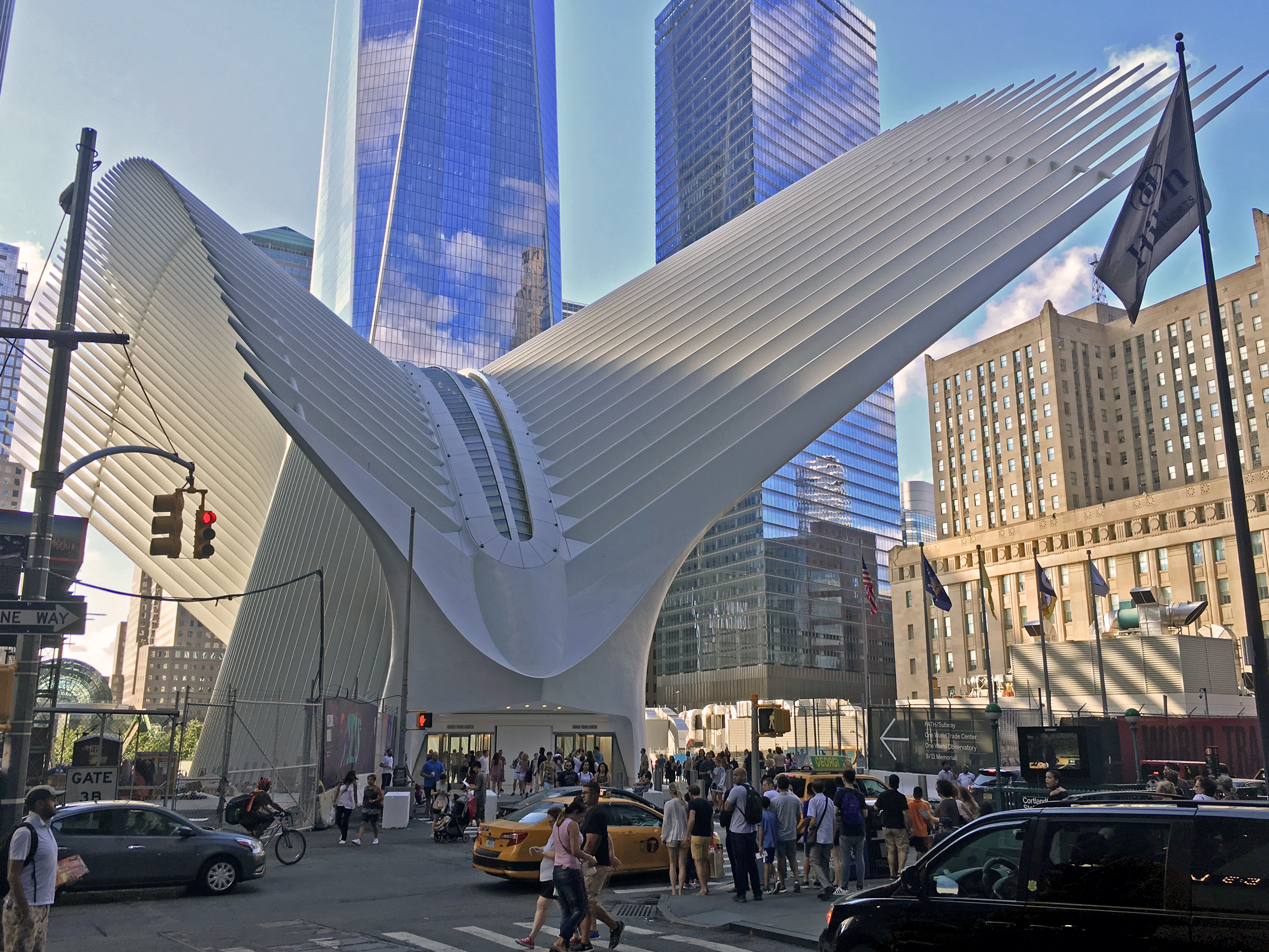
The World Trade Center Hub in New York City by Santiago Calatrava, 2016

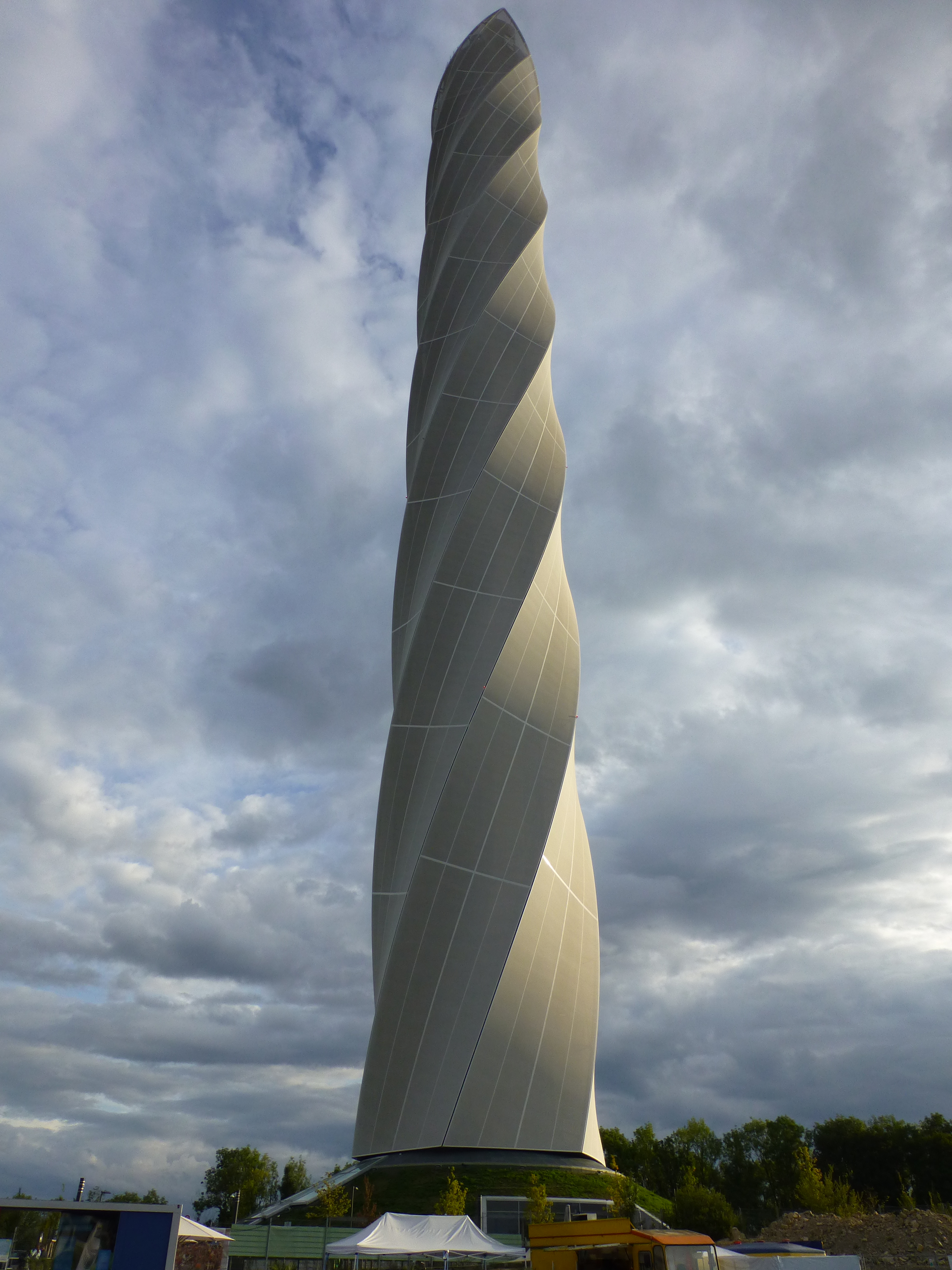
TK Elevator Test Tower in Rottweil by Werner Sobek, 2017

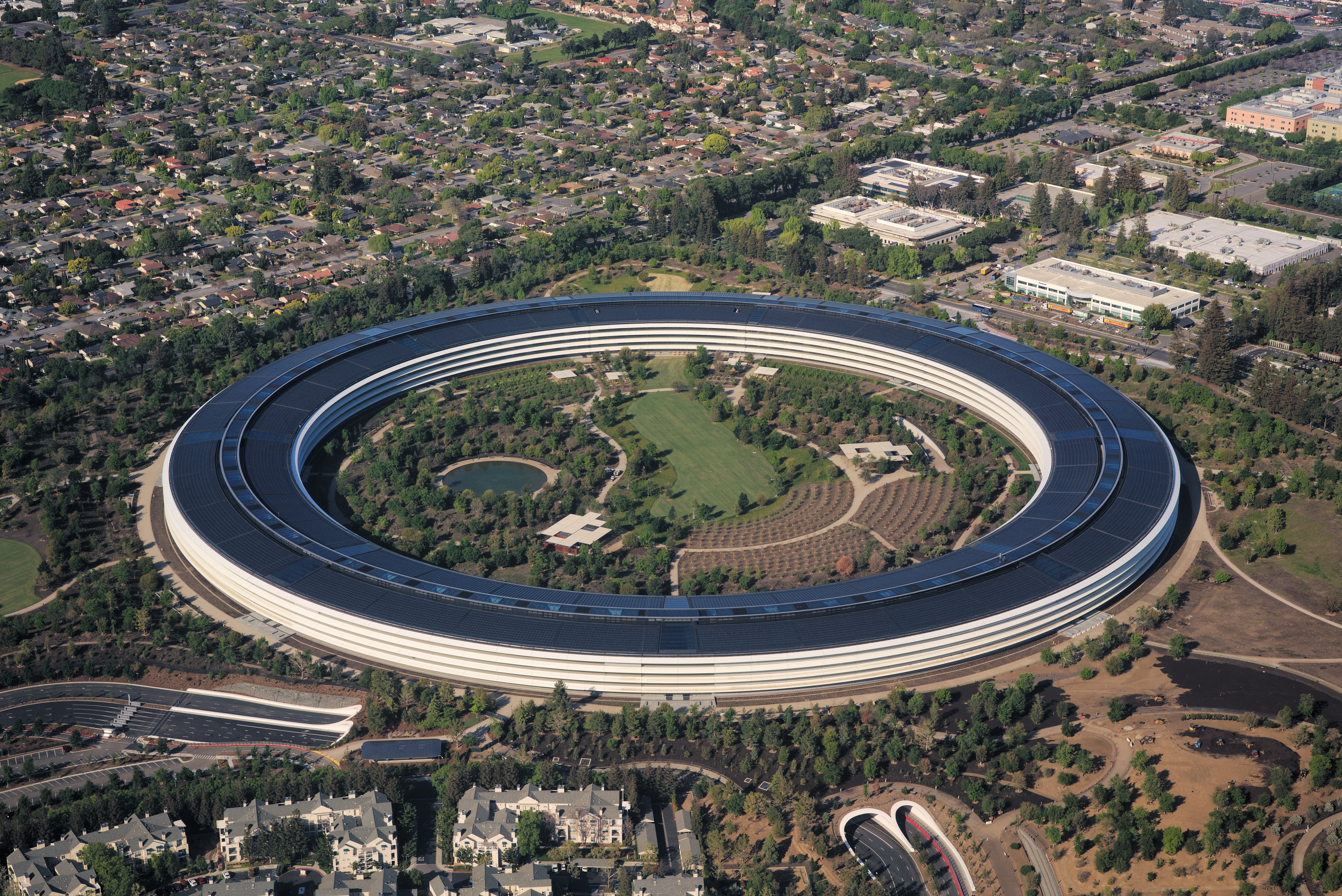
Aerial view of Apple Park in Cupertino by Norman Foster, 2017

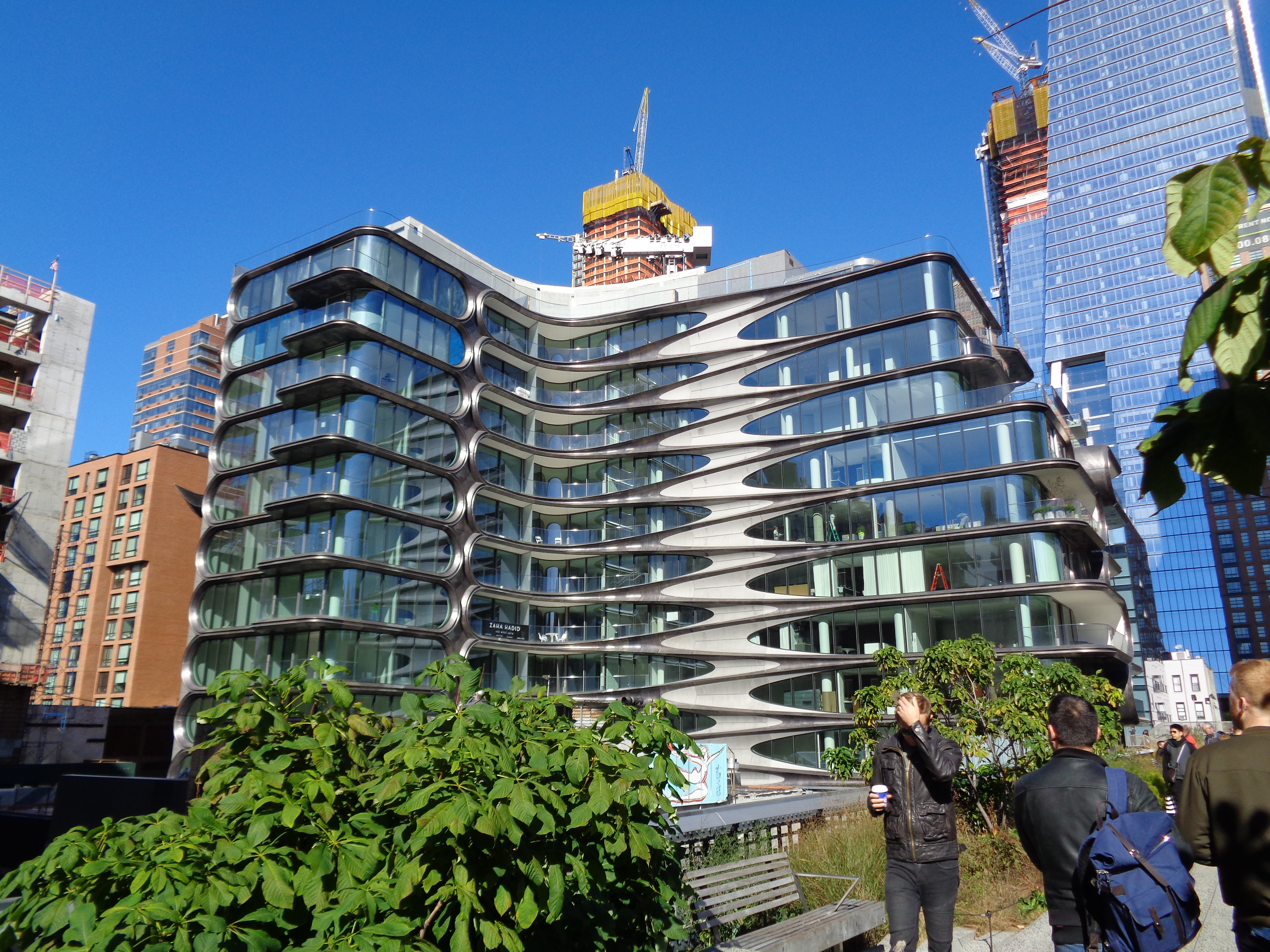
520 West 28th Street in New York City by Zaha Hadid, 2017

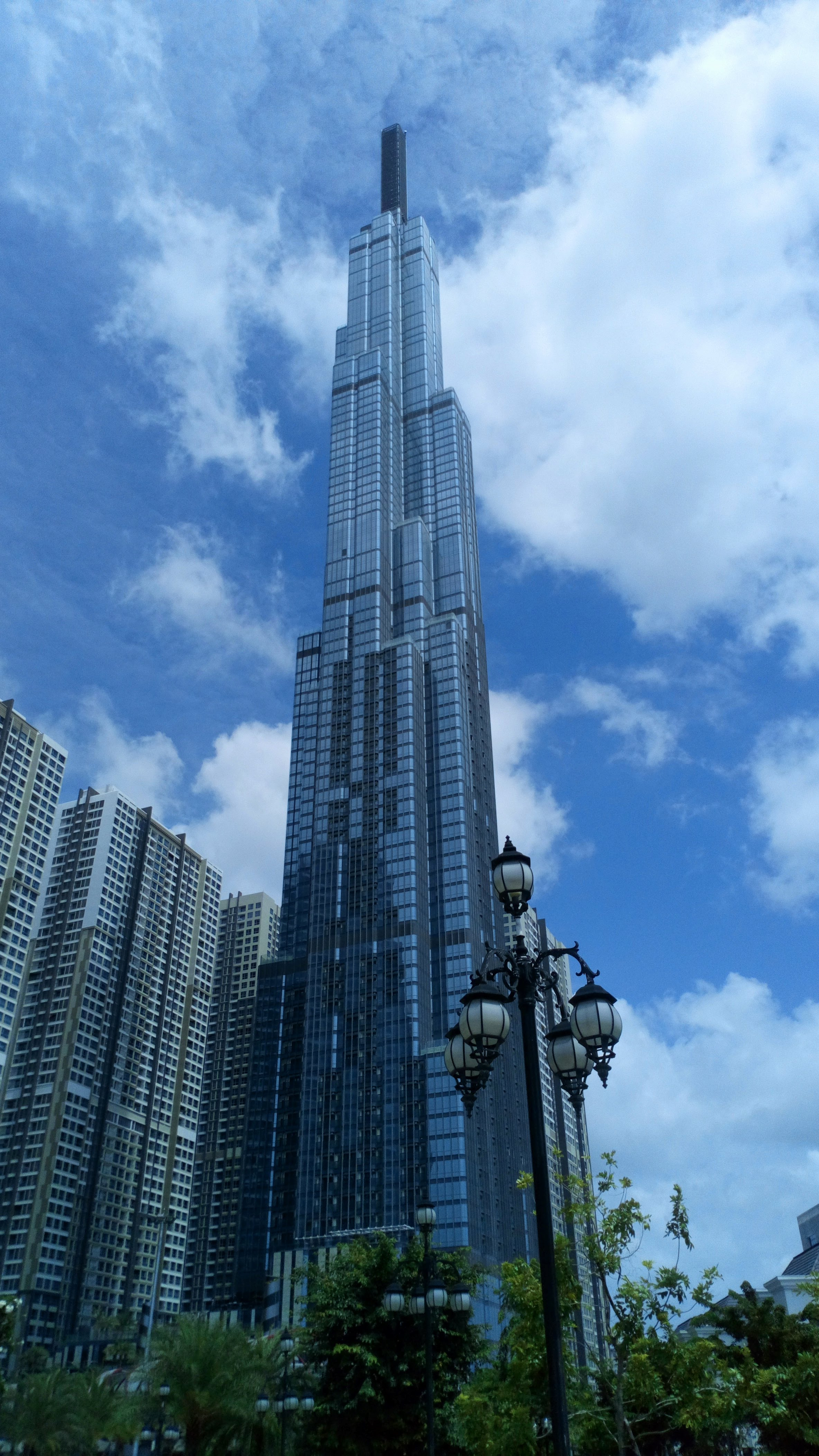
Landmark 81 in Ho Chi Minh City by Atkins, 2018

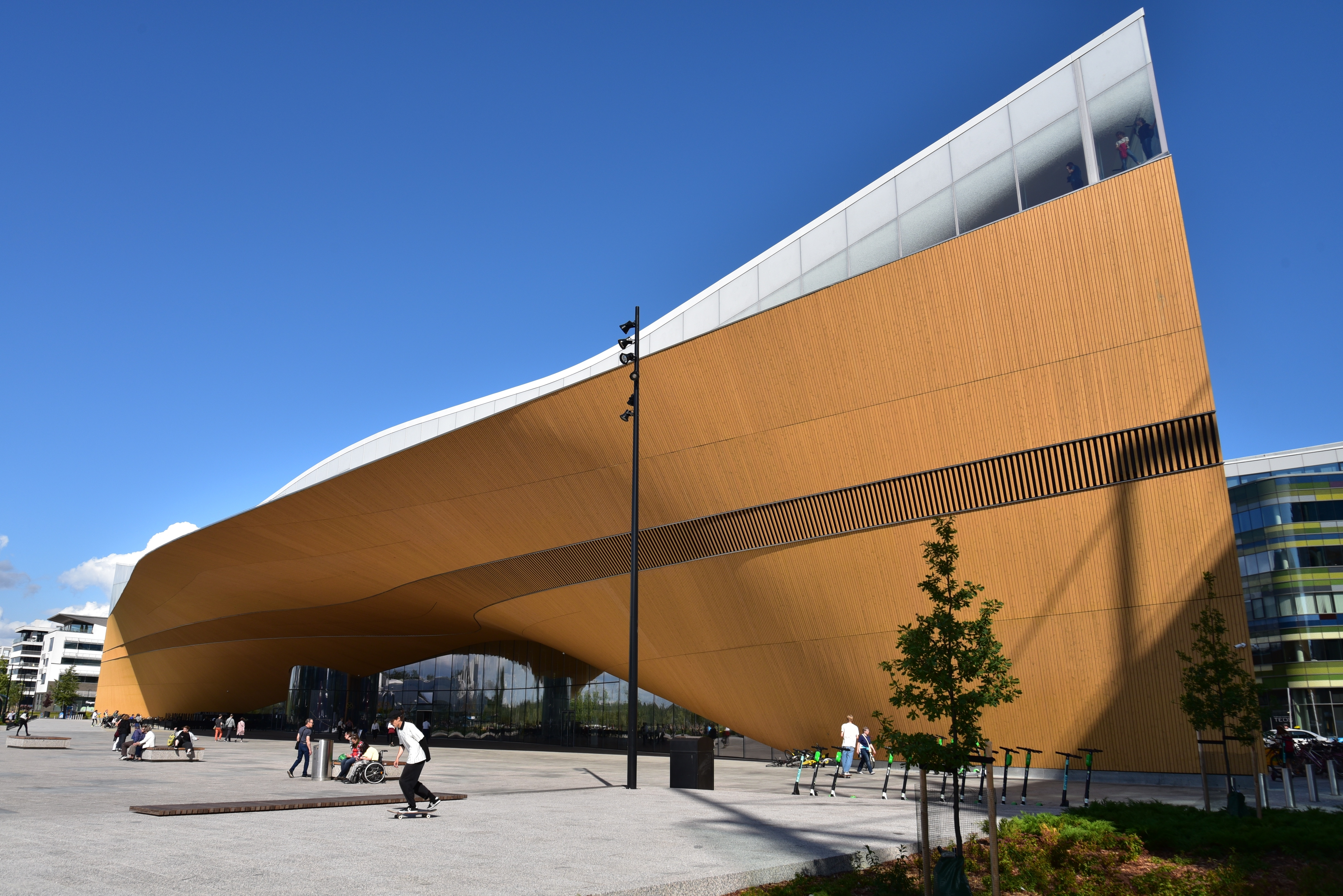
The Central Library Oodi in Helsinki by Arkkitehtitoimisto ALA, 2018

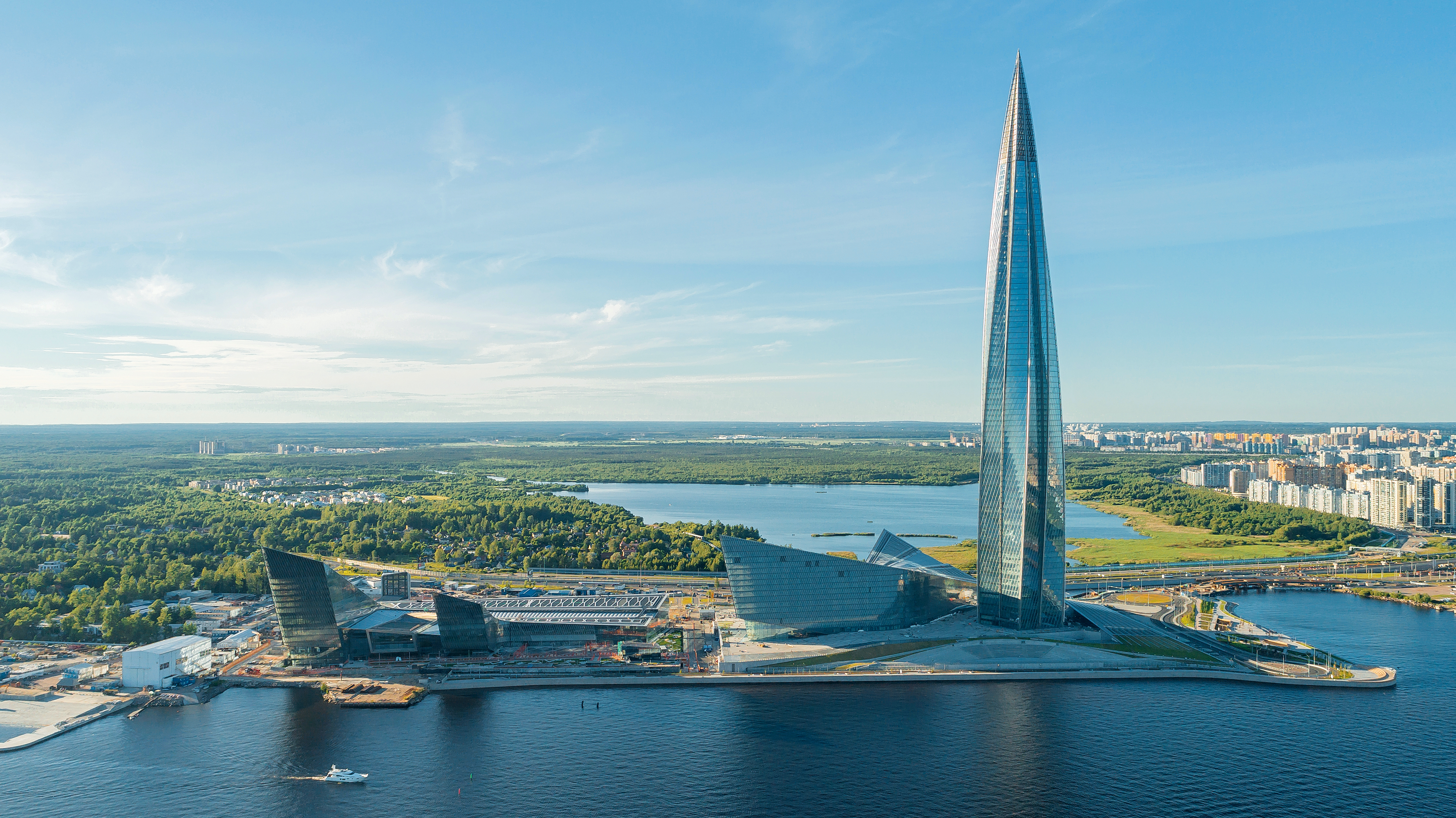
The Lakhta Center in Saint Petersburg by RMJM (until 2011), GORPROJECT, 2019

== See also ==
- Futurist architecture
- High-tech architecture
- Neomodern
