= Charis Tsevis =

Greek visual designer, illustrator and art director

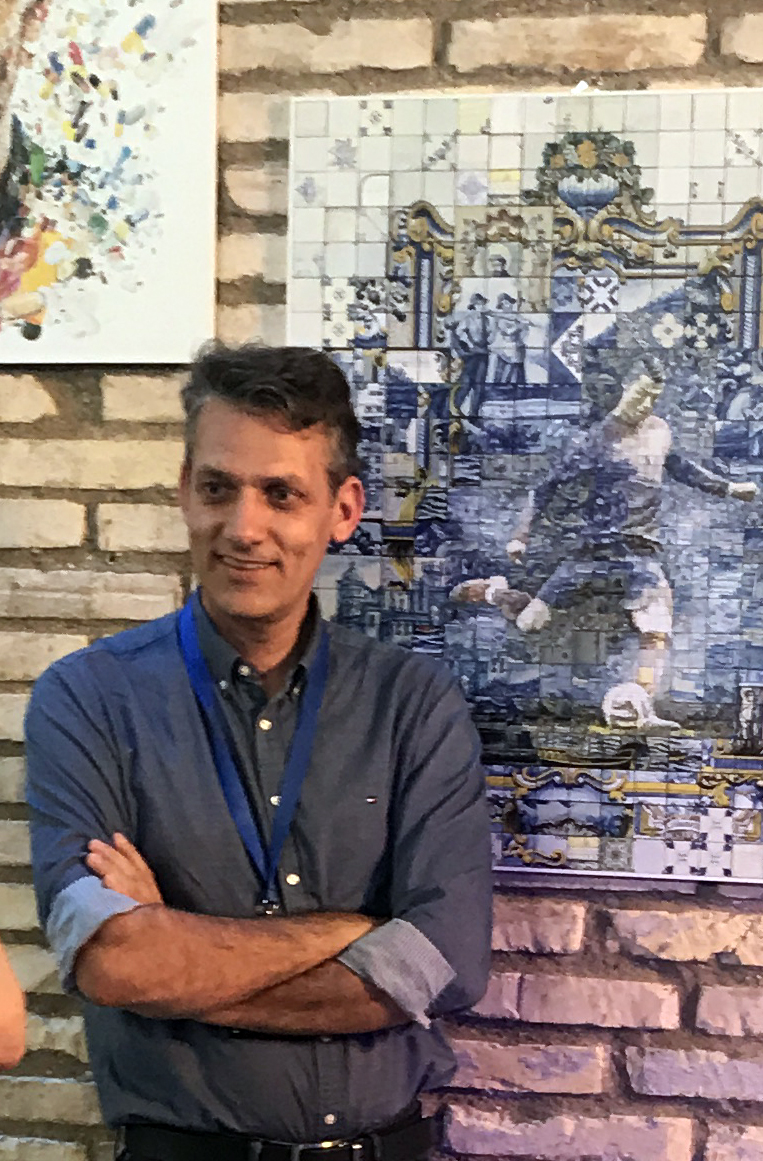
- Charis at Binario18 design festival in Rome 2018
- Born: May 8, 1967 (age 59); Athens, Greece
- Known for: Photomosaic, Digital illustration, Digital art, Computer illustration
- Style: Digital mosaics
- Movement: Neofuturism
- Website: tsevis.com

Charis Tsevis (Greek: Χαράλαμπος Τσέβης or Χάρης Τσέβης; Greek pronunciation: [xaris t͡sevis]; born 8 May 1967) is a Greek visual designer, illustrator and art director.

Charis Tsevis studied visual design and advertising in Athens, Greece and Milan, Italy and his is mainly known for his work in digital mosaics, high complexity illustrations and neo-futuristic compositions. He is collaborating with the major media and the multinational advertising agencies creating illustration and digital art for global campaigns, political and sports events. He is particularly known for his mosaic portraits for Steve Jobs, Barack Obama and for his artwork for the USA House in the Rio Olympics, the Delta Air Lines Sky Club SFO mosaic and the Yahoo coverage of the London Olympics.

== Early life and education ==
Born in Athens in 1967, Charis Tsevis has always been obsessed with visual arts. He was especially obsessed with magazines. He was creating his own magazines since the age of 5, that he was selling to his family. In the same age, he discovered his love for complexity. He often narrates in interviews that his myopia led him to pay special attention to complexity as he had to move his eyes very close to objects. Trying to see better he has experimented with big zoom outs using photographic equipment and he fell in love with the complex systems hidden in surfaces. He attended a Greek-German elementary school, a Greek-French high school and he has been accepted in the University of Athens majoring German Language and Literature. Parallel to his University studies Charis Tsevis frequented a Greek-German college of Graphic Design and Advertising in Athens called Deutsche Höhere Lehranstalt für Grafik und Werbung Athen. After receiving his Diploma from this college, accredited by the Akademie für das Graphische Gewerbe München, Tsevis flew to Milan when he frequented the Visual Design course and the Master in Visual Design course at the Scuola Politecnica di Design, a school with a long and strong relationship with Gestalt psychology. Charis Tsevis acknowledges that he has found in Gestalt the solid ground on which he could base his artwork.

== 1990s - 2000s: Graphic design, education and publications ==
Returning in Athens after Milan Charis Tsevis works initially for “Ta Nea Ton Grafikon Techno” (Graphic Art News) a monthly publication that had a big influence on the Greek design scene. He left the magazine in 1997 and found his own studio serving Greek clients especially books publishers and media houses. Charis Tsevis was also dedicating a good part of his life in education. He started teaching in Intergraphics College of Computer Graphics in Athens in 1995 and he presented seminars in the Panteion University of Athens for Gestalt psychology and design. In 1996 he has been accepted as a full-time professor at AKTO College, the biggest private art institute in Greece. At AKTO Charis Tsevis stayed for 18 years teaching Editorial design and typography. For 3 years he served as the vice head of the Graphic Design department. Parallel to his academic career Charis Tsevis became known in Greece for his frequent publication in the major design magazines of his country. He has written articles for DeltaD/+Design and Publish magazines in the design market and he held a monthly presence for 10 years in RAM magazine (best selling Greek computer publication of that time) where he was writing about computer history and cyberculture

== 2000s - Present: The mosaics ==
Tsevis is experimenting with digital mosaics since the early 90s. It was the influence of cyberculture with genres like ASCII Art, ANSI/Pixel Art and text art that influenced him as well as the teachings of Gestalt psychology and especially the influence of it on Op Art and Illusive art. Charis used the theories of Perspective Space by Nino Di Salvatore, founder of the Scuola Politecnica of Design, in mosaics. He had the innovative idea of introducing variable sizes in digital mosaics in order to give a more three-dimensional atmosphere in them. Instead of basing the mosaic in a rectangular grid with same sized tesserae his mosaics are using small images where the subject of the mosaic needs more detail and bigger images where no detail is needed. For instance, in a portrait, Charis Tsevis was the first using very small sizes for the characteristics like the eyes, the lips or the nose and bigger ones for the cheeks or the neck. Tsevis combined the work in digital mosaics with the studies in computer history and created a series of mosaic artworks showing some of the biggest names of the IT world. Especially his series of Steve Jobs mosaic portraits gave him world recognition after the use of his work from Fortune magazine in 2009. The mosaic portrait that has illustrated an article in that magazine have been republished in hundreds of world media and became a viral success the late 2000s and gave him world fame especially after Steve Jobs’ death in 2011. Charis Tsevis continued evolving his techniques and to do so he used influences from ethnic traditions and folklore. Today Charis Tsevis lives in Paphos, Cyprus and focuses more on fine art.

== Major projects ==
- Steve Jobs portrait series (2002–present)
- Obama 2008 - 2012 posters
- IKEA Long Live Diversity campaign
- Toyota NASCAR Racing 2009
- Yahoo! 2012 Games coverage
- Avatars for the new Flickr
- Gatorade Evolution campaign
- Delta Air Lines Sky Club SFO mosaic
- Head & Shoulders World Cup 2014 packagings
- Mosaic murals for the USA house at the Rio Olympics
- JOIN US IN GREECE... Up Greek Tourism is a private initiative aiming to promote Greece as a touristic destination.

== Talks and exhibitions ==
- TEDxAthens 2011
- TEDxUniversityofPiraeus2013
- ICTVC International Conference on Typography and Visual Communication 2004
- 3rd International Conference on Typography 2007
- binario18 three days of exhibitions, workshops, talks in Rome, Italy 2018.
- Offside Lisboa, um Festival de Cinema e Bola, Lisbon 2018
