= Nanjing International Youth Cultural Centre =

Supertall skyscraper in Nanjing, Jiangsu, China

Coordinates: 31.9916°N 118.7081°E

Nanjing International Youth Cultural Center
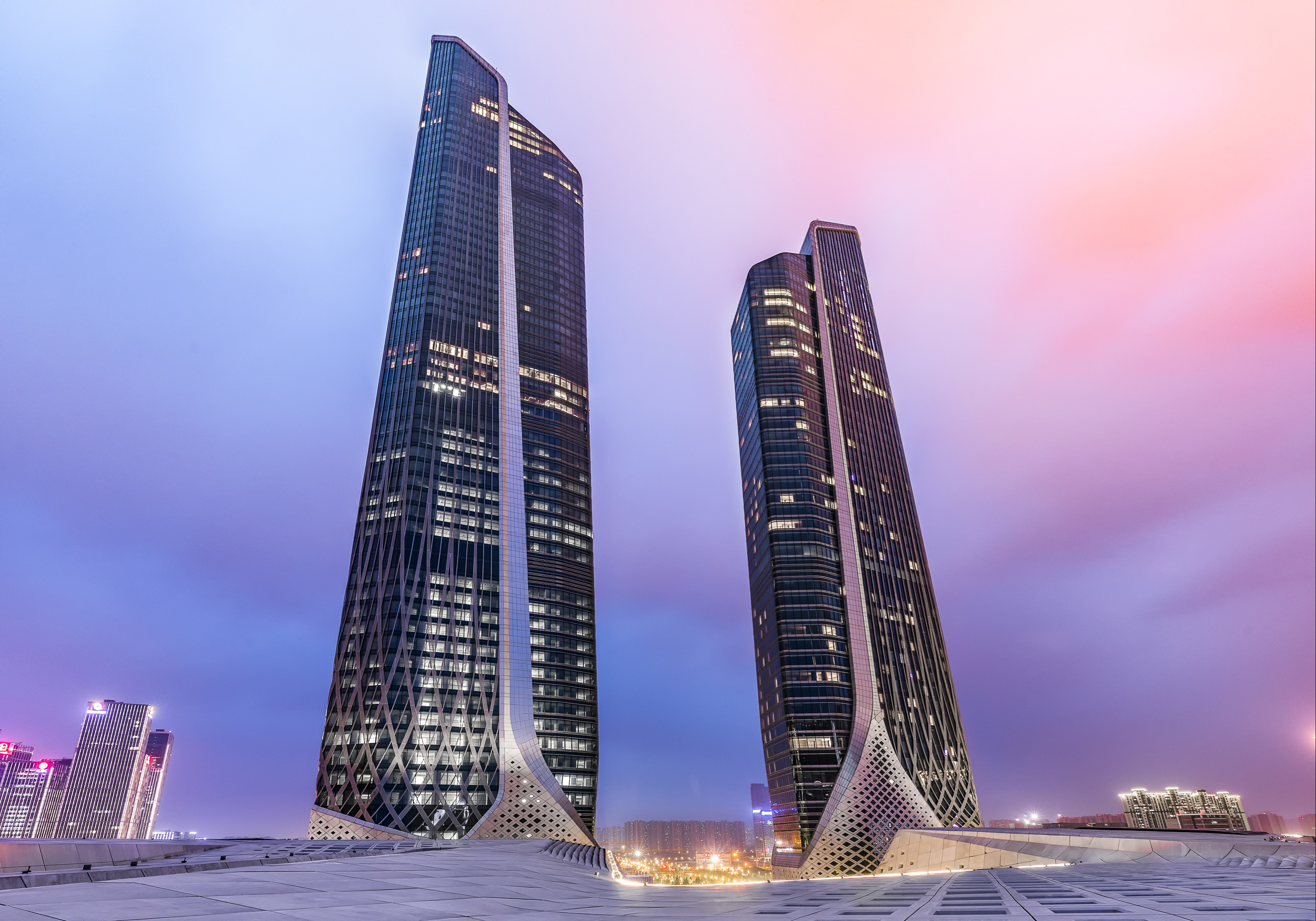
- Interactive map of the Nanjing International Youth Cultural Center area

General information
- Status: Completed
- Architectural style: Neo-futurism
- Location: Nanjing, China
- Construction started: August 26, 2012
- Completed: September 2, 2015
- Owner: Nexi New Town Planning Bureau

Height
- Architectural: 314.5 m (1,032 ft) (Tower 1); 255 m (837 ft) (Tower 2)
- Tip: 314.5 m (1,032 ft) (Tower 1); 255 m (837 ft) (Tower 2)

Technical details
- Floor count: 68 (Tower 1); 61 (Tower 2)

Design and construction
- Architect: Zaha Hadid
- Main contractor: China State Construction Engineering

Nanjing International Youth Cultural Center (Chinese: 南京国际青年文化中心) are two skyscrapers in Nanjing, Jiangsu, China designed by Zaha Hadid Architects. Tower 1 is 314.5 meters (1,032 ft) tall and Tower 2 is 255 meters (837 ft). Construction began in 2012 and ended in 2015.

== See also ==
- List of tallest buildings in China
