= Thomas Canto =

French contemporary artist (born 1979)

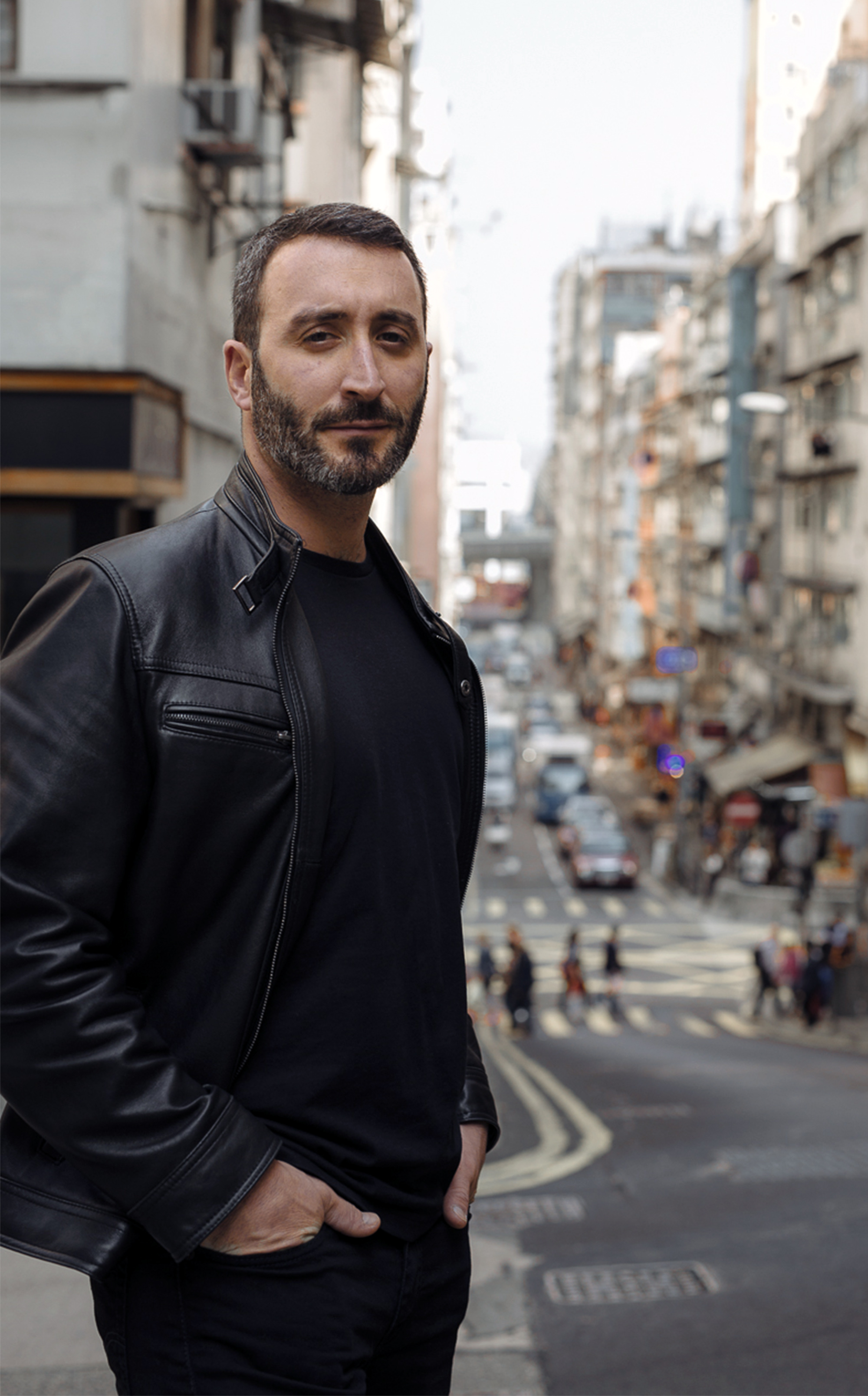
- Thomas Canto
- Born: 1979 (age 46–47); France
- Known for: Installation art, sculpture, painting
- Website: thomascanto.com

Thomas Canto (born 1979 in France) is a French contemporary artist. He lives and works between Lyon (France), Shanghai (China) and Dubai (United Arab Emirates). His work explores the intersections between urbanism, contemporary architecture, and the perception of space through a practice combining sculpture, painting, installation, and site-specific interventions.

== Biography ==
Thomas Canto was born in 1979 and spent his childhood in Nigeria, Paris and Cameroon before settling in Lyon (France). He was introduced to art at a very young age through a cultured family environment and frequent visits to museums. Early encounters with works by artists such as László Moholy-Nagy, Piet Mondrian and pioneers of Op Art deeply marked his sensibility.

Throughout his self-taught journey, Canto developed key relationships with artists from different generations, including Carlos Cruz-Diez and Xavier Veilhan, enriching his conceptual and visual approach. In conversation with Veilhan, the latter stated: "What you do is a form of distillation: you manage to extract a personal visual language that is both radical and legible." The experience of reproducing Moholy-Nagy’s Composition A.XX was a decisive moment in his artistic construction, both symbolically and formally. As he declares in his monograph: "This work by Moholy-Nagy accompanied me throughout my journey; it has been both a guide and a mirror."

Initially focused on painting, he discovered graffiti as a major turning point: this medium offered a change in scale and grounded him in a physical relationship with architecture. He describes this shift as essential: "Graffiti gave me space, the freedom of gesture, and an instinctive connection to the city, like an extension of the body into space." This practice led him to explore abandoned industrial sites, where his attention turned to structural forms and the architectural memory of place.

His immersion in urban environments such as Hong Kong, Tokyo, New York, and Dubai helped shape a visual language rooted in geometric abstraction and spatial perception. He has been influenced by artists such as Jesús Rafael Soto, Julio Le Parc, Victor Vasarely,Antony Gormley, Tony Cragg and Sarah Morris, as well as architects like Oscar Niemeyer, Le Corbusier, Tadao Ando, and Zaha Hadid.

In 2003, he participated in a residency at Flux Factory in New York, an alternative space fostering experimental creation.

In 2006, he founded the N2O gallery in Lyon, a pioneering space dedicated exclusively to the contemporary scene emerging from graffiti such as Sigi Von Koeding (DARE) and Hendrik Beikirch The gallery stood out for its commitment to showcasing unique approaches within that movement, at a time when few institutions paid attention to it. The N2O adventure ended in 2009, after contributing to the emergence of a new generation of artists.

Between 2006 and 2010, Thomas Canto frequently traveled to Tokyo, immersing himself in Japanese culture and urban environments. During these stays, he developed a deep sensitivity to the unique spatial balance of the city's landscape. Elements such as the dense network of overhead electrical wires—perceived as additional layers superimposed on the formal structure of the city—left a lasting impression and became a recurring motif in his artistic vocabulary. His exploration of Tokyo also brought him into contact with the architectural philosophies of Tadao Ando, Kenzo Tange, as well as the broader aesthetics of Brutalism and Metabolism, particularly embodied in structures like the Nakagin Capsule Tower.

In 2013, he was invited by curator Magda Danysz to join the ephemeral artist residency at Les Bains-Douches in Paris. This multidisciplinary project brought together street artists, installation and performance practitioners such as Futura, Vhils, Invader, C215, Jeanne Susplugas and Eva Jospin, in an emblematic venue. For this project, Canto created a site-specific piece in which he used anamorphic paintings and wires installed over the volume of a room. Connecting him with the Op Art collectors audience such as Jean Cherqui.

Following that collaboration, Magda Danysz invited him in 2014, to develop a site-specific installation in the historic Bund 18 building in Shanghai, strengthening his international presence.

In 2015, he participated in Main Street, a major exhibition at the Musée Mohammed VI d’Art Moderne et Contemporain in Rabat, Morocco. The same year, Thomas Canto participated in Artistes à la Une, a group exhibition organized in collaboration with Libération at the Palais de Tokyo in Paris

In 2016, he then created an installation in Wynwood(Miami) during Art Basel week, engaging with the district’s architectural fabric.That same year, He exhibited at the Centre Pompidou in Paris., a milestone event that emphasized his evolving dialogue with contemporary architecture and perception .It is also during that year that Thomas Canto, presented his first solo exhibition with Matthew Liu Fine arts in Shanghai named Gravitational transparencies

On the installation side, Canto participated in two editions of the Völklingen Urban Art Biennale (Germany) in 2015 and 2017, at the UNESCO World Heritage site Völklinger Hütte.

In 2018, he was an artist-in-residence at Residency Unlimited and moved to New York, where he furthered his research on architectural space.

In 2019, he joined the artist residency at the Swatch Art Peace Hotel in Shanghai, dedicated to international cultural exchange.

That same year, he participated in the group exhibition Prism Fantasy: New Ways to View Light at Paradise Art Space in Incheon (South Korea). Alongside internationally renowned artists such as Olafur Eliasson, Lee Bul, Jeppe Hein, Daniel Buren, Gabriel Dawe, Ryota Kuwakubo, Lee Yongbaek, Daniel Rozin, Ivan Navarro, and Bongchull Shin, Canto presented two installations exploring themes of infinity and the perception of light. The show brought together 25 installations by 11 artists, all questioning the role of light in contemporary art. One of the work presented by Thomas Canto is a room in which the physical and the digital are mixing.

Later that same year, he realized a large-scale installation in Shibuya, Tokyo, just steps from the iconic crosswalk, at the Sogo Seibu building. He created a piece engaging with the fast-paced urban fabric of one of the most dynamic neighborhoods in Japan.

A monograph titled Still Lifes of Spacetime was published in 2020.

In 2021 and 2022, two public art projects, in collaboration with Nicolas Couturieux, were created in the Normandy region of France, marking a continued interest in connecting his artistic research with specific territorial and architectural contexts.

Canto starts collaborating with Volery Gallery in Dubai and led by Rom Levy, in 2021.This partnership starts with a group show in which -Canto is showing along Roby Dwi Antono, Ana Barriga, Carlito, Aryoh Toh Djojo, and Richard Wathen.

In 2024, he participated in the inaugural group show at J7 Art Museum. "A posture of space" exhibition, in Shanghai. This group show featured seven artists, including Thomas Canto, Gao Ruyun, Huang Zhe, Lou Ye, LU SISI, Tess Dumon and Nathan Zhou. Each artist had a dedicated room to showcase their unique creative concepts and languages.

== Artistic approach ==
Thomas Canto’s work centers around the contemporary city: its structures, materials, and visual resonances. He uses industrial materials such as steel, glass, mirrors, MDF, Alubond or nylon thread to create installations that question perception and movement.

His works establish a tension between geometric abstraction and architecture, producing immersive environments that invite the viewer to move physically. His recurring use of transparency, reflections, and volume positions his work at the intersection of kinetic and conceptual art.

Through a rigorous visual vocabulary, his pieces aim to make the invisible visible—to materialize flows, tensions, and spatial dynamics inherent in the contemporary world. They evoke both urban chaos and the underlying harmony of architectural structures.

Canto articulates line as the foundation of his visual language, both as a construction tool and a rhythmic vector. He describes his installations as “sensitive architectures”: "I work like an architect without a building, but with the mental structure it requires." (Still Lifes of Spacetime, 2020)

His approach reflects a constant dialogue between surface and depth, between the visible and the perceptible, questioning the viewer’s place and how space can be lived, traversed, and absorbed.

The solo show Architectonic Harmonies received critical attention. According to critic Joana P. Neves, his exhibition in Shanghai (2023) "extends a constructivist tradition while confronting it with the contemporary temporalities of image and space."

== Selected solo exhibitions ==
- 2006: Opening Show, Galerie N2O, Lyon (France)
- 2007: B Side, Galerie N2O, Lyon (France)
- 2011: An Other Gravity, ZMART Gallery, Cluj (Romania)
- 2012: Gravité B, Galerie Australe, La Réunion (France)
- 2014: Transparent Landscapes, Atelier des Bains, Geneva (Switzerland)
- 2015: Still Lifes of Spacetime, Wunderkammern Gallery, Rome (Italy)
- 2016: Gravitational Transparencies, Matthew Liu Fine Arts, Shanghai (China)
- 2016: Suspended Landscape, Art Central (Projects section), Hong Kong
- 2017: Illusory Perspectives, Centre Pompidou, Paris (France)
- 2017: Structuring Shadows, RX Gallery, Paris (France)
- 2018: Temporal Geometries, Bermel Von Luxburg Gallery, Berlin (Germany)
- 2019: Chiasma, Matthew Liu Fine Arts, Shanghai (China)
- 2019: Structural Reverberations, Sogo Seibu, Tokyo (Japan)
- 2022: Etherealities, Volery Gallery, Dubai (UAE)
- 2023: Architectonic harmonies, Matthew Liu Fine Arts, Shanghai (China)

== Selected group exhibitions and art fairs ==
- 2006: Sculptures, Lyon Dance Biennale (France)
- 2007: Short film, Fête des Lumières, Lyon (France)
- 2008: Mural, Keith Haring retrospective, MAC Lyon (France)
- 2011: Group exhibition, Clément Foundation, Martinique (France)
- 2011: Performance, French Cultural Center, San Salvador (El Salvador)
- 2012: Les Bains-Douches residency, Paris (France)
- 2012: Screening of All Senses short film, Palais de Tokyo, Paris (France)
- 2013: Installation, Jean Cherqui Collection, Paris (France)
- 2014 : Look Through, Bund 18 Shanghai (China)
- 2014: Nuit Blanche, Danysz Gallery project, Paris (France)
- 2014: Outdoor Urban Art Festival, Rome (Italy)
- 2015 : Summer group show, Matthew Liu fine arts, Shanghai (China)
- 2015: Artistes à la Une, Palais de Tokyo, Paris (France)
- 2015: Main Street, Mohammed VI Museum of Modern and Contemporary Art, Rabat (Morocco)
- 2015: Urban Art Biennale, Völklingen (Germany)
- 2015: Installation, K11 Foundation, Wuhan (China)
- 2018: Objet Impossible, Duo show with Rero, Hangar 107, Rouen (France)
- 2018: Luxembourg Art Week 2018
- 2019: Prism Fantasy, Paradise Art Space, Incheon (South Korea)
- 2020: Beijing Contemporary, Beijing
- 2020: Group show, Matthew Liu fine arts, SHnaghai (China)
- 2021: American Psycho, Volery Gallery, Dubai (UAE)
- 2021: PhotoFair Shanghai
- 2022 : KIAF, Seoul
- 2023 : DnA, Matthew Liu fine arts, Shenzhen (China)
- 2023 : West Bund art and design, Matthew Liu fine arts, Shanghai (China)
- 2023: ART021 Shanghai Contemporary Art Fair
- 2023: West Bund Art & Design, Shanghai
- 2024 : J7 Art museum, Shanghai (China)
- Art Paris, Paris

== Public and site-specific installations ==
Celestial blasts and Rythmic vertigos , Völklingen (Germany), 2015 & 2017

Extended horizon, Miami (USA), 2016

Concrete Expansion, Rouen (France), 2022

Levitating Structured Inertia, Paradise City, Incheon (South Korea), 2019

Exponential Urban symphonies, (video) Paradise City, Incheon (South Korea), 2019

Gravitational inertia infinity, Shenzhen (China), 2017

Structuring Shadows, RX Gallery, Paris (France), 2017

Illusory perspectives, Centre Pompidou (France), 2016.

== Public collections ==
Watson library, Metropolitan Museum of Art, New York (for the monograph Still lifes of spacetime, 2020, (Letter of confirmation received, the monograph is under digitalization as per the Museum team))

K11 Foundation

Fosun Foundation

Several of his exhibition catalogues and art editions, including the monograph Still Lifes of Spacetime, are archived at the Bibliothèque nationale de France as part of the legal deposit.

== Publications ==
Still Lifes of Spacetime, monograph published by Les Presses du Réel in 2020. (ISBN 978-2-37896-371-2)

== Critical reception ==
Thomas Canto’s work has been featured in both general and specialized media:

My Modern MET, 2022

France info, Les bains douches project, 2013

Le Monde, Les bains douches project, 2013

Libération(France): A window open to a horizon, 2015

Design Playground, 2015

Arrested Motion Illusory perspectives at Centre Pompidou, 2017

Artprice Positions Berlin, 2019

Forbes, 2016

Design China, 2016

Widewalls, Artist of the week, 2015

Brooklyn Street Art : Review of the exhibition at Wunderkammern, Rome

Arrested motion, Transparent landscapes at Atelier des Bains, 2014

Journal du Design: Feature on "Still Lifes of Space Time"

Critical essay about Architectonic Harmonies solo show by Joana P. Neves, 2023

The Paper, China, 2024

French Morning, 2013
