= Riad (name) =

Riad, also less commonly spelled Ryad, Riyad or Riyadh (Arabic: رياض, romanized: Riyāḍ, pronounced [riːˈɑːdˤ]), is a masculine Arabic given name and surname, meaning "meadows", "gardens".

== People with the given name ==
- Riad al-Asaad (born 1961), commander of the Free Syrian Army
- Riad Asmat (born 1971), Malaysian businessman
- Riad Bajić (born 1994), Bosnian footballer
- Riad Benayad (born 1996), Algerian footballer
- Riad Benchadi (born 1978), Algerian footballer
- Riad Beyrouti (1944–2019), Syrian painter
- Riad Bouchaker (born 1973), Algerian perpetrator of a mass stabbing
- Riad Chibani (born 1964), Algerian judoka
- Riad Darar (born 1954), Syrian activist and author
- Riad Hammadou (born 1976), Algerian footballer
- Riad Higazy (1919–1967), Egyptian earth scientist
- Riad Ismat (1947–2020), Syrian politician
- Riad Jarjour (born 1948), Syrian Christian clergyman
- Riaad Moosa (born 1977), Indian-born South African comedian
- Riad Nouri (born 1985), French-Algerian footballer
- Riad Rahal (born 1950), Lebanese Greek Orthodox surgeon and politician
- Riad Ribeiro (born 1981), Brazilian volleyballer
- Riad Salamé (born 1950), Lebanese banker and governor
- Riad al-Saray (1975–2010), Iraqi journalist, television presenter, lawyer, and politician
- Riad Seif (born 1946), Syrian political dissident and businessman
- Riad Shehata (died 1942), Egyptian photographer
- Riad Al Solh (1894–1951), first prime minister of Lebanon
- Riad Al Sunbati (1906–1981), Egyptian composer and musician
- Riad Taha (1927–1980), Lebanese journalist
- Riad al-Turk (1930–2024), Syrian politician
- Riad Yassin (born 1955), Yemeni politician and diplomat
- Riad Yunes (1928–??), Dominican sports shooter

=== Ryad ===
- Ryad Assani-Razaki (born 1981), Beninese-Canadian writer
- Ryad Boudebouz (born 1990), Algerian-French footballer
- Mohamed Ryad Garidi (born 1977), Algerian rower
- Ryad Hachem (born 1998), French footballer
- Mohamed Ryad Ben Haddad (born 1959), Algerian hurdler
- Ryad Kenniche (born 1993), Algerian footballer
- Ryad Kerbouz (born 1969), Algerian-born French-American singer-songwriter and multi-instrumentalist
- Ryad Merhy (born 1992), Ivorian-born Belgian professional boxer
- Ryad Mezzour (born 1971), Moroccan politician and engineer

=== Riyad ===
- Riyad Naasan Agha (1947–2025), Syrian politician
- Riyadh Al-Azzawi (born 1986), Iraqi-born British kickboxer
- Riyadh Khalaf, (born 1991) Irish broadcaster, author, and YouTuber
- Riyad Hassan El-Khoudary (born 1943), Palestinian academic
- Riyad Mahrez (born 1991), Algerian footballer
- Riyad al-Maliki (born 1955), Palestinian politician
- Riyadh Roberts, the legal name of rapper YoungstaCPT (born 1991)

== People with the surname ==
- Ali Mohamed Riad (1904–1978), Egyptian footballer
- Hussein Riad (1897–1965), Egyptian actor
- Ib Riad (born 1985), Japanese musician
- Khadiga Riad (1914–1981), Egyptian painter
- Mahmoud Riad (1917–1992), Egyptian diplomat
- Mohamed Riad (1927–2025), Egyptian scholar and geographer
- Mohamed Ali Riad (1927–1958), Egyptian fencer
- Tarek Riad (born 1960), Egyptian sport shooter
- Tomas Riad (born 1959), Swedish linguist
- Wael Riad (born 1981), Egyptian footballer

== See also ==
- Riyadh the facilitator, pseudonym
- Riaz (name)
- Riyadh (disambiguation)
- Riad (disambiguation)
