= Qasr Al-Hukm metro station =

Metro station in Riyadh, Saudi Arabia

Coordinates: 24.6287°N 46.7162°E

Qasr Al-Hukm Metro Station محطة قطار قصر الحكم

General information
- Location: Al-Qiri Neighbourhood, Riyadh, Saudi Arabia
- Lines: Blue Line; Orange Line
- Tracks: 4
- Connections: Bus

Other information
- Status: Operational
- Station code: 28 (Blue Line); 20 (Orange Line)

History
- Opened: February 26, 2025

Services
Preceding station	Riyadh Metro	Following station
Al-Bat'ha towards SAB Bank	Line 1	Al-Owd towards Ad Dar Al-Baida
Courts Complex towards Jeddah Road	Line 3	Al-Hilla towards Khashm Al-An
Location

Qasr Al-Hukm Metro Station (Arabic: محطة قطار قصر الحكم) is a rapid transit interchange station in the Al-Qiri neighborhood of Riyadh, Saudi Arabia. It serves the Blue Line and Orange Line of the Riyadh Metro and is located south of the Qasr Al-Hukm District.

== Overview ==
Designed in 2012 by Snøhetta, the station resembles a stainless-steel canopy resting on a large slanted wall that incorporates elements of Najdi architectural style.

It covers an area of 22,500 square meters and is one of the four interchange stations of the Riyadh Metro.

Qasr Al-Hukm station precedes the Al-Owd station and succeeds the Al-Bat'ha station on the Blue Line. On the Orange Line, it comes before Al-Hilla station and after the Courts Complex station.

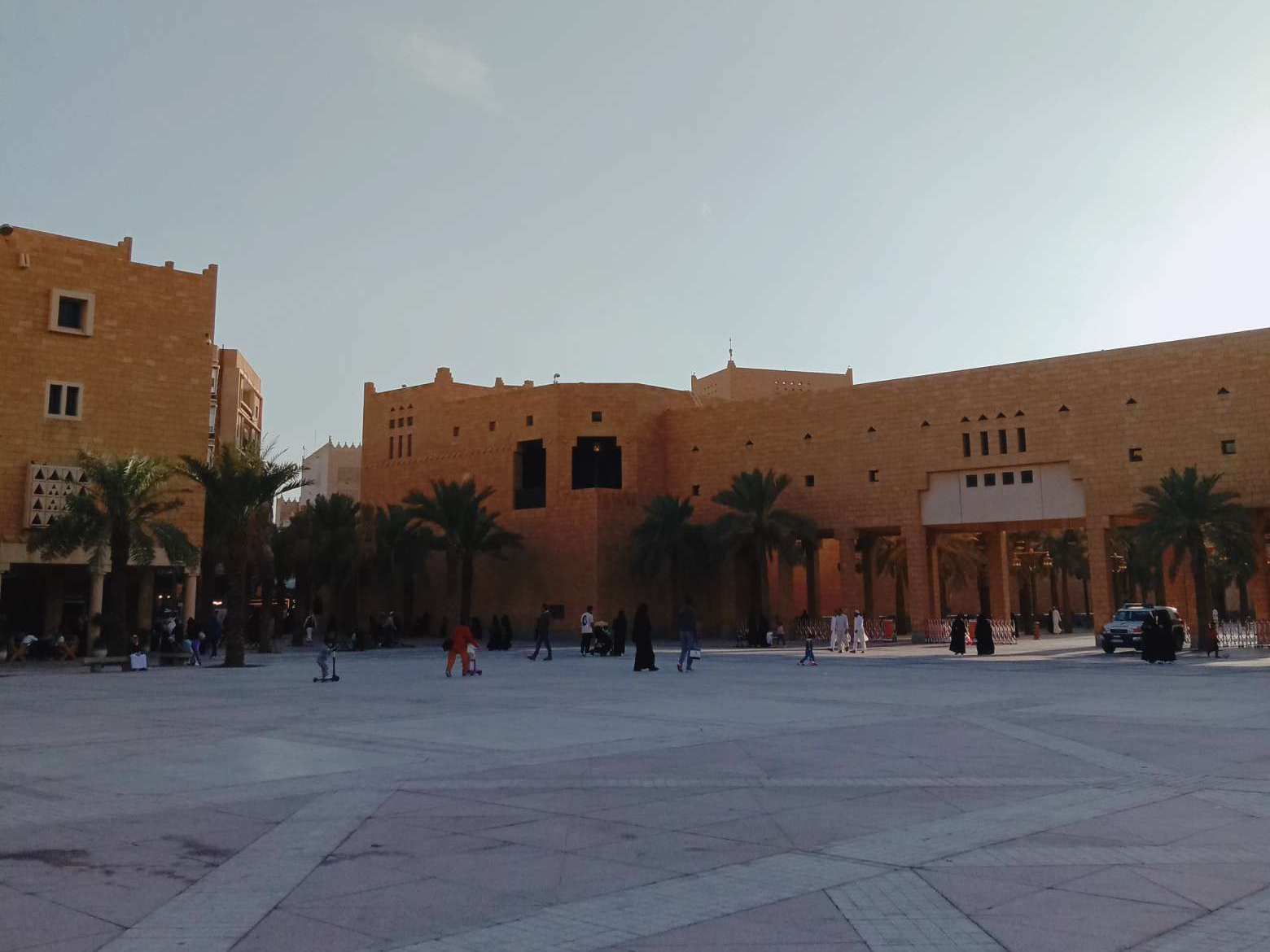
Qasr Al-Hukm Palace

The designs for the station were finalized in 2012 and construction work began in 2014. By 2015, it was reported that 60% excavations were completed on the site.

The station opened to the public on February 26, 2025.
