= National Museum metro station =

Coordinates: 24.6456°N 46.7138°E

National Museum المتحف الوطني
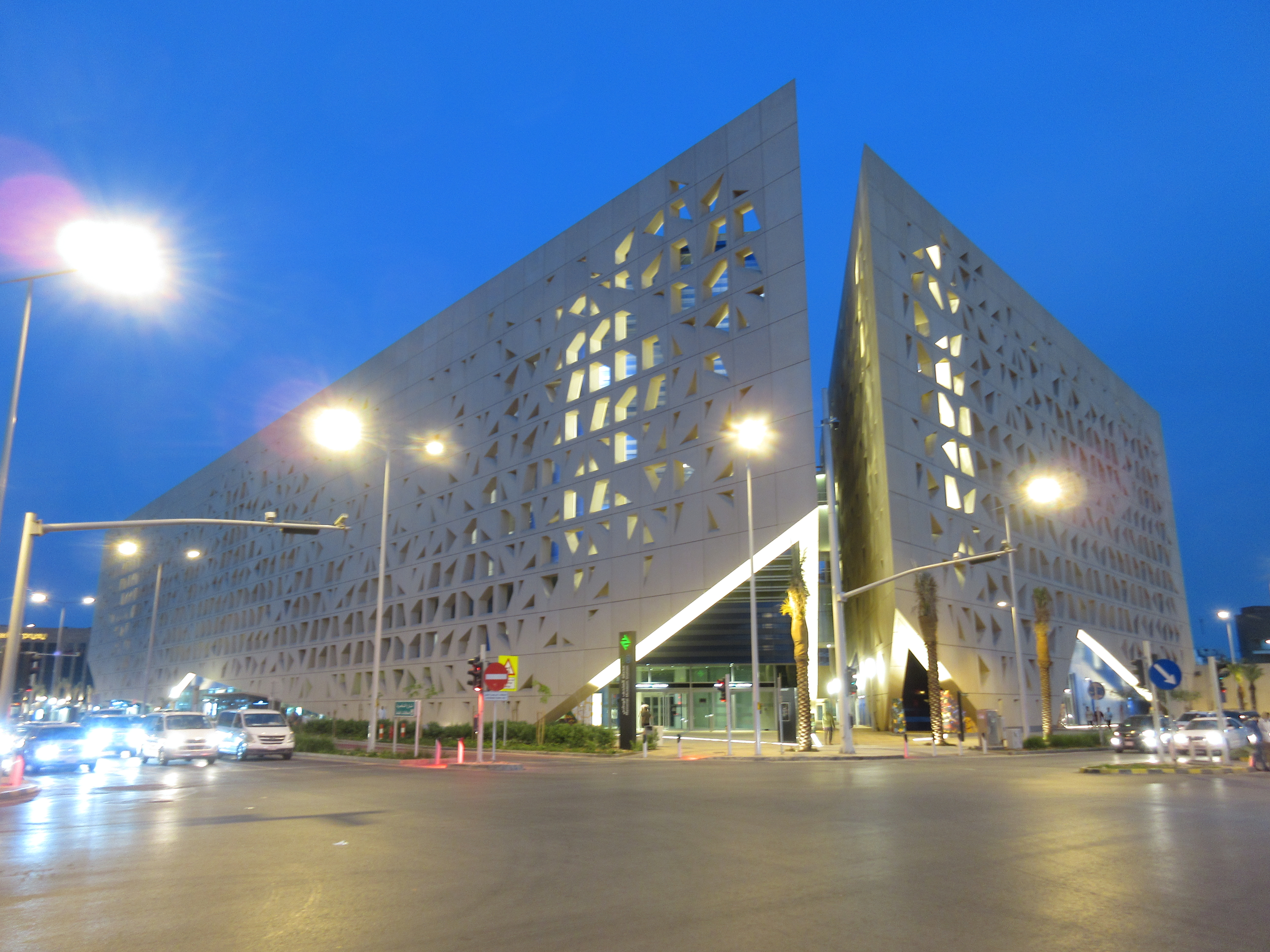

General information
- Location: Batha Street, Al Fouta, Riyadh, Saudi Arabia
- Lines: Blue Line; Green Line

Other information
- Station code: 26 (Blue Line); 22 (Green Line)

Services
Preceding station	Riyadh Metro	Following station
Passport Department towards SAB Bank	Line 1	Al-Bat'ha towards Ad Dar Al-Baida
Ministry of Finance towards Ministry of Education	Line 5	Terminus
Location

National Museum (Arabic: المتحف الوطني) is a rapid transit station that currently serves the Blue and Green Lines of Riyadh Metro in the Al-Futah neighborhood of Riyadh, Saudi Arabia, located next to the King Abdulaziz Historical Center. It covers an area of 72000 square meters.

It precedes the Al-Bat'ha station and succeeds the Passport Department station on the Blue Line whereas comes after the Ministry of Finance station on the Green Line.

The station's external envelope is designed to replicate Saudi Arabia' mountainous region, with a unique double skin facade, internal blue panels replicating the sky and external concrete panels through which the blue can be seen, to represent the mountains, the station is unique in that it also has a new bus terminal adjacent, the design of which is to replicate a Bedouin tent.

The station was temporarily excluded from operation following the opening of Green and Red lines on 15 December 2024.
