= Line 1 (Riyadh Metro) =

Metro line in Riyadh, Saudi Arabia

Blue Line
- Riyadh Metro map

Overview
- Other name: Line 1
- Status: Operating
- Owner: Royal Commission for Riyadh City
- Locale: Riyadh, Saudi Arabia
- Termini: SAB Bank; Ad Dar Al-Baida
- Stations: 25

Service
- Type: Rapid transit
- System: Riyadh Metro
- Rolling stock: Siemens Inspiro

History
- Opened: 1 December 2024; 10 months ago

Technical
- Line length: 38 kilometers (24 mi)
- Track gauge: 1,435 mm (4 ft 8 1/2 in)

The Blue Line (Arabic: المسار الأزرق) or Line 1 is one of the six lines of the Riyadh Metro network in Riyadh, Saudi Arabia. It runs in a north–south direction along Olaya and Batha Streets, starting just north of King Salman Bin Abdul Aziz Street and ending at Dar Al-Baida Sports Ground in the south. There are 25 stations and 4 interchange stations on the line, spanning from SABB to Ad Dar Al-Baida, covering 38 km.

== Overview ==
It was built and designed by consortium of Bechtel, Almabani, CCC and Siemens.

== Route ==
Code	Station Name	Interchange station to
11	SABB	
12	Dr Sulaiman Al-Habib	Dr Sulaiman Al-Habib hospital Al-Shabab Club Stadium
13	KAFD	4 6
14	Al-Murooj	
15	King Fahad District	
16	King Fahad District 2	
17	STC	2
18	Al-Wurud 2	
19	Al-Urubah	
20	Alinma Bank	Community Bus route 9 Purple Line Olaya 14 and Olaya 15
21	Bank Albilad	
22	King Fahad Library	
23	Ministry of Interior	
24	Al-Murabba	
25	Passport Department	
26	National Museum	5
27	Al-Bat'ha	
28	Qasr Al-Hokm	3
29	Al-Owd	
30	Skirinah	
31	Manfouhah	Rapid Transit Bus line Manfuha 19
32	Al-Iman Hospital	
33	Transportation Center	Transportation Center Interchange
34	Al-Aziziah	
35	Ad Dar Al-Baida	
