= Museum Station =

Museum Station may refer to:

- Museum railway station, an underground commuter rail station in Sydney, Australia
- Museum station (Toronto), a station on the Toronto subway in Ontario, Canada
- Melbourne Central railway station, called Museum 1981–1995

== See also ==
- British Museum tube station, a disused station on the London Underground
- Gimhae National Museum station, a Busan Metro station in Gimhae city, South Korea
- Muzeum (Prague Metro), a station on the Prague metro
- Muzium Negara MRT station, an underground Mass Rapid Transit station in Kuala Lumpur, Malaysia
- National Museum station, a Doha Metro station in Qatar
- National Museum metro station, a Riyadh Metro station in Saudi Arabia
- Science Museum station, a station on the Shenzhen Metro, China
- Southwest Museum station, a light rail station in the Los Angeles County Metro Rail system
