= Innovia Metro =

Automated rapid transit system

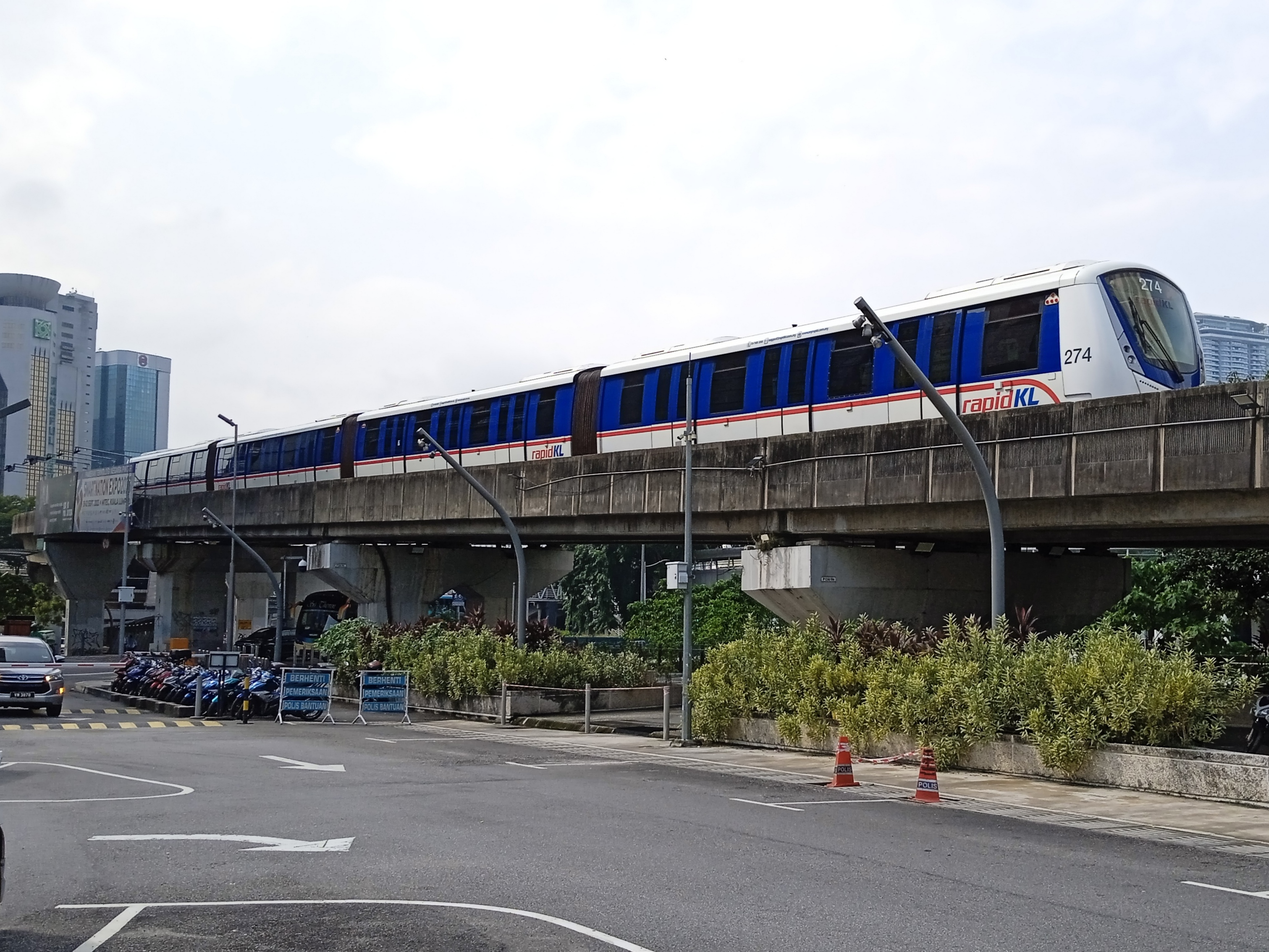
- An Innovia Metro 300 train of Rapid KL, Kuala Lumpur

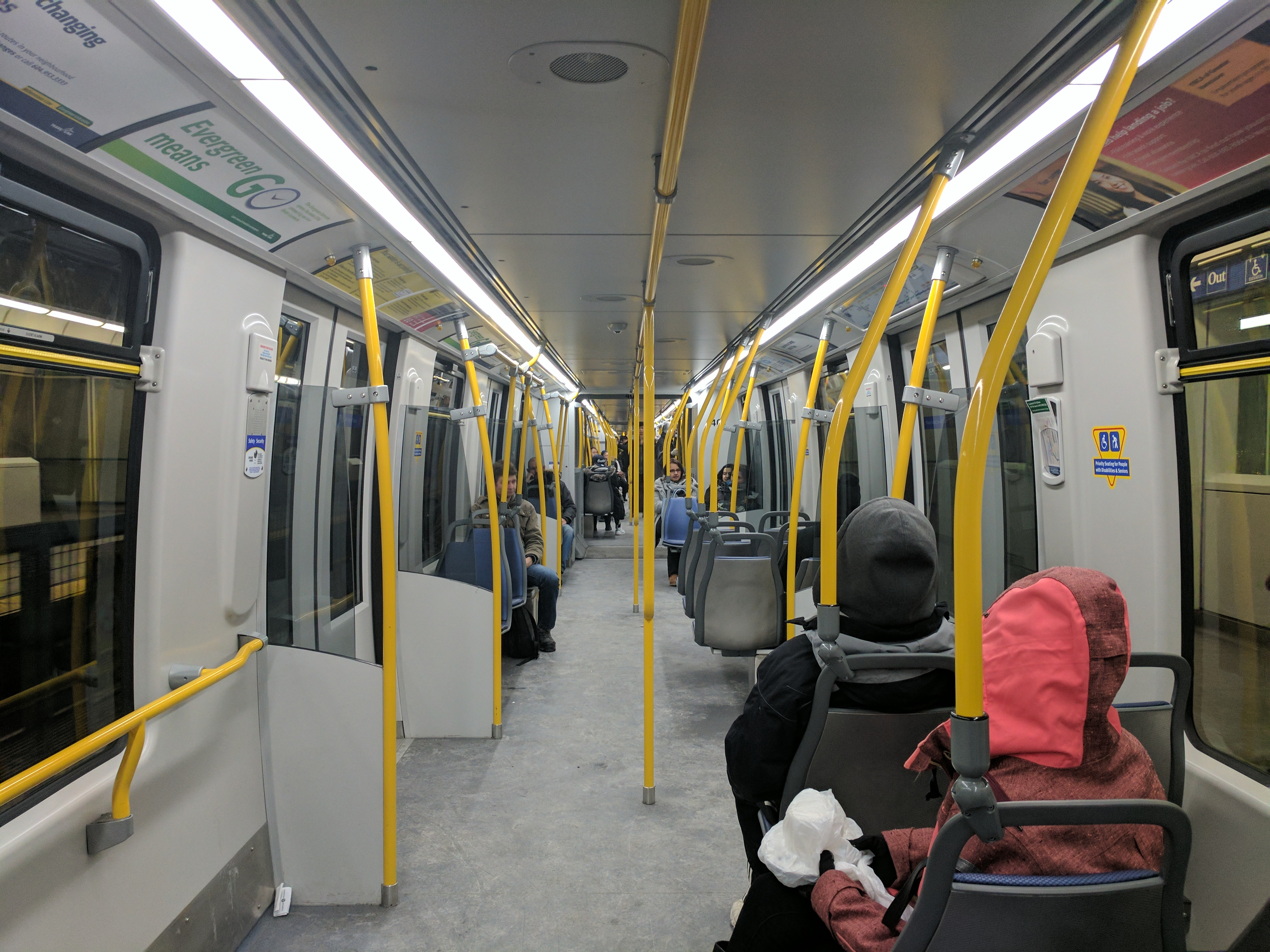
- Interior of Innovia Metro 300 train of Vancouver SkyTrain
- In service: 1985–present
- Manufacturers: UTDC (1981–1992); Bombardier (1992–2021); Alstom (2021–present)
- Designer: UTDC
- Family name: Innovia
- Constructed: 1981–present
- Successor: Alstom Metropolis
- Formation: 1–6 car trainsets
- Operators: Current: Vancouver SkyTrain; Detroit People Mover; Rapid KL (Kuala Lumpur); AirTrain JFK; Beijing Subway; Yongin EverLine; Riyadh Metro; Former: Toronto subway (1985–2023)
- Lines served: Expo, Millennium (Vancouver SkyTrain); Kelana Jaya Line (Kuala Lumpur Rapid KL); Capital Airport Express (Beijing Subway); Line 3 (Riyadh Metro); Former: Line 3 Scarborough (Toronto subway)

Specifications
- Maximum speed: Design: 100 km/h (62 mph); Operation: 80 km/h (50 mph)
- Traction system: ART 100: GTO–VVVF (UTDC); ART 200 (original): IGBT–VVVF (Toshiba linear); ART 200, Metro 300 and newer: IGBT–VVVF (Bombardier MITRAC)
- Electric systems: 650–750 V DC fourth rail linear induction (linear motor); 600 V DC fifth rail (TTC)
- Track gauge: 1,435 mm (4 ft 8 1/2 in) standard gauge

Innovia Metro is an automated rapid transit system manufactured by Alstom. Innovia Metro systems run on conventional metal rails and pull power from a third rail but are powered by a linear induction motor that provides traction by using magnetic force to pull on a "fourth rail" (a flat aluminum slab) placed between the running rails. However, newer versions of the technology are available with standard electric rotary propulsion.

The design was originally developed in the 1970s by the Urban Transportation Development Corporation (UTDC), a Government of Ontario–owned crown corporation. It was designed as a system that would provide economic rapid transit service in the suburbs, which would have ridership levels between what a bus could serve at the low-end, or a subway at the high-end. During development, the system was known as the ICTS (Intermediate Capacity Transit System). The ICTS was chosen for lines in Vancouver, Toronto, and Detroit. Further sales were not forthcoming and the Ontario government lost interest in the company, selling it to Lavalin of Quebec in 1986. Lavalin ran into serious financial difficulties and the UTDC returned to Ontario control, only to be immediately sold to Bombardier Transportation.

Bombardier used the name Advanced Rapid Transit (ART) after its acquisition of the technology. The company was much more active in developing and promoting this system, introducing a major new revision and winning several additional sales in New York City, Beijing, Kuala Lumpur and Yongin, near Seoul.

Bombardier would later be purchased by Alstom, which continues to market the technology. The latest version is marketed as the Innovia Metro, while previous models are retroactively branded as Innovia ART. The largest system is part of the Vancouver SkyTrain metro network, which has seen several major expansions over its lifetime. It operates just under 50 kilometres (31 mi) of track compatible with Innovia Metro trains. Vancouver was the first to order Innovia Metro 300 vehicles. Since then, vehicle orders for the latest Innovia Metro technology have been made by transit authorities in Kuala Lumpur and Riyadh.

== History ==
=== Development stage ===
During the 1950s, Toronto experienced the same sort of urban sprawl that was sweeping through the United States. This caused enormous traffic problems within the city, and a network of new highways to address the problem became part of the Official Plan in 1959. By the mid-1960s, there was a growing awareness that the growth of the suburbs led to a flight of capital from the city cores, resulting in the urban decay being seen throughout the US leading to freeway revolts across North America. Activists inspired by urbanist Jane Jacobs rallied to oppose development of the Spadina Expressway project. The government reconsidered and cancelled the construction of the Spadina Expressway and other planned expressways.

Instead of expressways, Bill Davis and his new Minister of Transport, Charles MacNaughton, outlined the "GO-Urban" plan. GO-Urban called for a system of three advanced mass transit lines that would be run by the newly formed GO Transit. The idea was to select a system with low capital costs, one that would be cost effective in low-density areas where a traditional subway would be too expensive to build and operate. Designed to have a design capacity half-way between buses and subways, the new system was referred to as the Intermediate Capacity Transit System or ICTS. The space age automated guideway transit (AGT) systems being designed in the late 1960s seemed like the right solution.

Toronto was not the only city looking for such a solution, and there appeared to be a large market for automated transit systems in the 1970s and 80s. As GO-Urban was larger than most networks being considered, practically every company working on an AGT, or hoping to, submitted a proposal. The first cut reduced the field to a still-large fourteen proposals. After a year-long selection process, GO selected the Krauss-Maffei Transurban maglev as the preferred solution. As a maglev, the system would be silent, addressing concerns about noise on elevated portions of the track. Additionally, the system's linear induction motor did not require physical contact for traction, which meant it would run with equal capacity in snow or icy conditions. Krauss-Maffei agreed to do all vehicle construction in Ontario, and allow the local office to handle all sales efforts in North America – a stipulation most US companies were not willing to agree to. Local testing, construction and sales were centralized in the newly created "Ontario Transportation Development Corporation" (OTDC).

Construction of a test track on the grounds of the Canadian National Exhibition started in late 1975, but shortly after this Krauss-Maffei announced that development funding provided by the German government was ending. Ontario was not willing to continue funding development of the system on their own, and cancelled the maglev plans.

=== Rebirth ===
Instead of returning to their earlier submissions, the OTDC decided to press ahead with many portions of the existing ICTS design. On April 14, 1975, the Ministry of Transportation arranged financing for Phase I and II studies to develop the new version. In June 1975, OTDC announced that it had arranged a consortium to continue the development of the ICTS, changing their name to "Urban Transportation Development Corporation" (UTDC) to avoid any "provinciality" during their efforts to market the design to other cities.

The result was essentially a larger, rubber-wheeled version of the original maglev vehicle. The consortium included of SPAR Aerospace for the linear induction motor, Standard Elektrik Lorenz (SEL) for the automatic control system, Dofasco for the bogies, Alcan and Canadair for the design of the car bodies and a set of prototypes, and Canadair as the overall prime contractor. The arrangements, funding and final system definitions were in place by 1976.

Between 1976 and 1980, three prototype cars were built. The first immediately demonstrated a problem with the rubber-wheeled bogies. The linear induction motor required very accurate positioning about 15 millimetres (0.59 in) above its "reaction rail" in order to work efficiently and the slight give in the wheels was enough to make this a problem. The obvious solution to this would be to use steel wheels instead, but that would re-introduce the noise problem as the trains rounded curves in the tracks. A new solution was selected, using steel wheels with an articulated bogie that would steer each wheel set into the direction of the track and thereby avoid the rubbing between the flange and track that caused the screeching noise. UTDC bought two modern articulated bogie patents from a private developer in the United States, which were further developed by Dofasco.

A dedicated test facility was desired; modelled after the similar Transit Testing Center set up in the US as part of their own mass transit developments, the site would be open to use for any company that wanted to test new technologies without the need to build out their own testing sites. A 480-acre (190 ha) site in Millhaven, outside of Kingston, Ontario, was selected for the new test centre. Kingston had been home to the Canadian Locomotive Company that closed its doors in 1969, and the city lobbied hard for the new company to locate to their city.

The site was officially opened on September 29, 1978, by James Snow, the Minister of Transportation and Communications. The site included a 1.9-kilometre (1.2 mi) oval test track that included at-grade, elevated and ramped sections, switches, and the automatic control centre. Phase III of the ICTS program ended on January 31, 1980, when testing on the prototype was completed at the Millhaven site, by this point the government had invested about $57.2 million, of a total $63 million spent on the product by the government and its industrial partners.

=== Initial sales ===
By the late 1970s, it appeared there were no more technology issues to overcome and efforts turned to debugging the system and developing methods for mass production. As this process started, UTDC started its own efforts to market the design. Toronto, the inspiration for the system, was an obvious target, but the company also found interest in the system in Ottawa, Hamilton, Vancouver, Detroit and Los Angeles.

A test system in Toronto was the primary concern. With the GO-Urban concept having since been cancelled, and GO Transit having turned to conventional heavy rail systems, the only suitable local market was the Toronto Transit Commission (TTC). The TTC had recently extended the east–west Bloor-Danforth subway line with the addition of another station on each end of the line, and had planned to further extend the line with streetcars running from those stations into the suburbs. Construction had already started on the streetcar system at the eastern end of the line at Kennedy station.

The provincial government asked the TTC to switch the streetcar line to the ICTS. The TTC was uninterested until the government threatened to pull their financing, which accounted for 75% of its capital budget. In exchange, the government agreed to pay for any cost overruns above the original streetcar budget. Construction of the internal streetcar platform and a turn-around loop had already been completed at the station. The platform had to be raised to the higher floor height of the ICTS, but UTDC claimed the vehicle would be able to make its way around the existing 18-metre (59 ft) radius loop at 10 km/h (6.2 mph) without additional modification.

Vancouver proved very interested in the system on its own merits. As early as 1978, the city had been planning a transportation-themed event for its centennial in 1986, and in 1980 they won the rights to host the Expo '86 World's Fair, giving it the theme "Transportation and Communications". The city is newer than Toronto and more spread out, making a traditional subway unattractive – precisely the problem that the ICTS had been designed to solve. The ICTS vehicle design, with shorter vehicle heights, was also ideal, as the old heavy-rail Dunsmuir Tunnel in downtown Vancouver could be easily modified and split into two stacked tunnels. With UTDC interested in showcasing the system at the Expo, and the Expo backers interested in a transit solution that could be open in time for the show, a deal was quickly arranged that was attractive to both parties. At the time, it was a somewhat controversial project and had its detractors.

Detroit had been one of six cities selected for rapid development under the United States Urban Mass Transportation Administration (UMTA) Downtown People Mover (DPM) program. After ten years, little actual development had taken place and UMTA was mandated to install systems with all possible speed. None of the high-tech developments funded by UMTA had been installed, nor developed to the point where they were ready for service. Instead, the Detroit system was favouring the Cabinentaxi system from Germany, but that company decided to pull out of the contest in order to focus on a larger development in Hamburg. The UTDC responded to a "buy American" clause in UMTA by opening a branch office in Detroit, and that immediately swung the decision in their favour. However, with the Ronald Reagan administration taking office in 1981, DPM was rapidly de-funded. Four of the five cities ended their development plans, but Detroit and Miami (using a different design) decided to press ahead with their deployments.

Construction of the Toronto and Vancouver systems proceeded apace, with the Scarborough RT opening for service on March 22, 1985, followed by the SkyTrain on December 11, 1985, with passenger service starting in January.

=== Hiatus ===
Sales of additional ICTS systems went nowhere, and the government began to worry about UTDC's continued successes. The government pushed any potential deployment to buy from UTDC, but with only one product, and that product having many problems in Toronto, there was little interest from other cities. At the same time, the buy-UTDC clause locked Hawker Siddeley Canada out of many local projects, and they had formerly been a major supplier in the local market. The solution was to form a 50–50 combined company, Can-Car Rail, who marketed the combined product line. Hawker had a number of successful products, notably their Bombardier BiLevel Coach, and as these other products were selling well through this period, interest in actively selling ICTS waned.

In spite of Can-Car's success in other markets, as early as 1981 the government had considered selling UTDC to the private sector. Their concern was that without a manufacturing business, UTDC would find it difficult to make enough income to justify its Kingston operations. If the company did start a manufacturing side, it would be inappropriate for the company to remain government owned. The Can-Car deal put this on hold for a time.

In 1986 the new Ontario government announced their intention to sell UTDC to Lavalin, a large engineering company in Montreal. Lavalin purchased the company for only CAD$50 million, less than the $70 million spent on the UTDC by the government up to 1981. The sale was highly controversial at the time, due to several non-performance payments due to the early problems on the ICTS that had to be paid out by the government, to the tune of $39 million. Soon after, Hawker Siddeley announced that they were selling their remaining interest in Can-Car to Lavalin as well.

=== Innovia ART ===
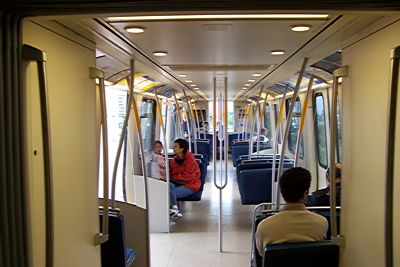
Vancouver uses the original Innovia ART 100; the Innovia ART 200 vehicles (pictured here), whose articulated design allows for a more spacious interior; and the ART 300.

A series of financial difficulties caused by Lavalin's rapid expansion led to its bankruptcy. A clause in the original sales contract returned UTDC to Ontario crown control, and they quickly sold it to Bombardier in 1991. Bombardier started a redesign effort for the ICTS, resulting in the larger, advanced rapid transit (ART) Mark II vehicle. Compared to the original ICTS (retroactively named Mark I), the newer ART cars are longer with more seating, and have a more open layout inside.

ART technology was selected for the AirTrain JFK project, which is widely considered a great success in spite of predictions to the contrary. After winning the SkyTrain Millennium Line contract in Vancouver, Bombardier further improved the design by introducing an articulating section between adjacent cars, replacing the coupling and doors of the older Mark I design. The articulation allows passengers to move freely between the cars, as well as adding more internal space for passenger seating. These versions of the Mark II design won several more contracts, and are currently operating on the Kelana Jaya Line in Kuala Lumpur, the Airport Express, Beijing Subway in China (in four-car trains), and the YongIn EverLine near Seoul in South Korea. When Bombardier started marketing ART as part of its Bombardier Innovia family of automated transit systems, the technology was rebranded as the Innovia ART 100 for the Mark I and Innovia ART 200 for the Mark II.

Vancouver continues to be the largest operator of an Innovia ART system, with 49.5 km (30.8 mi) of operational lines in its SkyTrain network (Expo Line and Millennium Line). This network increased in 2016 with the opening of a 10.9-kilometre (6.8 mi) extension of the Millennium Line, named the Evergreen Extension. The SkyTrain system uses a mixed fleet of Innovia ART 100, 200 and 300 cars.

=== Innovia Metro ===
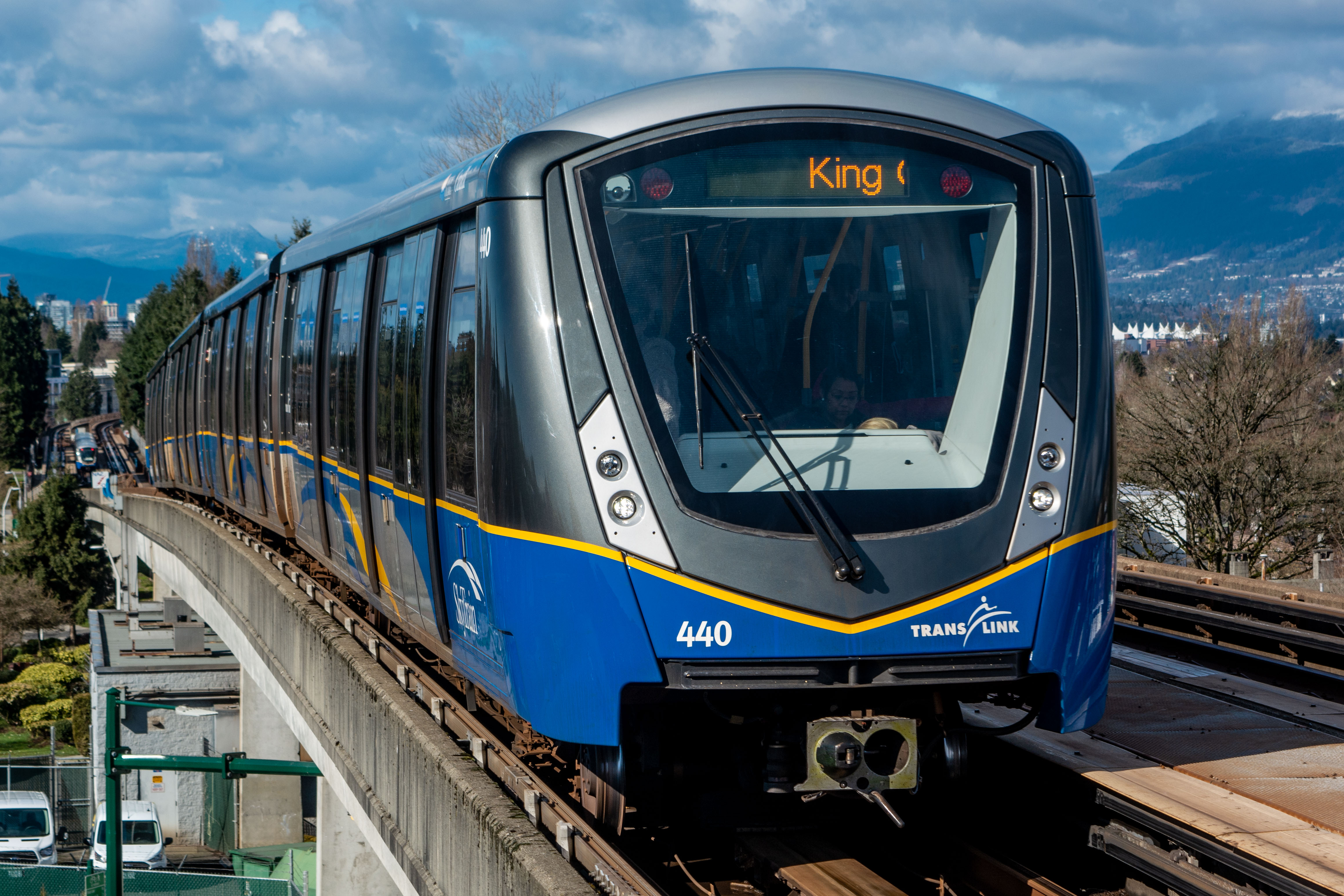
Four-car Bombardier Innovia Metro 300 (ART Mark III) train

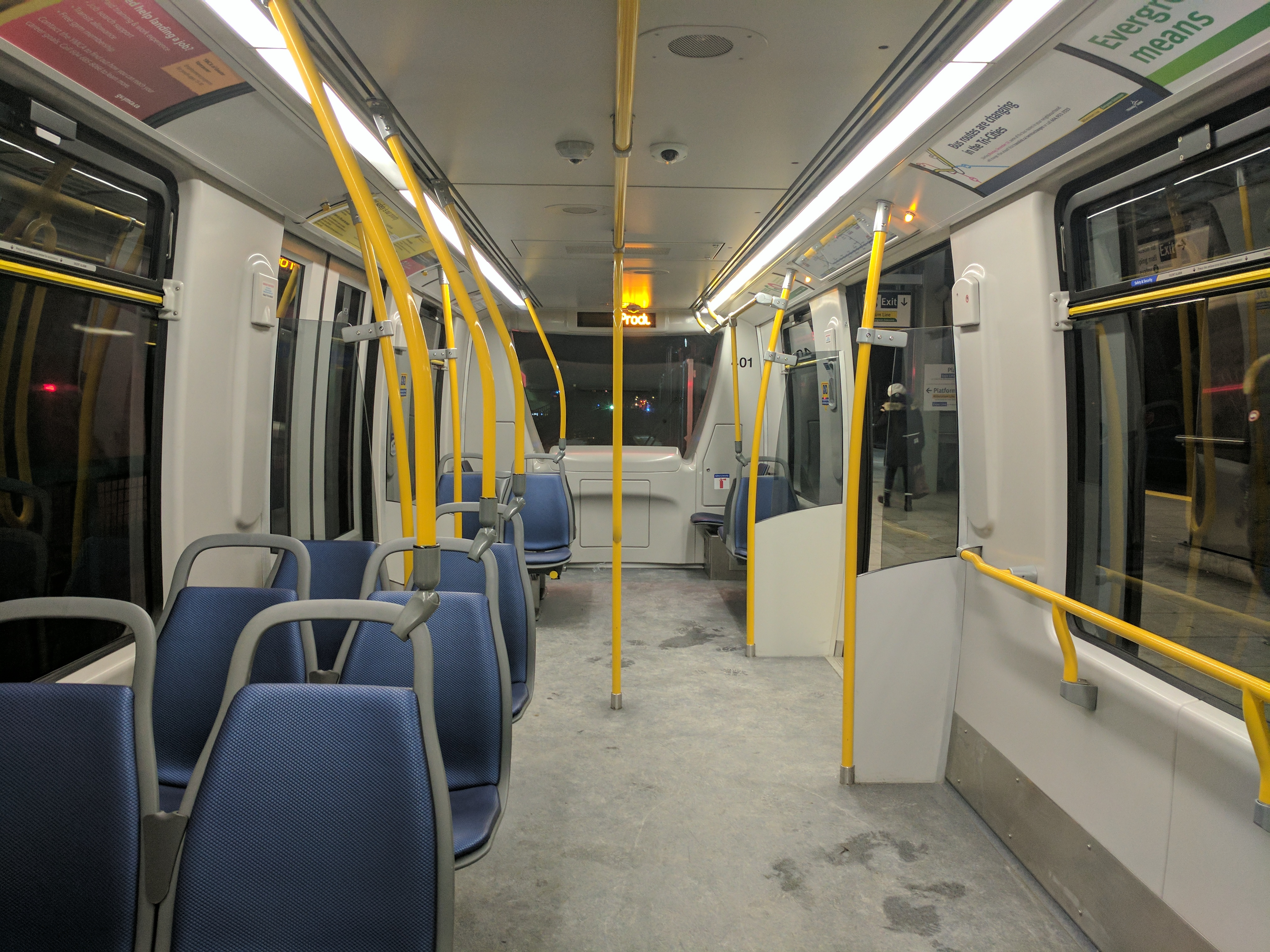
Interior of Mark III car looking toward the end. Notice one side without seats and the larger windows.

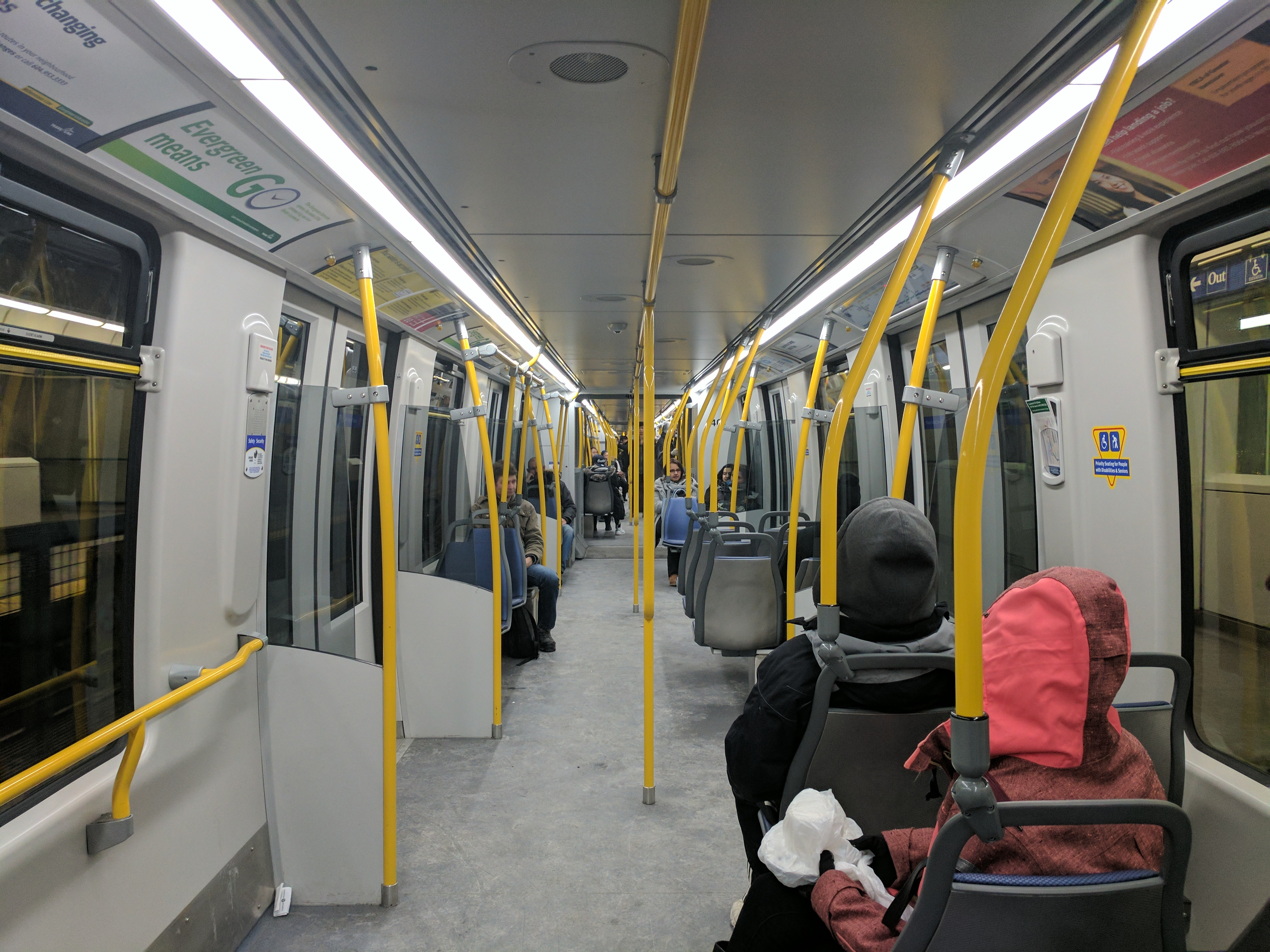
Interior of Mark III car looking toward the centre. Notice the walkway and gangway are even wider than the Mark II 2nd generation.

The latest version of the technology uses the name "Innovia Metro" and is marketed as a mid-size metro system. Innovia Metro is compatible with Bombardier's own CITYFLO 650 integrated transit automation system and is offered in variants compatible with both linear motor and electric rotary propulsion. Bombardier now markets the Innovia Metro alongside the larger Movia Metro and has touted its system versatility.

The first rotary-powered Innovia Metro 300 vehicles were ordered by Riyadh Metro in Saudi Arabia for Line 3 of its new rapid transit network. Those 47 vehicles will be equipped with Bombardier's MITRAC propulsion drives.

== Design ==
=== Control and signalling ===
The ICTS was the original platform for the SelTrac automated control system by Standard Elektrik Lorenz. This system has changed hands several times since then and is currently owned by Thales. SelTrac is a completely automated system, with centralized control. The system originally used a current loop in the track bed to signal to and from the vehicles, but this has been replaced in more modern versions with a variety of radio systems.

In the original system, the current loop also provided positioning by crossing the lines every metre, with an onboard sensor counting the number of times the polarity changed. Additional fine-tuning was available via a wheel rotation counter, which was used for positioning in stations.

The Toronto Transit Commission union, ATU Local 113, rejected automated control as they felt this was the start of a switch to automating the entire fleet, thereby cutting some of the highest paid jobs in the TTC. This led to the Scarborough Rapid Transit vehicles being modified at a high cost to include operator cabins and conventional controls. No other Innovia Metro system uses manual control.

The Innovia Metro 300 systems are marketed to use Bombardier's own CITYFLO 650 automation system, but can also use other automation systems, such as SelTrac.

=== Linear motor ===
The original versions of Innovia Metro were based on a linear induction motor (LIM) using vehicle-mounted windings and a track-mounted stator consisting of a thick steel plate with a thin aluminum plate cover mounted flat between the rails. The steel plate is laminated near stations to increase efficiency during acceleration and braking. The small size and flat shape of the motor, and its lack of a transmission connected to the bogies, allows the ART to be much closer to the ground than a traditional subway car. The motor is used for all control with the exception of final stopping and positioning using disc brakes and emergency braking using a track brake.

The new Innovia Metro still offers linear motor propulsion as the advantageous option but an electric rotary propulsion version is also an option. The first rotary-powered Innovia Metro 300 system is being implemented in Riyadh, Saudi Arabia.

=== Vehicle ===
The Innovia Metro vehicle was built using a lightweight aluminum frame riding on two sets of articulated trucks using small steel wheels. The original Innovia ART 100 cars are 12.7 metres (41 ft 8 in) long. The second generation Innovia ART 200 cars are 16.7 metres (54 ft 9 1/2 in) long each and come in articulated pairs.

By 2011, the Innovia ART 200 design has been updated and Bombardier is currently marketing the third generation as Innovia Metro 300 (retiring the ART branding). While three vehicle orders have been placed, new vehicles are still in the production stage. Vehicle dimensions are similar to the Innovia ART 200 vehicle, but passenger capacity has been increased through redesigned car layout. The vehicles appear sleeker, with larger windows on the sides of the train, and redesigned windows and headlights on the ends of the cars.

=== Similar designs ===
The linear motors and steerable axles used in Innovia Metro trains are relatively rare, although similar Japanese designed linear motor propulsion technologies are also used on a number of subway lines in East Asia, such as the Nagahori Tsurumi-ryokuchi Line, Toei Ōedo Line and Guangzhou Metro Line 5. However, the Innovia Metro system has a number of competitors in the field of automated light metros, including the VAL technology developed by Matra for the Lille Metro in France (and now owned by Siemens) and the Météor technology used by Paris Métro Line 14 (which is built to high-capacity, full metro standards). Furthermore, the CITYFLO and SelTrac signaling technologies are not specific to the Innovia Metro, but can also equip most conventional railway lines regardless of propulsion technology or carrying capacity.

Innovia Metro lines are designed to run on elevated structures, and indeed the systems that use these trains include such sections, with most being predominantly elevated. Using a grade-separated guideway, though, allows them to perform equally well on ground level and in tunnels, as they in fact do for a portion of both Vancouver's Expo and Millennium Lines (using a converted freight tunnel for the Expo line, and a bored tunnel under Clarke Road for the Evergreen Extension), Kuala Lumpur's Kelana Jaya Line, and Beijing's Airport Express. The Scarborough RT in Toronto also includes a short tunnelled section, though there are no stations within it. The Kuala Lumpur and Beijing systems, along with New York's Airtrain JFK, also incorporate platform screen doors commonly found in automated people movers around the world.

Prior to a change in approach to marketing and the introduction of the "Metro" branding, Innovia ART 100 and 200 technologies were sometimes referred to as "light rail", especially in Asia. Because of their use of automated operation and third-rail power, however, they are unsuitable for the unprotected, street-level trams that the term usually indicates in Europe and North America.

== Metros using Innovia Metro technology ==
=== Toronto ===
In 1981, the Toronto Transit Commission (TTC) was planning to build a streetcar line serving the city's eastern district of Scarborough, but the Ontario provincial government convinced it, by threatening to withhold funding, to switch to the Innovia ART 100 technology. This would act as a demonstration system for other transit operators considering buying the trains. In exchange, the government agreed to pay for any cost overruns over the original LRT costs. The 7-kilometre (4.3 mi) six-station Scarborough RT (now called Line 3 Scarborough) line opened in March 1985.

Although its Innovia ART 100 trains are capable of driving themselves, the TTC chose to run them semi-automatically with operators on board in order to keep peace with their main union. This conversion proved much more difficult than imagined; the small confines of the Innovia ART 100 car meant that the traditional Toronto solution of taking up the front-right corner of the cab left too little room for the operator to work in, and the entire front of the car had to be used up, reducing seating. Additionally, the Innovia ART 100 control system was based on "dumb" cars and "smart" control centres, so there was no system on the train itself for control or presenting information. These systems had to be retrofitted and were the cause of considerable expense and confusion.

Entering operation, the problems continued. The braking system had been designed to be fully automated but was now being operated by manual control, and the brakes were being over-applied. This led to problems with the wheels being rubbed flat in spots when the brakes were applied too strongly, producing buzzing noises when running at speed. Since the vehicles were brand-new, the TTC did not have a machine capable of grinding the small-diameter wheels, and one had to be purchased for $1.5 million. Another $250,000 was needed for a rail grinder to remove "totally unexpected rail corrugations". Additionally, the cars were found to be incapable of turning the short radius, 18-metre (59 ft 1 in) turning loop at one end of the line, in spite of UTDC's claims it could, which was going to have to be re-built at a cost of about $6 million. Instead, this portion of the track was simply abandoned.

Over $1 million was originally budgeted to heat the third rail to prevent ice buildup but this feature was later removed as a cost-cutting move. It was believed that the rapid operation (short headways) would keep the rail free of snow as the passing cars heated the rail. This proved not to be the case and in operations at just the wrong conditions close to freezing, the opposite occurred: when the train passed and heated the rail, microscopically thin layers of snow would be melted, and if the rail was below zero as a whole, the water would freeze to the rail and cause ice buildup. Another retrofit was required to solve this problem, by adding wooden covers over the rail, a system used throughout Toronto's subway system. Even with these covers in place, the line can be shut down by any heavy snowfall that covers the fourth rail to a depth that fills the distance between the rail and the linear motor.

Only two of Line 3's stations have ridership comparable to those of the TTC's conventional subway lines, and most passengers see it merely as an extra transfer they must make in order to get onto a subway line running downtown. Although there had been proposals to extend Line 3, none of these gained traction.

With the Innovia ART 100 fleet overdue for replacement and expensive upgrades to the line needed to handle the longer Innovia ART 200 trains, replacement of the line was decided upon. One proposal would have converted the line to use conventional light rail vehicles and seen it extended west by 19 kilometres (11.8 mi), but the city council voted to ask for provincial and federal funding to extend Line 2 Bloor–Danforth, a subway line, from Kennedy station along a new route to Scarborough Centre. Line 3 Scarborough was scheduled to be decommissioned in November 2023, with bus service covering the route until the subway extension opens in 2030. However, an accident involving a car detachment and derailment on July 24, 2023, resulted in the TTC closing the line prematurely.

=== Vancouver ===
The SkyTrain metro network has the largest Innovia Metro system in operation, and currently has two such lines: the Expo Line and the Millennium Line. Vancouver's SkyTrain network continues to maintain on-time reliability over 95%. The Expo Line opened in late 1985, in time for Expo '86. With the opening of the Millennium Line in 2002, Vancouver added to its original Innovia ART 100 fleet the longer, articulated Innovia ART 200 trains first used in Kuala Lumpur, which allow for significantly greater rider capacities.

In 2012, Vancouver began construction of the Evergreen Extension, a 10.9-kilometre (6.8 mi) extension from Burnaby to Coquitlam in the northeast, which the Millennium Line now re-routes to. Although at one point the extension was proposed to be a street-level LRT system that would not have used Innovia ART technology, in 2008 plans were changed back to the SkyTrain option by the provincial government to facilitate higher ridership from increased capacity, shortened travel times and to integrate seamlessly with the existing SkyTrain network. The extension opened on December 2, 2016.

The network of Innovia ART 100, Innovia ART 200, and Innovia Metro 300 are supported by Quester Tangent products, including braking as well as monitoring and diagnostic equipment.

An extension of the Millennium Line west from VCC–Clark station under the Broadway corridor to a station at Arbutus Street began construction in 2020; completion is expected in 2027. The Expo Line's extension from King George station to Langley has an anticipated opening date of 2028. A continuation of the Millennium Line from Arbutus station farther west to the University of British Columbia is pending the outcome of local public consultations.

=== Detroit ===
The 13-station Detroit People Mover is a fully automated system, using the same Innovia ART 100 trains as Toronto and Vancouver. The system had originally been part of UMTA's buildout, which included lines radiating outward from a central circle into the suburbs. However, UMTA was dramatically "downfunded" in the early 1980s, and the Detroit system lost the majority of the funding. Although most other cities on the UMTA list simply gave up on their plans, Detroit decided to press ahead with the portion they could build with the funds they already had, and completed the downtown loop.

The resulting system offers service to a limited area of the downtown core along a 4.7-kilometre (2.9 mi) loop. The point-to-point distances are easily walkable, so the system sees low ridership levels on the order of 7,500 passengers a day. Originally designed to act as the hub of a system with 15 million riders a year, the 2 million riders it currently serves results in a very high cost-per-passenger. According to The Detroit News, this was about $3 per ride, against a fare of only 50 cents.

=== Kuala Lumpur ===
The Kelana Jaya Line in Kuala Lumpur, Malaysia, is a fully automated rail line that opened in 1998. It uses the Innovia ART 200 technology, featuring articulated trains. The line spans 37 stations and covers a distance of 46.4 kilometres (28.8 mi), making it the longest linear induction motor technology-based line.

Operation on the line began on September 1, 1998, between the Lembah Subang Depot and Kelana Jaya to Pasar Seni, with the second section from Pasar Seni to Gombak opening in June 1999. By 2002, the line had served 150 million passengers, with an average daily ridership of 160,000. An extension of the line, spanning 17 kilometres (11 mi), was completed in 2016.

In 2006, Bombardier was awarded a contract for 22 new four-car trains, with an option for an additional 13 trains if required. The order was expanded in 2007 with an additional purchase of 52 train sets. The first batch of new trains began service in December 2009, and by 2014, all 35 train sets had been delivered.

Following the line extension in 2016, a new order for 14 four-car Innovia Metro 300 trains was placed. The trains feature braking systems, monitoring, and diagnostic equipment developed by Quester Tangent. The trains began entering service at the end of 2016.

In October 2022, Rapid Rail, the operator of the Kelana Jaya Line, announced an order for 19 additional Innovia Metro 300 trainsets (76 cars) at a cost of RM1.72 billion (US$385 million). The new trainsets were intended to replace the original Innovia Metro 200 trainsets that had been operating on the line since 1999.

=== New York ===
AirTrain JFK, opened in December 2003, is an automated ART service with Innovia ART 200 rolling stock. Its two branches connect the New York City Subway and Long Island Rail Road to John F. Kennedy International Airport in New York City. This service uses non-articulated Innovia ART 200 cars in trains of one to four cars.

=== Beijing ===
The Airport Express of the Beijing Subway, opened in July 2008, uses Innovia ART 200 technology, with a fleet of 40 locally manufactured vehicles. The route is 28 kilometres (17 mi) long and has four stations.

=== Riyadh ===
The Riyadh Metro in Riyadh, Saudi Arabia, uses Innovia Metro 300 automated trainsets on Line 3, also known as the Orange Line. The fleet consists of 47 two-car trainsets supplied by Bombardier Transportation, which was subsequently acquired by Alstom. The Orange Line runs approximately 41 kilometres (25 mi) from Jeddah Road in the west to the Khashm Al Aan area in the east, making it the longest line in the Riyadh Metro network. The line began passenger operations on 5 January 2025, completing the phased opening of all six lines of the metro network.

=== Yongin ===
The EverLine is an ART line, located in Yongin, a major city in the Seoul Capital Area. The line connects the city to Everland, South Korea's largest theme park, offering a transfer to the Suin–Bundang Line of the Seoul Metropolitan Subway at Giheung Station.

== Demo cars ==
Two demonstrator/prototype Innovia ART 100 cars were built and used for testing at the UTDC urban transit facility Millhaven, Ontario. Unlike the production cars, the demo cars lacked doors at either end of the vehicle. Test Vehicle 1 had windows in the centre and on the driver cab, while Test Vehicle 2 is a trailer car only had a centre window and no driver's cab. The paint scheme on the lead car was orange and white, while the trailer was grey and orange. The interior of the vehicle was unfinished (no seats, incomplete floor/ceiling and plywood panelling covering wiring). Only Test Vehicle 2 remained at the facility and in 2011 it was donated to the Canada Science and Technology Museum in Ottawa.

A mock-up of an Innovia ART 100 car was stored at the Toronto Transit Commission St. Clair Carhouse by Disney Displays. This car was unpainted and non-operational. The fate of this vehicle is unknown.

BC Rail had an Innovia ART 200 test car delivered to test clearance in stations and tunnels for the Millennium Line. It was donated by the BC Rapid Transit Company to the Railway Museum of British Columbia in Squamish, British Columbia, in 2012.

== ALRT car ==
The ALRT car was a proposed rapid-transit vehicle for Greater Toronto's GO ALRT in the early 1980s. The car was to:

- be longer
- use a pantograph
- be an articulated version of the Scarborough RT car
- be capable of high speeds needed for interurban operation

As the required capacity of the ALRT system rose, it eventually approached the size of conventional heavy rail, and ALRT was cancelled in favour of additional diesel units pulling Bombardier BiLevel Coaches, which have since gone on to be one of Bombardier's best-selling products.

The original ALRT design was never produced, as the ALRT program was cancelled in 1985.

== Delivered rolling stock and systems ==
System	Location	System length	Type				
System	Location	System length	Innovia ART 100	Innovia ART 200	Innovia Metro 300	Innovia Metro 300 on order	Innovia Metro Mark V
SkyTrain – Expo, Millennium lines	Vancouver, British Columbia, Canada	59.5 km (37.0 mi)	150	108	84		235
Detroit People Mover	Detroit, Michigan, US	4.7 km (2.9 mi)	12				
Rapid KL – Kelana Jaya line	Kuala Lumpur, Malaysia	46.4 km (28.8 mi)		210	56	108	
AirTrain JFK	New York City, New York, US	13 km (8.1 mi)		32			
Capital Airport Express (Note: Locally designated the QKZ5)	Beijing, China	27 km (16.8 mi)		40			
West Coast Railway Heritage Park	Squamish, British Columbia, Canada	–		1			
EverLine (Note: Locally designated the Y100)	Yongin, South Korea	18.1 km (11.2 mi)		30			
Riyadh Metro – Orange Line	Riyadh, Saudi Arabia	40.7 km (25.3 mi)				94	
Bombardier Transportation Test Facility	Millhaven, Ontario, Canada	1.88 km (1.17 mi)	2		2		
Subtotals			192	421	142	202	235
Total			1192				

=== Former systems ===
A train derailment in July 2023 resulted in the Toronto Transit Commission permanently closing Toronto’s Line 3 Scarborough, which was the original system that made use of Innovia Metro technology, four months ahead of its scheduled closure in November 2023.

System	Location	System length	Type
System	Location	System length	Innovia ART 100
Toronto subway – Line 3 Scarborough (Note: Locally designated the S series)	Toronto, Ontario, Canada	6.4 km (4.0 mi)	28

== Appearances in TV and film ==
A scene in the 2003 movie Paycheck, filmed in Vancouver, shows Ben Affleck running in front of a mockup of a Vancouver SkyTrain Innovia ART 200 train. SkyTrain cars can also be seen in the opening credits of 21 Jump Street and variously in Smallville, The X-Files and in numerous other filmed productions shot in Vancouver.

== Gallery ==
Innovia ART 100
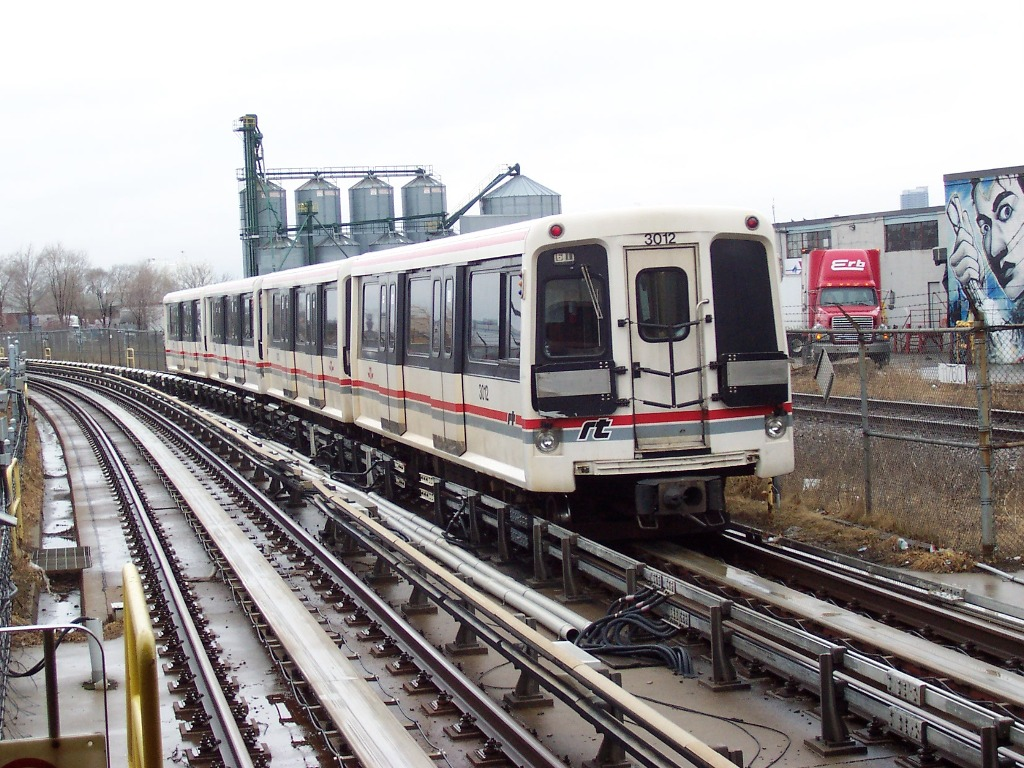
Line 3 Scarborough in Toronto, Canada

SkyTrain at Holdom station in Vancouver, Canada

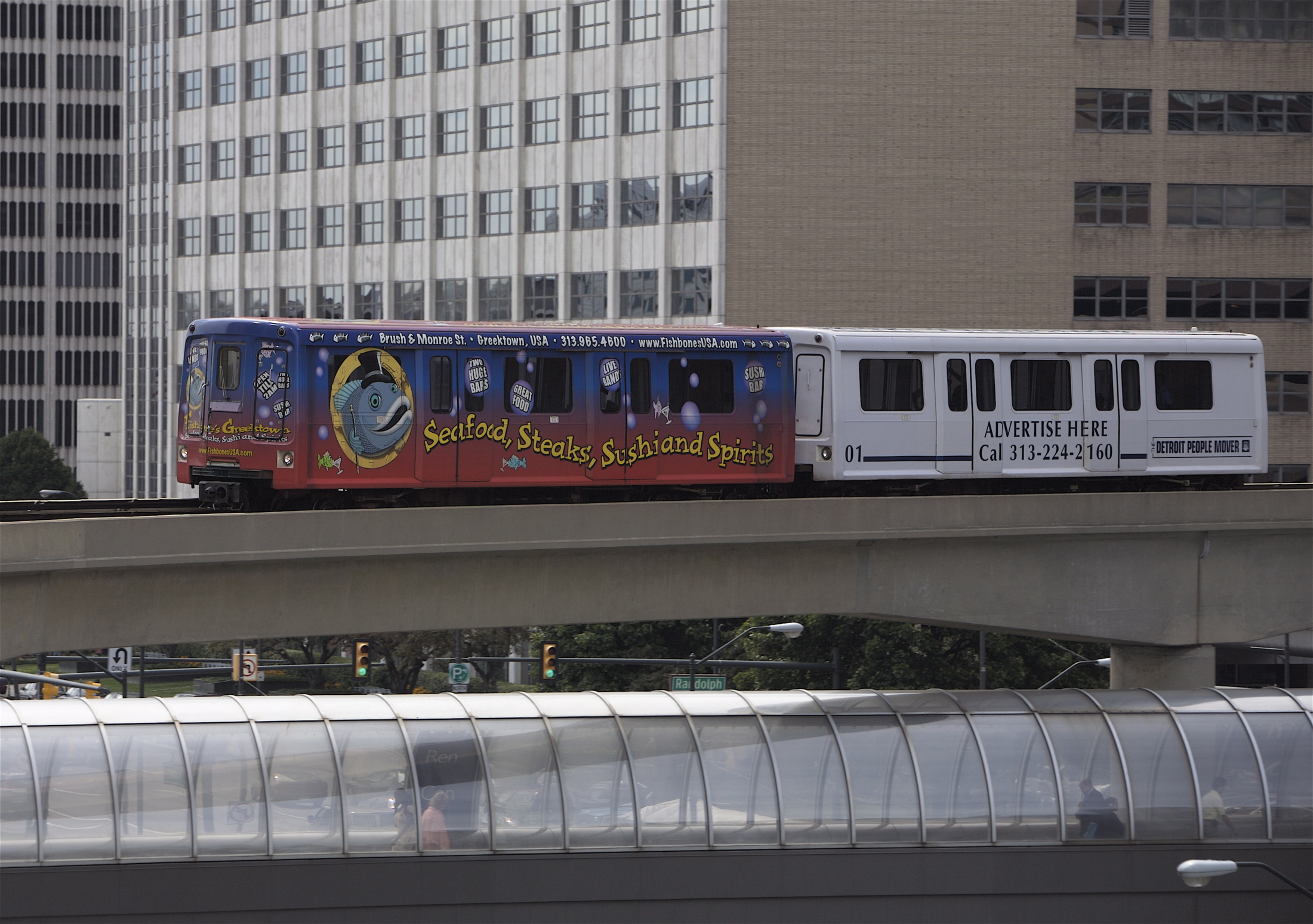
Detroit People Mover in Detroit, United States
Innovia ART 200
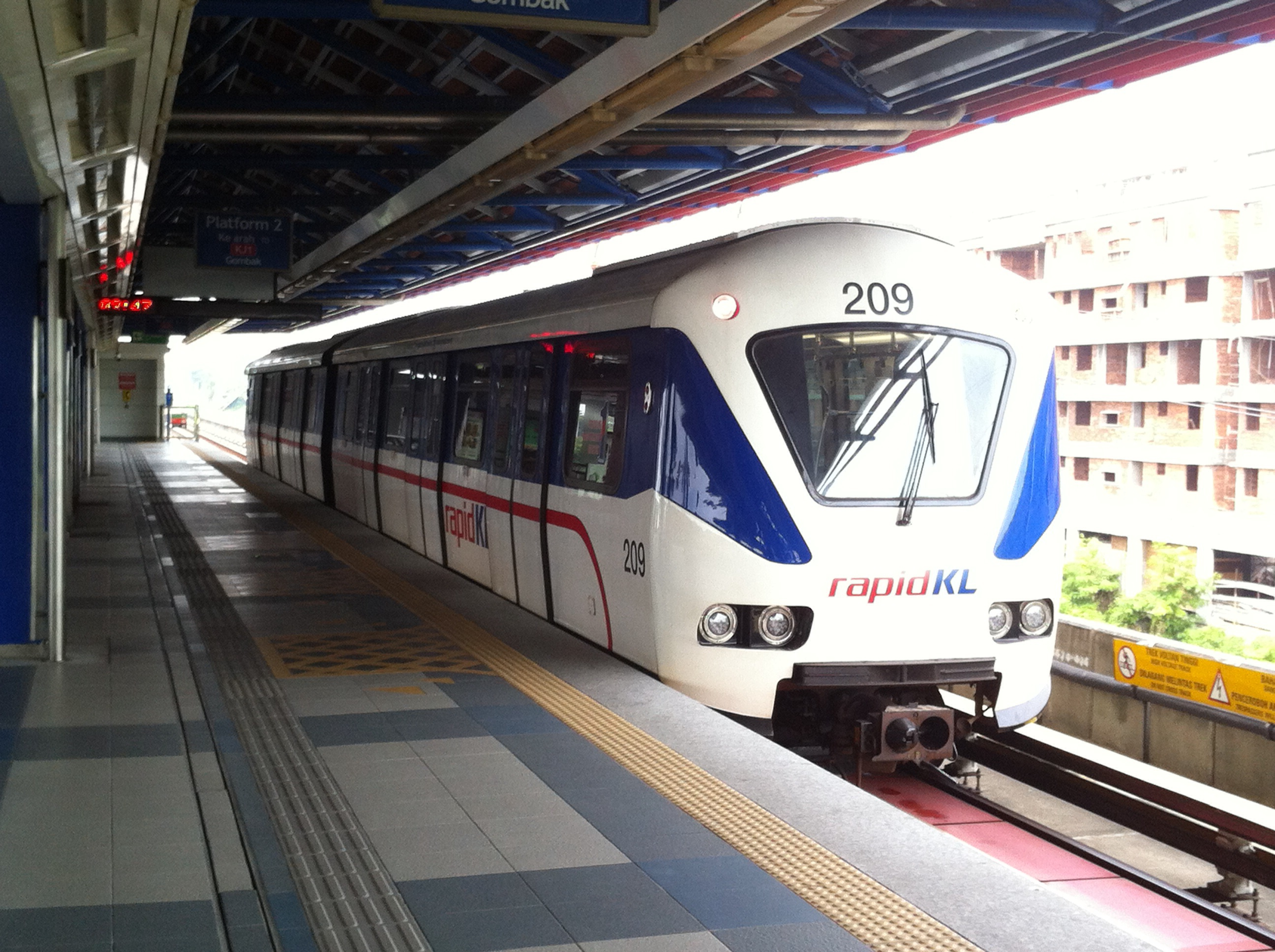
Rapid KL at Kelana Jaya LRT station in Kuala Lumpur, Malaysia

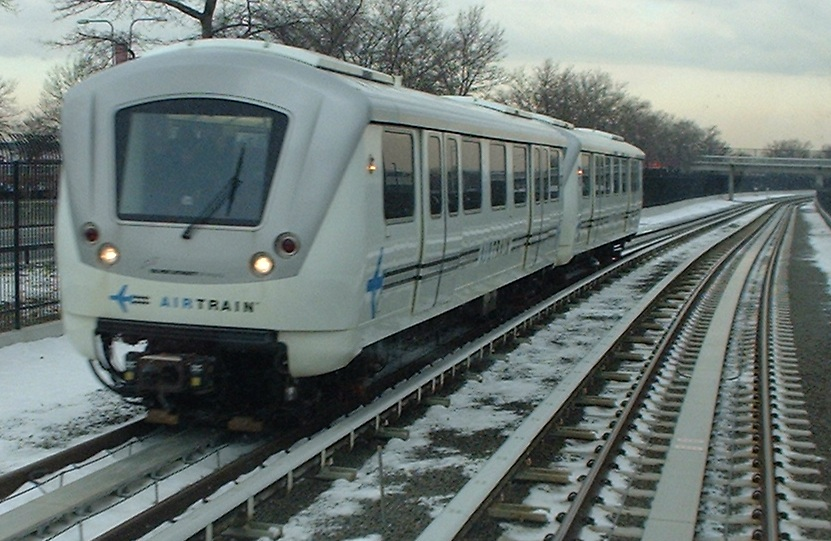
AirTrain JFK in New York City, United States

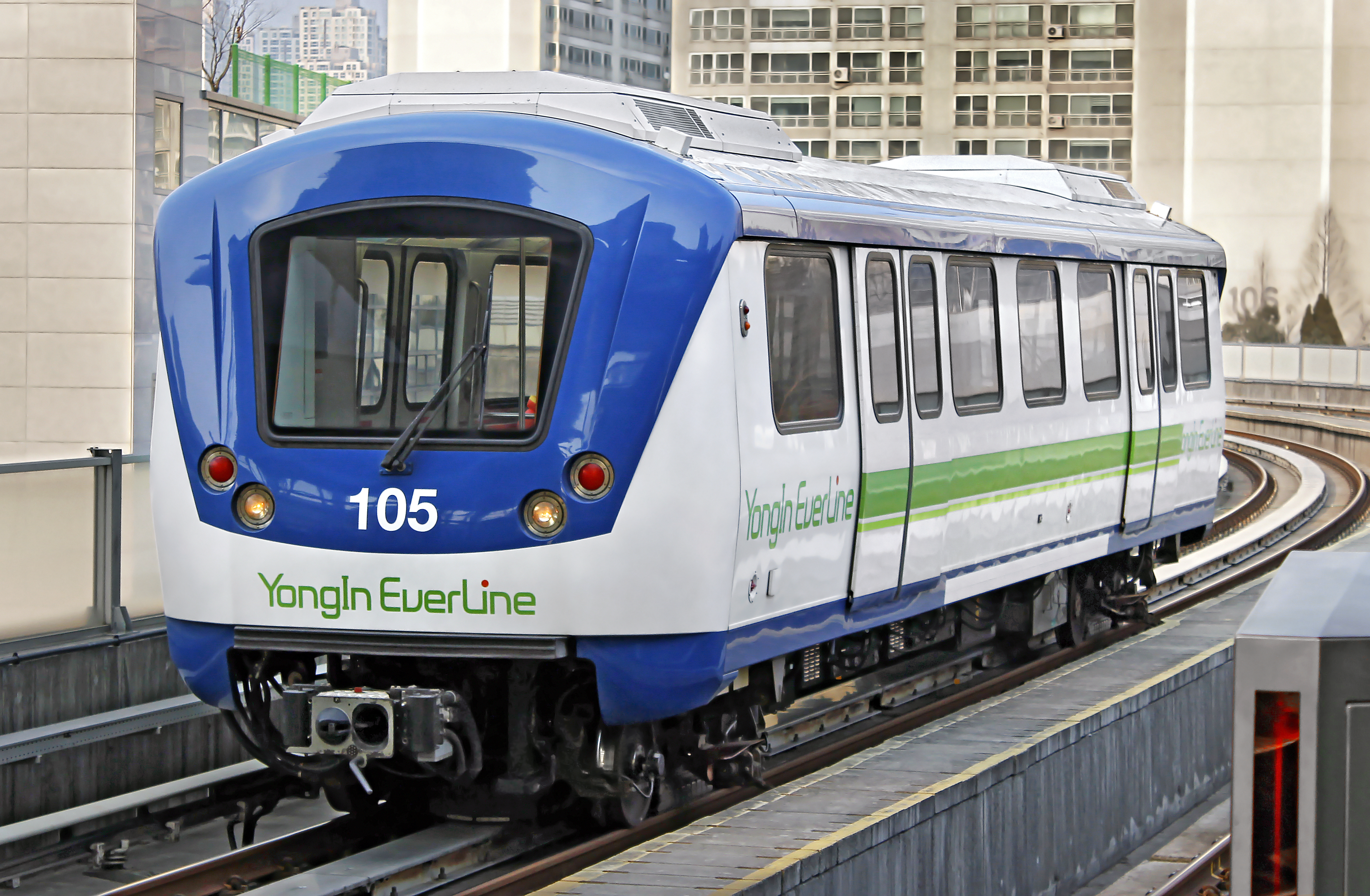
EverLine in Yongin, South Korea

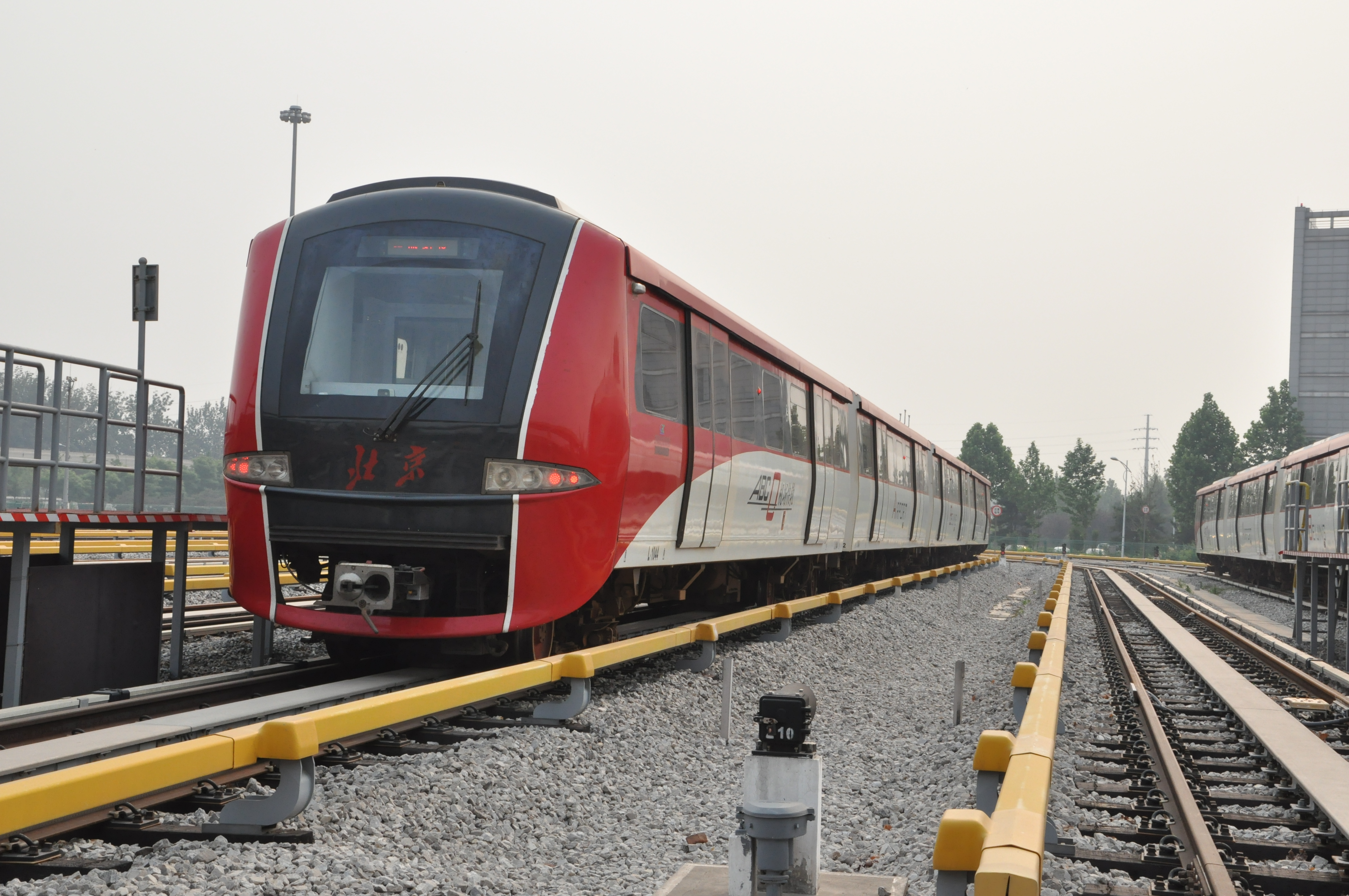
Beijing Airport Line in Beijing, China

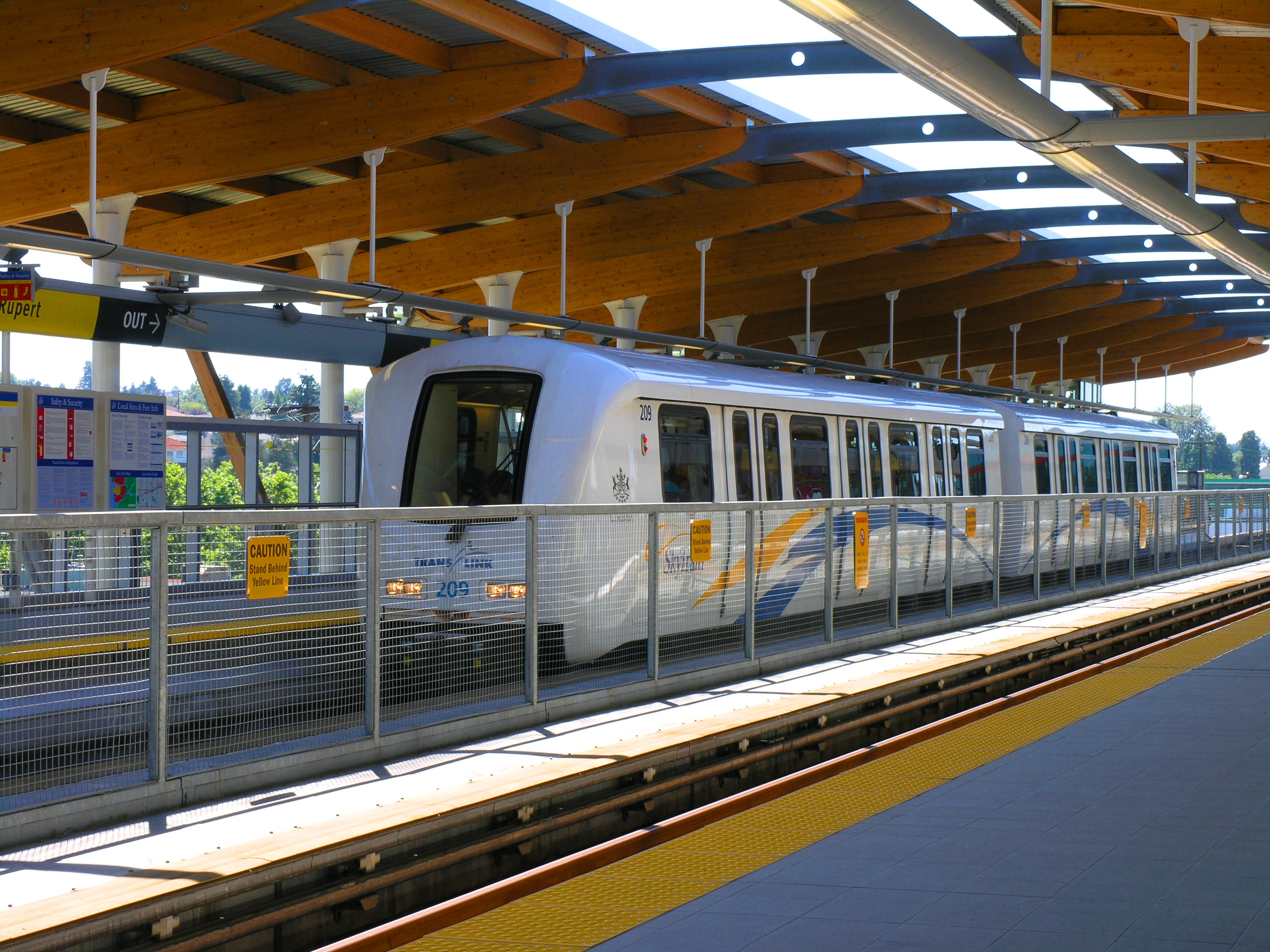
SkyTrain at Rupert station in Vancouver, Canada
Innovia Metro 300
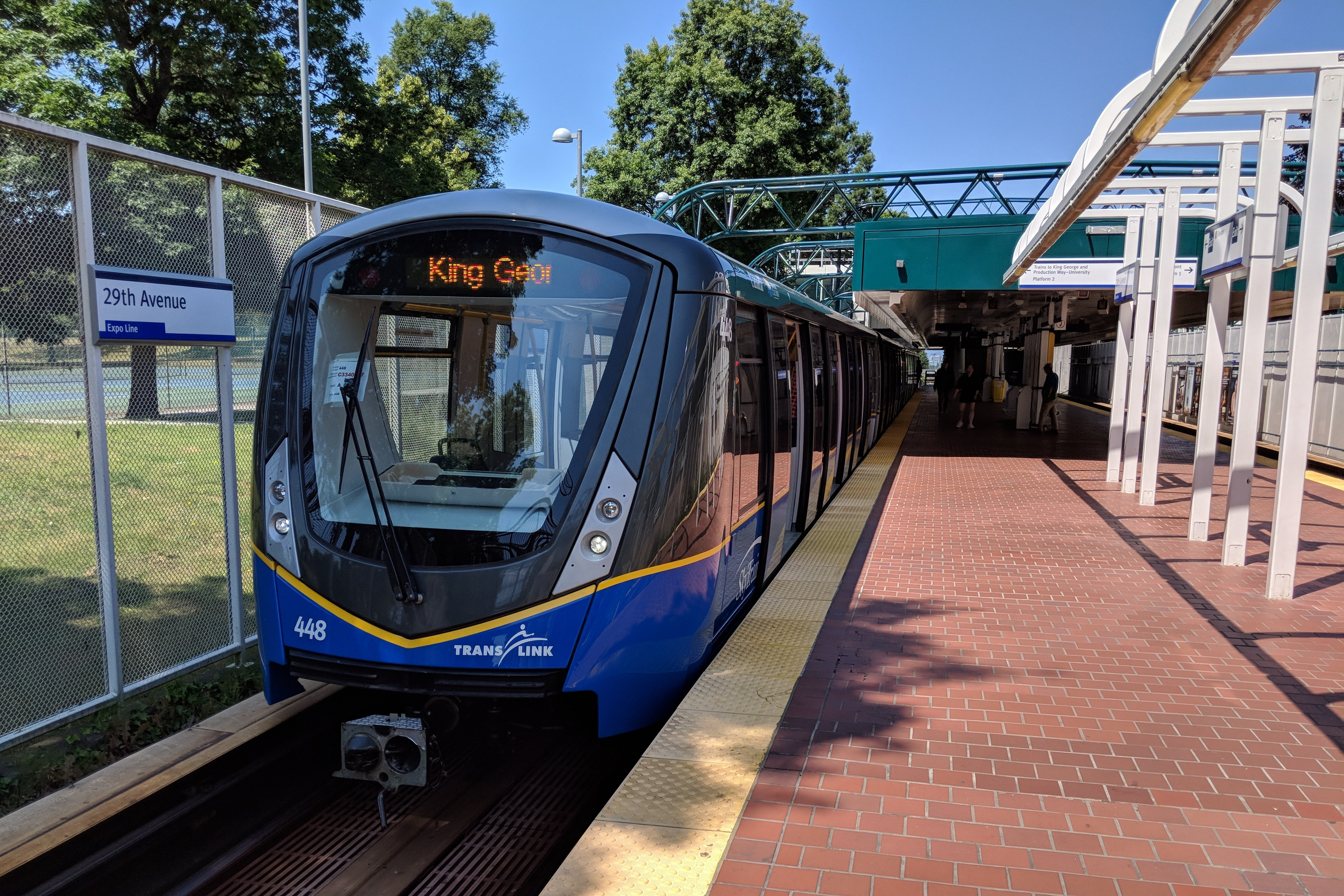
SkyTrain at 29th Avenue station in Vancouver, Canada

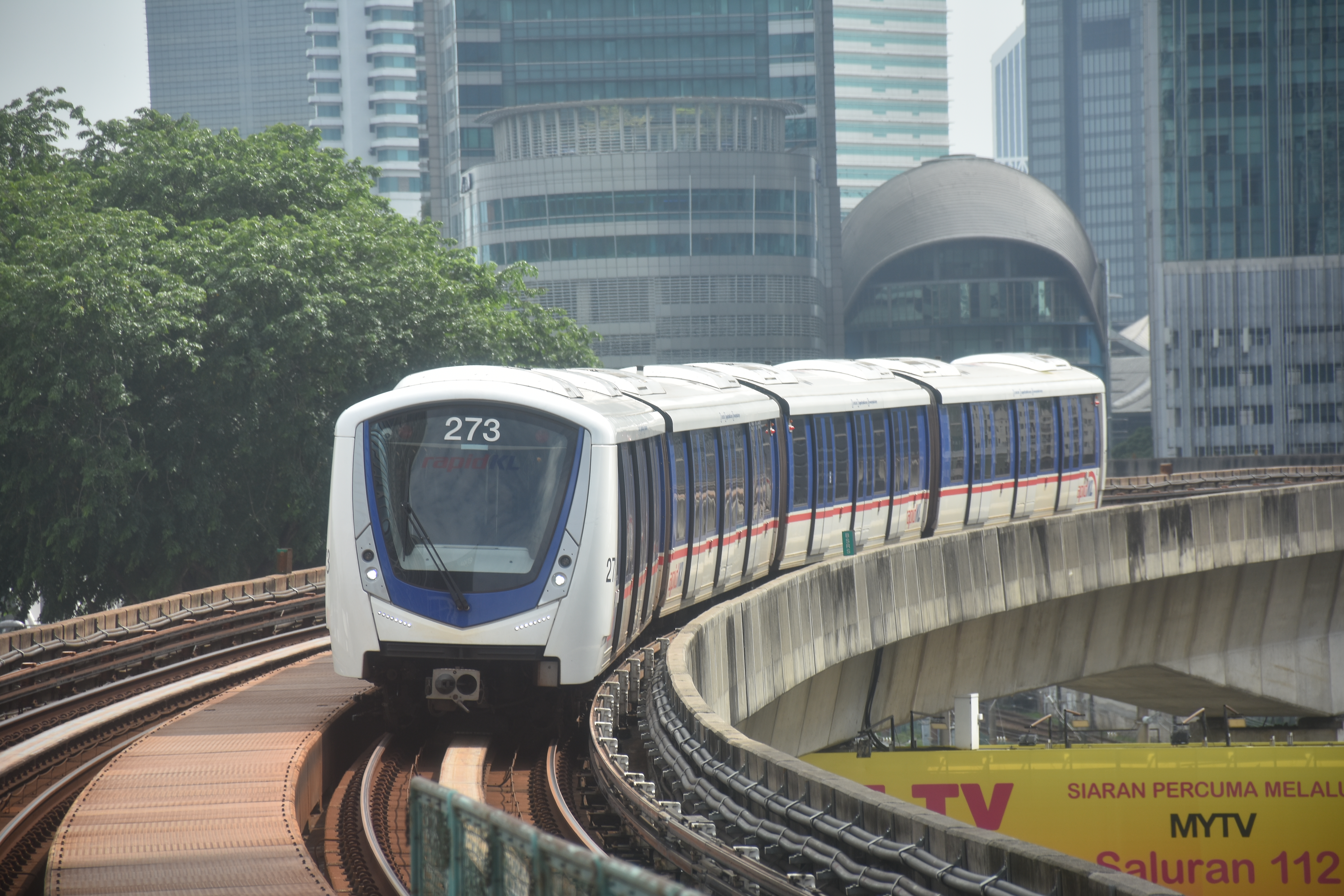
Kelana Jaya Line in Kuala Lumpur, Malaysia
Innovia Metro Mark V
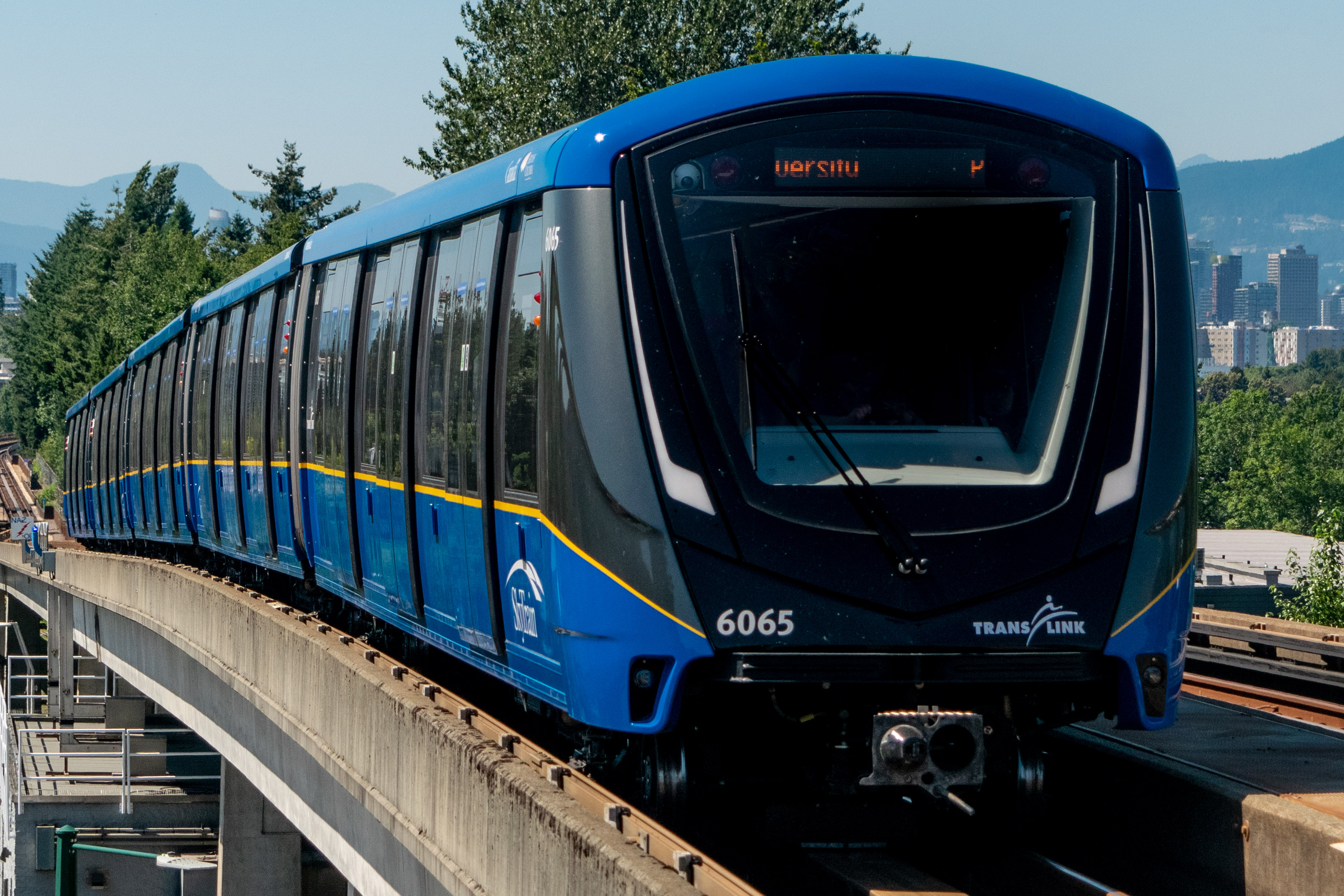
SkyTrain in Vancouver, Canada

== See also ==
- Innovia APM – automated people mover systems
- Innovia Monorail – automated monorail systems

== Bibliography ==
- Isaiah Litvak and Christopher Maule, "The Light-Rapid Comfortable (LRC) Train and the Intermediate Capacity Transit System (ICTS): Two Case Studies of Innovation in the Urban Transportation Equipment Manufacturing Industry", University of Toronto/York University Joint Program in Transportation, 1982
- Michael Smith, "TTC seeking $27 million to repair Scarborough line", Toronto Star, September 24, 1986
- John Sewell, "The Shape of the Suburbs", University of Toronto Press, 2009, ISBN 0-8020-9587-9
