= Outside My Window (disambiguation) =

"Outside My Window" is a 2010 song by Sarah Buxton.

Outside My Window may also refer to:

- Outside My Window, a 1968 book by Liesel Moak Skorpen
- Outside My Window, classical composition by Tim Hagans

== Songs ==
- "Outside My Window", a 1960 single by The Fleetwoods
- "Outside My Window", a 1980 single by Stevie Wonder from Stevie Wonder's Journey Through "The Secret Life of Plants"
- "Outside my Window", a song by Ryad Kerbouz from Legends of Laurel Canyon
- "Outside my Window", a song by Ten Years After from About Time, 1989
- "Outside My Window", a song by Euros Childs from album The Miracle Inn, 2007
- "Outside My Window", a song by Jude (singer)
- "Outside my Window", a song by Bizzy Bone and Bad Azz from Thug Pound, 2009
- "Outside My Window", a song by Luke Dalton, Zodiac Records (New Zealand)
