= Douglas Cox =

Douglas Cox may refer to:

- Douglas Cox (luthier) (born 1948), American violin maker
- Douglas Cox (American football) (1923–2011), American football player and coach
- Douglas Cox (cricketer) (1919–1982), Australian cricketer
- Douglas Cox (actor) in The Coal King
- Douglas Cox (law professor), see Riyadh the facilitator
- Douglas Cox (figure skater), see Figure skating at the Winter Universiade

== See also ==
- Doug Cox (disambiguation)
