= STC metro station =

Metro station in Riyadh, Saudi Arabia

Coordinates: 24.7268°N 46.6666°E

STC

General information
- Location: Al-Olaya, Riyadh, Saudi Arabia
- Lines: Blue Line; Red Line

Other information
- Station code: 17 (Blue Line); 15 (Red Line)

History
- Previous names: Olaya Metro Station

Services
Preceding station	Riyadh Metro	Following station
King Fahad District 2 towards SAB Bank	Line 1	Al Wurud 2 towards Ad Dar Al-Baida
At Takhassusi towards King Saud University	Line 2	Al Wurud towards King Fahd Sports City
Location

STC, formerly Olaya Metro Station, is a rapid transit station that serves the Blue and Red Lines of Riyadh Metro in the al-Olaya district of Riyadh, Saudi Arabia, located on the intersection of King Abdullah Road with King Fahad Road and Olaya Street. It covers an area of 97000 square meters.

STC station precedes the King Fahad District 2 station and succeeds Al Wurud 2 station on the Blue Line. On the Red Line, it comes before the Al Wurud station and after the At Takhassussi station.

Gerber Architekten won the competition for the metro station in 2012. Construction of the metro station began in 2014 and was slated to complete by 2019. In 2018, the Saudi Telecom Company was granted naming rights over the station and was thus renamed STC station.
