= Riyadh (disambiguation) =

Riyadh is the capital and largest city of Saudi Arabia.

Riyadh or Al-Riyadh may also refer to:

== Places ==
=== Saudi Arabia ===
- Riyad Bank
- Riyadh Province
- Riyadh Al-Khabra
- Walled town of Riyadh

=== Elsewhere ===
- El Reyad, a city in Kafr El Sheikh Governorate, Egypt
- Riyad, Mauritania, a suburb of Nouakchott, Mauritania
- Riyadh, Khartoum, an affluent neighborhood in Khartoum, Sudan

== Sports ==
- Al-Riyadh SC, a football club in Riyadh, Saudi Arabia
- Al Riyadi Amman, Jordanian professional basketball club
- Al Riyadi Club Beirut, multi-sports club based in Manara, Beirut, Lebanon

== Other uses ==
- Riad (name), people with the name also spelt as "Riyadh"
- Al-Riyadh SC (Iraq), a football club in Kirkuk, Iraq
- Al Riyadh class frigate, class of ships in the Saudi navy
- Al Riyadh (newspaper), a Saudi newspaper
- Riyadh Air, an upcoming Saudi Arabian airline
- Riyadh Metro, the longest driverless metro in the world
