= Dorsum Higazy =

Wrinkle ridge on the Moon

Dorsum Higazy is a wrinkle ridge at 28.0°N 17.0°W in Mare Imbrium on the Moon. It is 63 km long and was named after Egyptian geologist Riad Higazy in 1976.
