= Riad =

Riad or Riyad may refer to:

- Riyadh, the capital city of Saudi Arabia
- Riyad, Mauritania
- Riad (name), a given name and surname (including a list of people with the name, also Ryad, Riyad or Riyadh)
- Riad (architecture), a traditional Moroccan house or palace with an interior garden or courtyard
- Hadith Bayad wa Riyad, an Arabic love tale
- "Riad N' the Bedouins", a song by Guns N' Roses from their 2008 album Chinese Democracy
- Radiation and Isotope Applications Division, a research division of the Pakistan Institute of Nuclear Science and Technology
- ES EVM, a series of clones of IBM's System/360 and System/370 mainframes, released in the Comecon countries under the initiative of the Soviet Union since the 1960s
