= Doug Cox =

Doug Cox may refer to:

- Doug Cox (footballer) (1957–2019), Australian rules footballer
- Doug Cox (musician) (born 1962/3), Canadian multi-instrumentalist, composer and music programmer
- Doug Cox (politician) (born 1952), American politician from Oklahoma
- Doug Cox (wrestler) (born 1957), Canadian wrestler who competed at the 1986 Commonwealth Games

== See also ==
- Douglas Cox (disambiguation)
