= Al-Shabab Club Stadium =

Multi-purpose stadium in Riyadh, Saudi Arabia

SHG Arena
- Interactive map of SHG Arena
- Full name: Al-Shabab Club Stadium
- Former names: Prince Khalid bin Sultan Stadium (1984–2023)
- Location: Riyadh, Saudi Arabia
- Coordinates: 24°48′11.0808″N 46°37′43.752″E
- Owner: Ministry of Sport
- Operator: Al-Shabab Club Management
- Capacity: 13,537
- Surface: Grass
- Record attendance: 13,475 (Al-Shabab vs Al-Ahli, 11 May 2024)
- Public transit: 1 Dr Sulaiman Al-Habib Station (Note: While there is no dedicated metro station for Al-Shabab Club Stadium, fans commonly use Dr. Sulaiman Al-Habib Station on the Blue Line. The stadium is approximately 1.3 kilometers from the station, or about an 18-minute walk. Alternatively, it can be reached in around 4 minutes by bus from Exit 4. Travel times may vary depending on traffic and schedules.)

Construction
- Opened: 1984
- Renovated: 2019–2023
- Reopened: August 31, 2023
- Cost: 90 million

Tenants
- Al-Shabab (2019–present); Al-Shabab (women) (2023–2025); Al-Riyadh (2025–present): Major sporting events hosted; 2027 AFC Asian Cup (planned)

Al-Shabab Club Stadium (Arabic: ملعب نادي الشباب), branded as SHG Arena for sponsorship reasons, is a football stadium in Riyadh, Saudi Arabia. It is the home ground of Al-Shabab Club.

== History ==
The stadium was built and opened in 1984, and was mostly used by Al-Shabab as a training ground and for friendly matches.

In April 2012, the stadium underwent its first major upgrade, adding three more football pitches, administrative offices, and medical clinics.

On 2 January 2019, Al-Shabab hosted their first competitive match at the stadium against Al-Sahel in the King Cup.

On 11 January 2019, the first league match was played at the stadium, where Al-Shabab defeated Al-Fayha 4–1. The goals were scored by Nasser Al-Shamrani, Abdulmajeed Al-Sulaiheem, and Constantin Budescu (2 goals).

In July 2019, the stadium underwent further renovations to increase capacity and improve facilities. During the 2019–20 and 2020–21 seasons, it served as Al-Shabab’s primary home ground.

On 10 June 2021, the Ministry of Sport announced development plans for three smaller stadiums: Prince Khalid bin Sultan Stadium, Al-Ettifaq, and Al-Fateh Stadium.

Subsequently, on 7 September 2021, the stadium began a major redevelopment project that included the following upgrades:

- Increasing seating capacity from 10,000 to 15,000
- Removing the athletics track
- Adding a roof over the stands
- Modernizing and expanding stadium facilities

After two years of construction, the first training session at the redeveloped stadium was held on 31 August 2023.

On 9 October 2023, it was announced that the stadium would host Al-Shabab’s league match against Al-Tai on 21 October 2023. The match ended in a 2–0 win for Al-Shabab, with goals from Habib Diallo and Hussain Al-Qahtani, and was attended by 11,974 spectators.

On 15 September 2025, Al-Shabab Club and Syndicate Holding Group (SHG) announced a new sponsorship agreement for the naming rights of the club's home stadium. Under the terms of the agreement, the stadium was officially renamed SHG Arena.

== See also ==
- List of football stadiums in Saudi Arabia
