= Line 5 (Riyadh Metro) =

Metro line in Riyadh, Saudi Arabia

Green Line
- Riyadh Metro map

Overview
- Other name: Line 5
- Status: Operating
- Owner: Royal Commission for Riyadh City
- Locale: Riyadh, Saudi Arabia
- Termini: Ministry of Education; National Museum
- Stations: 12

Service
- Type: Rapid transit
- System: Riyadh Metro

History
- Opened: 15 December 2024; 13 months ago

Technical
- Line length: 12.9 kilometers (8.0 mi)
- Track gauge: 1,435 mm (4 ft 8 1/2 in)

The Green Line (Arabic: المسار الأخضر) or Line 5 is one of the six lines in the Riyadh Metro network in Riyadh, Saudi Arabia. It runs underground in a tunnel along King Abdulaziz Street, between King Abdul Aziz Historical Center and Riyadh Airbase, before connecting with King Abdullah Road. It includes 11 stations and 2 interchange stations and covers 12.9 km, between Ministry of Education and the National Museum of Saudi Arabia.

== Overview ==
It was built by a consortium of FCC, Atkins, Alstom, Samsung C&T, Strukton and TYPSA (Tecnica Y Proyectos).

== Route ==
| Code | Station Name | Interchange station to |
|---|---|---|
| 11 | Ministry of Education | Ministry of Education Red Line 18 |
| 12 | Salahaddin | |
| 13 | As Sulimaniyah | |
| 14 | Ad Dhabab | Bus Rapid Transit line King Abdulaziz 08 |
| 15 | Abu Dhabi Square | Bus Rapid Transit line King Abdulaziz 09 and Bus Community route 250 Abu Dhabi Square Interchange |
| 16 | Officers Club | Bus Community route 250 King Abdulaziz 12 |
| 17 | GOSI | |
| 18 | Al-Wizarat | |
| 19 | Ministry of Defense | |
| 20 | MEW&A | |
| 21 | Ministry of Finance | |
| 22 | National Museum | National Museum Blue Line 26 |
