= Riyadh Bus =

Transportation system in Riyadh, Saudi Arabia

Overview
- Owner: Royal Commission for Riyadh City
- Locale: Riyadh
- Transit type: Bus rapid transit
- Number of stations: 2,900+
- Website: www.rpt.sa/en/

Operation
- Began operation: 19 March 2023
- Operator: RATP Dev/SAPTCO consortium
- Number of vehicles: 800+

Technical
- System length: 1,905 km (1,183.71 mi)

Riyadh Bus (Arabic: حافلات الرياض) is a 1,905 km (1,183.71 mi) comprehensive public bus service network system in Riyadh, Saudi Arabia.

== Background ==
The King Abdulaziz Project for Riyadh Public Transport (bus and metro) began construction in 2014. The BRT system, which is part of this project, became operational in March 2023. and with the deployment of the fifth phase, there are currently 53 operational bus routes, 672 buses, and 2145 bus stops and stations. The Riyadh bus network after completion will be fully integrated with the metro network and features 86 bus routes covering 1,900 kilometers with 2,860 bus stations and stops served by 842 buses.

== Network ==
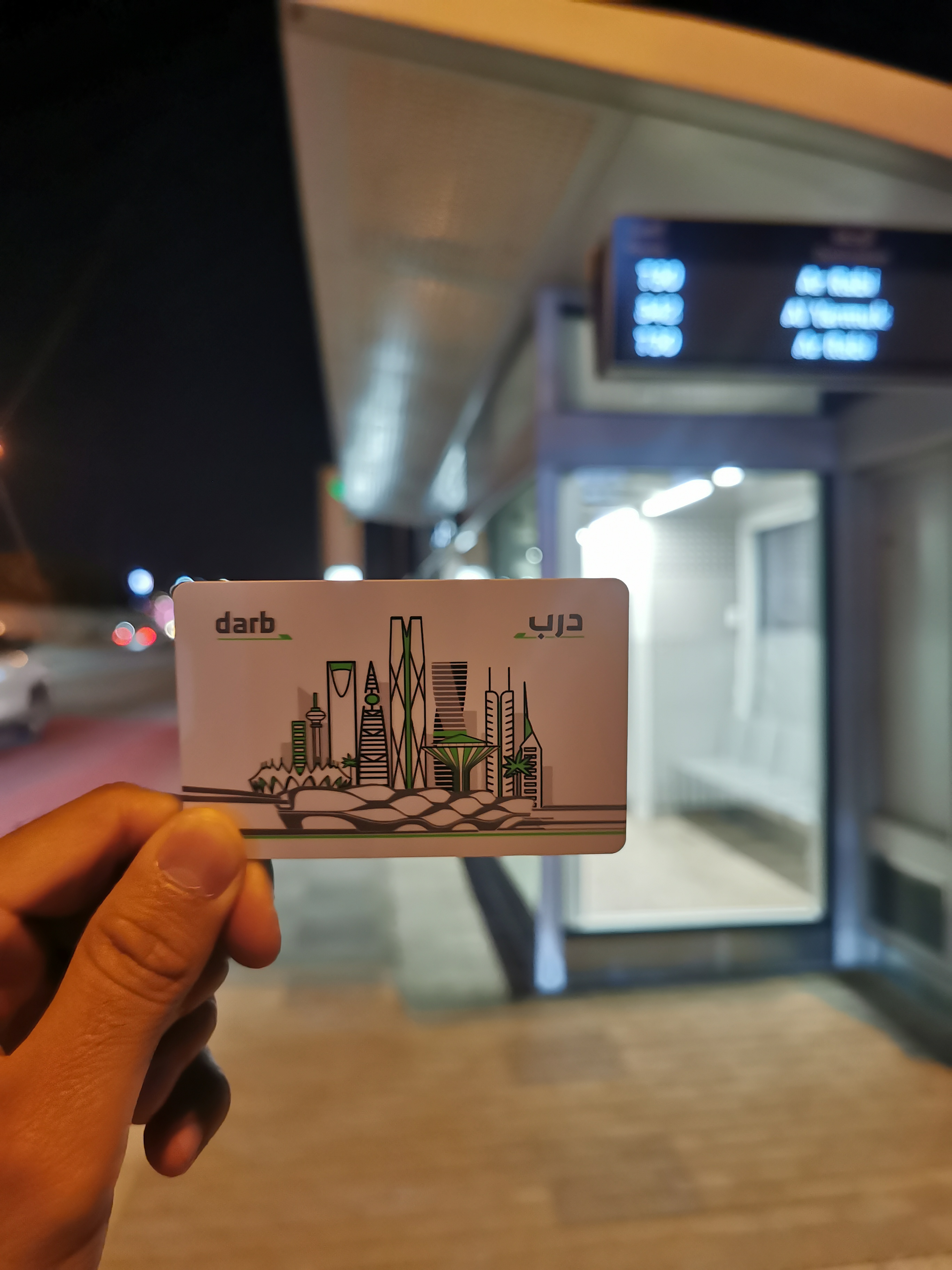
The Darb Card is an electronic fare card used for accessing the Riyadh Public Transport (RPT) network. In conjunction with the Darb mobile app, it provides a means of payment for utilizing various modes of public transportation within the city, including buses and the Riyadh Metro.

The bus Network will provide three categories:

- 3 bus rapid transit routes will provide 160 km of dedicated bus lanes serving high-capacity corridors.
- 910 km of community lines network. Consisting of 19 lines.
- 58 feeder Bus lines will provide seamless connections with metro and BRT system.
Riyadh Bus network map

== See also ==
- Riyadh Metro
