= Riad Yunes =

Dominican sports shooter (born 1928)

Riyadh Yunes Nader
Personal information
- Born: 14 September 1928 Santo Domingo, Dominican Republic
- Died: Lebanon

Sport
- Sport: Sports shooting

Riyadh Yunes Nader (born 14 September 1928, date of death unknown) was a Dominican sports shooter. He competed at the 1968 Summer Olympics and the 1972 Summer Olympics.

Yunes died in Lebanon.
