= Riad Higazy =

Egyptian Earth scientist (1919–1967)

- Born: 1919; Tanta, Egypt
- Died: 1967 (aged 47–48); Cairo, Egypt
- Education: Cairo University; University of Chicago; University of Edinburgh
- Known for: Director of the Egyptian Geological Survey
- Scientific career
- Fields: Geologist

Riad Abdel-Magid Higazy (September 13, 1919, Tanta – March 7, 1967, Cairo, Egypt) was a leading Egyptian earth scientist and geologist. He headed a number of national research agencies including director of the Egyptian Geological Survey (1956–59), president of the managing councils of the Egyptian General Agency for Mining (1961–65), the Egyptian General Agency for Geological Research and Mining (1965–67), and was briefly Deputy Minister of Industry for Mineral Wealth Affairs (1959–61). The wrinkle ridge Dorsum Higazy on the Moon is named after him.

== Academia and research ==
Higazy attended Cairo University, receiving his B.Sc. (with Honors) in 1939 and his M.Sc. in 1943. He received his Ph.D. in geology from the University of Chicago in 1948. His Ph.D. thesis was titled Petrogenesis of Perthite Pegmatites in the Btoch Hills, South Dakota. He received his D.Sc. in Geology from the University of Edinburgh in 1952. His dissertation was entitled Geo-chemical Contribulions to Problems of Petrogenes.

== Select publications ==
1949. Petrogenesis of Perthite Pegmatites in the Black Hills, South Dakota. The Journal of Geology

1952. Behaviour of the trace elements in a front of metasomatic-metamorphism in the Dalradian of Co. Donegal. Geochimica et Cosmochimica Acta.

1954. TRACE ELEMENTS OF VOLCANIC ULTRABASIC POTASSIC ROCKS OF SOUTHWESTERN UGANDA AND ADJOINING PART OF THE BELGIAN CONGO. GSA Bulletin.
