= Mohamed Riad =

Egyptian scholar and geographer (1927–2025)

Riad Ahmed Riad Mohamed Riad (Arabic: رياض احمد رياض محمد رياض; 18 September 1927 – 17 August 2025) was an Egyptian scholar and geographer. Among his books is “Journey in the time of Nubia", His original family name is Qassem Urfally.

In 1949 he obtained his B.A in Geography from Fouad I University and in 1951 he earned a Diploma of Sudanese Studies (Geography & Anthropology) from Fouad I University. In 1956 he obtained his Ph.D. degree From Voelker Kunde Institute, Vienna University. He was soon appointed a staff member at Faculty of Arts Ain Shams University, He taught at Beirut Arab University and Qatar University with the posts of lecturer, assistant professor, and professor in the Department of Geography. His wife Kawthar Abdel Rassoul participated in much of his research and books, especially in regards to field research in the Nubia area. Riad was awarded Egypt's State Appreciation Award of 2017.

Riad died on 17 August 2025, at the age of 97.

== Works ==
Riad has over 250 items of published research in basic geography and anthropology, including 17 books in Arabic, 31 papers in Arabic, 21 papers in English (in Egyptian and foreign academic bulletins and periodicals), and approximately 180 articles in Al-Ahram and Al-Masry Al-Youm (pages of opinion on Egyptian socio-economic & political questions), Al-Hilal monthly, and Al-Siyasa Al-Dawlia quarterly.

== Viewpoints and thoughts ==
- African economy, resources, development and politics.
- Middle East politics and geopolitics.
- Arab Gulf studies in urban, socio-cultural and political developments.
- Egyptian field: Bedouin and Nubian acculturation and political processes, and Egyptian agrarian problems, the overwhelming dominance of the capital city of Cairo in the web of Egyptian affairs, industry and tourism.

Riad produced criticism of major agriculture projects considering the threat of scarcity of water due to climate change, advocating for strong local governments and the creation of an industrial hub within the Suez Canal region.

== Books ==
=== In Arabic ===
- Economic geography and biogeographic production.
- Africa: A study of the continent's components.
- Cairo: the fabric of people in place and time and problems in the present and future.
- Journey in the time of Nubia: a study of the old Nuba and indicators of future development.
- The old Nubia in photos: The environment of the Nubian society and the life before displacement.
- Introduction of the book of Garf Hussein between the past and the present.
- Human: a study of race and civilization.
- General assets in geopolitics and geopolitics: with an applied study on the Middle East.
- Transport geography.
- Egypt: the texture of people, place and time.
- Polar and Nordic World: A Geographical Study.
- Translation of the book «Racial Myths» by Juan Comas.
