= Riyadh the facilitator =

Riyadh, alternately Riad, alternately Riyadh the facilitator, is a pseudonym that was given to a number of individuals who were suspected to be member of al-Qaeda. American intelligence officials and the press used the pseudonym for at least two individuals.

In an interview with National Public Radio Douglas Cox, a law Professor at City University of New York stated that one of his clients who was a Guantanamo detainee, Riyadh al-Haigh, was suspected by American intelligence officials of being Riyadh the facilitator.

Human Rights Watch continued to believe he was held in CIA custody into 2005.

According to an article published in U.S. News & World Report in May 2003 a man called Riyadh was "responsible for managing al Qaeda's affairs in Pakistan". They reported he was captured in Karachi in January 2002. They reported that he was the first senior al Qaeda member to be captured, and that his capture lead to a chain of captures that included Abu Zubaydah, Jose Padilla, Omar al Farouq, and Ramzi bin al-Shibh. Some of their findings are based on unnamed intelligence sources.
