= Ryad Kerbouz =

- Born: Kamel A. Ryad Kerbouz; 8 December 1969 (age 56); Saint Eugene, Algiers (Algeria)
- Genres: Rock, Westcoast Rock, Alternative Rock, Neofolk, Alternative Country-Rock
- Occupations: Singer; songwriter; musician
- Instruments: Vocals, guitar, bass, keyboard instruments, percussions
- Label: Indie
- Website: www.ryadkerbouz.com

Ryad Kerbouz (born Kamel A. Ryad Kerbouz, 8 December 1969) is a French-American singer-songwriter and multi-instrumentalist whose style incorporates elements of rock, folk, alt-country and indie-rock. He lives in Southern California.

== Early life ==
Born in Saint Eugene, Algiers (Algeria), Ryad Kerbouz was raised near Paris (France). He attended the Faculty of Sciences at Paris Orsay. He lived in Valencia (Spain) before moving to the United States in the early 1990s.

== From Miami to New York City ==
After an apprenticeship as a bass player for local bands in Miami, Kerbouz turned himself into a solo singer-songwriter. His first demo piqued the interest of A&R Derrick Thompson who signed him to BMG Music Publishing in New York in 1996.

Kerbouz relocated from Miami to New York City, where he worked with several other artists and producers. During that time, he performed in venues such as The Mercury Lounge, Luna Lounge and CBGB's.

In the late 1990s, Kerbouz also worked with producer DLT (Darryl Thompson), often described as the "Godfather Of New Zealand Hip Hop". The song "Liquid Skies" was released in 2000 on DLT's Album Altruism.

== London – This Side of the Truth ==
Kerbouz later went on to sign a deal as a solo recording artist with Riverhorse Records (Sony Music). Riverhorse Records was set up as a joint venture between Robin Godfrey-Cass and Sony Independent Network Europe (SINE) in early 1998.

Kerbouz moved to London and started working on his first album thus collaborating with some of the UK's best musicians and producers.

This Side of the Truth was recorded in the fall of 1999 at Metropolis Studios in London and Great Linford Manor Studios in Milton Keynes.

With the release of his solo debut album imminent, a showcase at the legendary club Ronnie Scott's and a tour throughout the UK about to start, the label unfortunately disbanded.

Kerbouz relocated back to Paris (France), re-emerging with a new sound heavily influenced by his journeys throughout California. The experience prompted him to return to the United States, where he currently lives.

== Los Angeles – Legends of Laurel Canyon ==
In the fall of 2012, Kerbouz provided much of the original music used throughout the EYE ON L.A.'s one-hour special The Legends of Laurel Canyon, which aired on KABC-TV, Los Angeles. A documentary featuring the music of The Byrds, Love, Buffalo Springfield, The Doors, Jimi Hendrix, The Monkees, The Mamas & the Papas, Crosby Stills Nash and Young, Joni Mitchell, Frank Zappa.

Earlier that year, Kerbouz was invited by Georges Lang, a pillar of French media for 40 years and a high-profile personality on RTL (French radio) since the early 1970s, to celebrate the 39th anniversary of his radio show Les Nocturnes. The show was recorded in San Francisco with guests James Taylor, Christopher Cross, Jonathan Wilson, Chris Isaak, Joan Osborne, Jason Mraz, Sara Watkins. Kerbouz performed "Outside my Window", a song from his album Legends of Laurel Canyon. The title track of the album entered Les Nocturnes PlayList and became PowerPlay on its first week.
