= Line 2 (Riyadh Metro) =

Metro line in Riyadh, Saudi Arabia

Red Line
- Riyadh Metro map

Overview
- Other name: Line 2
- Status: Operating
- Owner: Royal Commission for Riyadh City
- Locale: Riyadh, Saudi Arabia
- Termini: King Saud University; King Fahad Stadium
- Stations: 15

Service
- Type: Rapid transit
- System: Riyadh Metro

History
- Opened: 15 December 2024; 15 months ago

Technical
- Line length: 25.3 kilometers (15.7 mi)
- Track gauge: 1,435 mm (4 ft 8 1/2 in)

The Red Line (Arabic: المسار الأحمر) or Line 2 is one of the six lines in the Riyadh Metro network in Riyadh, Saudi Arabia. It runs east–west along King Abdullah Road, between King Saud University and King Fahd Sports City. The line travels on an elevated strip in the median of a planned freeway. There are 15 stations and 3 interchange stations on the line, covering 25.3 km.

== Overview ==
It was built and designed by consortium of Bechtel, Almabani, CCC and Siemens.

== Route ==
Code	Station Name	Interchange station to
11	King Saud University Station	King Saud University; King Saud University Stadium
12	King Salman Oasis	Community Bus route Purple Line 680 and Blue Line 730 King Abdulaziz 05
13	KACST	
14	At Takhassusi	King Abdullah 09
15	STC	STC Blue Line 15
16	Al-Wurud	
17	King Abdulaziz Road	Bus Rapid Transit line King Abdulaziz 05
18	Ministry of Education	Ministry of Education Green Line 11
19	An Nuzhah	
20	Riyadh Exhibition Center	
21	Khalid Bin Alwaleed Road	Khalid Bin Alwaleed road interchange to BRT Bus network
22	Al-Hamra	Al-Hamra Purple Line 17
23	Al-Khaleej	King Abdullah 16
24	City Centre Ishbiliyah	
25	King Fahd Sports City Station	King Fahd Sports City
