= Line 3 (Riyadh Metro) =

Metro line in Riyadh, Saudi Arabia

Orange Line
- Riyadh Metro map

Overview
- Other name: Line 3
- Status: Operating
- Owner: Royal Commission for Riyadh City
- Locale: Riyadh, Saudi Arabia
- Termini: Jeddah Road; Khashm Al An
- Stations: 22

Service
- Type: Rapid transit
- System: Riyadh Metro

History
- Opened: 5 January 2025; 12 months ago

Technical
- Line length: 40.7 kilometers (25.3 mi)
- Track gauge: 1,435 mm (4 ft 8 1/2 in)

The Orange Line (Arabic: المسار البرتقالي) or Line 3 is one of the six lines in the Riyadh Metro network in Riyadh, Saudi Arabia. It runs east–west along Al-Madinah Al-Munawwarah Road and Prince Saad Bin Abdulrahman Al-Awal Road, starting in the west near Jeddah Expressway and ending in the east near the National Guard camp of Khashm Al-An. It has 21 stations and 2 interchange stations, covering 40.7 km.

== Overview ==
It is mostly elevated along the western part of Al-Madinah Al-Munawwarah Road, then underground in tunnels in the central section, and generally at grade along Prince Saad Bin Abdulrahman Road.

It was built by ArRiyadh New Mobility Consortium, a consortium of Webuild (at the time of signature), Impregilo, Bombardier, Ansaldo, Larsen & Toubro, Nesma & Partners, WorleyParsons.

== Route ==
Code	Station Name	Interchange station to
11(3A1)	Jeddah Road	
12(3A2)	Tuwaiq	
13(3B1)	Ad Douh	
14(3B2)	Western Station	Western Station Interchange Bus Rapid Transit line 12 and Western Station Interchange Community Bus route Blue Line 730
15(3C2)	Aishah bint Abi Bakr Street	Madina Munwarah Community Bus route Green Line 11
16(3D3)	Dhahrat Al-Badiah	Madina Munwarah Community Bus route Green Line 13
17(3D1)	Sultanah	Madina Munwarah Community Bus route Purple Line 15
18(3D2)	Al-Jarradiyah	Madina Munwarah Community Bus route Purple Line 17
19(3E1)	Courts Complex	
20(3E2)	Qasr Al-Hokm	Qasr Al-Hokm Blue Line 28
21(3E3)	Al-Hilla	
22(3E4)	Al-Margab	
23(3E5)	As Salhiyah	
24(3E6)	First Industrial City	
25(3F1)	Railway Station	Dammam–Riyadh line
26(3F2)	Al-Malaz	Salahuddin Al Ayubi Bus Rapid Transit line 16
27(3G1)	Jarir District	
28(3G2)	Al-Rajhi Grand Mosque	
29(3H1)	Harun Ar Rashid Road	
30(3J1)	An Naseem	An Naseem 21 Purple Line and An Nassem Interchange 12
31(3J2)	Hassan Bin Thabit Street	Bus Community route 540 Blue Line As-Saadah 05
32(3K1)	Khashm Al-An	
