= Riyadh Metro =

Rapid transit system in Riyadh, Saudi Arabia

Riyadh Metro قطار الرياض

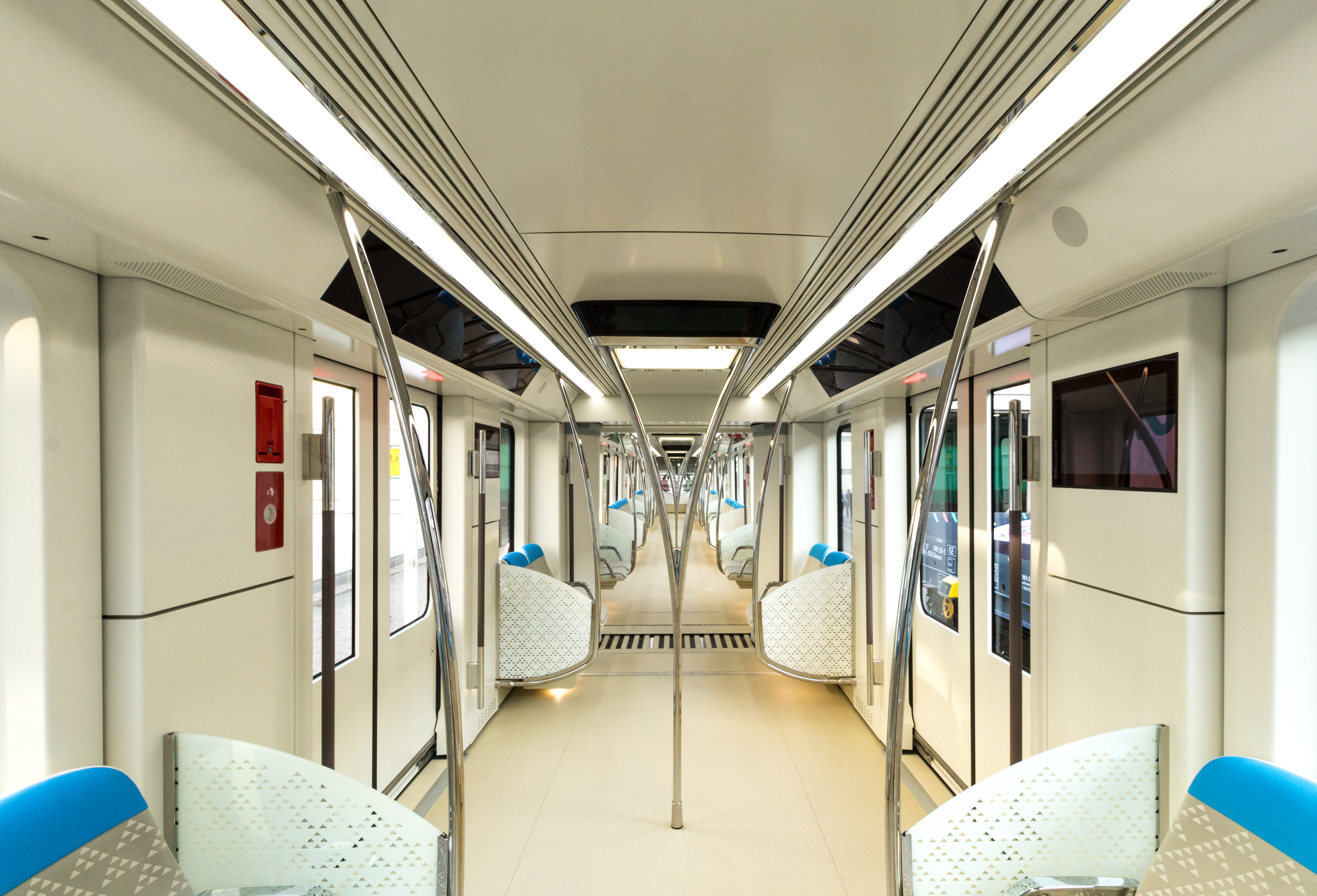
- Metro Interior KAFD Station

Overview
- Native name: قطار الرياض
- Owner: Riyadh City Royal Commission
- Locale: Riyadh, Saudi Arabia
- Transit type: Rapid Transit
- Number of lines: 6
- Line number: 1 2 3 4 5 6
- Number of stations: 85
- Website: rpt.sa/en/

Operation
- Began operation: 1 December 2024; 23 months ago
- Character: Elevated and underground
- Number of vehicles: 586 cars
- Train length: 2–4 coaches
- Headway: 3 to 7 minutes

Technical
- System length: 176 km (109 mi)
- Track gauge: 1,435 mm (4 ft 8 1/2 in) standard gauge

The Riyadh Metro (Note: Arabic: قطار الرياض (romanized: Qiṭār ar-Riyāḍ)) is a rapid transit system serving Riyadh, the capital of Saudi Arabia. Part of the King Abdulaziz Project for Riyadh Public Transport, it is the longest fully automated, driverless metro in the world.

The system consists of six lines connecting 85 stations spanning a combined length of 176 kilometres (109 mi). This is the second metro system in Saudi Arabia, after the Sacred Sites Metro Line in Mecca, the fourth on the Arabian Peninsula, sixth in the Arab World, and fifteenth in the Middle East. The project cost $22.5 billion to build. It was opened on December 1, 2024.

== History ==
In June 2013, a shortlist of three major global consortia was chosen to build the metro. Contracts were awarded in July 2013, with construction planned to start in 2014 and take four years. The groundbreaking ceremony was celebrated on 4 April 2014. The project was originally led by Sattam bin Abdulaziz, former governor of Riyadh and chairman of the Riyadh Development Authority, and is now led by Faisal bin Bandar, the current governor of Riyadh.

The project was expected to be the centerpiece of the city's public transport system, integrated with an 85-kilometre (53 mi) three-line bus rapid transit (BRT) network (Riyadh Bus). The project was expected to reduce car trips by nearly 250 thousand trips per day, equivalent to 400 thousand liters of fuel per day, thus reducing air pollutant emissions in the city. The metro's capacity was expected to reach 3.6 million passengers per day.

=== Construction ===
The six lines were built by three consortiums.

- BACS (a consortium of Bechtel, Almabani, CCC and Siemens) which built Line 1 and Line 2.
- Arriyadh New Mobility (ANM) (a consortium of Webuild (at the time of signature, Impregilo, then Salini-Impregilo), Bombardier, Ansaldo, Larsen & Toubro, Nesma & Partners, WorleyParsons and IDOM) which built Line 3.
- FAST (a consortium of FCC, Atkins, Alstom, Samsung C&T, Strukton and TYPSA (Tecnica Y Proyectos)) which built Line 4, Line 5 and Line 6.

In 2017, Turki bin Abdullah was arrested as part of the 2017–2019 Saudi Arabian purge. Part of the allegations against him was that he, as Riyadh Governor, had awarded contracts for the Riyadh Metro to his own companies.

In February 2018, Riyadh governor Faisal bin Bandar stated that 68% of the project had been finished and that the metro would start demo runs in late September 2018. In March 2018, the Saudi economy minister Mohammad Al Tuwaijri commented at the Saudi-UK CIO Forum in London that a soft opening was planned for 2019 (June–August) and the full availability of the system was expected in 2021. In December 2021, it was announced that more than 90% of the project had been completed, with testing well underway.

=== Opening ===
The Riyadh Metro was inaugurated by King Salman on 27 November 2024. The opening of the metro system – featuring Lines 1, 4, and 6 – took place on 1 December 2024. Lines 2 and 5 were opened two weeks later on 15 December, with the final line – Line 3 – opening on 5 January 2025. On 11 December 2024, it was reported that the metro had garnered 1.9 million passengers in the first week of operation. By early January 2025, the metro system was confirmed to be fully operational after the launch of the Orange Line (Line 3).

In 2025, the Riyadh Metro was recognized by Guinness World Records as the world's longest fully automated, driverless metro network, spanning 176 kilometres (109 mi) with six lines and 85 stations.

=== Incidents and accidents ===
Just six days after the Riyadh Metro opened, the Blue Line faced some technical issues after someone tampered with the emergency switch on the train, causing the line to halt between STC and Alinma Bank Stations. Shuttle buses were deployed between the two to avoid further disruption.

In November 2025, the Riyadh Metro had to halt its operations on five eastern stations on the Red Line, due to some technical issues. Shuttle buses were deployed between the stations to avoid further disruption.

== Lines ==
Riyadh Metro diagram

The Riyadh Metro consists of six lines, each assigned a unique color and number, and spans 176 kilometres (109 mi).

Number	Line name	Line length	No. of stations	Termini
1	Blue Line	38 km (24 mi)	25	SAB Bank ↔ Ad Dar Al-Baida
2	Red Line	25.3 km (15.7 mi)	15	King Saud University ↔ King Fahd Sports City
3	Orange Line	40.7 km (25.3 mi)	22	Jeddah Road ↔ Khashm Al-An
4	Yellow Line	29.6 km (18.4 mi)	9	KAFD ↔ Airport T1-2
5	Green Line	12.9 km (8.0 mi)	12	Ministry of Education ↔ National Museum
6	Purple Line	29.9 km (18.6 mi)	11	KAFD ↔ An Naseem

== Future ==
In a podcast the head of the Riyadh Metro stated that there are future plans for the expansion of the Riyadh Metro towards Khuzam and Fursan Suburbs, Badr and Shafa District.

=== Line 7 ===
Line 7 is a proposed line set to link all King Khalid International Airport terminals down to Qiddiya City, the line will pass through MiSK City, New Muraaba, Diriyah and King Abdullah Gardens.

=== Expansion of Line 2 ===
A proposed expansion to Line 2 is to cover the western side of King Saud University, possibly the Diplomatic Quarter and end it at Diriyah.

== Stations ==
The system consists of 85 stations, including a number of interchange stations. Naming rights for 15 out of the 85 stations are planned to be awarded by the Royal Commission for Riyadh City. These rights include space for shops and advertising within the stations.

The vehicles and stations are monitored by cameras, early warning systems, and communication systems that are directly connected to the main control center. The main stations are characterized by monorail sites designed in several levels. These sites are air-conditioned, taking into account the comfort and safety of passengers. The stations also use solar cells technology to save about 20% of the power required for air-conditioning and lighting.

=== KAFD Metro Station ===
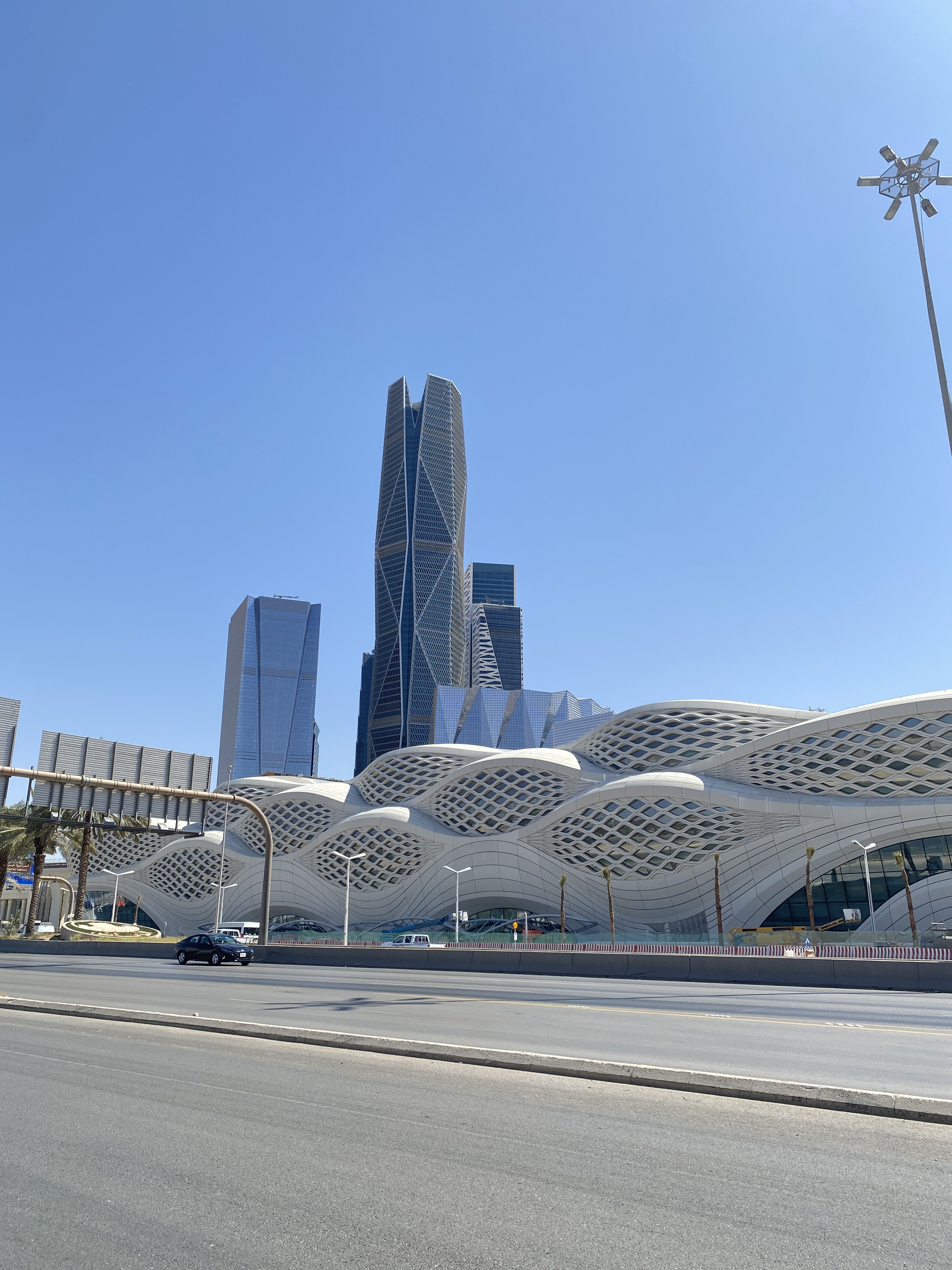
KAFD station with the Financial District in the background

The KAFD (King Abdullah Financial District) station covers an area of 8,150 m^{2} (87,700 sq ft). The station is located east of the Financial District, along King Fahd Road near its intersection with the Northern Ring Road. It connects Lines 1, 4, 6, and the KAFD's monorail. The station is designed by Zaha Hadid Architects.

=== National Museum Station ===
National Museum Station is the second largest and one of the most iconic stations on the Riyadh Metro. As one of the four transfer stations on Line 1, National Museum Station is where Line 1 and Line 5 meet. The station is located in the Al Batha area of Riyadh. The gross floor area (GFA) of the station itself is about 72,000 m^{2}. The station's external envelope is designed to replicate Saudi Arabia's mountainous region, with a unique double skin facade, internal blue panels replicating the sky and external concrete panels through which the blue can be seen, to represent the mountains. The station is unique in that it also has a new bus terminal adjacent, the design of which is to replicate a Bedouin tent.

=== STC Station ===
STC Metro station is one of the four main transportation stations in the Riyadh Metro. Gerber Architekten won the competition for the metro station in 2012. It was originally planned to be named Olaya Metro station. Construction started in 2014 and was planned to be completed in 2019. This station allows access for Line 1 and Line 2 trains. The gross floor area (GFA) is about 97,000 m^{2} (1,040,000 sq ft). It is located on the intersection of King Abdullah Road with King Fahad Road and Olaya Street. Its design proposes the idea of Public gardens that extend over the entire area of the station. Metro customers are invited to use the public gardens. The gardens are characterized by palm trees erected on top of the station, designated picnic areas, and WiFi coverage. Stairs, lifts, and escalators connect all the levels allowing access to everyone including people with special needs. There is also a public parking located underneath the plaza. Recently the initial plan has been changed and no longer features gardens on the roof and is now rectangular in shape though it still has all the other features. In 2018, the station was named STC station after the Saudi Telecom Company.

=== Western Metro Station ===
The station covers an area of 12,500 m^{2} (135,000 sq ft). The station is located on the land currently used for the Central Vegetable Market of Al-Suwaidi Al-Gharbi. The station will be composed of a bus route and a link to Line 3. Omrania & Associates has won the competition to design the western metro station.

=== Qasr Al-Hukm Metro Station ===
This station covers an area of 19,600 m^{2} (211,000 sq ft) and connects Line 1 and Line 3 trains. Snøhetta from Norway had won the competition to design the Qasr Al-Hokm Metro Station.

== Infrastructure ==
=== Rolling stock ===
Three separate rolling stock manufacturers built trainsets for the Metro, albeit to a similar industrial design. Trains are split into three classes – first, family, and single class – separated by glass partitions.

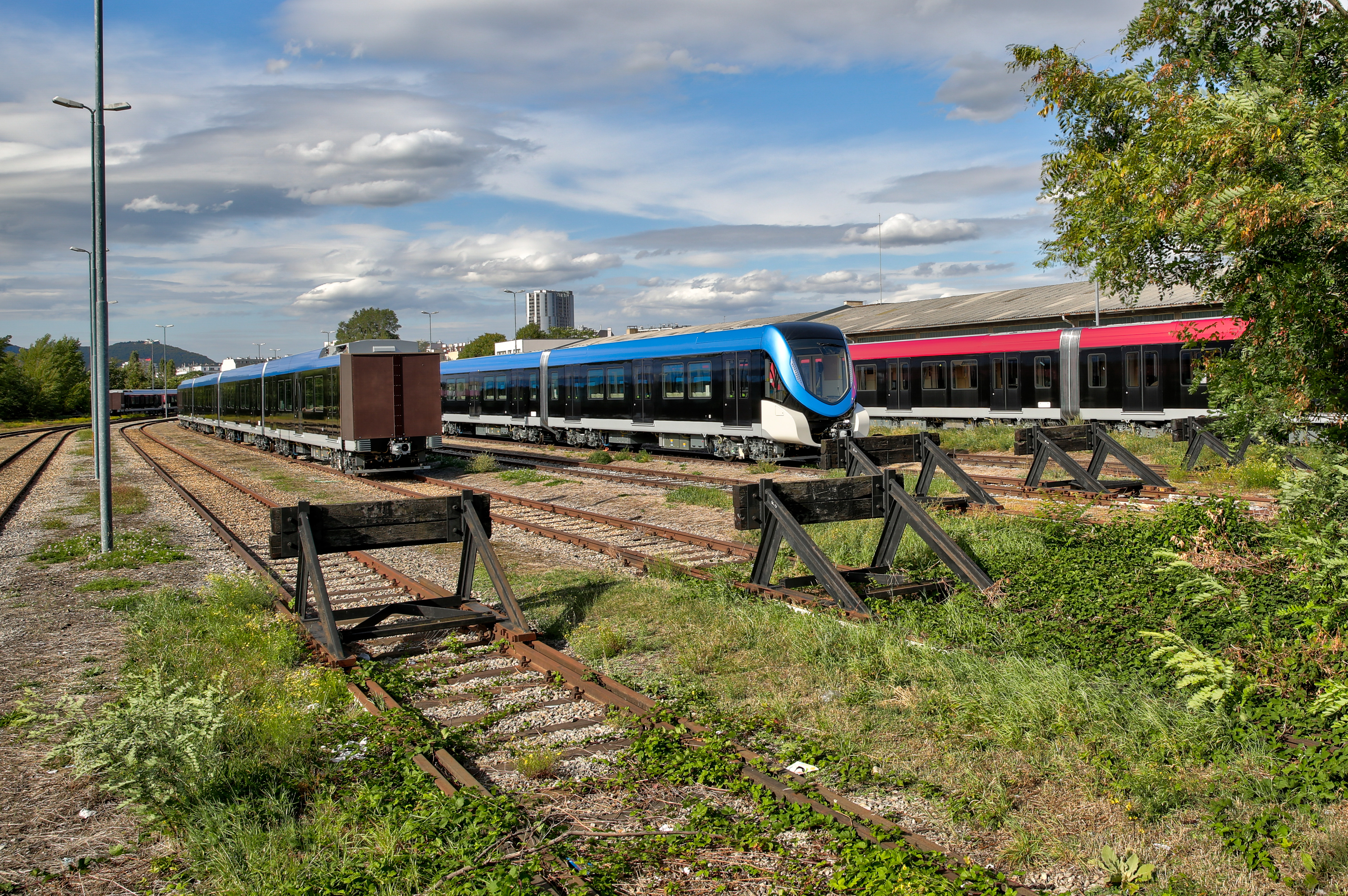
Riyadh Metro Blue Line and Red Line train at the Northwest Railway Station in Brigittenau, Vienna, Austria

- Siemens supplied 45 4-car Inspiro trainsets for Line 1 and 29 2-car sets for Line 2. The first was unveiled in Vienna on 23 February 2016.
- Bombardier (later Alstom) supplied 47 two-car Innovia Metro 300 trainsets for Line 3.
- Alstom supplied 69 Metropolis trainsets for Lines 4, 5 and 6 of the Riyadh Metro. The first trainset was handed over to the ADA in March 2017. Each trainset is 36 meters long and can accommodate a maximum of 231 passengers.

Line Code	Line Name	Consortium	Formation & Number built	EMU/Fleet	Manufacturers
1	Blue Line	BACS	45 four-car trainsets (180 cars)	Inspiro	Siemens
2	Red Line	BACS	29 two-car trainsets (58 cars)	Inspiro	Siemens
3	Orange Line	ANM	47 two-car trainsets (94 cars)	Innovia Metro 300	Bombardier/Alstom
4	Yellow Line	FAST	69 two-car trainsets (138 cars)	Metropolis	Alstom
5	Green Line	FAST	69 two-car trainsets (138 cars)	Metropolis	Alstom
6	Purple Line	FAST	69 two-car trainsets (138 cars)	Metropolis	Alstom

== See also ==
- Transport in Saudi Arabia
- Rail transport in Saudi Arabia
- Sacred Sites Metro Line
- Haramain High Speed Railway
- Riyadh Bus
- Medina Metro
- Jeddah Metro
- Mecca Metro
- Sharqia Metro
