= Public Investment Fund Tower =

Skyscraper in Riyadh, Saudi Arabia

- برج صندوق الاستثمارات العامة
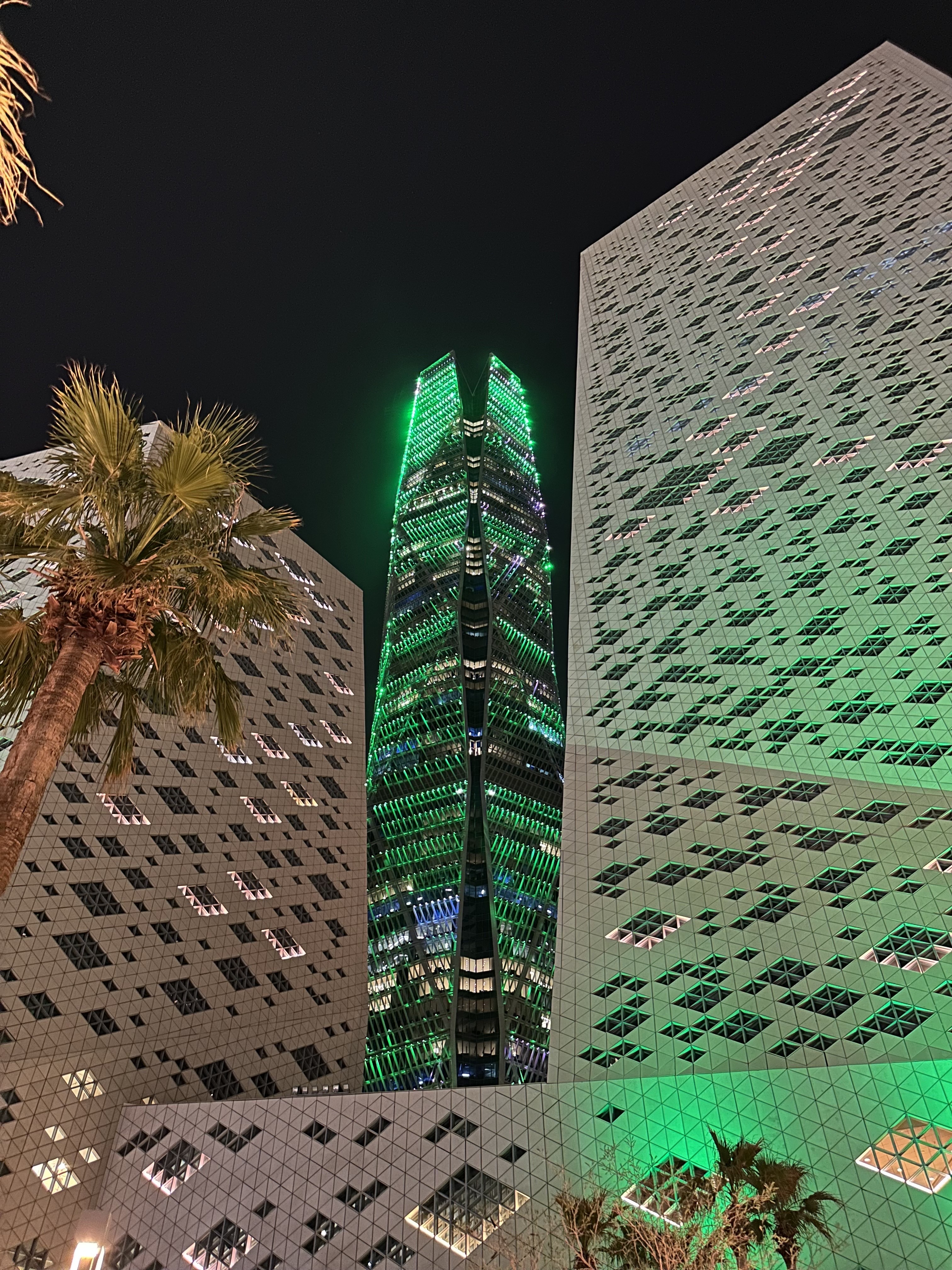
- The Public Investment Fund Tower in 2024
- Former names: Capital Market Authority Tower

General information
- Status: Completed
- Type: Supertall skyscraper
- Location: King Abdullah Financial District, Riyadh
- Coordinates: 24.7628°N 46.6403°E
- Construction started: 2010
- Topped-out: 2014
- Completed: 2021
- Cost: SAR3.7 billion (US$1 billion)
- Owner: Public Investment Fund

Height
- Height: 385 m (1,263 ft)

Technical details
- Floor count: 80
- Floor area: 182,137 m^{2} (1,960,510 sq ft)
- Lifts/elevators: 40

Design and construction
- Architecture firm: HOK; Omrania
- Main contractor: Saudi Binladin Group

Other information
- Public transit: 1 4 6 KAFD metro station

The Public Investment Fund Tower is a 385 m (1,263 ft) supertall skyscraper in Riyadh, Saudi Arabia. Completed in 2021, the 80-story tower is the tallest building in Riyadh and the second-tallest in Saudi Arabia, surpassing the Burj Rafal. Designed by the architectural firms HOK and Omrania, it serves as the centerpiece of the King Abdullah Financial District.

The Tower is headquarters of the Public Investment Fund, the sovereign wealth fund of Saudi Arabia.

On 19 November 2026, a Houthi missile attack damaged at least five of the tower's floors.

== Overview ==
Construction of the PIF Tower began in 2010 and reached its full height in 2014, with final completion occurring in 2021. The tower is recognized as one of the most technologically advanced skyscrapers in the world and plays a central role in Riyadh's emerging financial district.

The building is aiming for LEED Gold certification and includes an observation deck, a two-story atrium, and double-height sky lobbies. It features the ThyssenKrupp TWIN elevator system with two cabs operating within a single shaft, as well as amenities such as a fitness center, swimming pool, and cafeteria.

== See also ==
- KAFD metro station
- Public Investment Fund
- King Abdullah Financial District
- List of tallest buildings in Saudi Arabia
