= King Abdullah Financial District =

Saudi Arabia's main financial district

King Abdullah Financial District (KAFD)
- Native name: مركز الملك عبدالله المالي
- Industry: Financial centre • Smart city • Business district • Mixed-use development
- Founded: 8 March 2007; 19 years ago
- Founder: Saudi Pension Authority
- Headquarters: Riyadh
- Key people: Aiman Al-Mudaifer (Chairman); Mohammed Al-Sudairi (CEO)
- Owner: Public Investment Fund
- Website: www.kafd.sa/en

King Abdullah Financial District (KAFD) (Note: Arabic: مركز الملك عبد الله المالي (romanized: Markaz al-Malik ʿAbd Allāh al-Mālī)) or simply Al-Maliyyah (Note: Arabic: المالية) is a major mixed-use financial district located in the Al-Aqeeq neighbourhood of Riyadh, Saudi Arabia. It serves as the country's financial centre and a central hub for banking, investment, and professional services.

The district is managed by the King Abdullah Financial District Development and Management Company (KAFD DMC), a wholly owned subsidiary of the Public Investment Fund. It was previously managed by the Raidah Investment Company on behalf of the national pension authority.

== Structure ==
The King Abdullah Financial District (KAFD) consists of 95 buildings, including office towers, residential structures, hotels, and entertainment facilities, covering approximately 1.6 million square meters. It is managed by the King Abdullah Financial District Development and Management Company, a subsidiary of the Public Investment Fund (PIF), and is the largest LEED Platinum-certified mixed-use district in the world.

In 2025, KAFD became the first financial district globally to achieve Platinum certification under the ModeScore Communities standard, recognizing its integrated, low-emission mobility and urban planning. The district's hospitality sector expanded in late 2025 through an agreement with Hilton Hotels & Resorts to operate a 450-room flagship hotel.

The master plan was overseen by Henning Larsen Architects, with individual towers designed by international firms including HOK, Omrania, SOM, Gensler, and Foster + Partners. The district's transit infrastructure is anchored by the KAFD metro station, designed by Zaha Hadid Architects, which became operational in late 2024. An internal 3.6 km driverless monorail with six stations is currently under development, with public operations scheduled for 2027.

A 9.6-mile network of climate-controlled skywalks connects the district's buildings, the longest continuous network of skyways in the world. As of 2026, KAFD hosts more than 140 office tenants and over 75 regional headquarters for multinational companies, serving as a central hub for business, residential, and public activities in Riyadh.

== Transportation ==
=== Metro ===
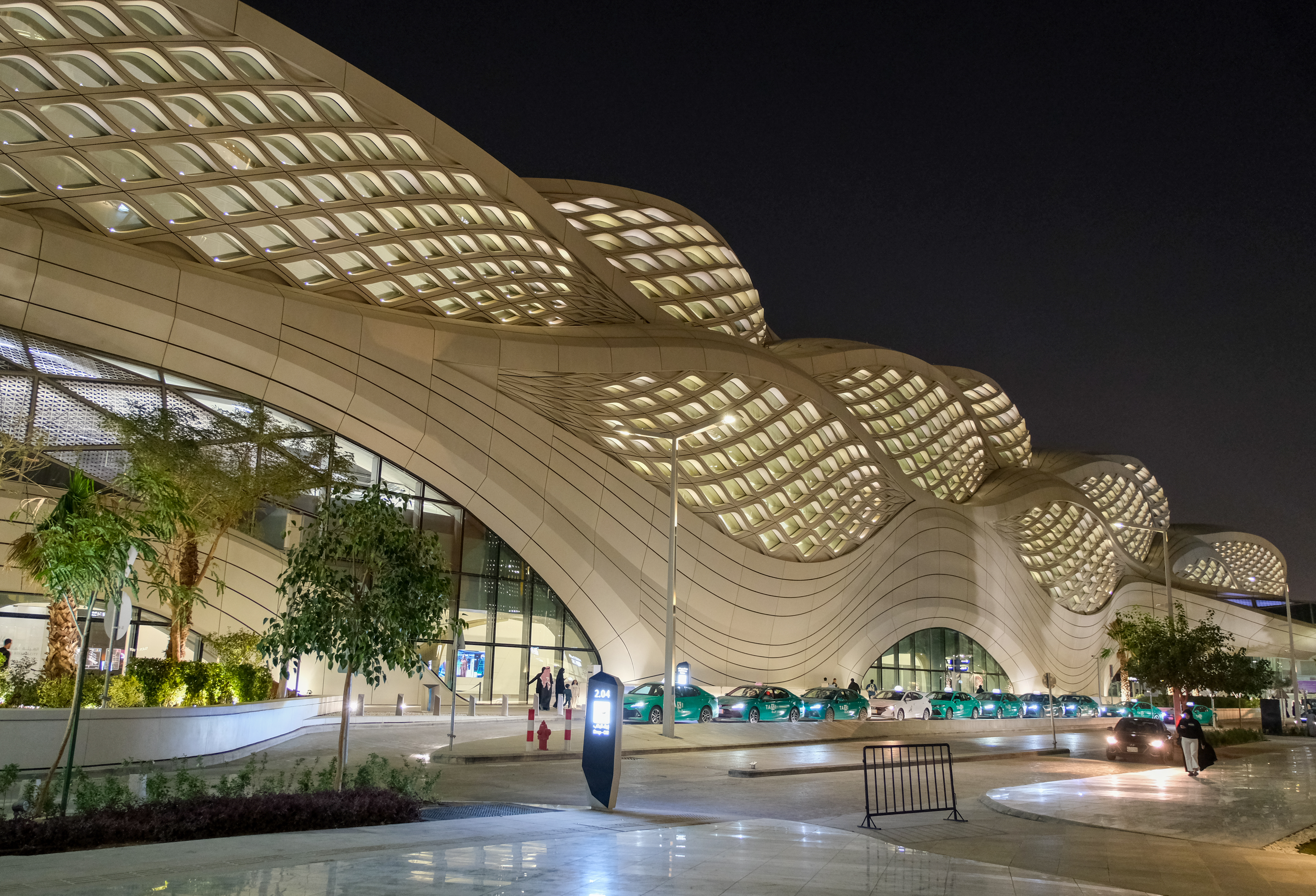
KAFD metro station

The district is served by the KAFD metro station on the Riyadh Metro. The station connects Lines 1, 4, and 6, and is one of the four major interchange stations on the network. It was designed by Zaha Hadid Architects.

=== Rail ===
On 21 September 2025, the Royal Commission for Riyadh City announced plans for the Qiddiya High Speed Railway. The railway is planned to include three stations: one at King Salman International Airport, one in the King Abdullah Financial District, and one serving Qiddiya City.

=== Monorail ===
The district is planned to be served by an internal monorail system measuring approximately 3.5 km in length and consisting of six stations, providing circulation within the King Abdullah Financial District.

== Gallery ==
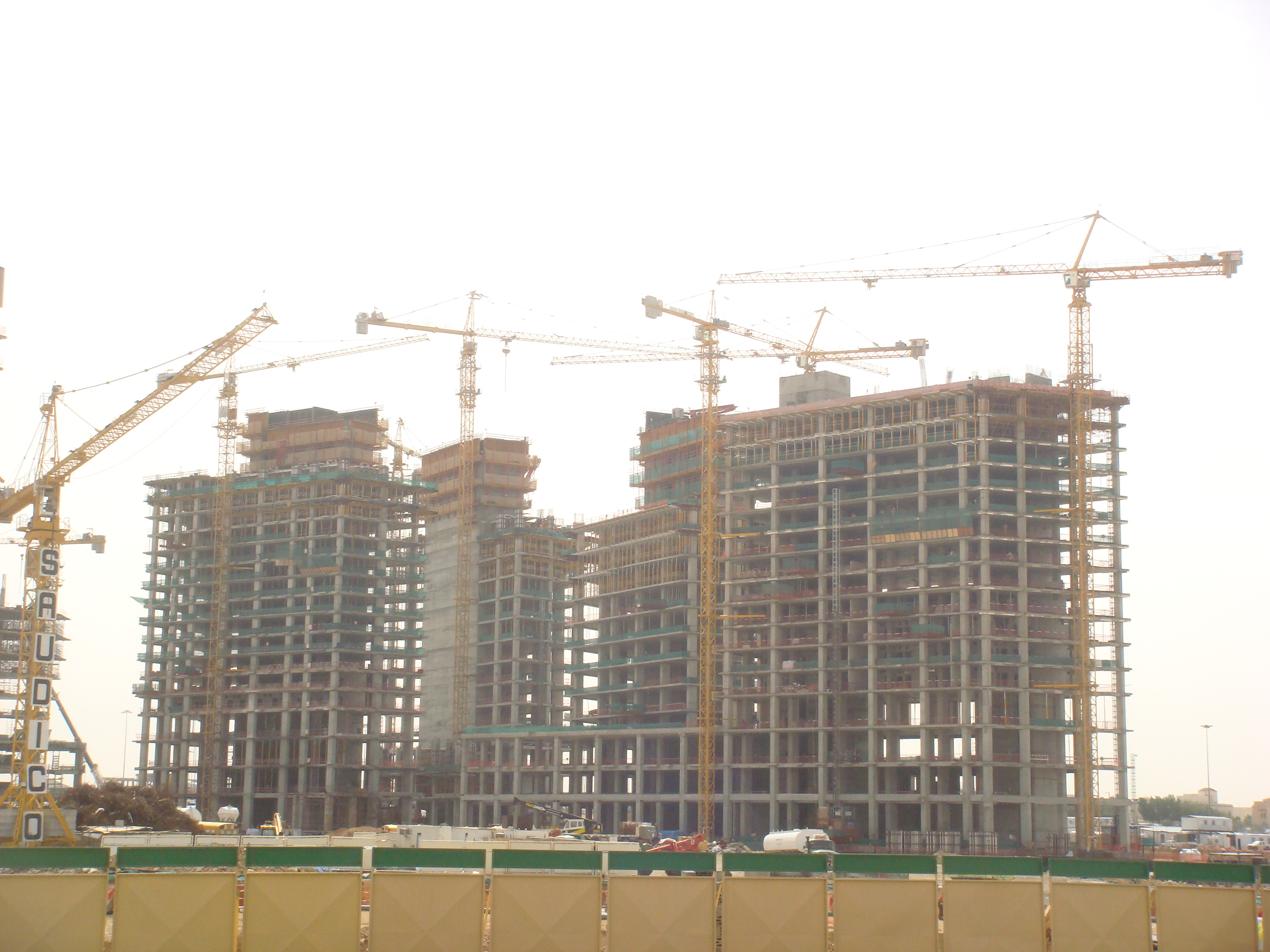
KAFD during early construction (23 April 2010)

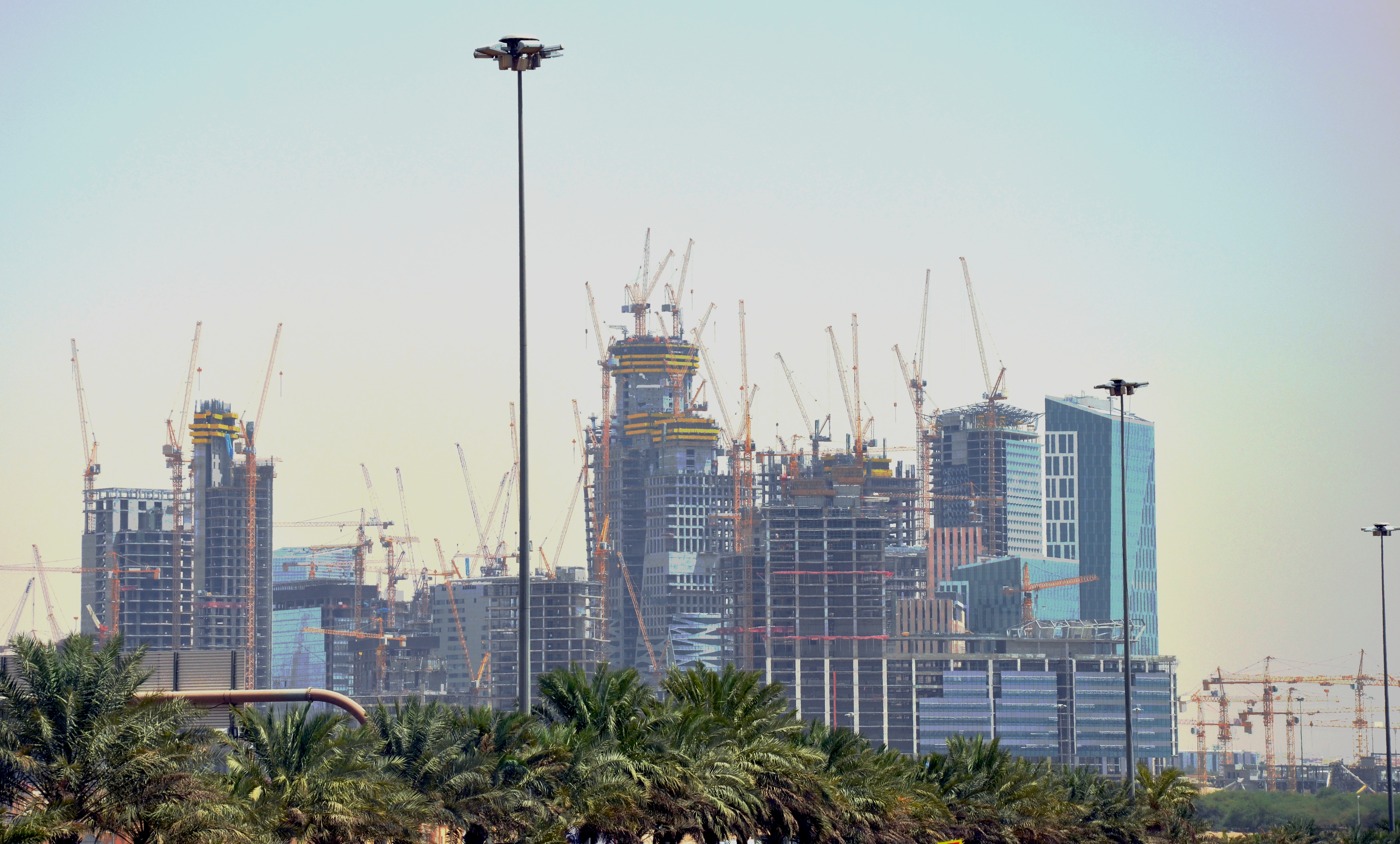
KAFD during construction (31 August 2012)

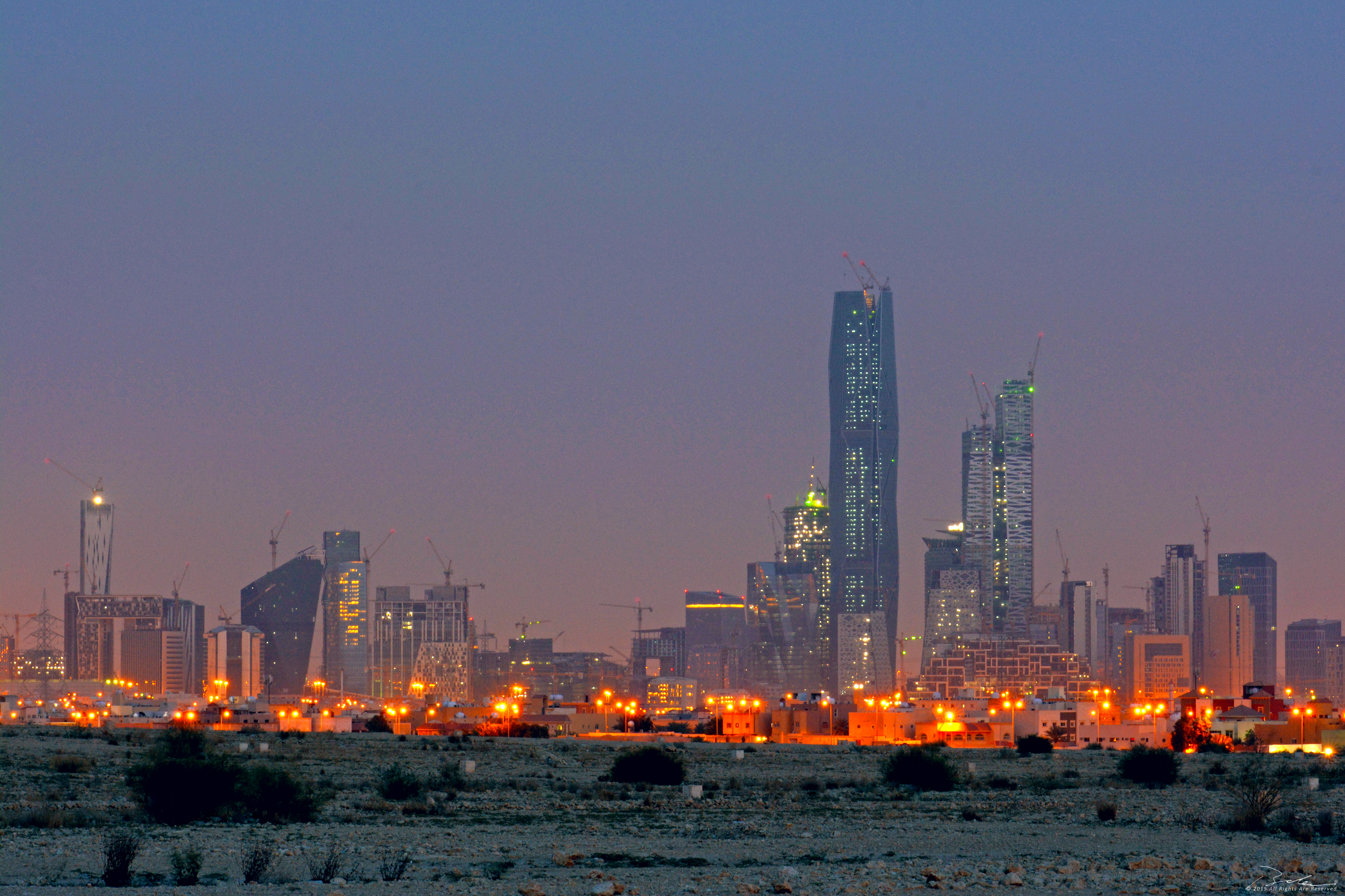
KAFD skyline, viewed from northeastern Riyadh (13 March 2015)

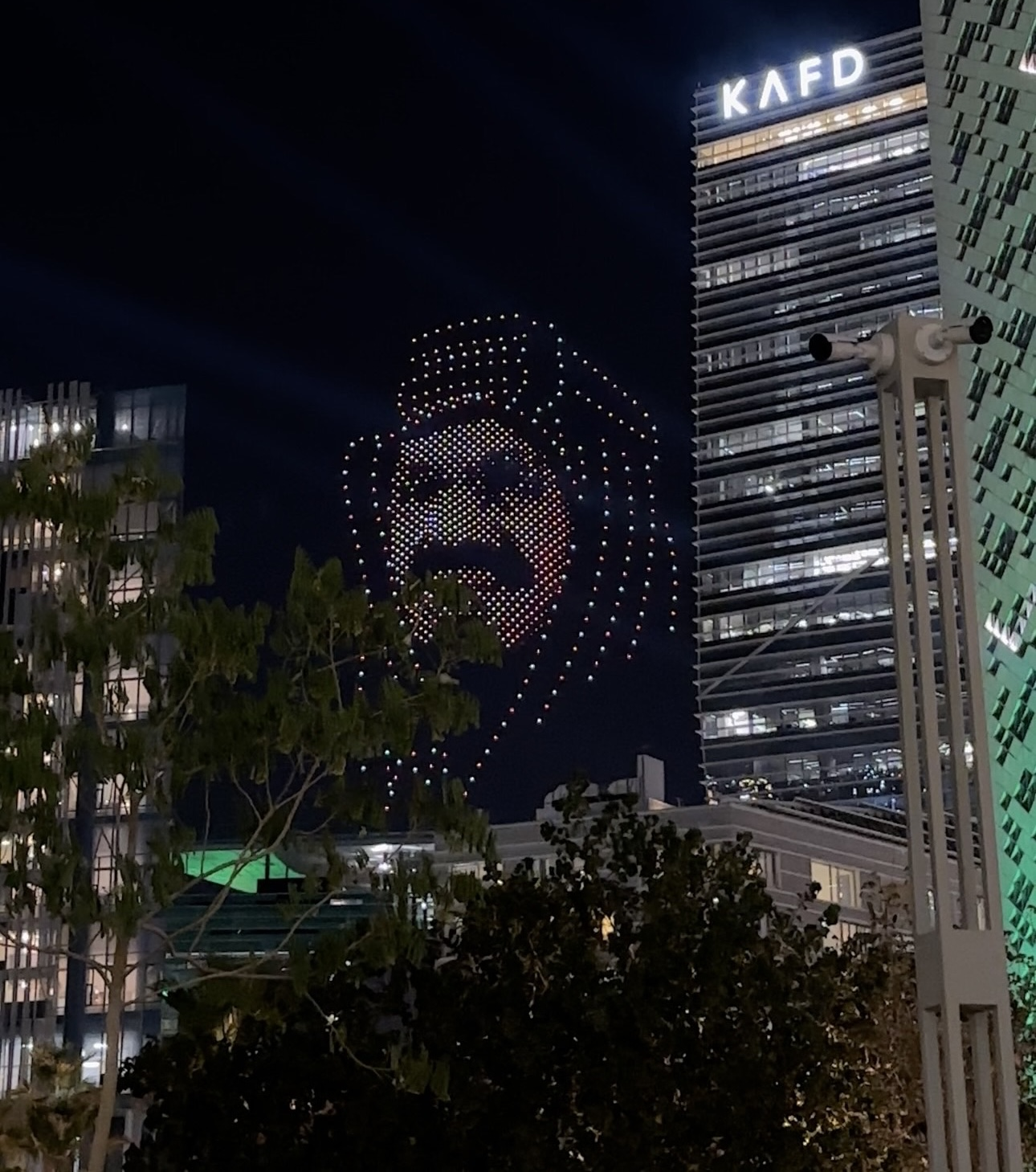
Drone show at KAFD during Saudi National Day celebrations (23 September 2024)

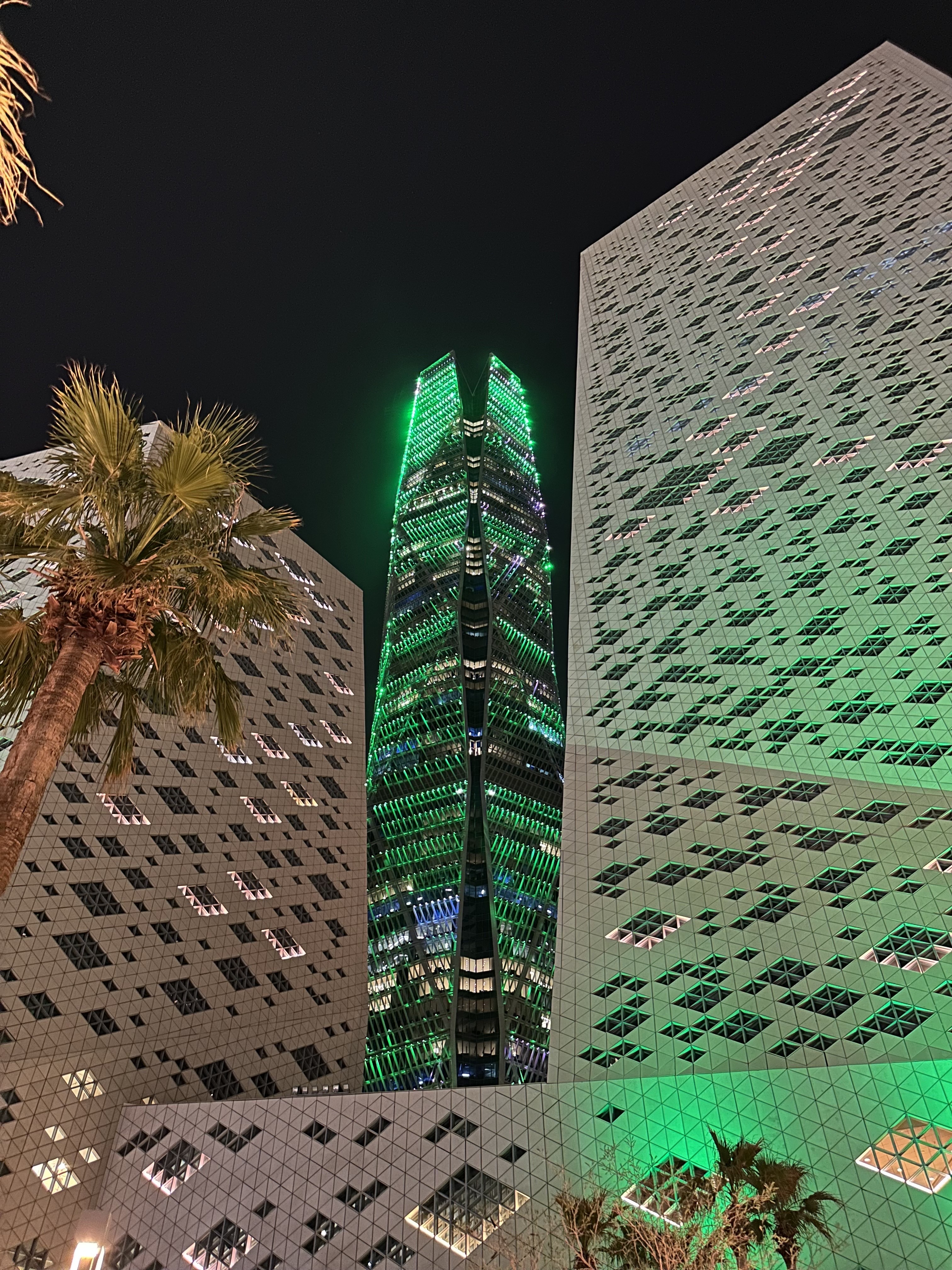
Public Investment Fund Tower at KAFD (23 September 2024)

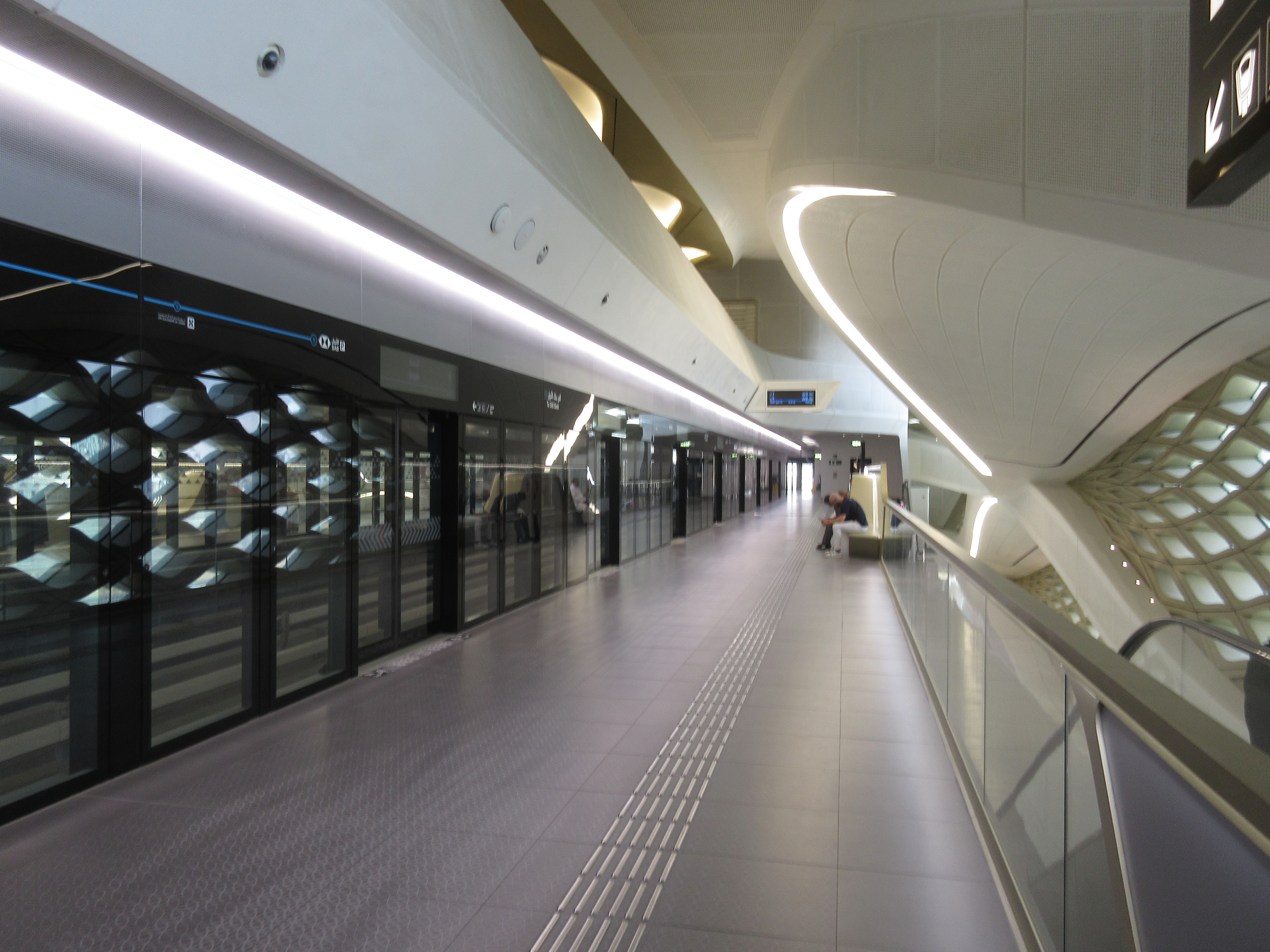
Interior of KAFD metro station (23 April 2025)

== See also ==
- Digital City
- KAFD metro station
- KAFD Grand Mosque
- Jeddah Economic City
- List of things named after Saudi kings
