= Jinwan, Zhuhai =

Jinwan 金湾区
- District
- Interactive map of Jinwan
- Location in Guangdong
- Coordinates: 22°04′00″N 113°20′39″E
- Country: People's Republic of China
- Province: Guangdong
- Prefecture-level city: Zhuhai City

Area
  - Total: 376 km^{2} (145 sq mi)

Population (2020 census)
  - Total: 446,369
  - Density: 1,190/km^{2} (3,070/sq mi)
- Time zone: UTC+8 (CST)

Jinwan District (simplified Chinese: 金湾区; traditional Chinese: 金灣區; pinyin: Jīnwān Qū; Jyutping: gam^{1}waan^{1} keoi^{1}; lit. 'Gold Bay') is a district of Zhuhai, Guangdong province, China.

Zhuhai Jinwan Airport and Jinwan Arts Center are in the district.

== Subdistricts ==
Name		Chinese (S)	Jyutping	Hanyu Pinyin	Population (2010)	Area (km^{2})
Sanzao town		三灶镇	saam^{1} zou^{3} zan^{3}	Sānzào Zhèn	82,221	96.00
Hongqi town		红旗镇	hung^{4} kei^{4} zan^{3}	Hóngqí Zhèn	67,631	150.00
Zhuhai Gaolanggang; Port Economic Zone	Pingsha town	平沙镇	ping^{4} saa^{1} zan^{3}	Píngshā Zhèn	67,149	197.00
Zhuhai Gaolanggang; Port Economic Zone	Nanshui town	南水镇	naam^{4} seoi^{2} zan^{3}	Nánshuǐ Zhèn	36,962	100.00
