= Unicorn Island =

67-hectare architecture and construction project in Chengdu, China

General information
- Type: Multi-use commercial
- Location: Chengdu, Sichuan Province, China

Design and construction
- Architecture firm: Zaha Hadid Architects

Unicorn Island is a planned development of office buildings and landscaping designed to attract and foster technology companies with valuations of more than $1 billion, "unicorns." Its area spans 67 hectares (170 acres). Zaha Hadid Architects is developing the plan for the Chengdu government on the eastern shore of Xin Long Lake in Chengdu, China. Construction of the first building, a conference center, neared completion during 2020.

== Background ==
The Chengdu government started the project to create jobs and attract advanced technology and research companies to Chengdu. The architectural plan aspires to eventually support "70,000 researchers, office staff, residents and visitors." Several architecture firms were said to compete for the opportunity to design the project, including: Office for Metropolitan Architecture, Morphosis, Foster + Partners, and Arata Isozaki & Associates and Jun Aoki & Associates. Zaha Hadid Architects was selected. The development is an example of a public private partnership. It is part of the Tianfu New Area designation, in which other projects are in progress like the technology-focused "Chengdu Future Science and Technology City" plan unveiled in 2021 designed by OMA architects.

The Unicorn Island plan envisions clusters of rounded buildings around a central plaza and metro station. Each cluster of buildings is intended to be only a few minutes walk or cycle ride to the plaza and station, to ensure the entire island is easily accessible. The building designs are intended to evoke the ancient Dujiangyan irrigation system a UNESCO world heritage site and irrigation and flood control project in China.

The project's first building neared completion in 2020. It is a conference center intended for startup exhibitions. The architecture firm published a promotional aerial video showing the construction site of the conference center. The building's style is an example Zaha Hadid's signature curving aesthetic that has been characterized as parametricism, deconstructivism, and neo-futurism architecture.

As a method of supportive public relations, the government of Chengdu commissioned a series of advertisements in The Wall Street Journal promoting the Unicorn Island development to the international business community.
