= Hansmeyer =

Hansmeyer is a surname. Notable people with the surname include:

- Michael Hansmeyer, American architect
- Stacy Hansmeyer (born 1978), American basketball player and coach
