= Patrik Schumacher =

German architect

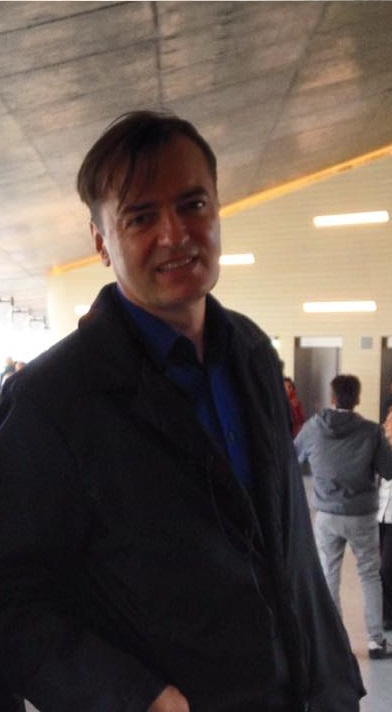
Patrik Schumacher

Patrik Schumacher (born 1961, Bonn, West Germany) is a German architect and architectural theorist. He is the principal architect of ZHA Architects. His works includes The Opus Tower in Dubai, the Morpheus Hotel in Macau, and the Beijing Daxing International Airport. In 2008 he coined the term parametricism, which refers to "a type of design process characterized by the interrelation of design variables (or, parameters) through computational tools and techniques."

== Education and early career ==
Schumacher studied Philosophy and Mathematics at the Friedrich Wilhelm University in Bonn in the early 1980s. In the mid-eighties he studied architecture in Stuttgart and in 1987 continued his architecture study at London Southbank University. In 1988, Schumacher worked in the design studio of Zaha Hadid, on the Vitra Firestation. In 1990, he returned to University of Stuttgart to complete his Diploma in Architecture and then re-joined Hadid. In 1999, he completed a PhD at the Institute of Cultural Science, Klagenfurt University.

== Teaching ==
Schumacher started a teaching career in 1993, teaching a post-graduate diploma course in architecture at Kingston University. From 1994 to 1996 Schumacher was an assistant professor at Technische Universität Berlin (TU). In 1996 he founded with Brett Steele the Design Research Laboratory (AADRL) at the Architectural Association School of Architecture in London.

== Professional career ==
Since its incorporation in the late 1990s, Schumacher served as a director of Zaha Hadid Architects (ZHA) and is credited as a partner and co-author of the practice's output. Since Hadid's death in April 2016, he has been leading the firm as its sole remaining partner.

== Theory and research ==
Schumacher has been publishing theoretical articles in architectural magazines and anthologies since 1996, arguing for an expanded formal and spatial design repertoire as architecture's response to the new level of societal complexity and dynamism brought on by the socio-economic transition from Fordism to Post-Fordism. Schumacher has also prompted controversy by promoting pro-free market ideas against social housing, housing regulations, and a centralised urban planning system. A former Marxist, Schumacher's viewpoints have been described as anarcho-capitalism. He advocates for the full decentralization and privatization of architecture, planning, and development, envisioning a competitive landscape of mini-polities organized as corporations vying in the market for communal living.

Schumacher uses the term "parametricism" to denote the use in the architecture of advanced computational design techniques. In 2008 he launched a manifesto for "parametricism" at the Venice Biennale of Architecture and a year later published the article "Parametricism: A New Global Style for Architecture and Urban Design" in the journal Architectural Design.

In 2011, Schumacher published the first volume of The Autopoiesis of Architecture, which he called his "opus magnum", offering a "New Framework for Architecture." His treatise has been praised for opening up the boundaries of architecture as a discipline but critiqued for its hubristic and universalizing tone. This was followed by the second volume, subtitled A New Agenda for Architecture, in 2012.

In 2016 he called for the abolition of regulation, privatisation of all public land and abolishing social housing to end the housing crisis in London.

== Writings ==
- Schumacher, Patrik. “Parametricism: A New Global Style for Architecture and Urban Design.” Architectural Design 79, no. 4 (2009): 14–23.
- Schumacher, Patrik. “Parametricism: A New Global Style for Architecture and Urbanism.” In Digital Cities AD, edited by Neil Leach. London: John Wiley & Sons, 2009.
- Schumacher, Patrik. “Patrik Schumacher on Parametricism—‘Let the Style Wars Begin.’” The Architects’ Journal 231, no. 16 (6 May 2010): 7–48.
- Schumacher, Patrik. The Autopoiesis of Architecture, Vol. 1: A New Framework for Architecture. London: John Wiley & Sons, 18 January 2011. ISBN 978-0-470-77298-0.
- Schumacher, Patrik. The Autopoiesis of Architecture, Vol. 2: A New Agenda for Architecture. London: John Wiley & Sons, 7 May 2012. ISBN 978-0-470-66616-6.
- Schumacher, Patrik. “The Parametricist Epoch: Let the Style Wars Begin.” The Architects’ Journal 231, no. 16 (May 2010): 41–45.
- Schumacher, Patrik, and Peter Eisenman. “I Am Trying to Imagine a Radical Free-market Urbanism.” In Log 28: Stocktaking, edited by Peter Eisenman and Anthony Vidler. New York: Anyone Corporation, 2013.
