= Port Authority Building (Antwerp) =

- Havenhuis
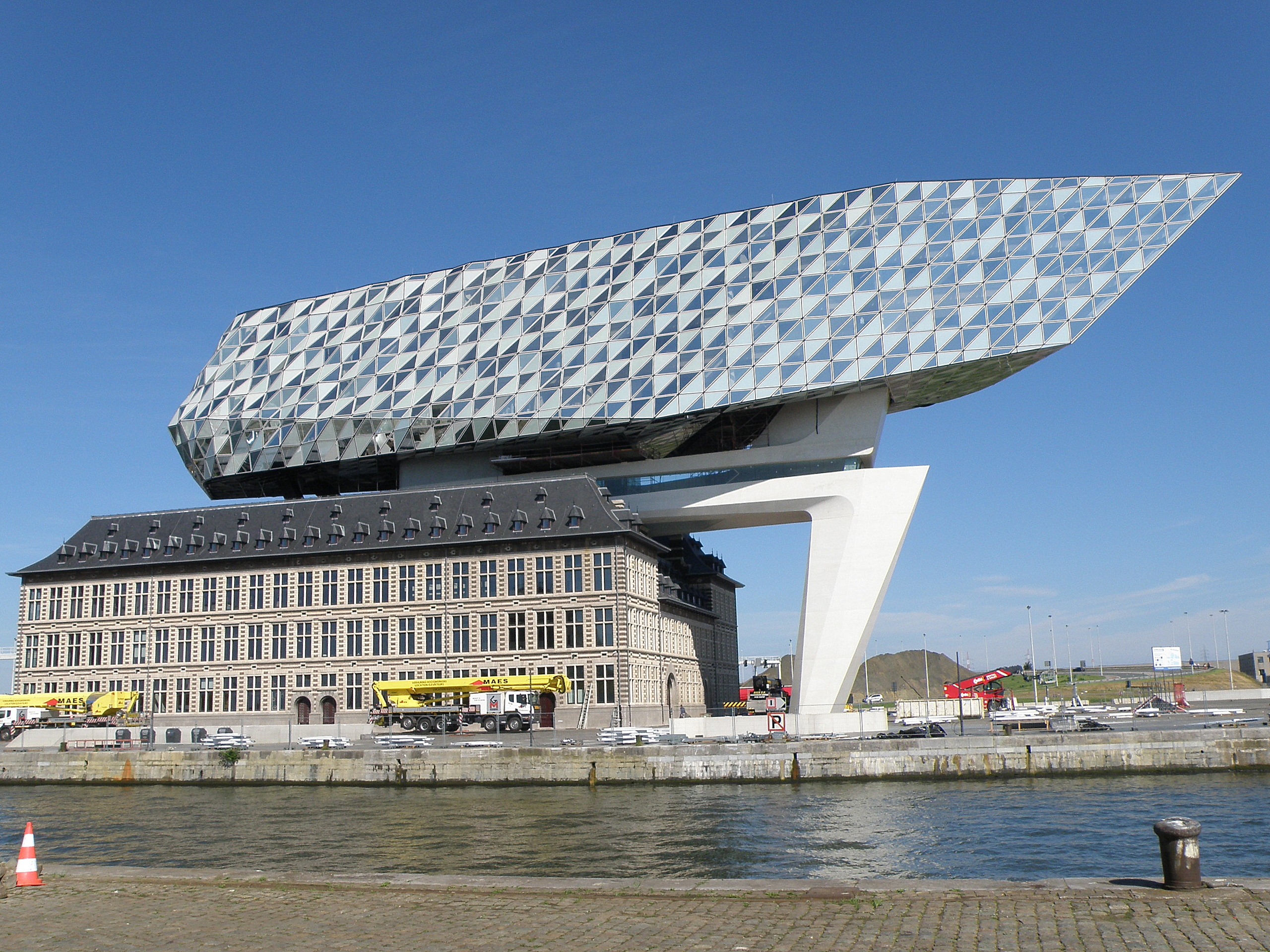
- Image of the exterior
- Interactive map of the Port Authority Building area
- Alternative names: Port House

General information
- Status: Completed
- Architectural style: Neo-futurist
- Location: Zaha Hadidplein 1, 2030 Antwerp, Belgium, Antwerp, Belgium
- Coordinates: 51°14′28″N 4°24′26″E
- Construction started: 2012
- Completed: 2016
- Opened: September 2016
- Owner: Port of Antwerp

Height
- Height: 46 m (151 ft)

Technical details
- Floor count: 5 (additional)
- Floor area: 12,800 m (41,994.75 ft)

Design and construction
- Architect: Zaha Hadid
- Architecture firm: Zaha Hadid Architects

Other information
- Seating capacity: 90
- Parking: 190 (bicycle); 25 (electric car)

References
- www.zaha-hadid.com/architecture/port-house/

The Port Authority Building (Dutch: Havenhuis), or the Port House, is a government building located in Antwerp, Belgium, built between 2009 and 2016. It is located in the area of Eilandje, in the Port of Antwerp, and acts as the new headquarters of the Antwerp Port Authority, housing various departments. Designed by Iraqi-British architect Zaha Hadid, the building opened in 2016, the year of her death. It is the sole government building designed by Hadid. The design of the building incorporates the use of a fire station, integrating it into the building. Attached above and connected to the fire station is a contemporary diamond-shaped structure marked by straight edges, with an additional column providing support from the floor.

The building houses approximately 500 employees, and acts as a meeting place for international contacts of the Antwerp port community. According to the Antwerp Port Authority, the building is meant to "symbolise the dynamic, reliable, ambitious and innovative nature" of the Port of Antwerp.

== History ==
The Port of Antwerp is Europe's second largest shipping port by traffic, handling 26% of Europe's container shipping. Before the construction of the Port Authority Building, the Antwerp Port Authority hosted technical and administrative services in different locations, including in the Hofstraat and in the old Port House at the Entrepotkaai.

In 2007, port authorities determined that a new location would enable its technical and administrative services to be housed together, providing new accommodation for about 500 staff. The new Port House would centralize operation into one building, improving efficiency.

The lower section of the building was a disused fire station, and a protected replica of a former Hanseatic house. Thus, it could not be demolished, and the fire station had to be integrated into the new project. According to Marc Van Peel, president of the port of Antwerp, “There was only one rule laid down in the architectural competition, namely that the original building had to be preserved." Several studies, such as a historic survey and an investigation into the historical values of the site, were conducted.

Van Peel stated that five shortlisted candidates all opted for the addition of a modern structure above the original building, and the design by Zaha Hadid Architects was chosen. This was considered appropriate as the original fire station was intended to include a tower. The construction of the expansion began in October 2012 and the building was officially opened in September 2016.

The waterside site offered sustainable construction benefits, allowing materials and components to be transported by water, which would meet the port's ecological targets.

In honour of the architect, the quayside in front of the building was named Zaha Hadidplein ("Zaha Hadid Square") by the city council.

== Design ==
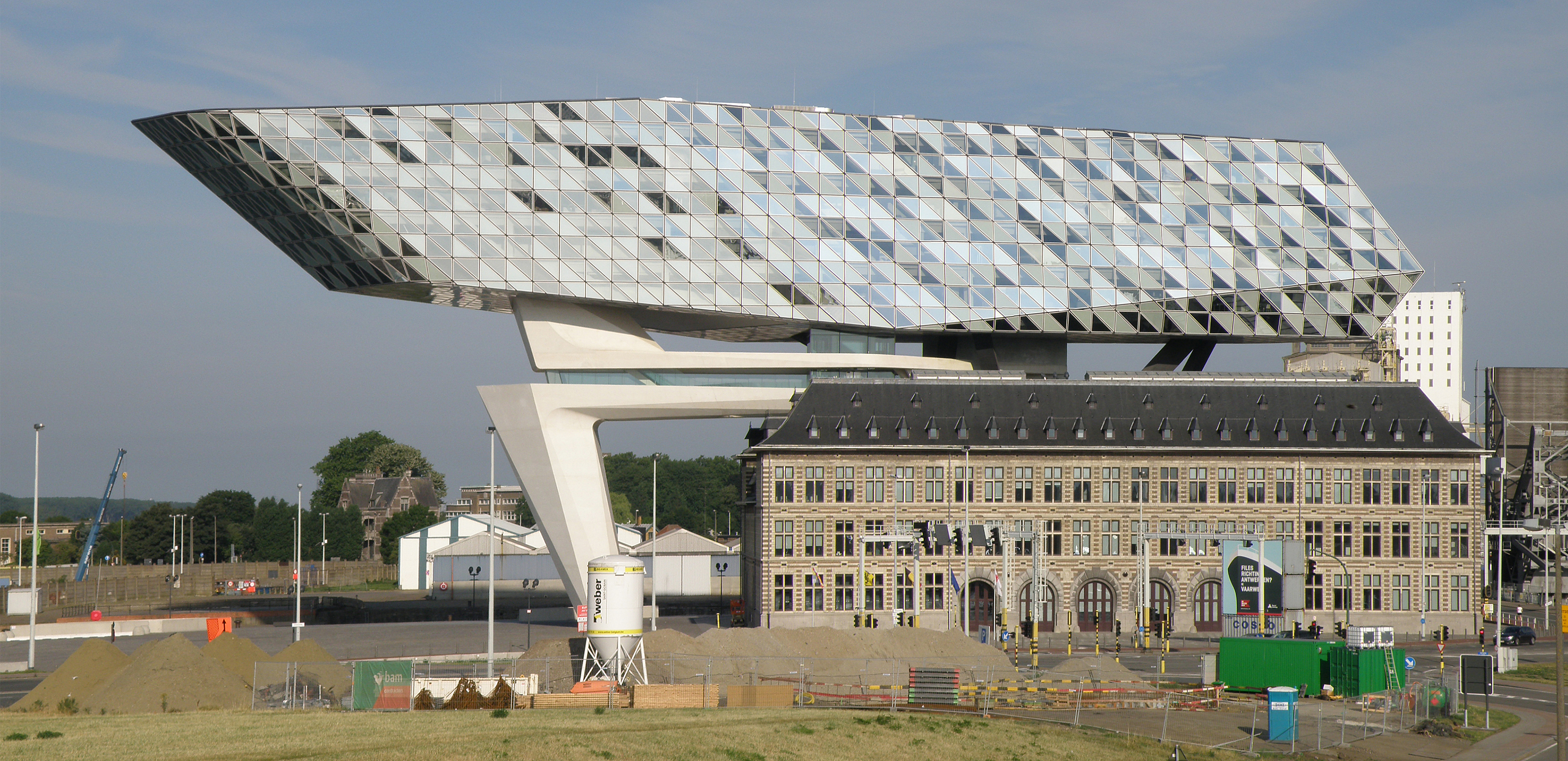
View from the side

The expansion of the building is located directly above the renovated fire station. It has a glass-covered facade to "reflect the complex interaction of shades and colours in the air", a reference to the building's location surrounded by water. The volume measures over 100 metres in length. The expansion resembles the hull of a sailing ship, with a protruding bow and the surface of the facets of a diamond facing the Kattendijk dock. This is also a reference to Antwerp's association with the diamond industry.

The exterior of the "diamond" consists of transparent and opaque triangular facets. This allowed the architects to control the amount of sunlight entering the building. The placement of the facets mimics the nearby River Scheldt. Project manager Joris Pauwels stated that concrete pillars and 900 tonnes of steel hold the glass workspace above the former fire station. A bridge level joins the two structures and gives employees a 360-degree view of the public square and the Scheldt below.

The design of the building took energy efficiency into account, reaching a 'Very Good' BREEAM environmental rating. A borehole energy system pumps water to a depth of 80 metres below grade in over 100 locations around the building to provide heating and cooling. The company Cegelec was in charge of installing and unifying the energy networks of the two buildings, with the insertion of plastic pipes to achieve an energy storage volume of 12 cubic metres.

The restored and preserved fire engine hall contains a public reading room and a library. The whole building has a total floorplan of 12,800 square metres, with 6,600 square metres in the refurbished fire station and a further 6,200 square metres in the extension.

== Accessibility ==
The port house has two areas of private parking. The entrance of the underground parking area is at the Mexicostraat, with charging points for electric cars. The second parking area is roughly two minutes from the Port House, on the Merantistraat. Across Antwerpen-Centraal railway station is a tram stop where you can take tram 24 (Silsburg-Havenhuis) to its final stop in front of the Port House.

== Awards ==
The Port House was nominated as a finalist for the A+Awards in the commercial office mid-rise category.

== Gallery ==
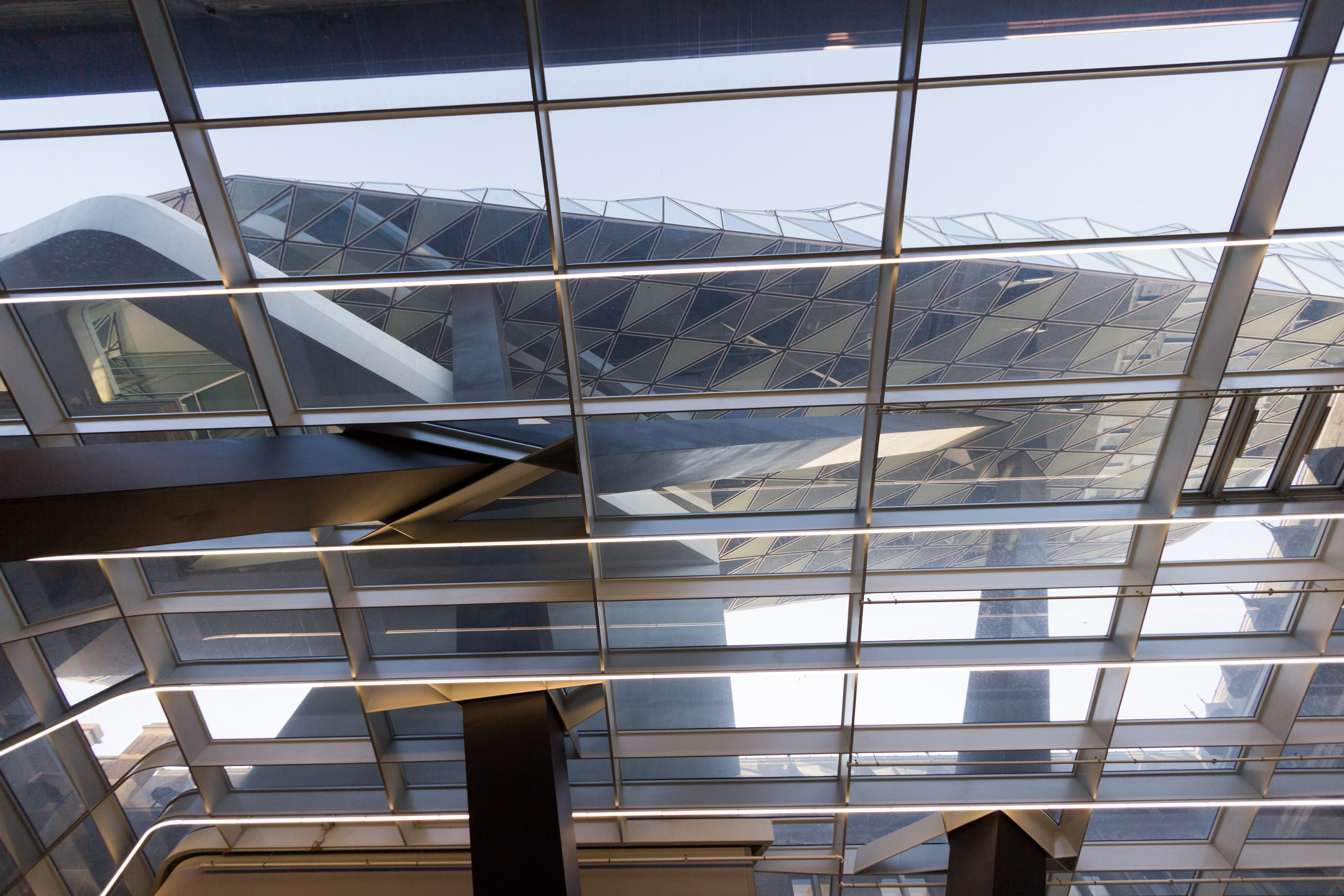
Support structure

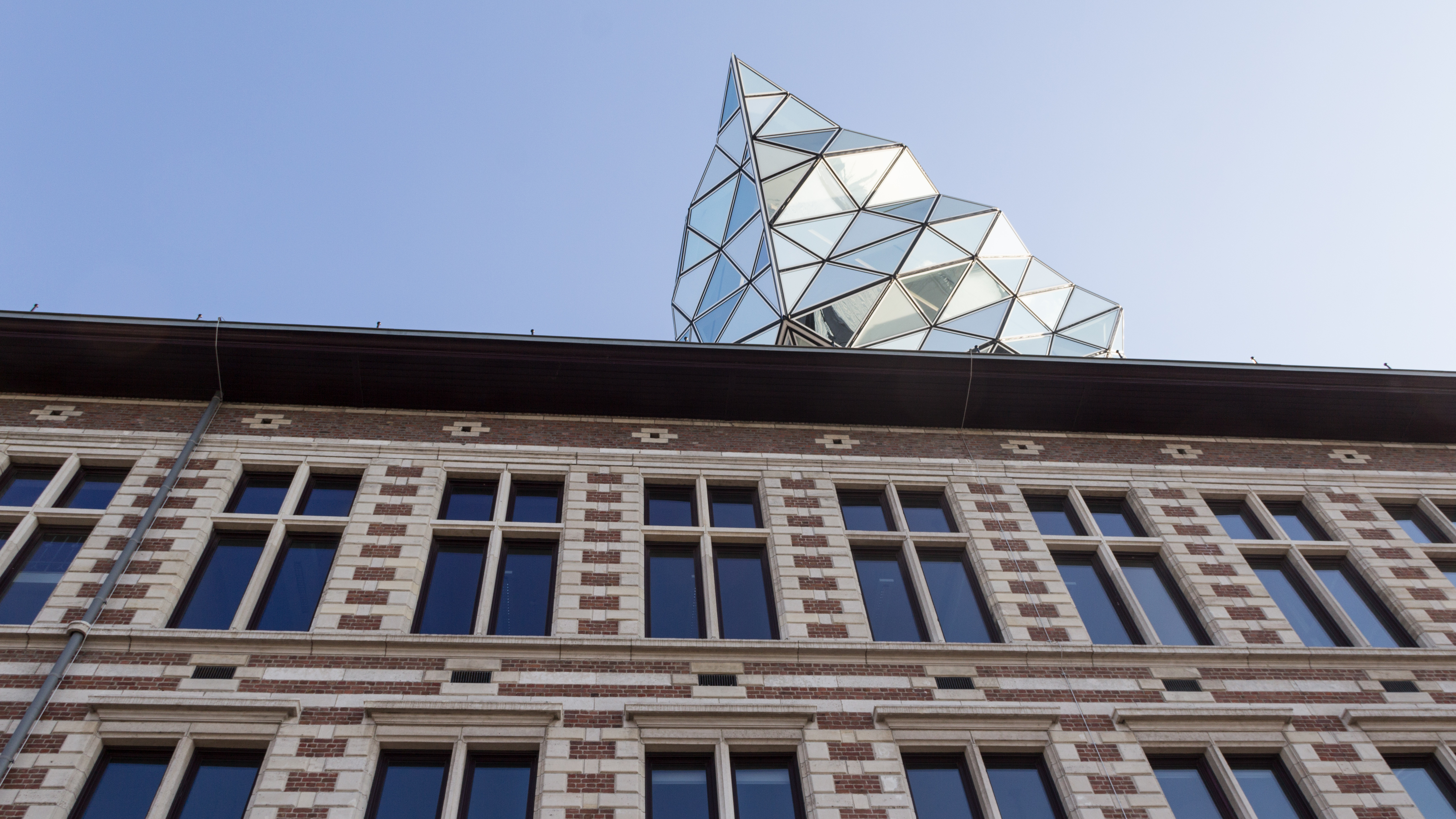
Old and new

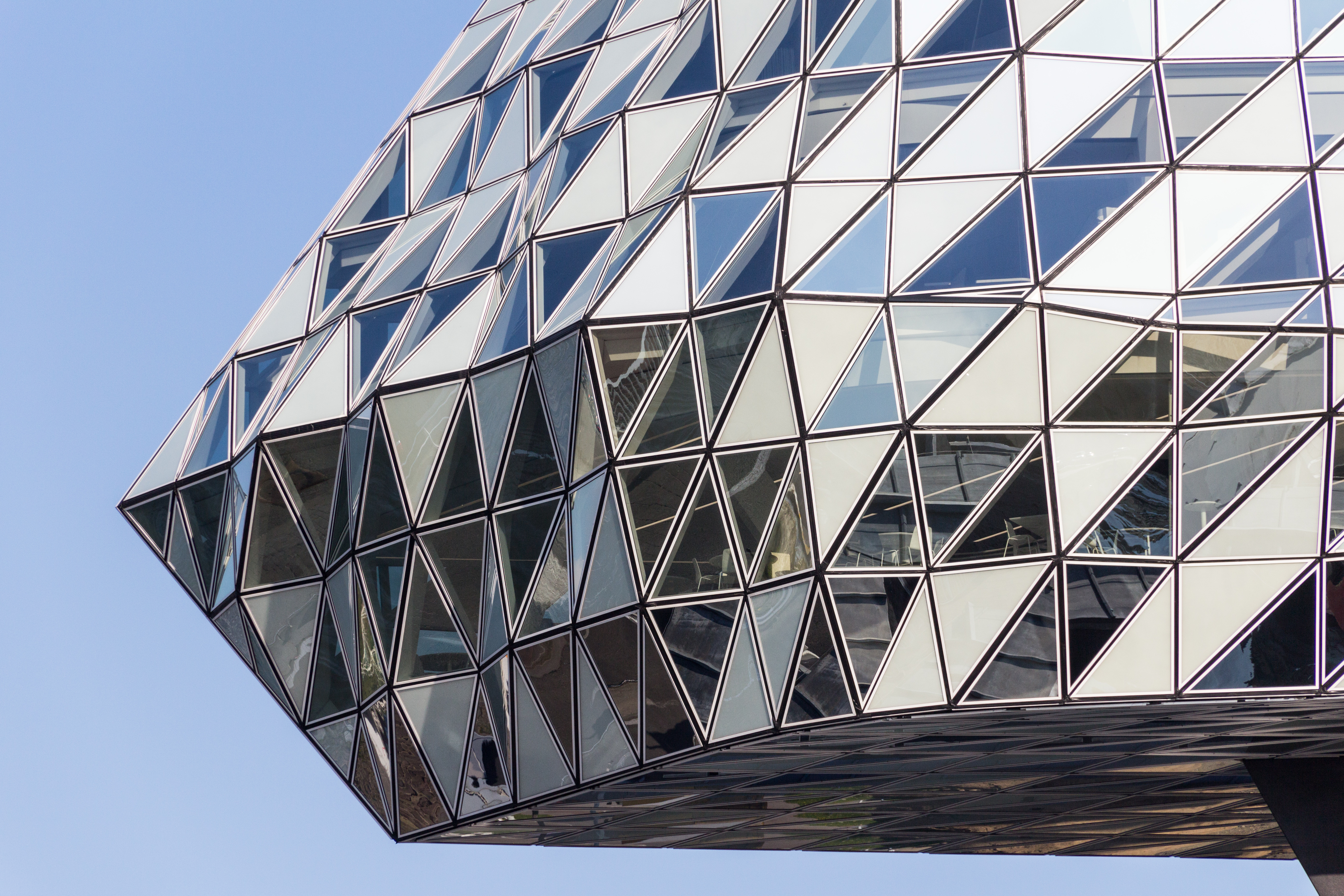
Facade details

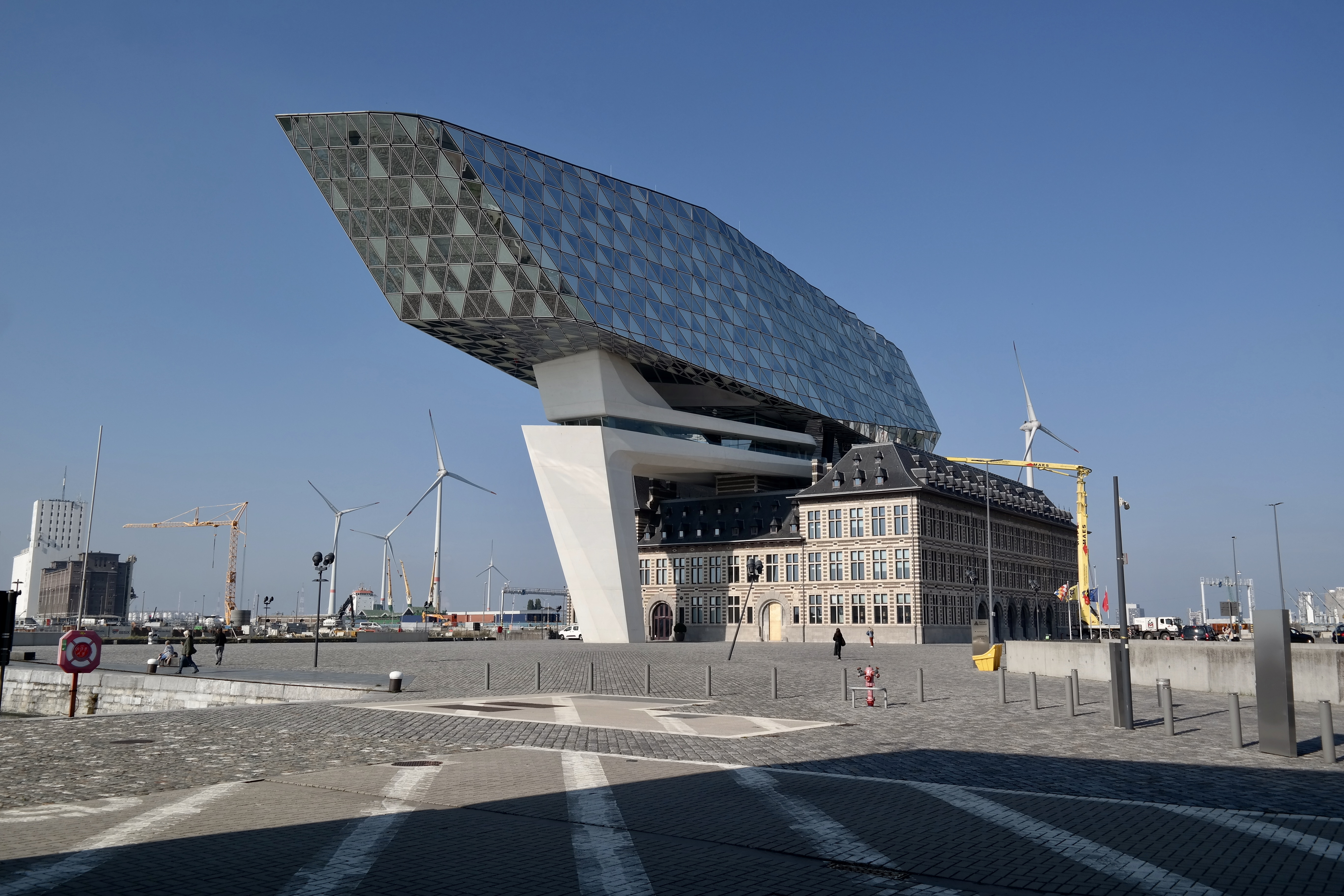
The building in 2021

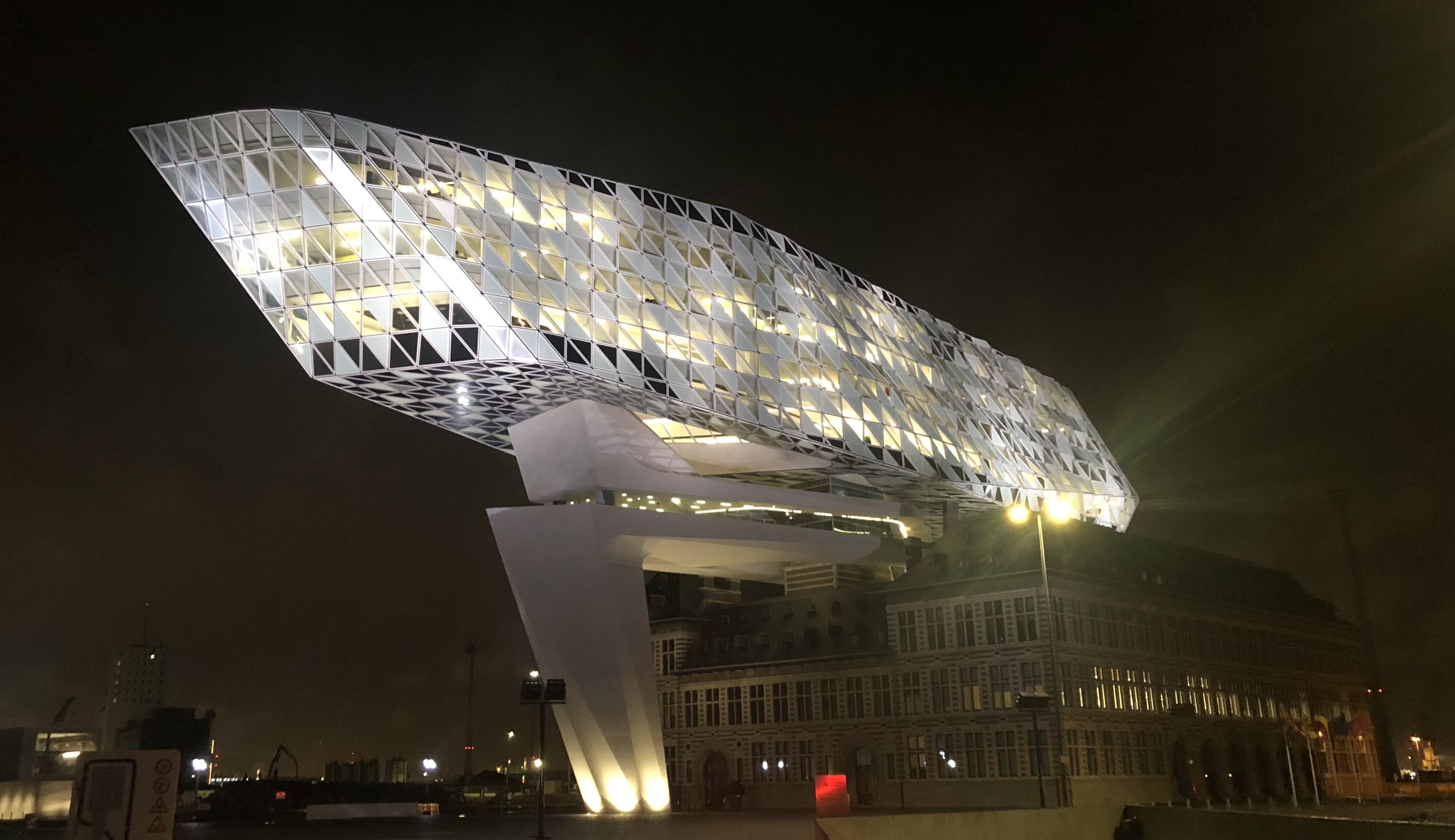
View by night in 2023
