= Jinwan Arts Center =

Zhuhai Jinwan Civic Art Centre
- 珠海金湾市民艺术中心; Zhūhǎi Jīnwān Shìmín Yìshù Zhōngxīn
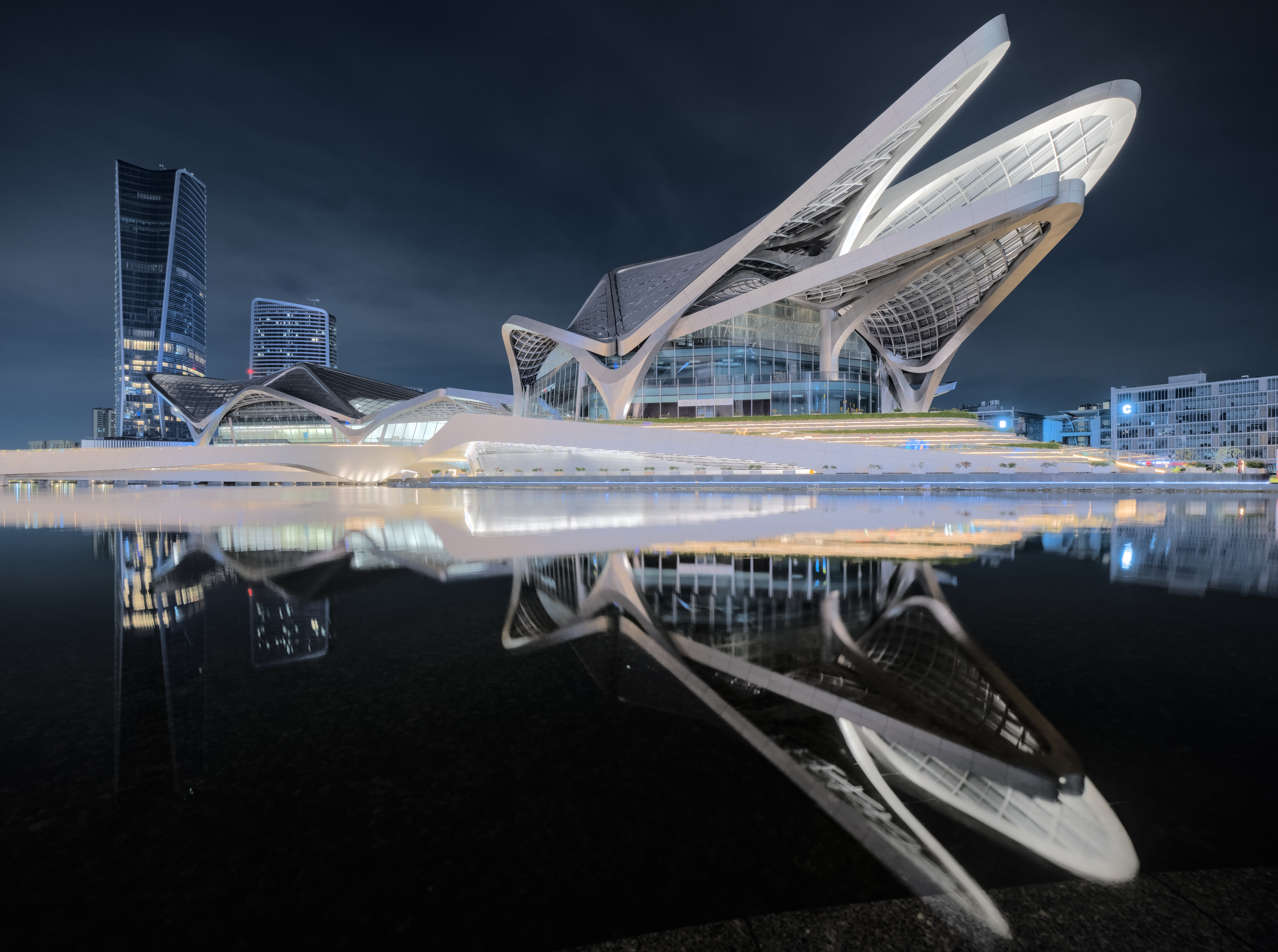
- Interactive map of the Zhuhai Jinwan Civic Art Centre area

General information
- Status: Completed
- Architectural style: Parametricism
- Location: Zhuhai, China, ZhongXin Lake, Jinwan District, Zhuhai, Guangdong, China
- Coordinates: 22°07′03″N 113°21′24″E
- Construction started: 2017
- Completed: 2023
- Owner: Zhuhai Huajin Development

Height
- Height: 35 m

Technical details
- Floor count: 2

Design and construction
- Architect: Zaha Hadid with Patrik Schumacher
- Architecture firm: Zaha Hadid Architects

The Zhuhai Jinwan Civic Art Centre (simplified Chinese: 珠海金湾市民艺术中心; traditional Chinese: 珠海金灣市民藝術中心; pinyin: Zhūhǎi Jīnwān Shìmín Yìshù Zhōngxīn) is a cultural complex located in the Jinwan District of Zhuhai, Guangdong, China. It was designed by Zaha Hadid Architects and completed in 2023. The complex integrates a performing arts centre, science centre, and art museum.

== History ==
The centre was commissioned by Zhuhai Huajin Development and Construction and built between 2017 and 2023. It is located in Aviation New City in Jinwan District, on a podium within ZhongXin Lake. The centre opened to the public in November 2023.

== Design ==
The complex is arranged around a central plaza and spans approximately 270 metres from north to south and 170 metres from east to west. According to Zaha Hadid Architects, the roof design was based on chevron patterns associated with migratory birds. The roof consists of latticed steel canopies over the four wings of the building.

The centre consists of five structurally separate buildings made primarily of concrete, with external steel canopies supported by 22 columns. The project has a listed height of 35 metres, with 48,432 square metres of above-ground gross floor area and 51,646 square metres below ground.

The building includes sustainability-related systems such as solar shading, double-insulated glazing, rainwater-management landscaping, water recycling, energy-consumption monitoring, and indoor-air-quality monitoring. The surrounding landscape and lake are described by the architects as part of Zhuhai's sponge city programme.

== Facilities ==
The centre houses three main cultural institutions:

- Performing Arts Centre: Includes a 1200-seat Grand Theatre and a 500-seat multifunctional Black Box theatre with retractable seating.
- Art Museum: Features exhibition spaces with a light material finish.
- Science Centre: Offers interactive exhibits and a lecture hall, designed with a darker material palette.

The central plaza serves as a shared external foyer with glazed walls. An external amphitheatre on the west side allows for outdoor performances.
