= Line 6 (Riyadh Metro) =

Metro line in Riyadh, Saudi Arabia

Purple Line 6
- Riyadh Metro map

Overview
- Other names: Line 6 Purple Line
- Status: Operating
- Owner: Royal Commission for Riyadh City
- Locale: Riyadh, Saudi Arabia
- Termini: KAFD; An Naseem
- Stations: 11

Service
- Type: Rapid transit
- System: Riyadh Metro
- Rolling stock: Alstom Metropolis

History
- Opened: 1 December 2024; 17 months ago

Technical
- Line length: 30 kilometers (19 mi)
- Track gauge: 1,435 mm (4 ft 8 1/2 in)

The Purple Line (Arabic: المسار البنفسجي) or Line 6, also known as Violet Line, is one of the six lines in the Riyadh Metro network in Riyadh, Saudi Arabia. It runs in a half-ring from King Abdullah Financial District, passing Imam Muhammad ibn Saud Islamic University, and ending at Prince Saad Ibn Abdulrahman Al-Awal Road. It's mostly elevated except along Sheikh Hassan Bin Hussein Bin Ali Street. The line has 11 stations with 3 interchange stations.

== Overview ==
It was built by a consortium of FCC, Atkins, Alstom, Samsung C&T, Strukton and TYPSA (Tecnica Y Proyectos).

== Route ==
| Code | Station Name | Interchange station to |
|---|---|---|
| 11 | KAFD | KAFD Blue Line 13 and KAFD Yellow Line 11 |
| 12 | Ar Rabi | Ar Rabi Yellow Line 12, Ar Rabi Interchange Bus Rapid Transite Line 11 and Community Bus route 730 King Abdulaziz 11 |
| 13 | Uthman Bin Affan Road | Uthman Bin Affan Road Yellow Line 13 |
| 14 | SABIC | SABIC Yellow Line 14 |
| 15 | Granada | |
| 16 | Al-Yarmuk | Al-Yarmuk Community Bus route 342 |
| 17 | Al-Hamra | Al-Hamra Red Line 22 |
| 18 | Al-Andalus | |
| 19 | Khurais Road | Khurais 03 Community Bus route 250 |
| 20 | As Salam | |
| 21 | An Naseem | An Naseem Orange Line 30 |
