= KAFD metro station =

Metro station in Riyadh, Saudi Arabia

Coordinates: 24.7675°N 46.6431°E

King Abdullah Financial District Metro Station محطة قطار مركز الملك عبدالله المالي
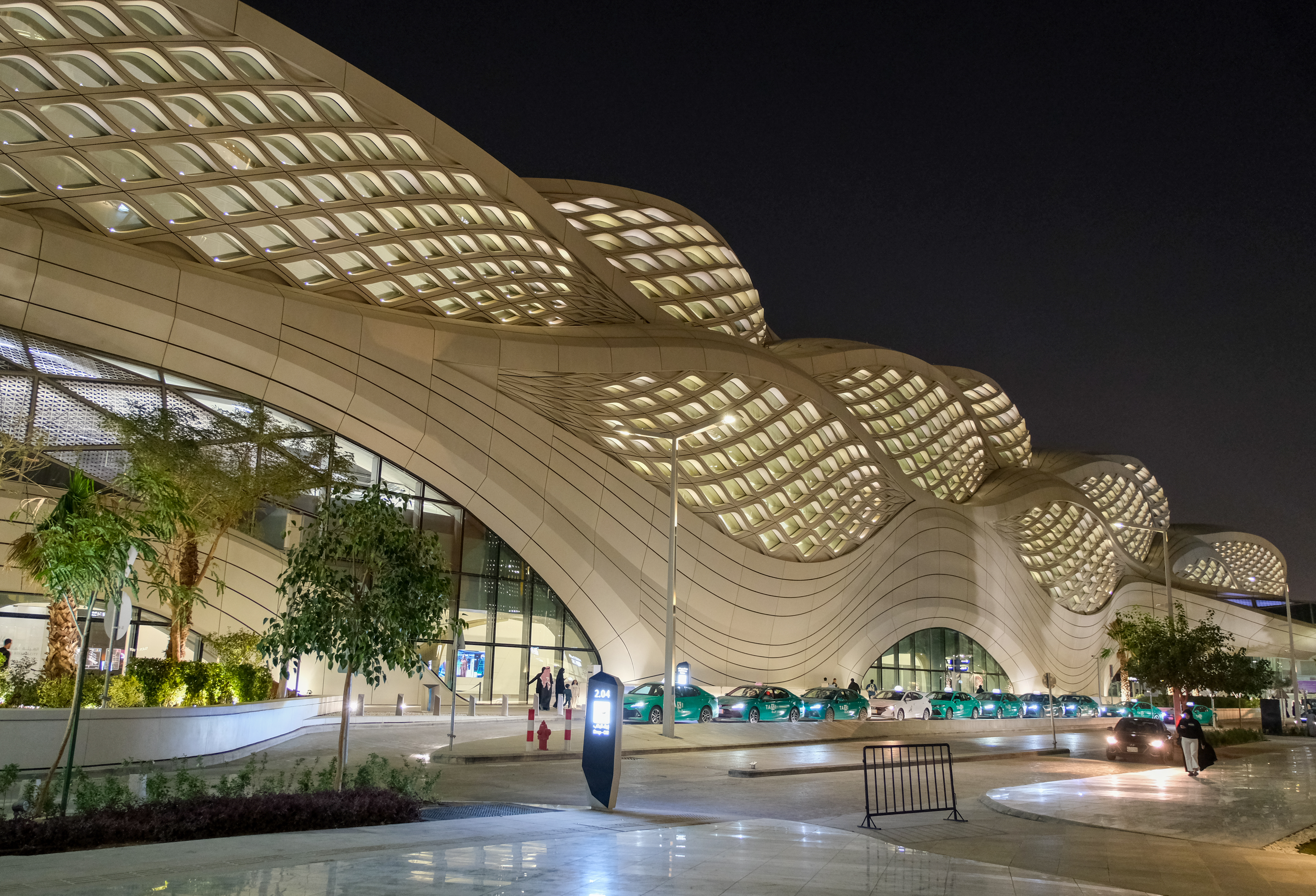
- Exterior view of the station

General information
- Location: King Abdullah Financial District, Riyadh
- Lines: Blue Line; Yellow Line; Purple Line
- Tracks: 6
- Connections: Bus

Other information
- Status: Operational
- Station code: 13 (Blue Line); 11 (Purple Line); 11 (Yellow Line)

History
- Opened: 1 December 2024

Services
Preceding station	Riyadh Metro	Following station
Dr Sulaiman Al-Habib towards SAB Bank	Line 1	Al-Murooj towards Ad Dar Al-Baida
Terminus	Line 4	Ar Rabi towards Airport T1-2
Terminus	Line 6	Ar Rabi towards An Naseem
Location

KAFD Metro Station (Arabic: محطة قطار كافد) is a rapid transit interchange station in the al-Aqeeq neighborhood of Riyadh, Saudi Arabia. It serves the Yellow Line, Blue Line, and Purple Line of the Riyadh Metro and is located within the King Abdullah Financial District.

== Overview ==
Covering an area of 8,150 square meters, the station was designed by ZHA Architects. Its design draws inspiration from mashrabiya screens and the patterns created by desert winds in sand dunes. The station features six metro tracks.

KAFD serves as an interchange station, connecting multiple lines. On the Blue Line, it lies between Dr Sulaiman Al-Habib and Al-Murooj stations, while on the Yellow Line and Purple Line, it precedes the Ar Rabi interchange station.

In 2013, Zaha Hadid Architects won the design competition held by the Royal Commission for Riyadh City for the KAFD metro station, which was initially expected to be completed by 2017.

Construction began in 2014, with tunneling work on the Blue Line starting in July 2015. By 2019, the exterior of the station was visible in an unclad skeletal form. The station earned Gold-level LEED Certification in October 2024, and in December 2024, it was completed and officially opened to the public.

== Gallery ==
Interior of KAFD metro station

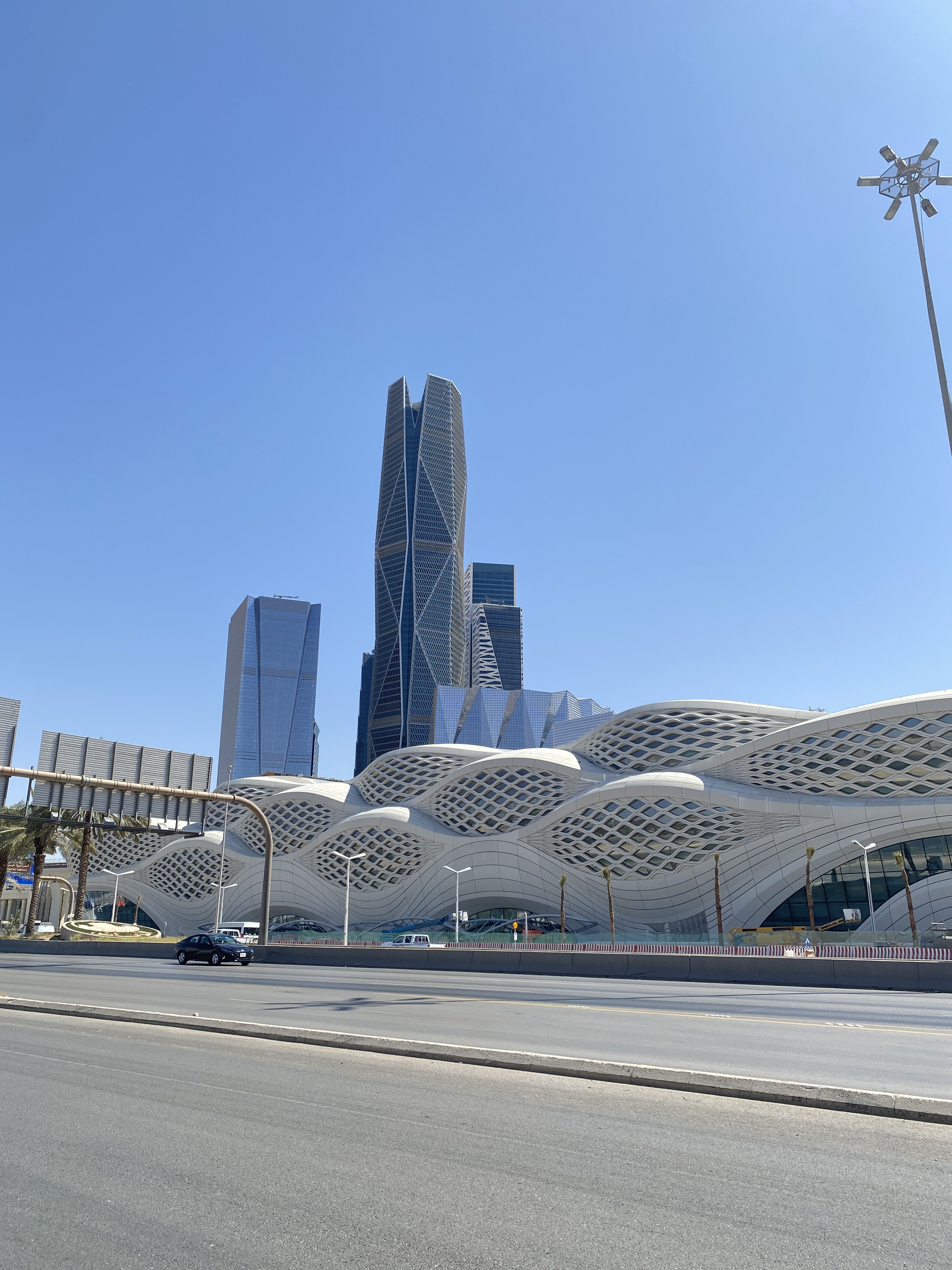
KAFD metro station in 2024
