= Parametric architecture =

Modern architectural style

Parametricism
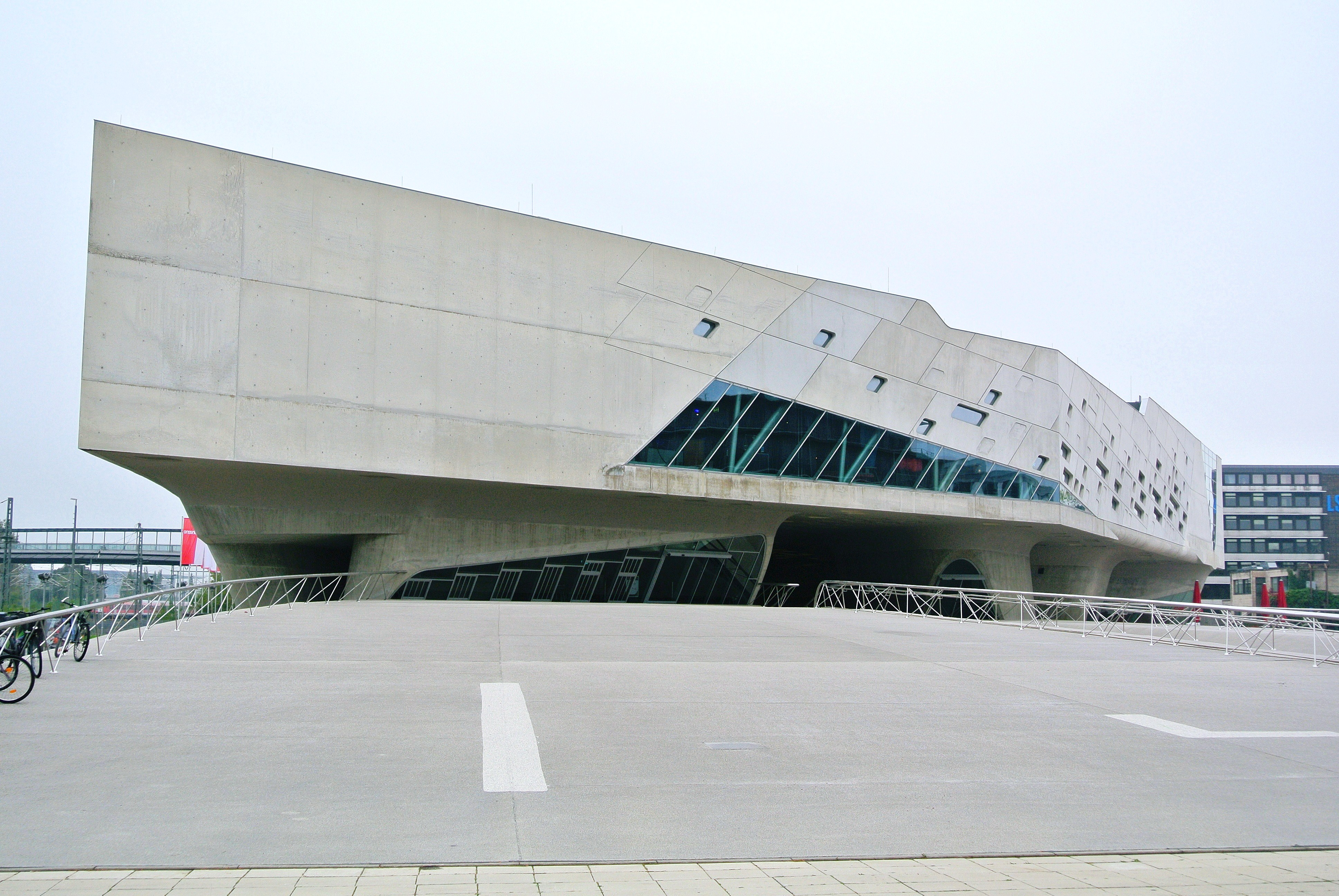
- Phaeno Science Center (Zaha Hadid Architects, 2000-2005)
- Years active: 1998–present
- Influences: Neo-futurism

Parametric architecture or parametricism is a contemporary architectural style and theoretical framework associated with algorithmic and parametric design methods. Parametricism emphasizes continuous variation, differentiation, and the correlation of architectural elements through computational processes. The term was coined in 2008 by Patrik Schumacher, who described it as a successor to modernism and postmodernism and proposed it as a new global architectural style for the 21st century.

Aspects of parametricism have been used in urban design, architectural design, interior design and furniture design. Proponents of parametricism have declared that one of the defining features is that "parametricism implies that all elements of the design become parametrically variable and mutually adaptive." According to Schumacher, parametricism is an autopoiesis, or a self-referential system, in which all the elements are interlinked and an outside influence that changes one alters all the others."

Parametricism rejects both homogenization (serial repetition) and pure difference (agglomeration of unrelated elements) in favor of differentiation and correlation as key compositional values. The aim is to build up more spatial complexity while maintaining legibility, i.e. to intensify relations between spaces (or elements of a composition) and to adapt to contexts in ways that establish legible connections. This allows architecture to translate the complexity of contemporary life processes in the global Post-Fordist network society.

== History ==
=== Origin of the term ===
The term parametricism was introduced in 2008 by architect and theorist Patrik Schumacher. Schumacher presented the concept as a new architectural style intended to succeed modernism and postmodernism, arguing that advances in digital design technologies had enabled a coherent formal and organizational approach based on parametric modeling. The term was publicized in lectures and essays and further developed in subsequent publications, where Schumacher outlined a series of principles intended to define the style.

Although parametric design techniques had been used in architecture prior to 2008, particularly in computational and algorithmic design practices emerging in the late 20th century, parametricism refers specifically to Schumacher’s theoretical framing of these techniques as a unified stylistic movement.

=== Background ===
The theoretical and technical foundations associated with Parametricism developed over several decades prior to the introduction of the term in 2008. Long before the widespread use of digital modeling, architects and engineers —including Antonio Gaudi, Erich Mendelsohn, Frei Otto, Frederick Kiesler, and Kiyonori Kikutake— experimented with systems-based design, structural optimization, and form-finding processes.

During the late 20th century, architectural discourse increasingly engaged with concepts derived from systems theory, complexity, and non-linear organization. Movements such as deconstructivism challenged rigid geometrical composition and explored fragmented and dynamic spatial arrangements. While these approaches were not parametric in a digital sense, they contributed to a broader shift away from static, orthogonal forms.

=== Early development ===
Parametricism emerged as a theory-driven avant-garde design movement in the early 1990s, with its earliest practitioners – Greg Lynn, Jesse Reiser, Lars Spuybroek, Kas Oosterhuis among many others – harnessing and adapting the then new digital animation software and other advanced computational processes that had been introduced within architecture much earlier by pioneers like John Frazer and Paul Coates, but that only spread to make an impact within avant-garde architecture in the last 10–15 years. Schumacher has said that he believes the work of Frei Otto (1925 - 2015) is a precursor of parametricism, as Frei "used physical processes as simulations and design engines to 'find' form rather than to draw conventional or invented forms. The inherent lawfulness of the engaged physical processes produced a combination of complexity, rigor and elegance that was otherwise unattainable. The power and beauty of this approach was striking."

Early instances of proto-parametricism, as manifest through the prolific generation of innovative designs and radical experiments within the transitional styles of deconstructivism and folding - including the work of the discipline's discourse leaders such as Peter Eisenman, Frank Gehry, Zaha Hadid, Rem Koolhaas, Wolf D. Prix, Bernard Tschumi, and Daniel Libeskind - were later radicalized by younger practitioners who matured in the context of these early practices, and stabilized the discipline around prolonged research programmes thriving on emerging digital technologies, and culminating in the emergence of parametricism.

Parametricism co-evolved with the global shift from the Modernist era of Fordism (mass production) to the Post-Fordist era (mass customization) of contemporary global society, and continues to evolve in an increasingly complex and fluid network of global societal communication systems. Parametricism offers advantages over styles that cannot (because they were never intended to) resonate and respond to the complexity and rapid fluidity of today's society. Despite the persistence of styles such as modernism, minimalism, postmodernism, historicism and deconstructivism, a hard core of continuous innovation in research and building has stabilized around the new heuristics of parametricism, and is continuing to proliferate the new style in academic and practice domains worldwide.

== Theory ==
Parametricism offers functional and formal heuristics based on set of general abstract rules distilled from a very complex ecosystem of sustained avant-garde design research that spans over three decades of continuous innovative communication. Parametricism achieves elegance in both senses of the word – it is unified (compact) and beautiful (vital).

=== Functional heuristics ===
The functional heuristics of parametricism include both negative principles and positive principles that have evolved since the mid-1990s across many projects worldwide, and that together constitute unifying heuristics. The negative principles include the avoidance of functional stereotypes (i.e. prescriptive program typologies), and the avoidance of segregative functional zoning (i.e. impermeable separation spaces according to single function allocation). The positive principles include the networking of parametric activity/event scenarios, and the communication of all spaces, activities and events.

=== Formal heuristics ===
Similar to the functional heuristics, there are unified formal heuristics distinguishing parametricism from other styles of architecture. The negative principles include the avoidance of rigid forms that lack malleability; the avoidance of simple repetition that lacks variety; and the avoidance of collage of isolated and unrelated elements that result in a lack of order. The positive principles include the intelligent information-rich deformation of soft forms; differentiation of all systems through gradients, thresholds and singularities; and interdependent correlation of all systems.

== Notable works ==
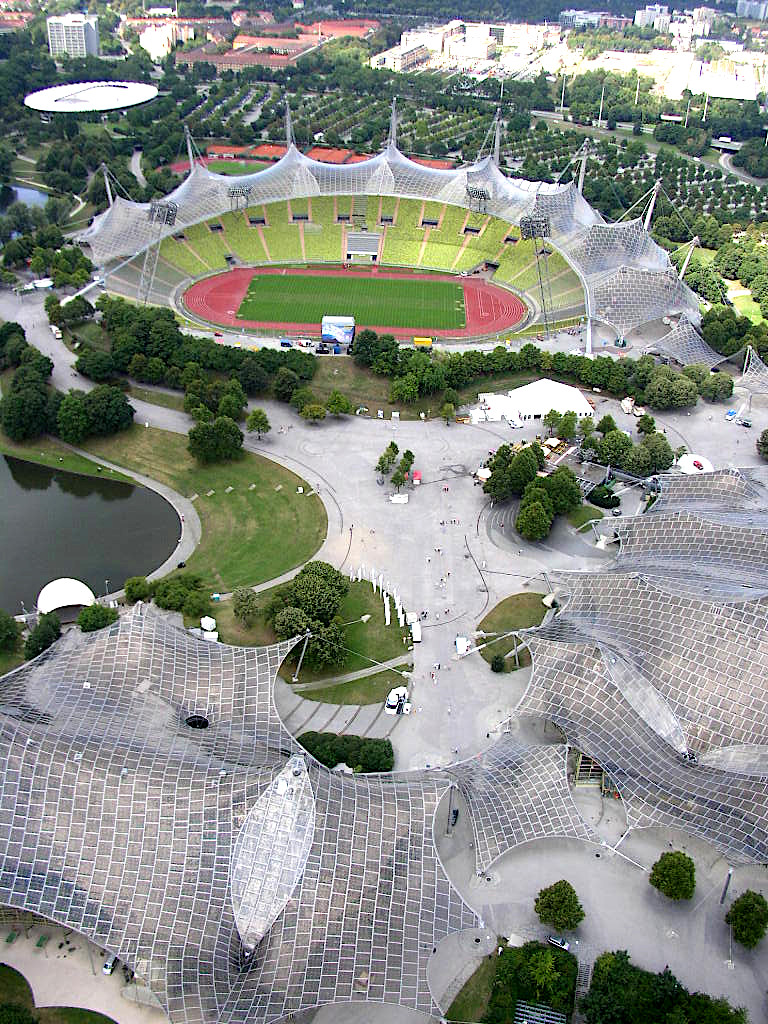
Munich Olympic Stadium (Frei Otto and Günther Behnisch, 1972)

=== Proto parametricism (1952–1992) ===
Throughout his career, Frei Otto conducted research focused on constructing light-weight, tensile structures through form-finding physical models that performed analog "material computation". This work is regarded as the precursor to parametricism. His design for the Olympic Stadium, Munich, built for the 1972 Summer Olympics, is a celebrated example of highly innovative lightweight tent construction, designed in collaboration with the architect Günther Behnisch.

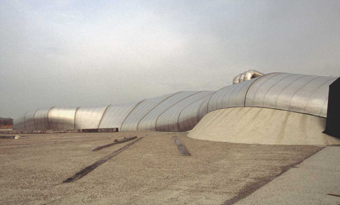
The Water Pavilion (Lars Spuybroek, 1993–1997)

=== Early parametricism (1993–2008) ===
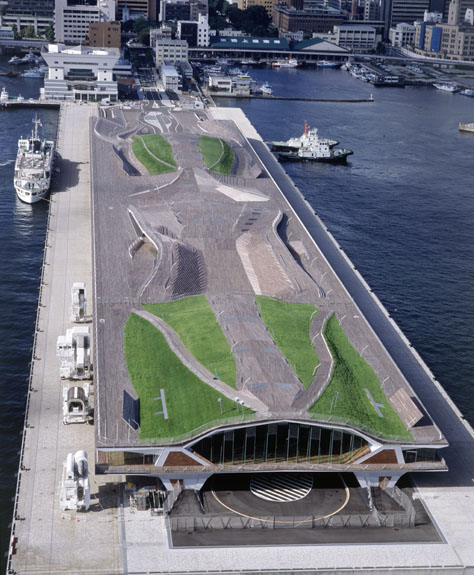
Yokohama International Passenger Terminal (Foreign Office Architects, 1995–2002)

Beyond the discursive paradigm shifts that led to the emergence of Parametricism, the ambition of the early built projects (1993-2008) was focused on adapting and innovating manufacturing and construction processes, upgrading the discipline's capacity to translate complex digital designs into constructible material assemblies.

One of the earliest built examples, the Water Pavilion (1993-1997), by Lars Spuybroek (NOX) and Kas Oosterhuis (ONL), was the first building to combine continuous geometry with the utilisation of sensors throughout the interior, creating an interactive environment (also known as responsive architecture) where light and sound could be transformed by visitors. Spuybroek's building was praised by the renowned architecture critic Charles Jencks as "yet to be surpassed" in his book The New Paradigm of Architecture.

Among the most critically acclaimed and stylistically defining of the earliest projects is the Yokohama International Passenger Terminal (1995-2002), designed by Foreign Office Architects (FOA), headed by Farshid Moussavi and Alejandro Zaera-Polo. The project was praised for its "inventive architectural methodology and socially conscious thinking". The project broke new ground, both formally and socially, enriching a prominent shared urban space.

Another notable early example is a project designed by Greg Lynn (FORM), Douglas Garofalo (Garofalo Architects) and Michael McInturf (Michael McInturf Architects) using vector-based animation software (1999). This addition of a 1500-seat sanctuary on the roof of a renovated laundry factory was part of its conversion to the New York Presbyterian Church in Queens, New York (1999).

Among the most celebrated and stylistically defining of the early built projects is the Phaeno Science Center in Wolfsburg, Germany, designed by Zaha Hadid Architects starting in 2000. The building opened to the public in 2005, and has been described as a "hypnotic work of architecture - the kind of building that utterly transforms our vision of the future." It won a 2006 RIBA European Award, and the 2006 Institution of Structural Engineers Award for Arts, Leisure and Entertainment Structures.

A later example is the 22-story concrete shell tower 0–14 in Dubai, UAE (2007), designed by Reiser + Umemoto. The structural shell creates a unique lace-like facade is modulated for variable light and views. The one meter space between the shell and main enclosure creates natural air movement that cools the glass facade. This is a very early example of the environmental design benefits that are achieved by applying the adaptive heuristics of Parametricism. The building's load-bearing concrete shell eliminates the need for internal columns and load-bearing walls.

Morphosis Architects' Giant Interactive Group Corporate Headquarters, designed in 2005-2006 and constructed in 2009–2010, is described by the architects as "emerging organically from complexity". The campus is designed as a village that accommodates a diverse array of functions within a continuous folding plane that undulates in and out of the ground plane, creating a new artificial landscape.

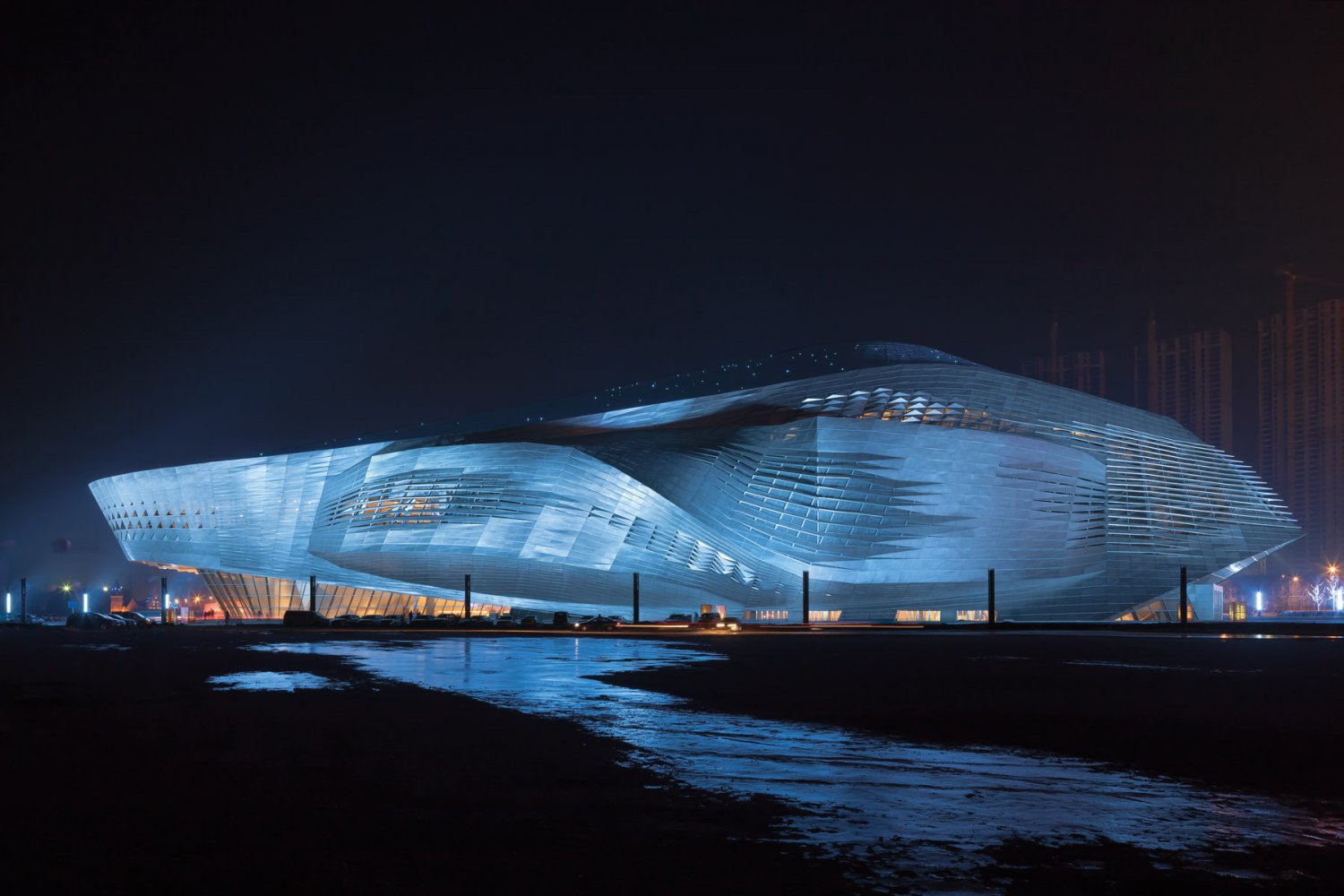
Dalian International Conference Center (Coop Himmelb(l)au, 2008–2012)

=== Parametricism 1.0 (2009–2014) ===
The most complex and important built projects designed in the style of Parametricism were completed after the 2008 financial crisis.

Coop Himmelb(l)au's Dalian International Conference Center in Dalian, Liaoning, China, was completed in 2012, bringing a parametric design to the edge of the Bay of Korea. The modulated vector field articulated on the exterior enclosure correlates the level and direction of natural light penetration to the organizational spatial distribution of the interior spaces.

The Louis Vuitton Foundation was designed by Gehry Partners between 2006-2014. It is considered "a catalyst internationally for innovation in digital design and construction, setting a new standard for the use of advanced digital and fabrication technologies". The web-hosted, parametric, intelligently adaptable three-dimensional digital model enabled a team of over 400 people to contribute to it.

The largest of these projects is Dongdaemun Design Plaza, designed by Zaha Hadid Architects with Samoo, a major urban development landmark in Seoul, South Korea. The project resulted in the 2010 designation of Seoul as the World Design Capital. The most innovative state-of-the-art fabrication techniques were used in shaping the "45,000 aluminium panels of varying sizes and curvatures". The back-lit facade, "described by the designers as 'a field of pixilation and perforation patterns'...[transforms] from a solid entity by day into an animated light show by night".

Chhatrapati Shivaji International Airport Terminal 2 in Mumbai, India, designed by Skidmore Owings and Merrill and completed in 2014, serves over 40 million people yearly. The terminal is designed to accommodate traditional Indian departure and arrival ceremonies, and the complex veriagated patterns incorporated in the architecture at all scales are reminiscent of native regional patterns.

=== Parametricism 2.0 (2015–present ) ===
In a 2014 debate between Michael Hansmeyer and Patrik Schumacher of ZHA, part of "The New How" lecture series hosted by Alejandro Zaera-Polo at Princeton University School of Architecture, Schumacher introduced "Parametricism 2.0", the "upgraded" and now fully matured "Parametricism with parameters that matter". Schumacher emphasized that after two decades of cumulative build-up of knowledge and experience, Parametricism is now fully prepared to "go mainstream", fulfilling the full gamut of the societal tasks of architecture in the "organization and articulation" of the built environment, including tectonic articulation and environmental adaptation.

Examples of projects that fit the Parametricism 2.0 paradigm and are currently in the design phase include Google's California Headquarters by Bjarke Ingels (BIG) and Thomas Heatherwick (Heatherwick Studio), Beijing New Airport Terminal Building in Beijing China by Zaha Hadid Architects - which will be the world's biggest airport terminal, Harbin Cultural Center in Harbin, Heilongjiang, China by MAD Studio, and Earthly Pond Service Center International Horticultural Exposition by HHD-FUN.

== Outlook ==
Parametricism is a global architectural style that has converged rather than being invented. In Patrik Schumacher's view, parametricism is architecture's answer to our computationally powered network society, representing a paradigmatic shift in architecture after the collapse of the hegemonic style of Modernism, in response to the global shift from the Modernist era of Fordism (mass production) to the Post-Fordist era (mass customization). The style continues to evolve in an increasingly complex and fluid network of global communications. Parametricism evolves with the advancing computational design and fabrication technologies. e.g. multi-agent computational systems, genetic algorithms and robotic fabrication. However, it is imperative to state that the emergence of a new style does not occur solely as the outcome of innovation in the technological arena. "The intelligence that is able to invent and think through such correlations is prior to its computational implementation. And, to a limited extent there can be "computation without computers".

In 2020 the online platform Parametricism.com was launched, featuring writings and works of designers and architects affiliated with Parametricism. Curated by an international team consisting of Daniela Ghertovici (ArchAgenda, Chicago), Patrik Schumacher (Zaha Hadid Architects, London) and Lars van Vianen (Scape Agency, Amsterdam), the platform aims to discuss the current discourse and future direction of the style.

== See also ==
- Parametric design
- Generative design
- Design computing
- IJP The Book of Surfaces
