= General Organization for Social Insurance =

Saudi Arabian government agency

- المؤسسة العامة للتأمينات الاجتماعية

Agency overview
- Headquarters: Riyadh, Saudi Arabia
- Website: Official English Website

The General Organization for Social Insurance (GOSI) is a Saudi Arabian government agency concerned with social insurance in the country. GOSI is supervised by a board of eleven directors from government departments, employers and insured persons.

Calculations of GOSI are based on earning of an employee (basic salary + housing allowance) of a particular organization.

Calculations are divided into 3 categories:

1. GOSI for Saudi National
2. GOSI for GCC (Corporation Council for Arab States) Nationals
3. GOSI for Non-Saudi Nationals
