= Line 4 (Riyadh Metro) =

Metro line in Riyadh, Saudi Arabia

Yellow Line
- Riyadh Metro map

Overview
- Other name(s): Line 4
- Status: Operating
- Owner: Royal Commission for Riyadh City
- Locale: Riyadh, Saudi Arabia
- Termini: KAFD; Airport T1–2
- Stations: 9

Service
- Type: Rapid transit
- System: Riyadh Metro
- Rolling stock: Alstom Metropolis

History
- Opened: 1 December 2024; 4 months ago

Technical
- Line length: 29.6 kilometers (18.4 mi)
- Track gauge: 1,435 mm (4 ft 8 1/2 in)

The Yellow Line (Arabic: المسار الأصفر) or Line 4 is one of the Riyadh Metro network in Riyadh, Saudi Arabia. It runs from King Khalid International Airport to the King Abdullah Financial District (KAFD). It has 9 stations and 4 interchange stations, covering 29.6 km.

== Overview ==
It was built by a consortium of FCC, Atkins, Alstom, Samsung C&T, Strukton and TYPSA (Tecnica Y Proyectos).

== Route ==
Code	Station Name	Interchange station to
11	KAFD	KAFD Blue Line 13 and KAFD Purple Line 11
12	Ar Rabi	Purple Line Ar Rabi 12, Ar Rabi Interchange Bus Rapid Transit line 11 and Ar Rabi Interchange Blue Line Community Bus route 730
13	Uthman Bin Affan Road	Uthman Bin Affan Road Purple Line 13
14	SABIC	SABIC Purple Line 14
15	PNU	
16	Governmental Complex	
17	Airport T5	
18	Airport T3–4	
19	Airport T1–2	
