= Michael Hansmeyer =

Architect specializing in algorithmic architecture

- Education: Columbia University Graduate School of Architecture, Planning and Preservation
- Occupations: Architect, artist
- Buildings: Tor Alva
- Projects: Digital Grotesque, Digital Grotesque II

Michael Hansmeyer is a post-modern architect who utilizes algorithmic architecture techniques, generative art mentalities, and CAD software to generate complex structures.

== Life and career ==
He holds an MBA degree from INSEAD as well as a Master of Architecture degree from Columbia University. He previously worked with McKinsey & Company, J.P. Morgan, and at Herzog & de Meuron architects.

In 2010, he was based in the CAAD group at ETH's architecture department in Zurich.

He is known for using algorithms and computation to create complex architecture, with the components then 3-D printed to create sculptures, columns, and grottos.

Initially, he used cardboard and styrofoam to construct installations. His initial designs for 3-D printed installations were rejected by various 3-D printing companies, for being untenably complex. In 2013, however, he and Dillenburger developed a way to print with fine sand, which when mixed with a binder, became a form of standstone.

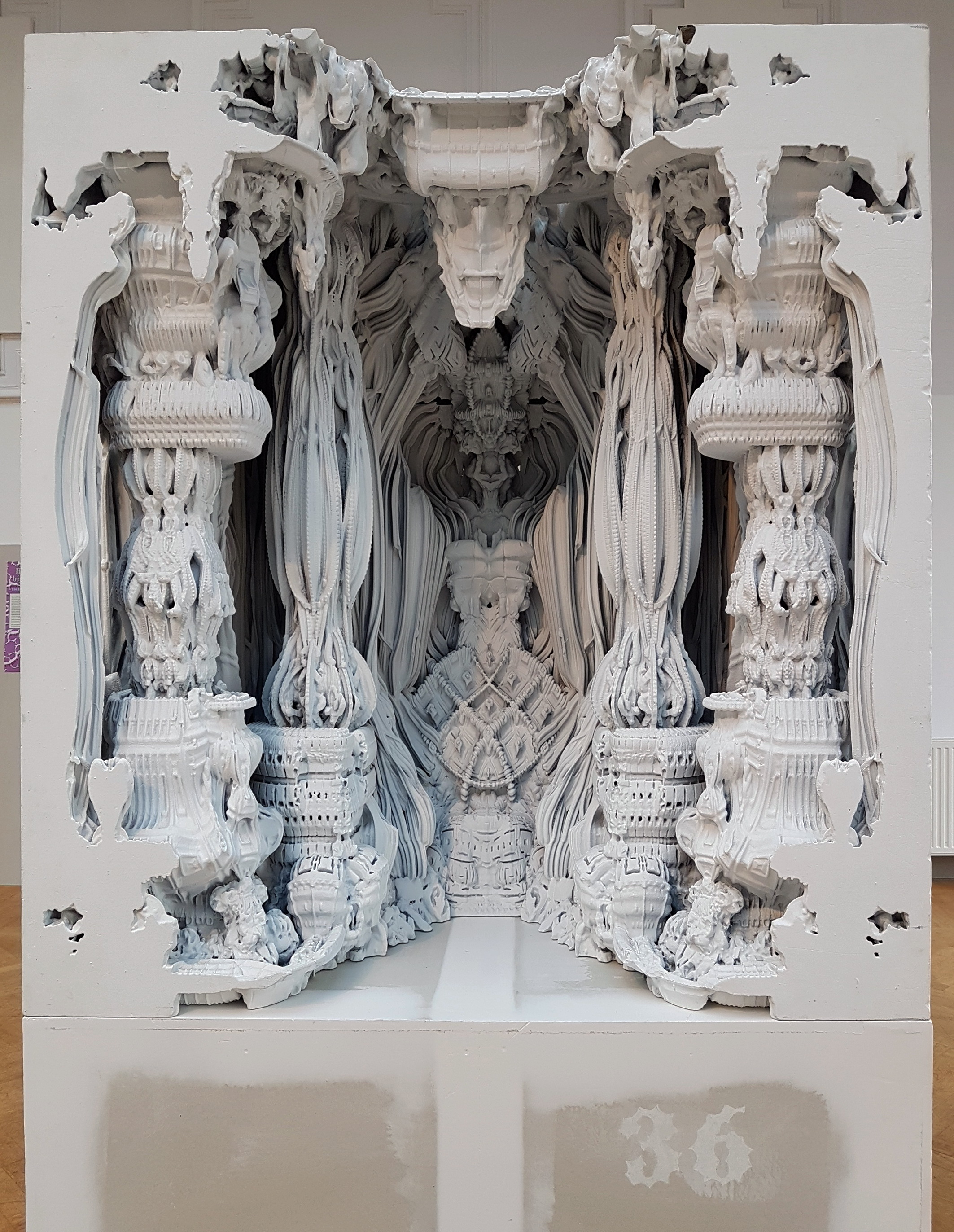
Digital Grotesque by Michael Hansmeyer and Benjamin Dillenburger

His first edition of the sculptural piece "Digital Grotesque" in 2013 was created using a sandstone printer. According to Wired, it had 260 million surfaces, 30 billion voxels, and required 78 gigabytes of hard drive space. The first "Digital Grotesque" was commissioned by FRAC Centre in Orléans, for its permanent collection. For "Grotto I" and "Grotto II," both part of Digital Grotesque, the design was processed with a supercomputer at ETH Zurich, with the images then combined in Photoshop.

In 2017, Grotto II was commissioned by the Centre Pompidou in Paris, with Hansmeyer again using a sandstone 3D printer that "used a subdivision-based algorithm able to create details as small as a grain of sand." Evoking stalactites and stalagmites, Grotto II weighed 7 metric tons, and had 1.3 billion individual surfaces.

The Centre Pompidou exhibit, "Digital Grotesque II", was 3.5 meters tall, and used seven tons of sandstone to construct the grotto. Created along with Benjamin Dillenburger, it involved two years of design development, then was printed in one month and assembled in two days.

In 2022, his project "Digital Grotesque III" premiered at Nowy Teatr in Warsaw.

In April 2024, he started construction on the "Tor Alva", a five story building designed along with Dillenburger to be the world's largest 3-D printed tower. to be used by the Nova Fundazium Origen foundation as a theater space in Mulegns in the Swiss Alps, it uses 3-D printed concrete reinforced with steel. Tor Alva was unveiled on May 20, 2025, with design credited to Hansmeyer, Dillenburger, and ETH Zurich.

== Architectural design projects ==
"L-Systems in Architecture (2003)" L-Systems in architecture applies Lindenmayer's L-system to mimic organic growth which is then adapted to architectural design requirements.

"Platonic Solids (2008)" "The Platonic Solids project explores how a purely operations-based geometric process can generate complex form." Hansmeyer explains this approach in his 2011 TED talk "Building Unimaginable Shapes".

"Subdivided Columns (2010)" Columns of incredible complexity and detail, made of thousands of stacked sheets of laser-cut greyboard or CNC-milled ABS plastic. Installations of columns were commissioned for the Gwangju Design Biennale 2011 and Grand Palais in Paris 2018. “[The columns] are an attempt to incorporate tools and technologies that can expand the scope of what is possible and what is imaginable and in the best case to create something that is not yet imaginable,” says Michael Hansmeyer in a 2011 article.

"Digital Grotesque (2013)" Exploring the dialectic between chaos and order, between the natural and the artificial, these full-scale, algorithmically generated grottos are fabricated out of 3D-printed sandstone. The first two grottos were commissioned by FRAC Orléans and Centre Pompidou for their architecture collections. An 18 meter wide, large-scale grotto was constructed for Romeo Castellucci’s rendition of the Magic Flute opera.

== See also ==
- Parametric architecture
- Alumni of Columbia University Graduate School of Architecture, Planning and Preservation
- Generative art
- List of TED speakers
