= ZHA Architects =

British architecture and design firm

- Type: Employee Benefit Trust (EBT)
- Industry: Architecture; Construction
- Founded: 1979; 47 years ago
- Headquarters: London, United Kingdom
- Key people: Zaha Hadid; Patrik Schumacher
- Number of employees: 500
- Website: zha.com

ZHA, officially ZHA Architects, and formerly Zaha Hadid Architects, is a British architecture and design firm founded by architect Zaha Hadid (1950–2016), with its main office in Clerkenwell, London.

== History ==
After the death of "starchitect" Hadid, Patrik Schumacher became head of the firm, which continued to trade under Hadid's name under a licensing agreement which involved paying a portion of turnover to the Zaha Hadid Foundation. At the time the company had a staff of 400, with 36 projects across 21 countries. The licensing agreement cost the firm £21.4m between 2018 and 2024, and it became embroiled in a court battle to terminate the agreement.

In the early 2020s, the firm designed a virtual city, Liberland Metaverse, based on the Liberland micronation and hosted on the Metaverse platform. The firm had in the 2020s turned to artificial intelligence to help in the design of workplaces; the firm created a dedicated internal unit called ZHAI (Zaha Hadid Analytics + Insights) to address AI utilization, something uncommon among peer firms.

In June 2026, the licensing agreement relating to the firm's continued use of Hadid's name was ended following a court ruling, and the firm rebranded as ZHA (company registered as ZHA Architects Ltd). It employs around 500 staff worldwide.

== Awards ==
=== 2022 ===
==== World Architecture Awards ====
- Realised Award Winning Architecture Projects: BEEAH Headquarters (United Arab Emirates)
- Designed Award Winning Architecture Projects: International Convention Centre and Theaters (French Polynesia)

==== Johnson Controls Blueprint of the Future Award ====
- BEEAH Headquarters (United Arab Emirates)

=== 2022 ===
==== UK Excellence in Design Award ====
- Infinitus Plaza (Guangzhou, China)

==== Architizer Awards A+ Awards ====
Jury Winner for Best Large Firm

Jury Winner for Architecture + Concrete: Striatus 3D Printed Bridge (Venice, Italy)

== Architectural work ==
=== Conceptual projects ===
- Price Tower extension hybrid project (2002), Bartlesville, Oklahoma – pending
- Guggenheim-Hermitage Vilnius, Vilnius, Lithuania, (2008–2012) – not realised
- Kartal-Pendik Waterfront Regeneration, Istanbul, Turkey
- Szervita Square bubble office building Budapest, Hungary – not realised
- Liberland Metaverse
- Dorobanti Tower, Bucharest, Romania - not realised
- Bishoftu International Airport, Bishoftu, Ethiopia – construction started

=== Major completed projects ===
Heydar Aliyev Cultural Centre in Baku, Azerbaijan

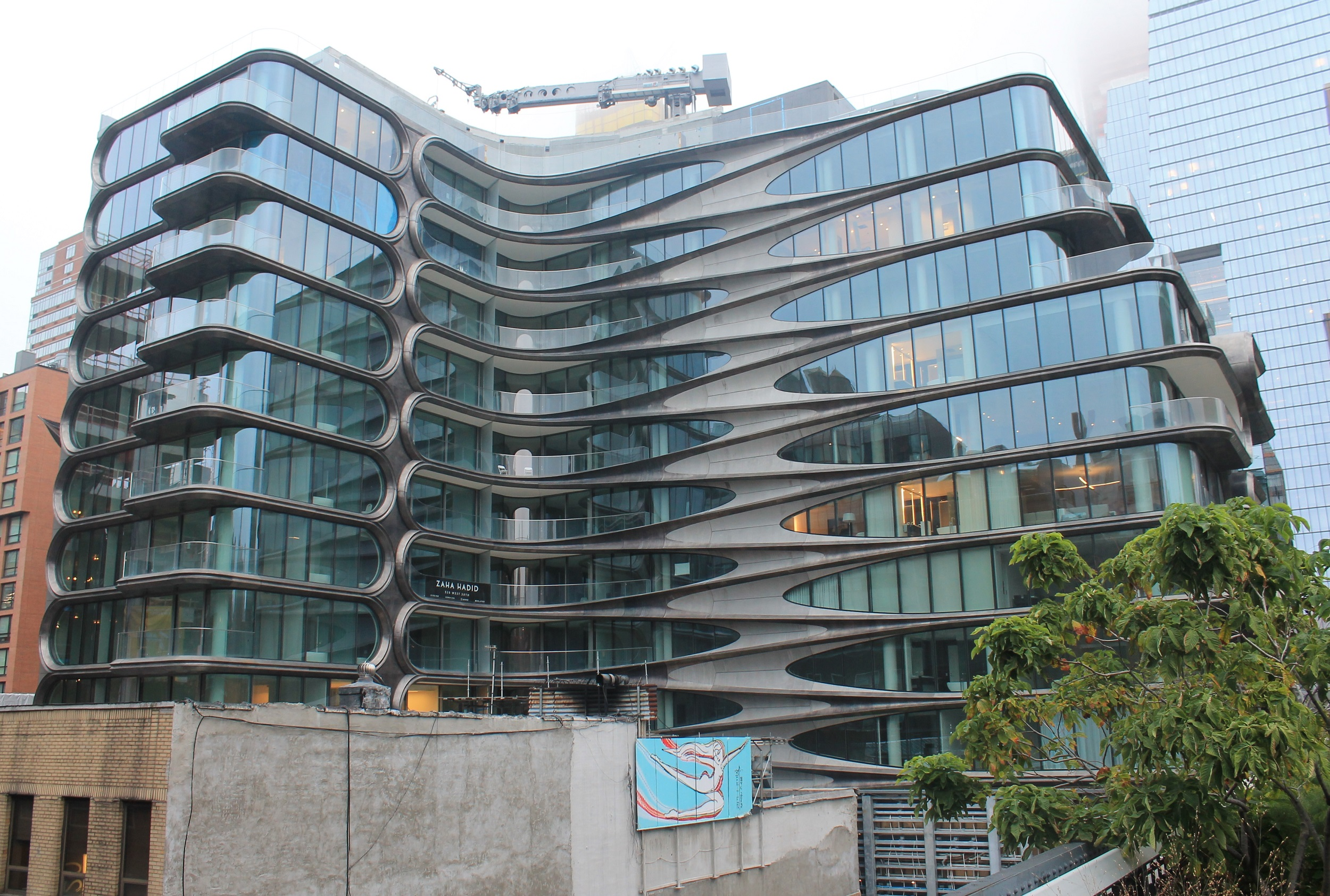
520 West 28th Street, Manhattan, New York City (2018)

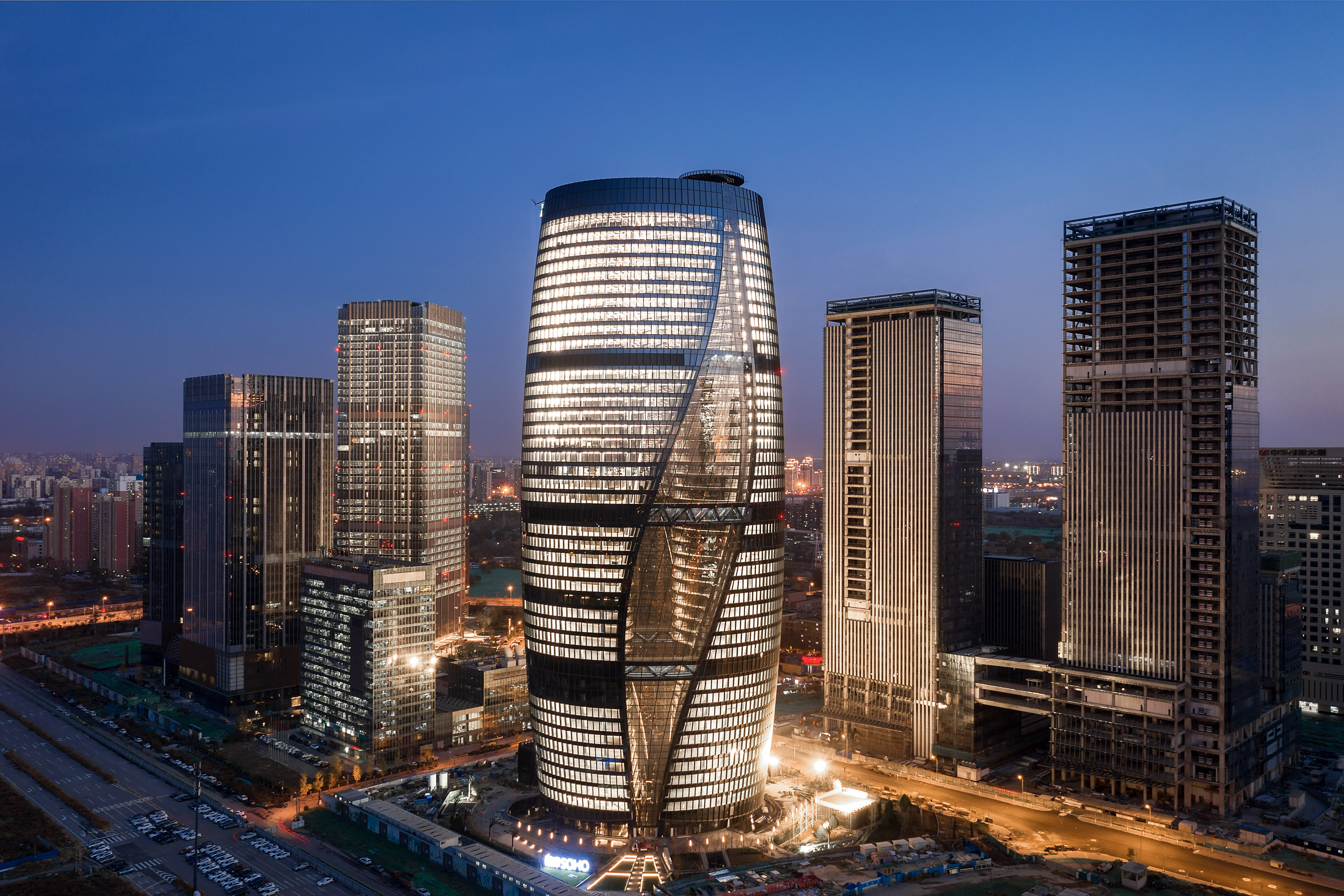
Leeza SOHO, Beijing, China (2019)

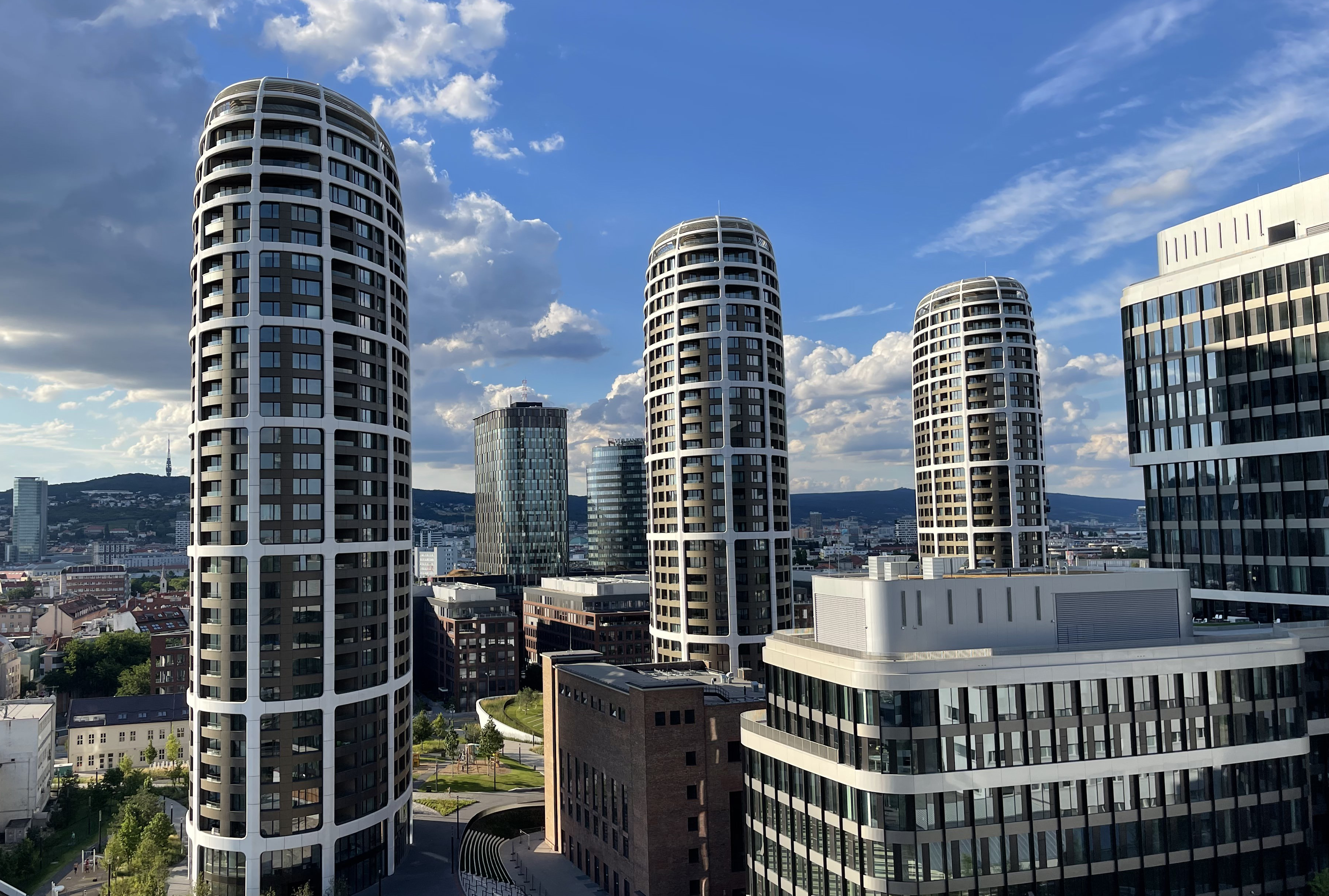
Sky Park Residence in Bratislava, Slovakia (2024)

- Vitra Fire Station (1994), Weil am Rhein, Germany
- Hoenheim-North Terminus & Car Park (2001), Hoenheim, France. Project architect: Stephane Hof
- Bergisel Ski Jump (2002), Innsbruck, Austria
- Rosenthal Center for Contemporary Art (2003), Cincinnati, Ohio, US
- BMW Central Building (2005), Leipzig, Germany
- Ordrupgaard annexe (2005), Copenhagen, Denmark
- Phaeno Science Center (2005), Wolfsburg, Germany
- Maggie's Centres at the Victoria Hospital (2006), Kirkcaldy, Scotland
- Tondonia Winery Pavilion (2001–2006), Haro, Spain
- Eleftheria square redesign (2007), Nicosia, Cyprus
- Hungerburgbahn new stations (2007), Innsbruck, Austria
- Chanel Mobile Art Pavilion (2006–2008), Tokyo, Hong Kong, New York City, London, Paris, Moscow
- Bridge Pavilion (2008), Zaragoza, Spain
- J. S. Bach Pavilion, Manchester International Festival (2009), Manchester, UK
- CMA CGM Tower (2007–2010), Marseille, France
- Pierres Vives (2002–2012), Montpellier, France
- MAXXI - National Museum of the 21st Century Arts (1998–2010), Rome, Italy. Stirling Prize 2010 winner.
- Guangzhou Opera House (2010), Guangzhou, People's Republic of China
- Riverside Museum (2011), a development of Glasgow Transport Museum, Scotland
- Heydar Aliyev Center (2007-2012), Baku, Azerbaijan
- Eli and Edythe Broad Art Museum, Michigan State University, (2008–2012)
- London Aquatics Centre (2012), London, UK, a 17,500-seat venue for the 2012 Summer Olympics
- Galaxy SOHO (2008-2012), Beijing, China
- Dongdaemun Design Plaza & Park (2008–2014), Seoul, South Korea
- Port Authority Building (2009-2016), Antwerp, Belgium
- Napoli Afragola railway station, Italy
- New Maritime Terminal in Salerno, Italy
- Citylife office tower (Storto) and residentials, Milan, Italy
- Morpheus (2018), Cotai, Macau
- 520 West 28th Street (2013-2018), Manhattan, New York City
- Beijing Daxing International Airport terminal building (2014–2019), Beijing, China
- Leeza SOHO (completed 2019), Beijing, China
- The Opus (2007-2020), Dubai, United Arab Emirates
- North Souks Department store (completed 2021), Beirut, Lebanon
- Infinitus Plaza (2022), Guangzhou, China
- BEEAH Headquarters (completed 2022), United Arab Emirates
- Jinwan Arts Center, Zhuhai, China (2023)
- Sky Park Residence, Bratislava, Slovakia (2024)
- KAFD Metro Station, Riyadh, Saudi Arabia (2024)
- The Henderson, Central, Hong Kong (2024)
- Danjiang Bridge, Taipei, Taiwan (2026)

=== Unfinished projects ===
- Mandarin Oriental Dellis Cay, Villa D (planned private home was targeted for completion 2010, but cancelled in 2011 following project bankruptcy), Dellis Cay, Turks and Caicos Islands.
- Nuragic and Contemporary Art Museum (2006) (on hold), Cagliari, Italy
- Tokyo National Olympic Stadium in Tokyo, Japan. (Scrapped in July 2015 by Prime Minister Shinzo Abe)

=== Ongoing and future projects ===
- Central Bank of Iraq Tower, Baghdad, Iraq (to be completed 2025).
- Fereshteh Pasargad Hotel, Tehran, Iran (to be completed by 2022).
- Central Business District Prague, Prague, Czech Republic (to be completed by 2023)
- Mercury Tower, St. Julian's, Malta (to be completed 2023)
- Navi Mumbai International Airport, Mumbai, India (Phase 1 opened in 2025)
- Go Park SAI SHA, Sai Kung, Hong Kong (to be completed 2024)
- International Gateway Centre (IGC), West Kowloon, Hong Kong (to be completed 2025)
- Western Sydney Airport, Sydney, Australia (Phase 1 to open in 2026)
- Sky Park Tower, Bratislava, Slovakia (2027)
- Chongqing Jiangbei International Airport Terminal 3B, Chongqing, China
- Chengdu Science Fiction Museum (in construction, 2022), Chengdu, China
- Oppo Headquarters, Shenzhen, China (to be completed by 2025)
- Rail Baltica Ülemiste main railway terminal, Tallinn, Estonia (to be completed by 2030)
- Port of Tallinn Masterplan 2030 for the Old City Harbour, Tallinn, Estonia (to be completed by 2030)
- Unicorn Island planned development, Chengdu, China
- Start-Up Exhibition and Conference Centre, Chengdu, China
- Tower C at Shenzhen Bay Super Headquarters Base, Shenzhen, China (to be completed by 2027)
- Vilnius Railway Station "Green Connect", Vilnius, Lithuania
- Surfside condominium site redevelopment, Surfside, Florida
- International Convention Centre and Theaters (designed 2022), French Polynesia
- Discovery City, Ibrahim Technopolis, Malaysia
- Skovens Arena, Aarhus, Denmark (to be opened 2026)
