= Medina Metro =

Planned Rapid transit system in Medina, Saudi Arabia

Overview
- Native name: قطار المدينة المنورة
- Owner: Medina Development Authority
- Locale: Medina
- Transit type: Rapid transit
- Number of lines: 3 (projected)

Technical
- System length: 95 km (59 mi) (projected)

The Medina Metro (Note: Arabic: قطار المدينة (romanized: Qiṭār al-Madīnah)) is a proposed three-line metro system planned for the city of Medina, Saudi Arabia.

== History ==
On 4 November 2013, the Saudi Council of Ministers announced plans to build a metro in Medina within eight years. A committee to oversee the project was chaired by the then Governor of Medina Province, Faisal bin Salman.

In March 2015, the Medina Development Authority awarded a 12‑month contract to the French companies Systra (consortium leader) and Egis Group to conduct feasibility studies and produce a preliminary design for the network.

As of the most recent public information, construction has not yet begun, and the project remains in the planning and design phase.

== Network ==
- Line 1
- Line 2
- Line 3

Total route length of 95 km (25 km underground, 48 km elevated).

== See also ==
- Transport in Saudi Arabia
- Rail transport in Saudi Arabia
- Haramain High Speed Railway
- Sacred Sites Metro Line
- Riyadh Metro
- Jeddah Metro
- Mecca Metro
- Sharqia Metro
