= Sharqia Metro =

Planned Rapid transit system in Eastern Province, Saudi Arabia

Overview
- Native name: قطار الشرقية
- Area served: Dammam metropolitan area
- Transit type: Rapid transit
- Number of lines: 2 (projected)

Technical
- System length: 86 km (53 mi) (projected)

The Sharqia Metro (Note: In Arabic: قطار الشرقية (romanized: Qiṭār Ash-Sharqiyah); Sharqia means "Eastern". The system is also known as the Dammam Metro (Arabic: قطار الدمام (romanized: Qiṭār ad-Dammām)) is a proposed metro system planned for the Dammam metropolitan area, Eastern Province, Saudi Arabia.

== History ==
The Sharqia Metro, also referred to as the Dammam Metro, was approved by the Saudi Council of Ministers on 19 May 2014 as part of a plan to develop an integrated public transport system for the Dammam metropolitan area in the Eastern Province. The project was planned to include 50 km of light rail, 110 km of bus rapid transit, and 350 km of feeder bus routes to connect suburban and peripheral areas. A private company was established to oversee its implementation and coordination.

The light rail network was designed to consist of two lines. The first line was intended to link Tarout Island with the King Fahd Causeway, passing through Qatif, Dammam, and Dhahran, while the second line was planned to connect King Fahd Road in Dammam with King Fahd International Airport. Preliminary studies were carried out to determine the final alignments and station locations, which were expected to take approximately 18 months.

By 2017, the project had been structured to proceed as a public–private partnership, as announced by the President of the Public Transport Authority, in line with the government’s approach to major transport infrastructure projects in the region.

In 2022, the Mayor of the Eastern Province stated that work on the project was on hold.

== See also ==
- Transport in Saudi Arabia
- Rail transport in Saudi Arabia
- Haramain High Speed Railway
- Sacred Sites Metro Line
- Riyadh Metro
- Medina Metro
- Mecca Metro
- Jeddah Metro
