= Jeddah Metro =

Planned Rapid transit system in Jeddah, Saudi Arabia

Overview
- Native name: قطار جدة
- Owner: Jeddah Transport Company
- Locale: Jeddah
- Transit type: Rapid transit
- Number of lines: 4 (projected)
- Number of stations: 81 (projected)
- Website: Jeddah Metro

Technical
- System length: 108 Km (67 mi) (projected)
- Track gauge: 1,435 mm (4 ft 8 1/2 in) (standard gauge)

The Jeddah Metro (Note: Arabic: قطار جدة (romanized: Qiṭār Jiddah)) is a proposed metro system planned for the city of Jeddah, Saudi Arabia.

== History ==
The Jeddah Metro project was approved by the Saudi Council of Ministers in March 2013 as part of the Integrated Public Transport Plan (IPTP) for Jeddah. A budget of SAR 45 billion was allocated for the wider public transport programme, and the Metro Jeddah Company (MJC) was established to oversee planning, development and procurement.

In 2014, Foster + Partners was appointed to develop the architectural master plan for the network, including station design, rolling stock concepts and system branding. The engineering consultancy Systra was commissioned to undertake preliminary engineering and infrastructure design. During this phase, a modular station concept featuring white concrete arches was developed to provide shading and passive climate control.

After 2016, progress slowed as national infrastructure priorities shifted toward other transport and development projects, including the Haramain High Speed Railway. Although the metro remained part of long-term urban transport strategies aligned with Saudi Vision 2030, and following a decline in oil prices, tendering for major construction packages was postponed.

In January 2026, a new tender was issued for the Blue Line, planned as the first phase of the network. The proposed 35 km line is intended to link King Abdulaziz International Airport with the Haramain High Speed Railway station. Planning efforts have focused on updating earlier designs and integrating the line with the Jeddah Central development.

== See also ==
- Transport in Saudi Arabia
- Rail transport in Saudi Arabia
- Haramain High Speed Railway
- Sacred Sites Metro Line
- Riyadh Metro
- Medina Metro
- Mecca Metro
- Sharqia Metro
