= As sudayrah =

As sudayrah may refer to:

- As sudayrah, Makkah
- As sudayrah, Al Madinah
