= Haylat Radi al Baham =

- Village
- Location in Saudi Arabia
- Coordinates: 24°5′2″N 39°43′30″E
- Country: Saudi Arabia
- Province: Al Madinah Province
- Time zone: UTC+3 (EAT)
  - Summer (DST): UTC+3 (EAT)

Haylat Radi al Baham is a village in Al Madinah Province, in western Saudi Arabia.

== See also ==
- List of cities and towns in Saudi Arabia
- Regions of Saudi Arabia
