= Baqaa, Medina Province =

Baqʽaʼ
- Village
- Location in Saudi Arabia
- Coordinates: 24°13′0″N 38°43′0″E
- Country: Saudi Arabia
- Province: Al Madinah Province
- Time zone: UTC+3 (EAT)
  - Summer (DST): UTC+3 (EAT)

Baqʽaʼ (بقعاء) is a village in Al Madinah Province, in western Saudi Arabia.

== See also ==
- List of cities and towns in Saudi Arabia
- Regions of Saudi Arabia
