= ʽUshayrah =

`Ushayrah
- Village
- Location in Saudi Arabia
- Coordinates: 24°01′07″N 39°40′23″E
- Country: Saudi Arabia
- Province: Al Madinah Province
- Time zone: UTC+3 (EAT)
  - Summer (DST): UTC+3 (EAT)

`Ushayrah is a village in Al Madinah Province, in western Saudi Arabia.

== See also ==
- List of cities and towns in Saudi Arabia
- Regions of Saudi Arabia
