= Mahd Al-Dhahab =

Gold mining area in the Arabian Peninsula

Coordinates: 23°30′12.96″N 40°51′34.92″E

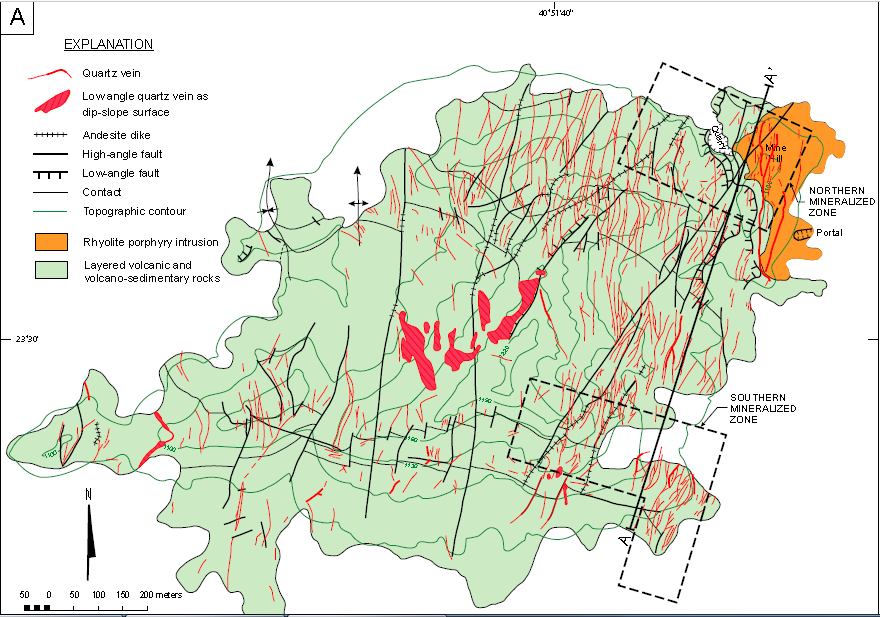
Mahd adh-Dhahab gold deposit geological map

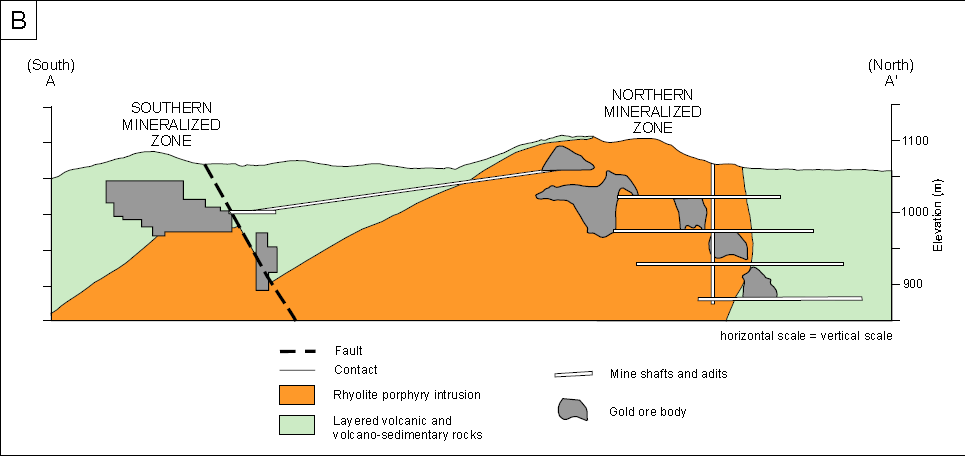
Mahd adh-Dhahab gold mining cross section

The Mahd adh-Dhahab (Arabic: مَهْدُ ٱلذَّهَب, “Cradle of the gold”), is a small gold mining town in the Arabian Peninsula, connected to the Mecca–Medina highway. It is located in the Medina Province in the Ḥijāz in Saudi Arabia.

Gold was first mined in Arabia c. 30th century BC. A second period of activity was during the Abbasid Caliphate between 750 and 1258. The latest activities, by the Saudi Mining Company began in 1936 using both open-pit and underground mines at Mahd adh-Dhahab. The Saudi Directorate General of Mineral Resources carried out further gold exploration in the 1970s, following the 1971 suspension of the US$-gold exchange rate and the consequent rise in value of the metal. Gold mining is done today by the Saudi Mining Company. The mine will close in 2023 as now only low-grade gold is being mined because of the depleting resources.

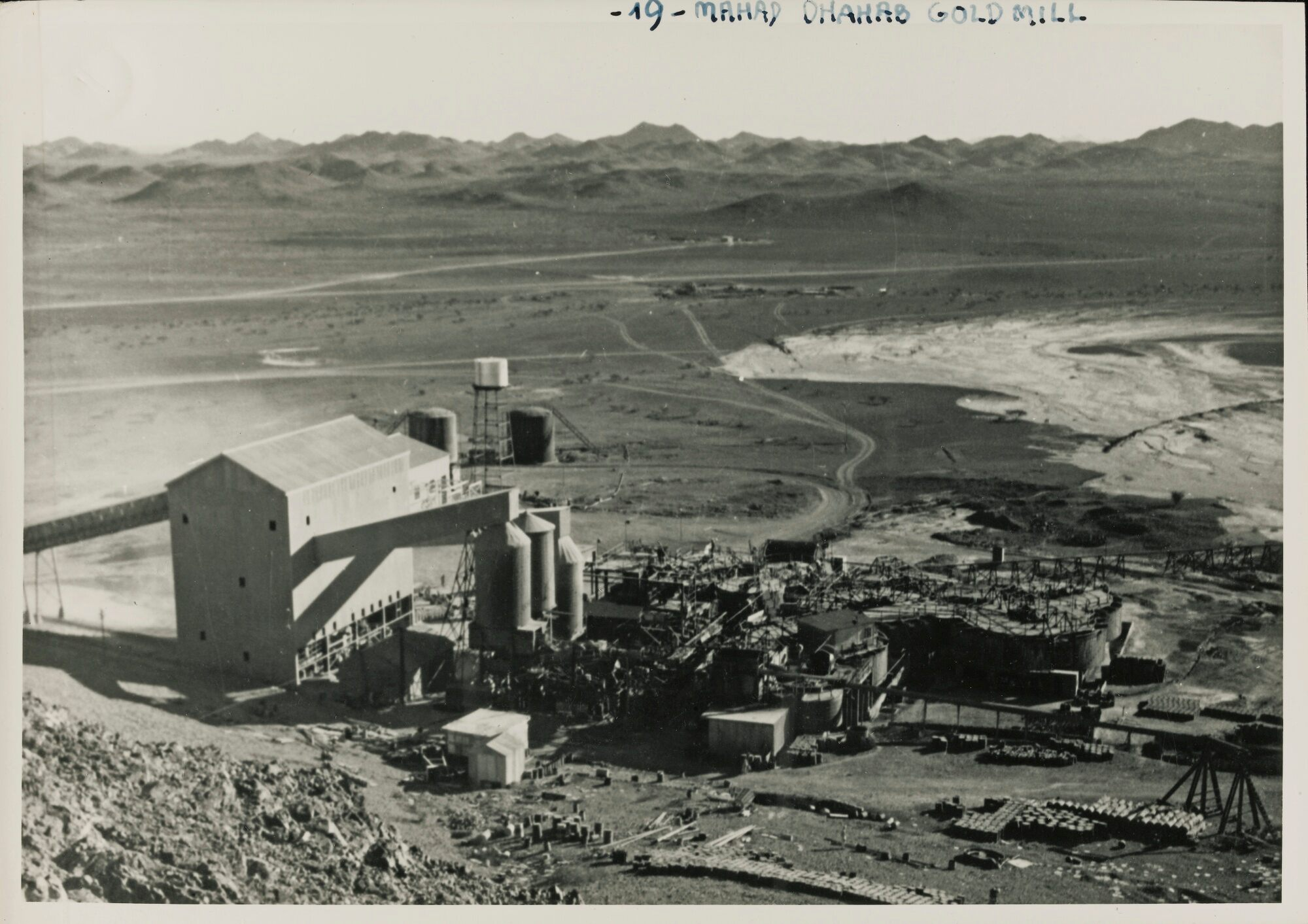
Gold Mill in Mahd adh-Dhahab, circa 1941
