= COPASA =

Spanish construction company

S.A. de Obras y Servicios, COPASA
- Formerly: Construcciones Paraño, S.A.
- Type: Sociedad anónima
- Industry: Civil engineering
- Founded: Ourense, Spain (February 20, 1985)
- Founder: José Luis Suárez Gutiérrez
- Headquarters: Ourense, Spain
- Area served: Worldwide
- Key people: José Luis Suárez Gutiérrez, Chairman
- Services: Highway preservation, Car park operation
- Website: www.copasa.es

S.A. de Obras y Servicios, COPASA is a Spanish construction company specializing in civil engineering projects. The company was founded in 1985 as Construcciones Paraño, S.A. (Copasa).

== Projects ==
=== Vigo Airport ===
In 2010, a joint-bid by Copasa and San José resulted in the awarding of the contract for the Vigo Airport terminal expansion, worth 45 million euros.

=== Haramain High Speed Rail Project ===
Copasa was one of numerous Spanish businesses awarded a contract by the Saudi government for the Haramain High Speed Rail Project.
