= MVA Asia =

MVA
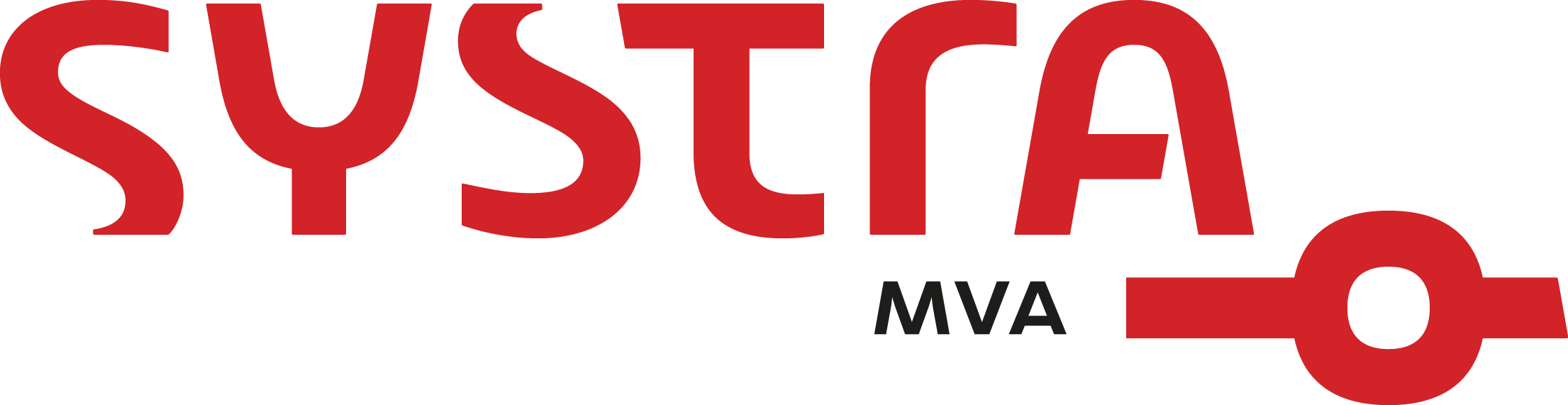
- Company type: Private
- Industry: Engineering
- Founded: 1968 (first established in Asia in 1978)
- Headquarters: Wong Chuk Hang, Hong Kong
- Number of locations: Hong Kong; China; Singapore; Thailand; India; Vietnam; Indonesia; Malaysia; Philippines; Australia; New Zealand
- Area served: Worldwide
- Key people: Ian McGovern (CEO); Ir Francis Sootoo (director)
- Services: Transportation, Planning and Management Consultant
- Number of employees: 350 (Aug 2021)
- Parent: SYSTRA
- Website: www.mvaasia.com

MVA is a transportation, planning and management consultant established in Asia in 1978. Headquartered in Hong Kong, it operates in Hong Kong, China, Singapore, Thailand, India, Vietnam, Indonesia, Malaysia, the Philippines, Australia and New Zealand. It is part of the SYSTRA group.

Its head office is in the Genesis Building in Wong Chuk Hang, Hong Kong Island.

== History ==
MVA started in 1968 as "Alan M. Voorhees and Associates", a UK subsidiary of American Transport Consultants, and was appointed to undertake a transport study for Tyne and Wear Metropolitan Council. Brian Martin, who had been Greater London Council (GLC)'s Chief Transport Planner, was appointed as Managing Director of Voorhees' UK operations and after some years the company was renamed Martin and Voorhees Associates in recognition of his role.

In 1983, the management of Martin and Voorhees Associates bought the company from its American owners and the company's name was changed to MVA.

== Services ==
MVA provides consulting services in Asia region for on traffic engineering, transport planning & management and market & business research, for both public and private sectors with specialisation on:

- Land-use Development and Master Planning
- Transport Planning and Policy
- Sustainable Transport
- Traffic and Highway Engineering
- Rail Planning and Station Design
- Public Transport
- Non-Motorised Transport (NMT)
- Transport Investment Projects
- Transport Modelling and Simulation
- Business, Market and Social Research

== Awards ==
MVA as Traffic Consultant:

- 2021 RIBA International Awards for Excellence - Tai Kwun - The Centre for Heritage and Arts
- 2020 Quality Building Award - Hong Kong Children's Hospital
- 2020 HKIA Merit Award of Mixed-Uses(es) Building - Tai Kwun - The Centre for Heritage and Arts
- 2020 HKIA Special Award of Heritage & Adaptive Re-use - Tai Kwun - The Centre for Heritage and Arts
- 2019 HKIA Merit Award of Hong Kong – Community - West Kowloon Cultural District - Xiqu Centre
- 2019 Green Building Award - Merit Award - Phase III Campus Development for OUHK
- 2018 Strategic Cooperation Excellence Award - Shenzhen Prince Bay Area
- 2014 Green Building Award - THEi New Campus at Chai Wan
- 2014 MTR Grand Safety Award - SCL 1109 Stations and Tunnels of Kowloon City Section
- 2014 Quality Building Award - The New Campuses of Hong Kong Design Institute & Hong Kong Institute of Vocational Education (Lee Wai Lee)
