= Mecca Metro =

Rapid transit in Saudi Arabia

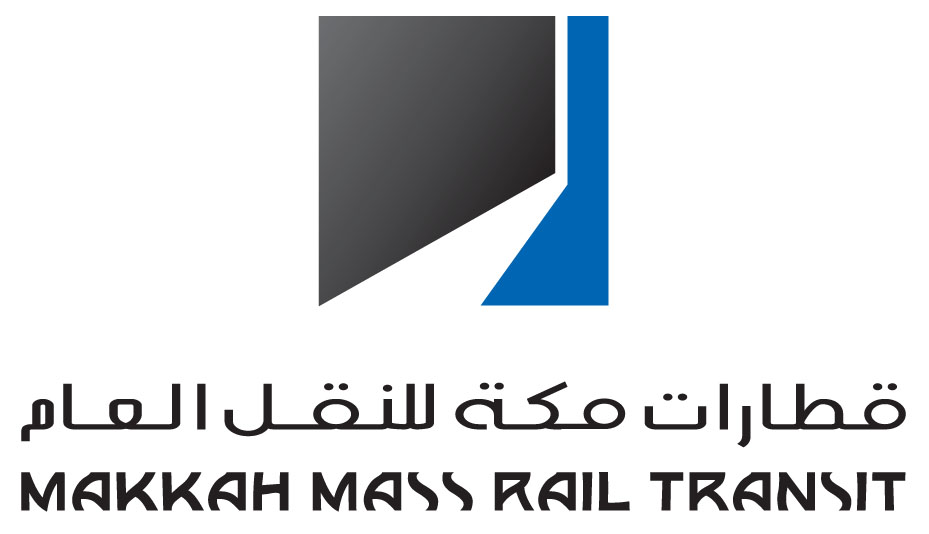

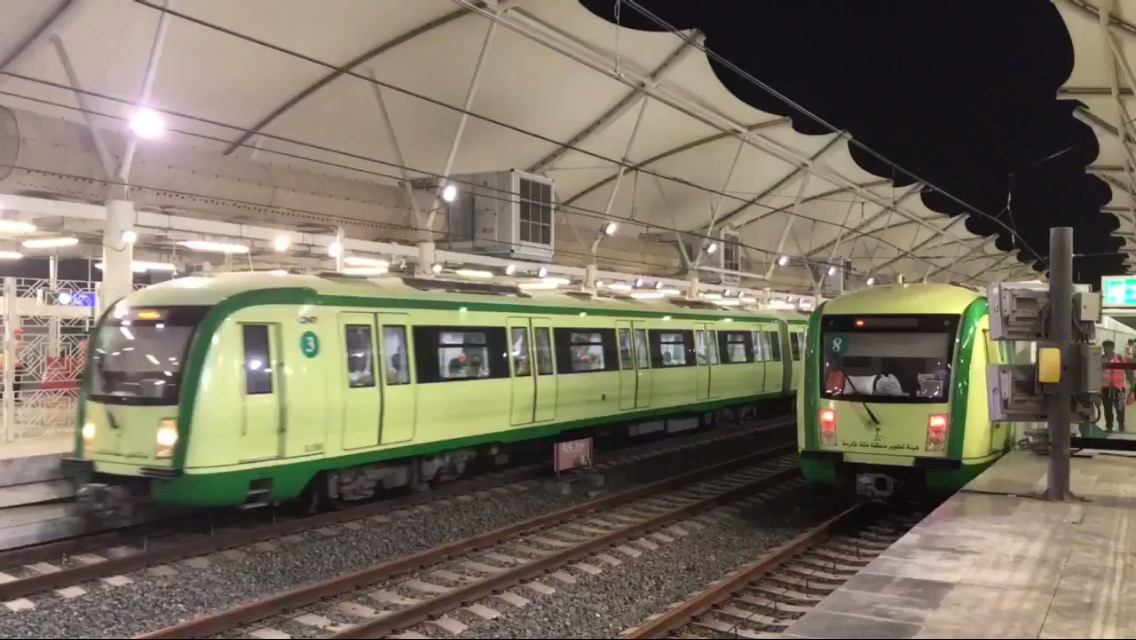

Overview
- Native name: قطارات مكة للنقل العام
- Locale: Mecca
- Transit type: Rapid Transit
- Number of lines: 1 – Al Mashaaer Al Mugaddassah Metro line (shuttle train for Hajj pilgrims); 3 (projected)
- Number of stations: Line S – 9 Line A B C D – 81 (projected)

Operation
- Began operation: November 13, 2010; 16 years ago

Technical
- System length: 18.1 km (11.2 mi) (operational); 188 km (117 mi) (projected)
- Track gauge: 1,435 mm (4 ft 8 1/2 in) standard gauge

The Mecca Metro or Makkah Metro is a metro system with four planned lines in the city of Mecca, Saudi Arabia. The Metro was constructed by China Railway Construction Corporation and is run by Mecca Mass Rail Transit Company (MMRTC). The metro forms part of the 62-billion-riyal Mecca Public Transport Programme (MPTP), which will include integrated bus services.

The four proposed metro lines will be in addition to the existing Al Mashaer Al Mugaddassah Metro line: 18.1 km, connecting Mecca, Arafat, Muzdalifa, and Mina opened in November 2010.

Many people utilize the Mecca Metro during the Hajj.

== Planning ==
In August 2012, it was announced that the Saudi government had approved a US$16.5 billion budget to build four metro lines (182 kilometers (113 mi)) of the system. The announcement gave an estimated time period to completion of 10 years. Invitations for tenders were due to be issued in January 2013.

Four new lines are to be built.

- Line A : will connect Mecca to large multilevel parking facilities from the south to the northeast.
- Line B : is a straight link between Mina and Mecca and continues parallel to the HHSR into the southwest.
- Line C : will connect Arafat and Mina to the west side of Mecca and continues to the northwest.
- Line D : will connect the south to Mecca with a straight extension to the west.

Work on the 188-kilometer (117 mi) long metro network with 87 new stations had been expected to commence construction in 2015, then in 2016, but had not started ever since. After a failed tender in 2017, the Saudi government restarted the project in summer 2024 by ordering a feasibility study on phase 1 of the project. This phase with a US$8 billion budget covers planned line B and most parts of line C, while line A will be in the second phase, and line D plus a northern extension of line C will be part of phase 3.

MMRTC has appointed Prasarana Malaysia to provide consultancy services during Phase 1, which covers the construction of two metro lines, totaling 45.1 km and 22 stations by 2019, But never came into frution.

== See also ==
- Jeddah Metro
- Madinah Metro
- Riyadh Metro
- Haramain High Speed Railway
- Al Mashaaer Al Mugaddassah Metro line
