= Medina Development Authority =

Agency overview
- Formed: 2009; 17 years ago
- Agency executive: Salman bin Sultan, Chairman
- Website: www.mda.gov.sa

Medina Development Authority, officially "Al Madinah Region Development Authority (MDA)", is the upper body of the Medina Province in Saudi Arabia. It is a governmental agency. MDA is responsible for developing a comprehensive plan for the province, preparing the city of Medina for visitors, and meeting the expectations of its residents and guests.

== Public Transportation Program ==
MMDA concluded an agreement to implement a large-scale transportation infrastructure project in the city of Medina for the total cost of $100 million. The project includes constructing new roads network as well as building infrastructure for buses and trains.

== See also ==
- List of Municipalities and Development Authorities in Saudi Arabia
