= Systra =

French multinational transit company

SYSTRA

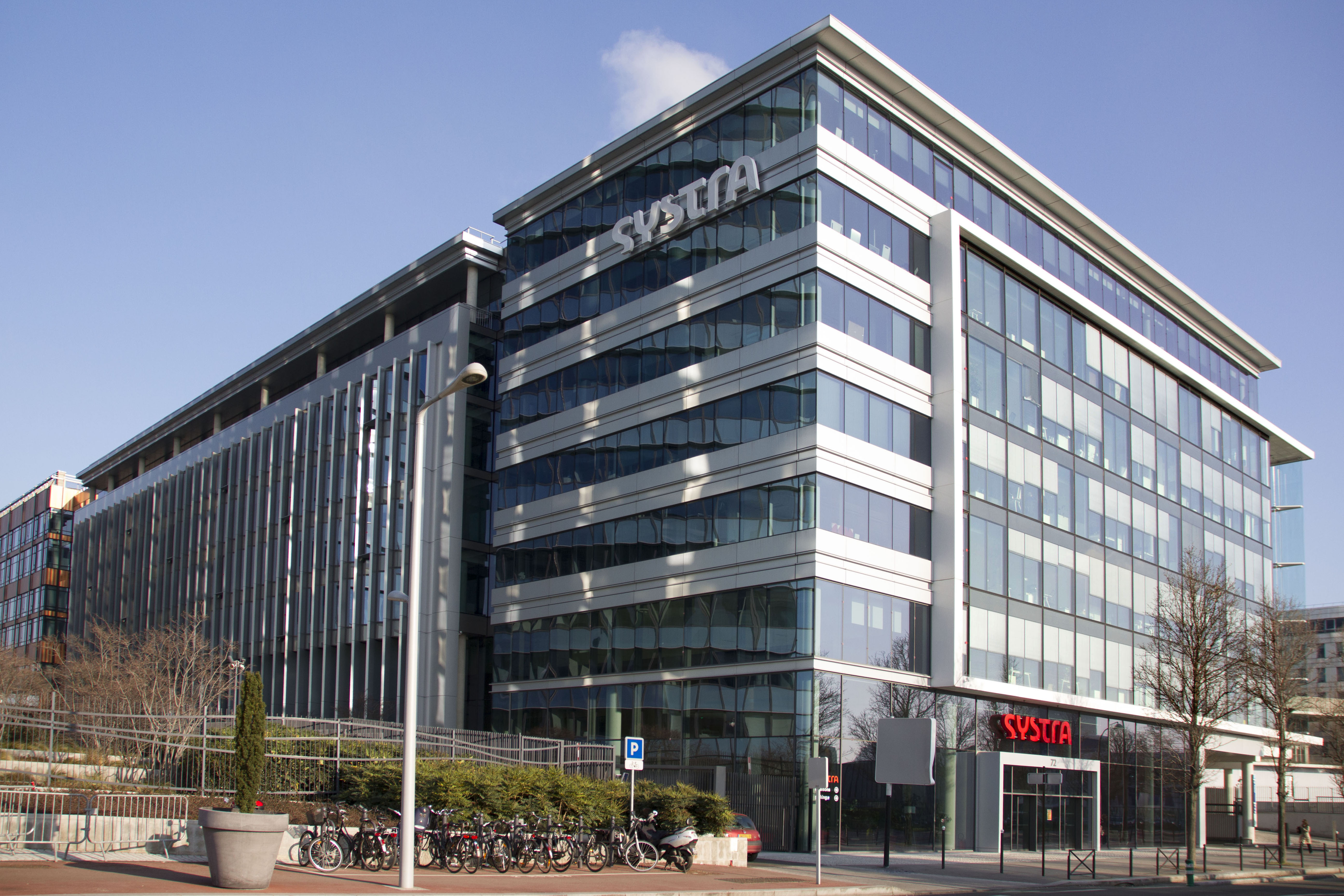
- SYSTRA's head office in Paris
- Industry: Mass Transit and Rail
- Founded: 1957
- Headquarters: Paris, France
- Area served: Worldwide
- Key people: Jean-Charles Vollery (CEO), Arnaud Jeudy (Chief Finance and Administration Officer)
- Services: Engineering and consulting group in the transportation and mobility sector
- Revenue: €631M in 2019, of which 2/3 abroad
- Net income: €4.5M in 2018
- Owner: Latour Capital; FIMALAC; RATP (20%); SNCF (20%); Employees (2%)
- Number of employees: 10,900
- Subsidiaries: MVA Hong Kong; SYSTRA Consulting; SYSTRA Canada; SAI; SYSTRA Brasil; SYSTRA Dalco Elteknik; SYSTRA Scott Lister; SYSTRA JMP Consultants; SYSTRA SIAS Transport Planners; SYSTRA SWS; SYSTRA Norway
- Website: www.systra.com

SYSTRA is a multinational engineering and consulting group in the mobility sector, whose fields of activity include rail and public transport. SYSTRA employs about 10,900 people worldwide, and is a limited company which shareholders include French national railway company SNCF, RATP, and various banks.

== History ==
=== French engineering ===
SYSTRA was founded in 1957, when the SNCF created SOFRERAIL (French Company for Railway Design and Construction). Four years later, the RATP also creates its own engineering branch : SOFRETU (French Company for Public Transport Design and Construction). SOFRERAIL and SOFRETU merge in 1995, originally under the name SYSTRA-Sofretu-Sofrerail, later shortened to SYSTRA in 1997.

In June 2011, INEXIA (engineering branch of the SNCF) and XELIS (the 2006 launched engineering branch of the RATP) both join SYSTRA. The merger was ratified on 1 July 2012.

=== International acquisitions and development ===
Created as an international company, SYSTRA quickly developed a network of branches and subsidiaries in more than 50 countries.

In 1995, the acquisition of the MVA group gives SYSTRA a consulting base in the United Kingdom, Hong Kong, and the Middle East.

During 1990, the CANARAIL subsidiary was created in Montreal (now known as SYSTRA Canada). In 1994, the company's US branch opens in New York City under the name of SYSTRA Consulting.

In 2000, the Italian railway and urban transport engineering services company SOTECNI joined SYSTRA, being rebranded as SYSTRA SOTECNI.

During 2006, after 50 years of presence in India, SYSTRA India is created in Delhi; it was further developed with the acquisition of the Indian engineering office SAI in 2014.

In 2015, SYSTRA purchased JMP Consultants Ltd, a British company that specializes in engineering and transport planning consulting. Later that same year, SYSTRA bought Tectran, strengthening its presence in the Brazilian market. During 2016, SYSTRA acquires four new subsidiaries: Dalco Elteknik AB (a Swedish rail engineering company), Scott Lister (an Australian company specialized in system engineering and risk management), SIAS Transport Planners (A British company specialized in transport planning consulting) and VETEC (a Brazilian road and rail transport engineering and consulting company).

In September 2017, the group strengthens its "bridges and civil engineering structures" department by acquiring the California-based company International Bridge Technologies. Its Brazilian subsidiaries Tectran and VETEC merged at the end of that same year.

In 2019, SYSTRA acquired TSP Projects in the UK and C&S Conseils in France.

During 2021, SYSTRA acquired the Italian-based SWS Engineering.

In 2023, SYSTRA acquired the Swedish, Danish, and Norwegian entities of Atkins, Rail Systems Australia (a rail signalling firm), Bamser (an Australian tunnel engineering firm), and Subterra (a tunnel engineering firm based in Spain and Latin America).

During 2024, SYSTRA dismissed an employee for raising safety concerns in response to pressure by Peter Hendy, chairman of Network Rail.

In October 2024, Latour Capital and FIMALAC acquired a combined 58% shareholding. RATP and SNCF each retained 20% with the remaining 2% held by Systra employees.

In 2025, SYSTRA acquired the Spanish company Ardanuy Ingeniería and the Australian company BG&E.

== Markets and services ==
The company works together with industrial groups or equipment companies. It acts as a consultant in the public transportation sector, or as a provider of operation services for managing companies. As such, SYSTRA works equally as a subcontractor for private clients and public clients.

SYSTRA segments its activity by expertise and sector.

Markets:

- Urban Transit (Metro, Light rail, Bus rapid transit, Urban cable cars, Monorail, Micro Mobilities & Cycle, Disruptive Transport)
- Metros
- Rail (High Speed Rail, Conventional Rail, Freight)
- Stations & Buildings (Stations, Technical Buildings, Depot Facilities & Operation Control Centres)
- Tunnels & Bridges (Bridges & Viaducts, Tunnels & Underground Structures)
- Systems Engineering (System Integration, System Assurance, Control & Communications, Power, O&M, Rolling Stock & Depots)
- Roads and highways
- Urban Infrastructures/Real Estate, Logistics
- Mining
- Airports, Ports, and Marine

Services:

- Cybersecurity
- Planning & Consulting
- Design
- Project Management & Construction
- Testing & Commissioning
- Asset Management & O&M Assistance

== Projects ==
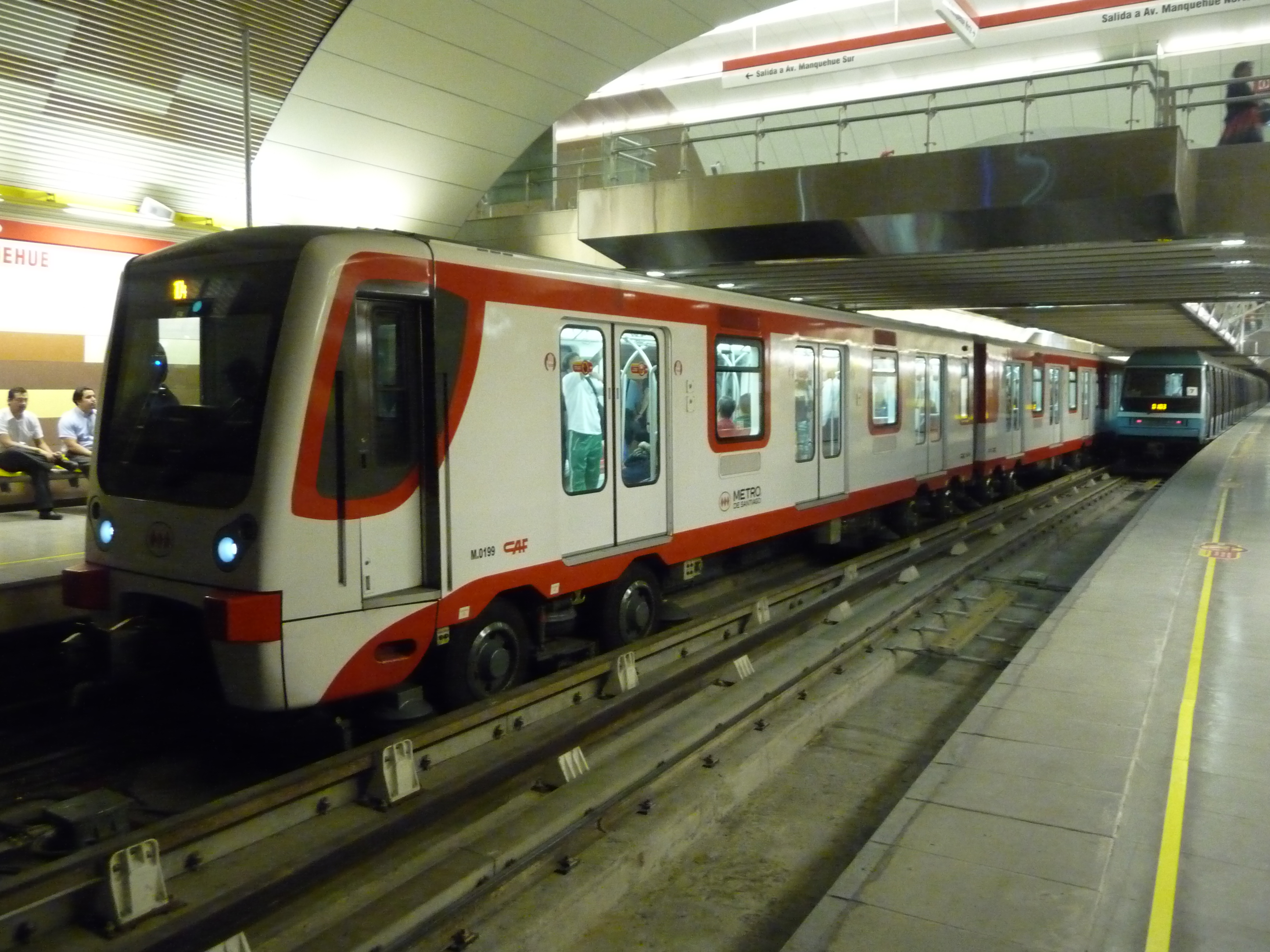
Santiago Metro, Chile

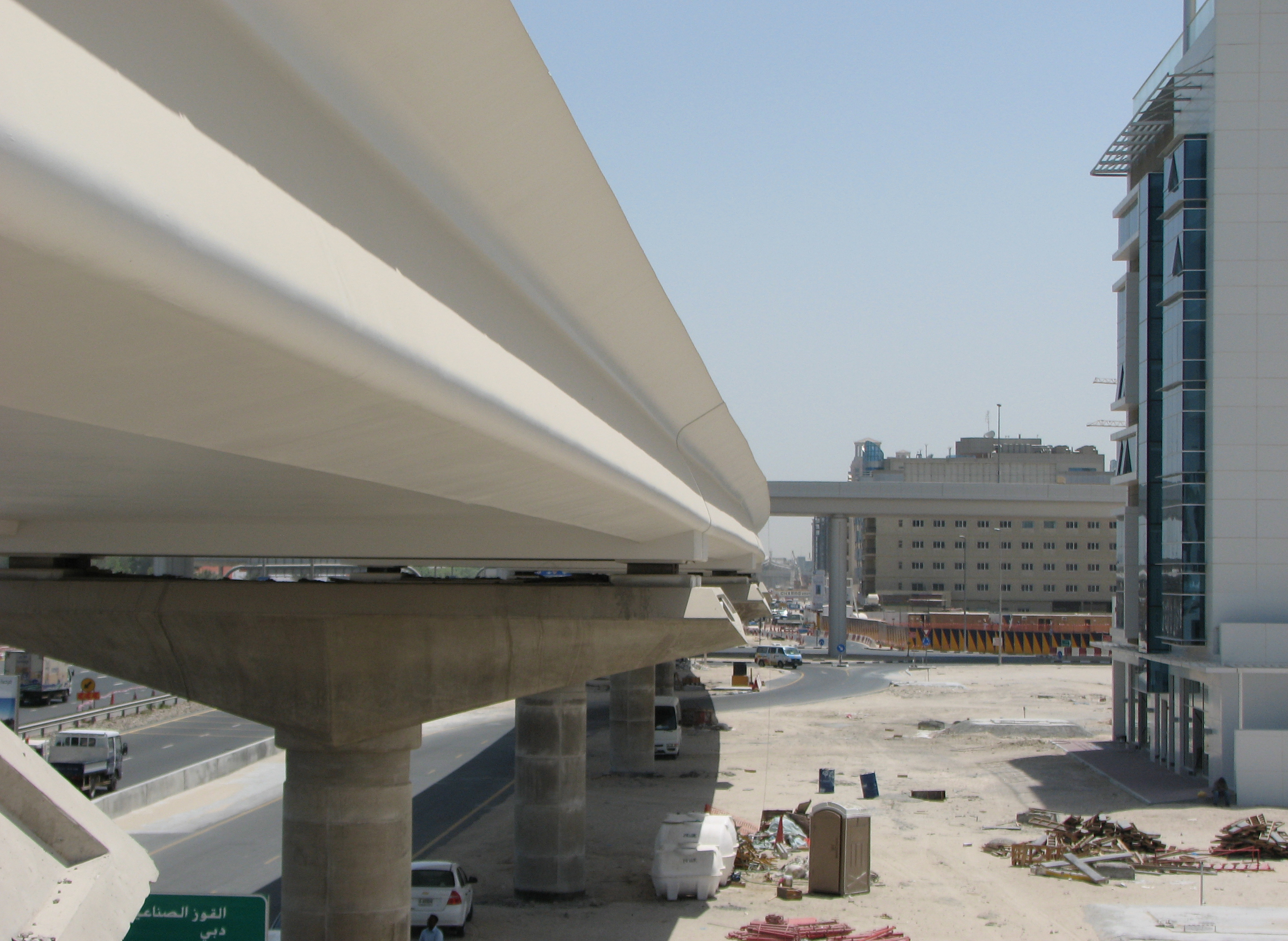
U-shaped Viaduct – Dubai

=== Tram ===
SYSTRA was involved in the design of over 60% of working tram lines in France. In 1997, SYSTRA partnered with the engineering group TYSIA to design Bordeaux's tram, which was the first tramway to dispense with overhead lines. Brest's and Casablanca's tram lines, which SYSTRA designed were named second best in the world by the British Light Rail Transit Association in 2012. SYSTRA is also responsible for the project management of the Dubai tram, opened in 2014. The group had been active in the capital since 2003 when it was charged with conducting preliminary studies for the underground. In 2018, SYSTRA Canada was asked to engineer Quebec City's tram.

=== Metro ===
SYSTRA was involved in one in two underground projects across the world, whether as a designer or an engineer, to conduct studies or to assist the project management. The company has contributed to the following notable projects :

- Santiago Metro
- Dubaï Metro : SYSTRA conducted the preliminary studies from the outset of the project in 2003 and later designed the entire system.
- Mexico City Metro : SYSTRA was mandated as a technical assistant for the construction of the B line, that completes the existing network in Mexico.
- Mecca Metro : SYSTRA designed this line, designed to ease pilgrims transport.
- Baku Metro : SYSTRA engineered the project and directed the studies from 2009 to 2014.
- Cairo Metro : since 1970, SYSTRA has signed 20 contracts with the National Tunnel Authority, including preliminary studies, conception, work supervision, and maintenance of three of the metro lines.
- Algiers Metro : SYSTRA managed the construction work and put into service the Integral System (IS).
- Grand Paris Express : SYSTRA has been involved in the preliminary studies of the new metro since 2011, and later joined in other structuring projects :
  - Assisting system project management, wheeled equipment management and automated driving for lines 15, 16 and 17.
  - Project management on Vitry-sur-Seine maintenance site.
  - Infrastructure project management on the first section of the line 15 South, between Noisy-Champs and Villejuif Louis Aragon and infrastructure project management on line 15 West together with SETEC.
- New York City Subway : SYSTRA acted as a project manager for the East Side Access, a tunnel built under the East River. They handled the budget, planning, design and construction monitoring.
- Lyon Metro SYSTRA has been working on Lyon Metro for about a dozen years, most recently undertaking the modernization and automatization of lines B and D.
- Toulouse Metro : SYSTRA conducted the preliminary studies of the A and B lines, and is engineering the central section of the C line.
- Brussels Metro : SYSTRA is in charge of the automatization of the two main lines of the network (lines 1 and 5)
- Copenhagen Metro : SYSTRA handled civil engineering work and project management for the Cityringen metro line.
- Crossrail project : SYSTRA has been chosen as a partner to manage the underground section under central London.
- Nagpur Metro : SYSTRA worked as a consultant and engineer on the creation of the first two metro lines of the city.
- Mumbai Metro : SYSTRA was appointed as a consultant on the lines 1 and 4 of Mumbai metro.
- Chennai Metro : SYSTRA was appointed as a consultant for the Phase 1 and 2 of Chennai metro.
- Surat Metro : Systra secures India's Surat Metro Rail Project Phase I contract.
- Hyderabad Airport Metro Express : SYSTRA-led consortium was selected as Engineering consultant for Hyderabad Airport Metro project, based on the recommendations of a technical committee.

=== Rail ===
- Denmark Electrification program: this program covers a network spanning 10.000 km and was implemented in 2017. SYSTRA has fulfilled consulting assignments for Banedanmark, which manages the network.
- North South freight and passengers line (Saudi Arabia): SYSTRA fulfills consulting assignments for the study, the management and the supervision of construction work. The line is over 1.400 km long, its freight axis was put in service in 2017 and its passenger line in 2018.
- Brest-Quimper line: the project manager entrusted SYSTRA with the revamping works and the line re-opened towards the end of 2017, increasing its offer by 50%.
- Belfort-Delle line: SYSTRA has been conducting the preliminary studies and supervised the work which began in 2011. Closed since 1992, the line was re-opened towards the end of 2018 and is now one of the main Franco-Swiss links.
- Trans-Gabon freight line: SYSTRA conducted the preliminary studies and designs this 650 km long line.
- Dakar Regional Express Train: the size of this project, the speed at which it was completed and the technical and socio-economic stakes make it most unusual. SYSTRA assisted the project management from 2015 until the inauguration at the beginning of 2019.
- In Southern California, SYSTRA was selected to rebuild 121 double deck coaches used by Metrolink (commuter operator in Southern California.

=== High-speed lines ===
- HSL South Europe Atlantic : SYSTRA is the engineer of choice of the COSEA group. SYSTRA owns 30% of the maintenance company MESEA, together with VINCI until 2054.
- 2nd phase of the Eastern European HSL : SYSTRA conducts consulting assignments for the study, the project management and the supervision of the work. During the dynamic trial tests for the legal ratification of the line on 14 November 2015, the test train derails. The company, the SNCF and three physical persons are placed under formal investigation on 19 December 2017. The judicial procedure is ongoing.
- Since 2018, SYSTRA has been helping the SNCF to implement the new Provence-Côte d'Azur line (LNPCA) in France.
- High Speed 1 (UK), Channel Tunnel : SYSTRA conducted consulting works for the study, project management, works supervision and opening of the tunnel.
- Seoul-Busan High Speed Rail (Korea) : SYSTRA conducted consulting works for the study, project management, work supervision and opened the line.
- In Morocco, SYSTRA participated in the first African HSL project together with the SNCF and other French companies. The line was commissioned in November 2018.
- Nîmes-Montpellier bypass : it is the first HSL dedicated to freight and passengers alike in France. SYSTRA designed and constructed the line and managed the project and the trial tests. The freight services started towards the end of 2017 and the passenger services in mid-2018.

=== Urban cable cars ===
SYSTRA is involved in defining, designing and integrating cable transport projects in urban settings. The company has for instance been chosen to design, implement and maintain the Orleans cable car, and in 2018 won the contract for Marseille's cable car project. SYSTRA is also designed Toulouse.'s cable car, the second urban cable car project in France after that of Brest (opened in 2016), and the second longest.

=== Bridges ===
In 2014, SYSTRA was requested to conduct studies for the Chacao bridge, meant to link the Chilean island of Chiloe to the continent. It is the biggest suspension bridge project in South America. Located near a seismic fault, the project is a technological challenge. The construction was approved in February 2019.

On 1 May 2019, SYSTRA inaugurated the Sheikh Jaber Al-Ahmad Al-Saba bridge in Kuwait.

During 2017, SYSTRA acquired International Bridge Technologies, a prominent bridge engineering company. On that occasion, the group announced that it was launching a worldwide expert network on the subject.

In 2018, SYSTRA was selected by the city of Kingston, Canada to design and build a 1.2 km bridge over the Cataraqui river. The Waaban Crossing opened in 2022.

=== Underground structures ===
SYSTRA is in charge of a section of the Lyon-Turin Euralpin Tunnel (TELT), one of the biggest railway projects in Europe.

On 5 October 2021, SYSTRA acquired SWS, an Italian engineering company in the field of tunnels and underground structures, making it SYSTRA SWS.

== Innovation ==
=== Ville10D ===
SYSTRA has been a partner of the French national research program Ville10D since 2012. The program consistently promotes the exploitation of urban underground spaces via the design of sustainable metropolises. With about 30 partners (engineers, project managers, research labs, companies and NGOs), the program hopes to improve knowledge of underground resources and to show there is a realistic alternative to laying out the surface only. This initiative of the French Association for Tunnels and Underground Space (AFTES) is supported by the French Minister for Ecological Transition.

=== Autonomous train ===
SYSTRA's teams also work towards developing autonomous trains together with the SNCF. The aim is to create a system that perceives its surroundings in a way that imitates the observation powers of train drivers. Since 2015, the group has worked with several partners on European wide research and innovation projects, including IN2RAIL, SHIFT2RAIL and CAPACITY4RAIL. These projects intend to optimize the conception of key elements in the infrastructure (tracks, tracks appliances), to develop predictive maintenance and to envisage future rail management systems.

=== Hyperloop ===
Since 2016, the firm has been part of the consultative technological committee of Virgin Hyperloop One, a company developing the high speed transportation technology "Hyperloop". In January 2017, the Californian company asked SYSTRA to assess the safety of the Hyperloop infrastructures in order to obtain the legal validation of the project. The first two tests are successfully conducted that very same year. The group is awarded the BIM prize for "Build Earth Live Hyperloop", in Dubai during the "Hyperloop Station Design Competition", for its Möbius project. The 2-day challenge consisted in using a collaborative BIM platform to conceive a prototype that would bring the 2h30 train ride between Dubai and the Fujairah Emirate to about 10 minutes.

=== Singapore ASV project ===
In Singapore, SYSTRA supported the ASV project (Automated Driving Simulation and Validation) in partnership with the Institute of Technological Research SystemX, the NTU (Nanyang Technological University), Renault, SNCF, and AV Simulation (an OKTAL subsidiary). The project was one of the strategic lines of the CETRAN (Center of Excellence for Testing and Research of Autonomous Vehicles), centered on the development of a digital simulation platform to test out and certify the safety of autonomous vehicles in urban and suburban environments. For 48 months, autonomous vehicles had been tried and tested on a 2ha trial ground that resembled Singapore's main roads.

=== La Fabrique ===
In 2012, SYSTRA creates the workshop " La Fabrique " that uses a "makerstorming" fast-track method of innovation invented by the Nod-A agency. The workshop brings together employees and outside speakers in a cross-disciplinary approach in order to reflect upon practical problems and come up with answers. In 2016, " La Fabrique " was awarded the Label 2017 of the L'Observeur du Design.

== Results and economic context ==
In the Engineering News-Record (ENR) 2023 Rankings (based on 2022 turnover), SYSTRA was ranked 3rd in "Mass Transit and Rail", 4th in "Bridges", and 8th in "Transportation". ENR also ranked SYSTRA 24th among the top 225 international design firms and 45th among the top 150 global design firms.

The group relies on the historical expertise of the SNCF and RATP.

SYSTRA is present on every continent, in 80 countries in total. The company divides its activity between seven regions, relying on its local subsidiaries. In 2017, SYSTRA was involved in 60% of the world's automated metro line projects. International revenue grew throughout the 2010s, from 55% in 2015 to two-thirds in 2018.

SYSTRA employs about 10,900 employees worldwide.

== Awards ==
- Structural Awards 2008 presented to the St. Pancras International Station High Speed 1 project. The prize awarded to the RLE consortium (Arup, Bechtel, Halcrow, SYSTRA) for the structural design of the buildings.
- Grand Prix National for engineering, awarded in 2008 by SYNTEC Ingénierie to Daniel DUTOIT (SYSTRA) for overall design and project management of the Dubai metro.
- Safety Award 2010 (RTA – Roads and Transport Authority, Dubai): Prize awarded to SYSTRA – PARSONS for maintaining high standards of health, safety and environment.
- MEED transport project of the year (2011) awarded to SYSTRA & Parsons for the Dubai metro red line
- Centenary award awarded in 2013 by FIDIC for the Makkah – Mashaaer metro.
