= Al Mashaaer Al Mugaddassah Metro line =

Metro line in the city of Mecca, Saudi Arabia

Al Mashaaer Al Mugaddassah Metro line S
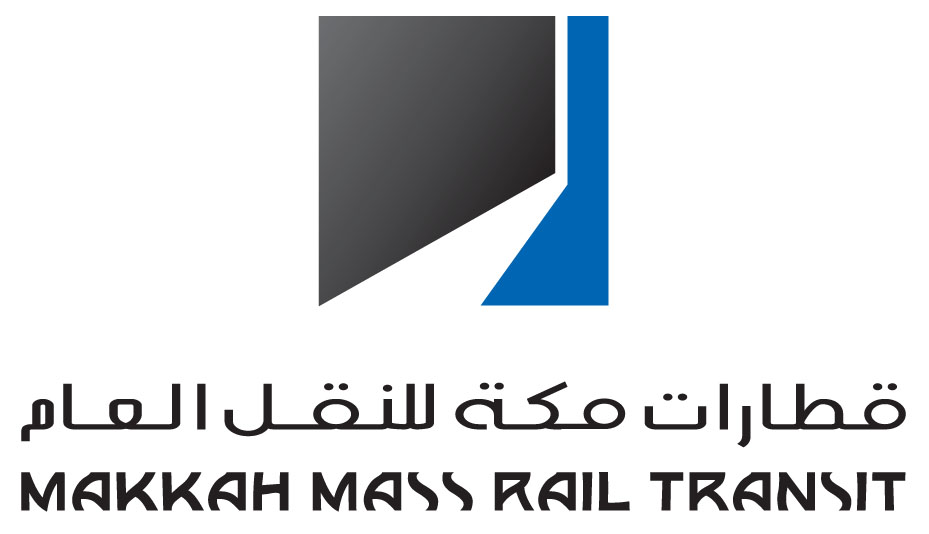

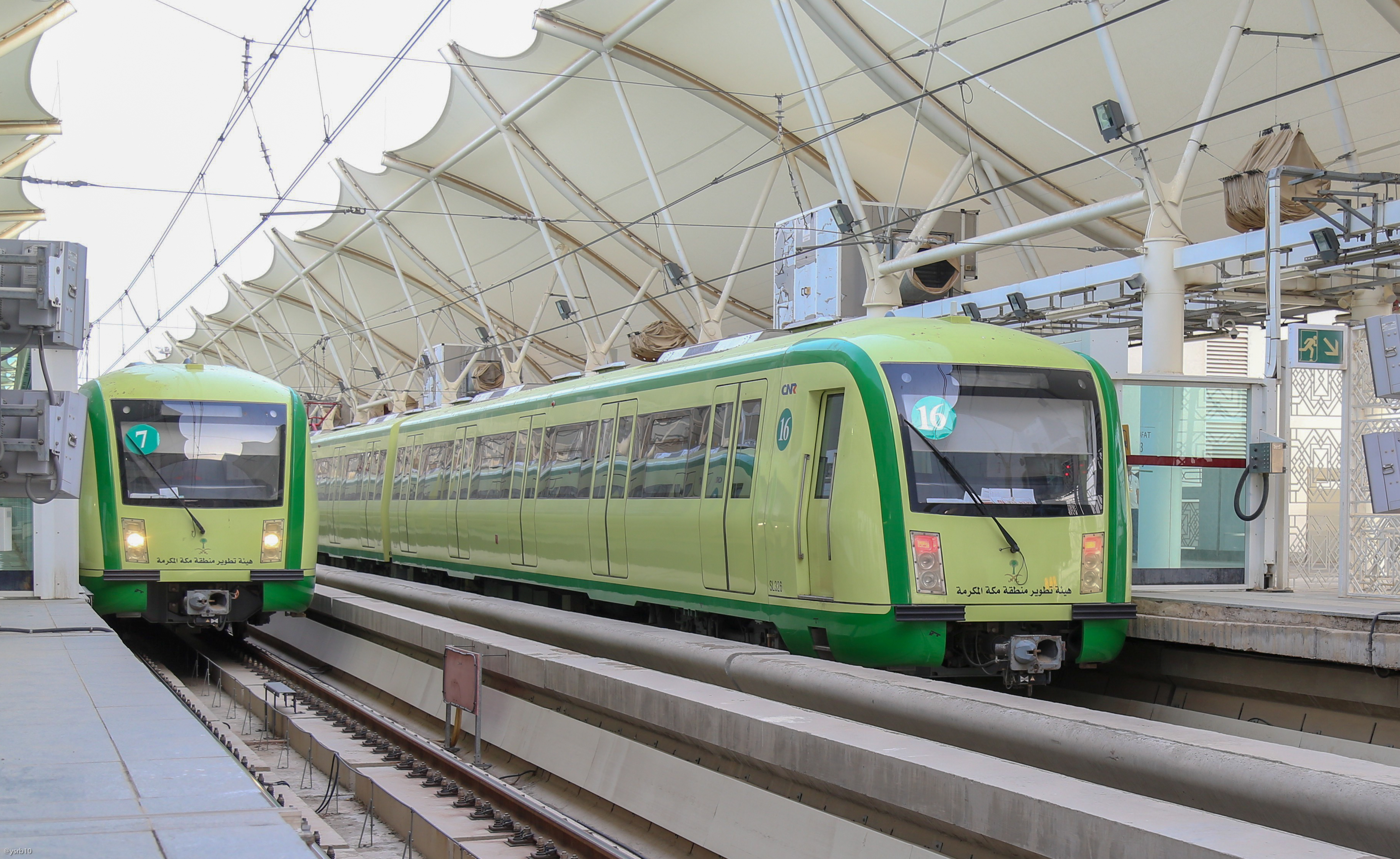

Overview
- Native name: قطار المشاعر المقدسة الخط الجنوبي
- Owner: Makkah Mass Rail Transit Company
- Locale: Eastern Mecca, Saudi Arabia
- Transit type: Rapid transit
- Number of lines: 1
- Number of stations: 9

Operation
- Began operation: 13 November 2010
- Operator: China Railway Construction Corporation Limited
- Character: Elevated
- Rolling stock: CRRC Changchun Type 12A EMUs
- Number of vehicles: 204 carriages, 17 twelve-car sets
- Train length: 276.8 metres (908 ft 2 in)
- Headway: 150 seconds peak

Technical
- System length: 18.1 km (11.2 mi)
- Track gauge: 1,435 mm (4 ft 8 1/2 in) standard gauge
- Electrification: 1,500 V DC; Overhead catenary
System map
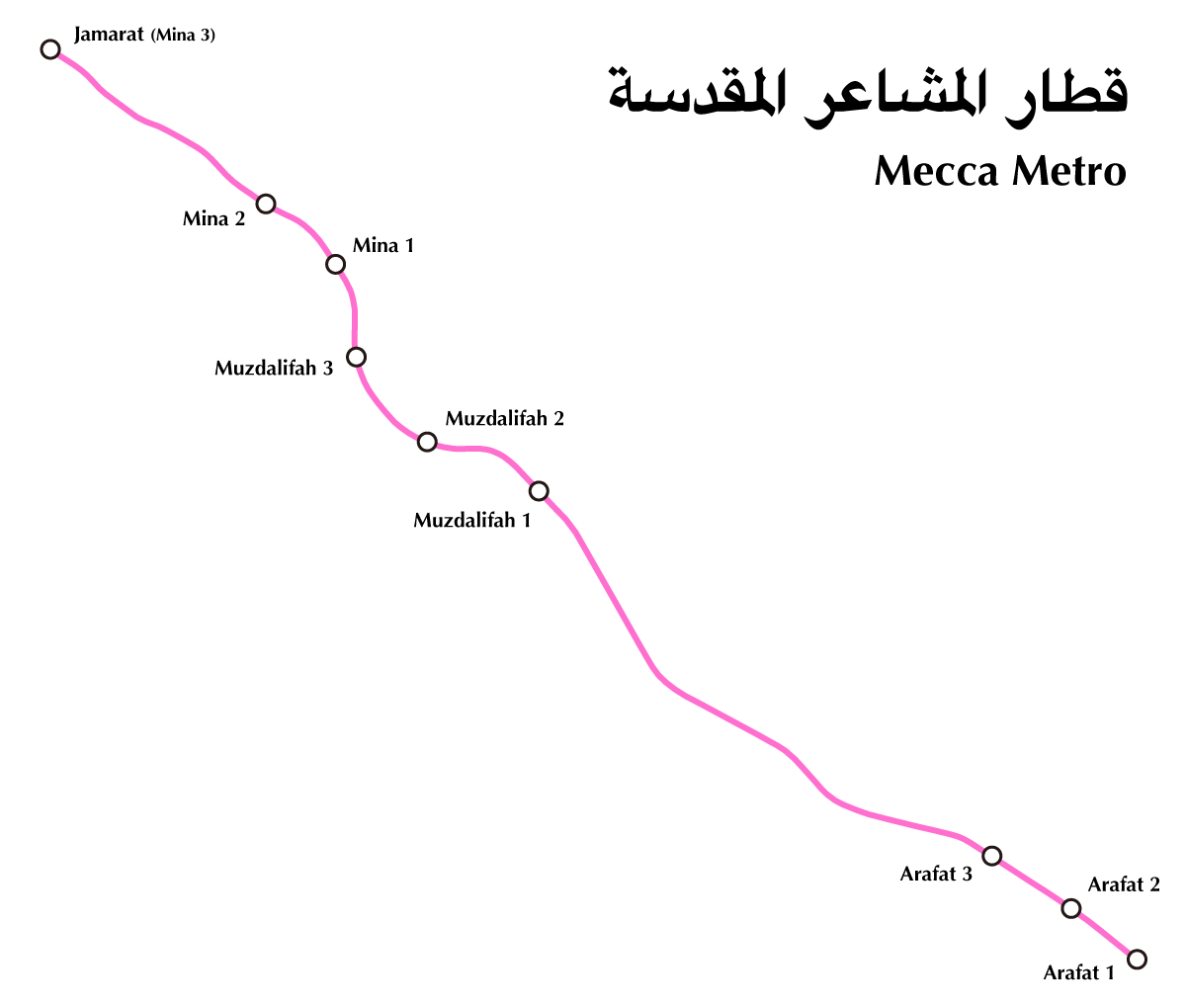

The Al Mashaaer Al Mugaddassah Metro Line (Note: (Arabic: قطار المشاعر المقدسة, romanized: Qiṭār Al-mašāʕir Al-muqaddasa standard pronunciation: [qitˤaːr almaʃaːʕir almuqaddasa], Hejazi Arabic pronunciation: [gɪtˤaːr almaʃaːʕɪr almʊgaddasa])) or The Sacred Sites Metro Line is a metro line in the city of Mecca, Saudi Arabia used exclusively as a shuttle train for pilgrims between holy sites in Mecca, Mount Arafat, Muzdalifah and Mina to reduce congestion caused by thousands of buses and cars during the Hajj. It is the second metro system on the Arabian Peninsula, after the Dubai Metro.

The line opened on 13 November 2010, in time for the Hajj 1431 between 25 and 29 November 2010. It was built separately from, and will not be physically linked to, the future Mecca Metro network.

== Services ==
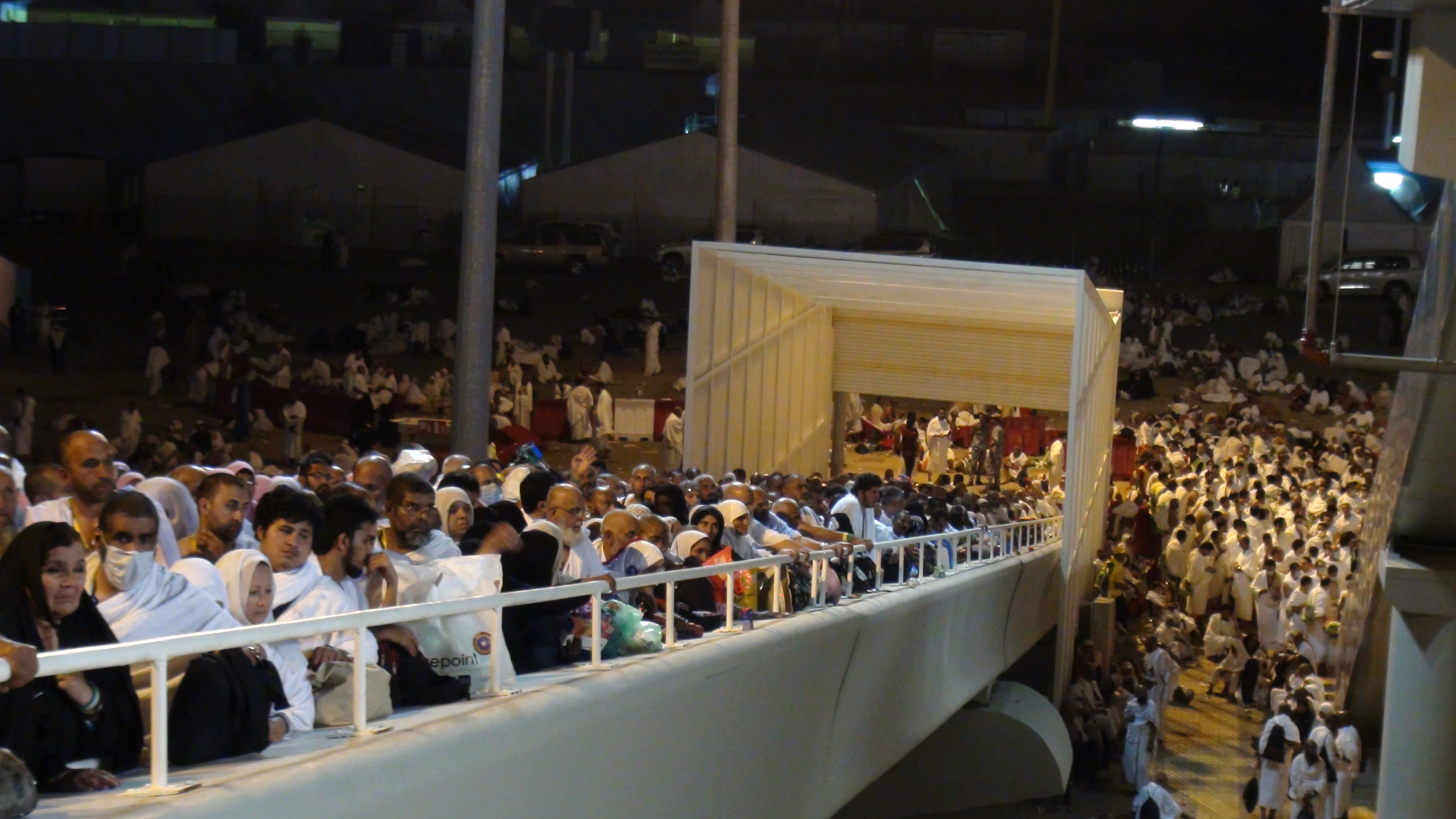
Congestion at Al Mashaaer Al Mugaddassah Metro station Arafat area, November 2012

Before completion, Saudi officials estimated the line would replace 53,000 buses, promising a safer, more comfortable pilgrimage. By the time of the 2011 Hajj (Hajj 1432) it was able to operate at 100% capacity and is estimated to have carried more than 3.95 million passengers making it, for that period, the most intensively used metro line in the world and among the busiest systems in the world. Each 12-car train carries 3,000 passengers and the headway is 150 seconds (24 trains per hour). (Note: The CRCC website says the trains have a capacity of 3,000 passengers (250 cars × 12 car trains) (http://meccametro.com/about-abu-dhabi-metro) but the analysis of the 2011 Hajj cites a figure of 3,600 passengers per train (12 × 300) and 30 trains per hour (120 second headway) (http://www.terrapinn.com/exhibition/middle-east-rail/Data/dr-salim-albostapart3.pdf). It is designed to transport 72,000 passengers per hour per direction (pphpd).)

In peak periods the line operates with a special "group shuttle" schedule, used for train movements "B", "C", "D", with three departure stations and three arrival stations. At each holy site on the line there are three stations. It allows filling up 3 trains simultaneously on the same line at 3 stations, and moving them together. Return is on same track, and 2nd track used separately to double the capacity, unlike typical 2way metro track use. To further increase volume, after filling 1set of 3 trains, 2nd set is also filled, before moving 6 trains together on each track. Thereby, 12 trains of passengers complete the journey in 30min.

At off-peak times stopping-all-stations service is run, with various movements "A", and "E". Tickets are 250 riyals, except the last day when they are 100 riyals.

== Operation contracts ==
In March 2010, Serco Middle East was awarded a contract by China Railway Construction Corporation Limited (CRCC) to advise on the operation and maintenance of the Makkah Metro. CRCC had been awarded the design, build, operate and maintain contract in 2008 by the Ministry of Municipal and Rural Affairs.

In November 2014, Metro project promoter Makkah Mass Rail Transit Co has selected Kuala Lumpur transport agency Prasarana to provide consultancy services during Phase 1 of the Makkah Public Transport Programme. Phase 1 covers the construction of two metro lines totalling 45.1 km and 22 stations, with commissioning scheduled by 2019.

During the 2014 Hajj, staff from Prasarana Malaysia and Express Rail Link helped to fulfill CRCC's staffing requirement to support operations.

Beginning in 2018, the contract was once again held by China Railway Construction Corporation Limited after three years of operation by Prasarana.

== Train movements ==
Movement	Start DateTime	End DateTime	Service patterns	Arafat; 1	Arafat; 2	Arafat; 3	Muzdalifah; 1	Muzdalifah; 2	Muzdalifah; 3	Mina; 1	Mina; 2	Mina; 3 (Jamarat)
A	7 Dhu al-Hijjah 04:00	8 Dhu al-Hijjah 19:00	Arafat <> Mina	●	●	●	●	●	●	●	●	●
B	8 Dhu al-Hijjah 20:00	9 Dhu al-Hijjah 10:00	Mina > Arafat Group Shuttle	●	●	●				●	●	●
C	9 Dhu al-Hijjah Sunset	9 Dhu al-Hijjah 22:00	Arafat > Muzdalifah Group Shuttle	●	●	●	●	●	●			
D	9 Dhu al-Hijjah 23:30	10 Dhu al-Hijjah 08:30	Muzdalifah > Mina; Group Shuttle				Departure A	Departure B	Departure C	Arrival A	Arrival B	Arrival C
E	10; Dhu al-Hijjah 09:00	13 Dhu al-Hijjah 18:00	Mina > Muzdalifah > Arafat > Mina (Except daily 02:00-04:00 Trains stop for maintenance)			Stop 3			Stop 2	Departure	Stop 1	Arrival

== Construction history ==
The line was claimed to be the world's fastest design in the world, at 22 months, 16 months if religious habit is taken into consideration. It was initially operated at 35% capacity with automatic train protection to assist manual driving.

China Railway Construction Corporation Limited was responsible for infrastructure construction and systems integration under the 6.7-billion-riyal phase I contract which was awarded by the Saudi Arabian government in February 2009 following a visit by President Hu Jintao of China.

CRCC carried out construction of the project infrastructure and integrated and subcontracted various systems. The line was built in only 21 months by about 8,000 skilled and unskilled workers and approximately 5,000 engineers.

DBI (Deutsche Bahn International GmbH), a fully owned subsidiary of Deutsche Bahn AG and DAR Dar Al Handasah, were awarded with a contract from the Ministry of Municipalities and Rural Affairs of the Kingdom of Saudi Arabia to become the supervising engineers, responsible for design, construction, railway systems implementation and railway operations.

Several subcontracts were awarded. Al-Muruj Electromechanical Co. was awarded MEP works at all 9 stations. Siemens provided the overhead line catenary system supplied at 1500 V DC. Westinghouse Platform Screen Doors supplied the platforms with screen doors, Siemens power supplies, and WS Atkins is responsible for electrical and mechanical systems and project management. Thales supplied SelTrac Communications-Based Train Control, an operations control centre, CCTV, SCADA and passenger information systems. Systra supervised the civil work. Serco provides operations and maintenance consultancy. TÜV Rheinland were the Independent Competent Person (ICP) on the project and provided safety, operations, training, fire and systems assurance consultancy support including the development of System-Wide, O&M Safety Case and HSQE Management Systems. TÜV Rheinland also secured the Operating Licence and Safety Certificate for acceptance by the Saudi Railway Commission (SRC) in 2011, 2012 and 2013. Air conditioning solution was provided by SKM Air Conditioning Equipment Sharjah, UAE.

The line is elevated at a height varying between 8 metres (26 ft) and 10 metres (33 ft).

Although the current metro uses conventional steel wheel on rail technology, it is sometimes incorrectly referred to as a 'monorail' due to the cancellation of a planned project in 2009.

=== CRCC losses on contract ===
In November 2010 CRCC claimed they had lost 4.15 billion yuan (~US$600 million) on the US$1.77 billion contract due to changes insisted on by the client. The earthworks alone reportedly increased two-and-a-half times from 2 million cubic metres to 5 million. CRCC was seeking, with Chinese government support, extra compensation from the Saudi Arabian government to help cover the losses.

== Rolling stock ==
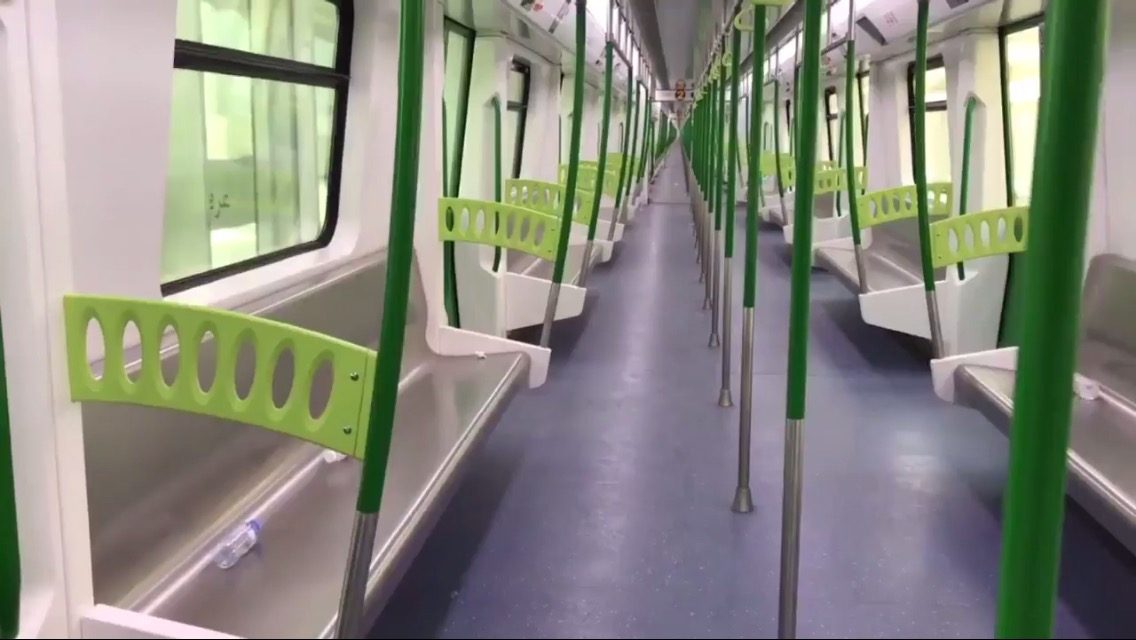
The interior of CRRC Changchun Type A rolling stock

On 4 April 2009, CNR Changchun (now CRRC Changchun Railway Vehicles) was awarded a contract to supply 17 Type A 12-car metro trainsets. Each set has eight motor and four trailer cars, all with aluminium bodies. A Type A car is 22.3 metres long and 3 metres wide. Knorr-Bremse supplied the braking systems with modifications to suit sandy conditions. It also features 5 train doors per side.

The first trainset was shipped from China in May 2010 and the last arrived by the end of 2010.

== See also ==
- Saudi Railways Organization (SRO)
- Saudi Railway Company (SAR)
- Transport in Saudi Arabia
- Riyadh Metro
