= Haramain High Speed Railway =

High-speed rail line in Saudi Arabia

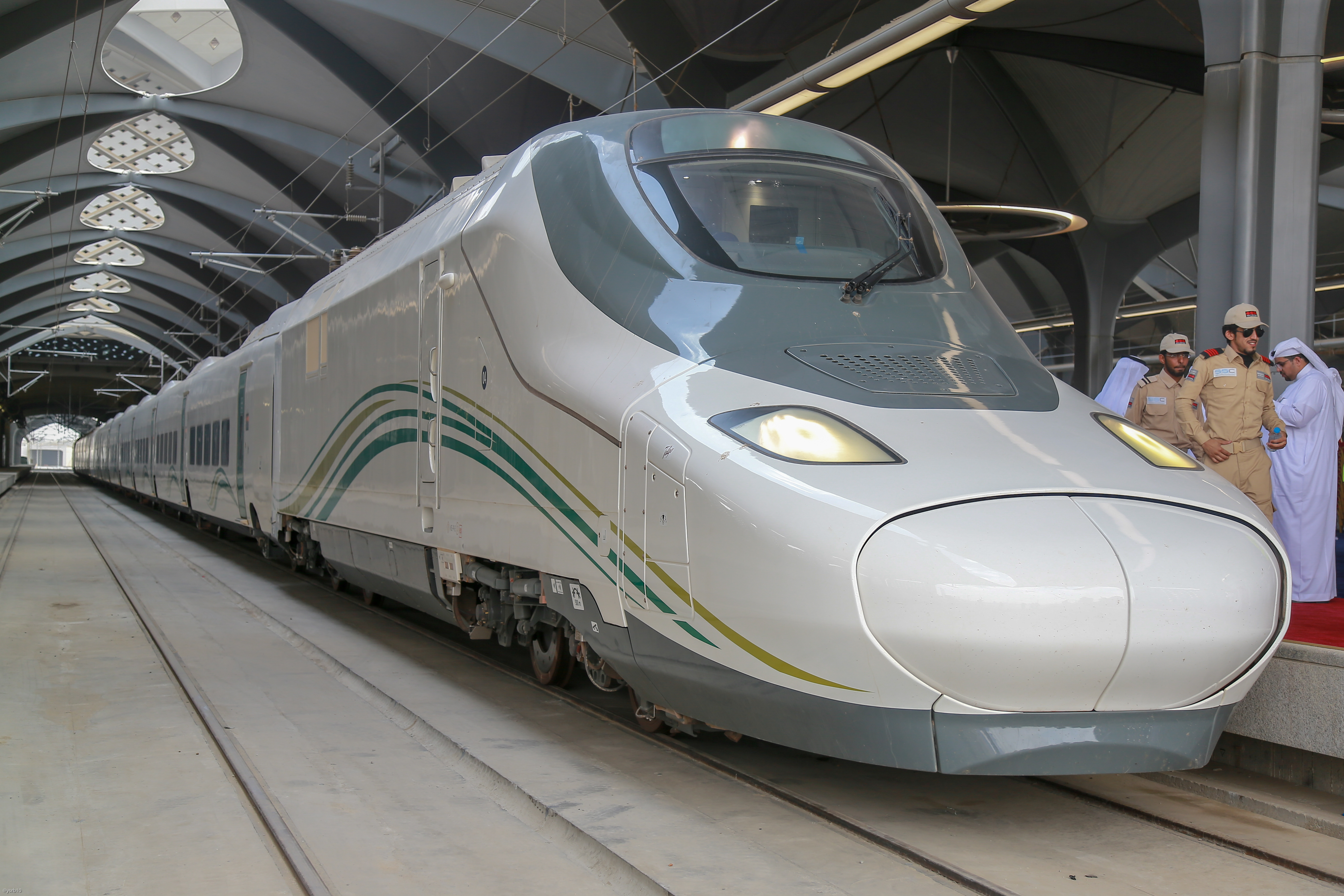

Overview
- Native name: قطار الحرمين السريع
- Status: Operational
- Termini: Medina; Mecca
- Stations: 5
- Website: sar.hhr.sa

Service
- Type: Intercity, high-speed railway
- Operator(s): Saudi Arabia Railways
- Rolling stock: Talgo 350 SRO
- Ridership: 6.97 Million (2023)

History
- Opened: 11 October 2018; 7 years ago

Technical
- Line length: 453.0 kilometres (281.5 mi)
- Number of tracks: 2
- Track gauge: 1,435 mm (4 ft 8 1/2 in) standard gauge
- Electrification: 25 kV AC, 60 Hz overhead catenary
- Operating speed: 300 km/h (186 mph)
Route map
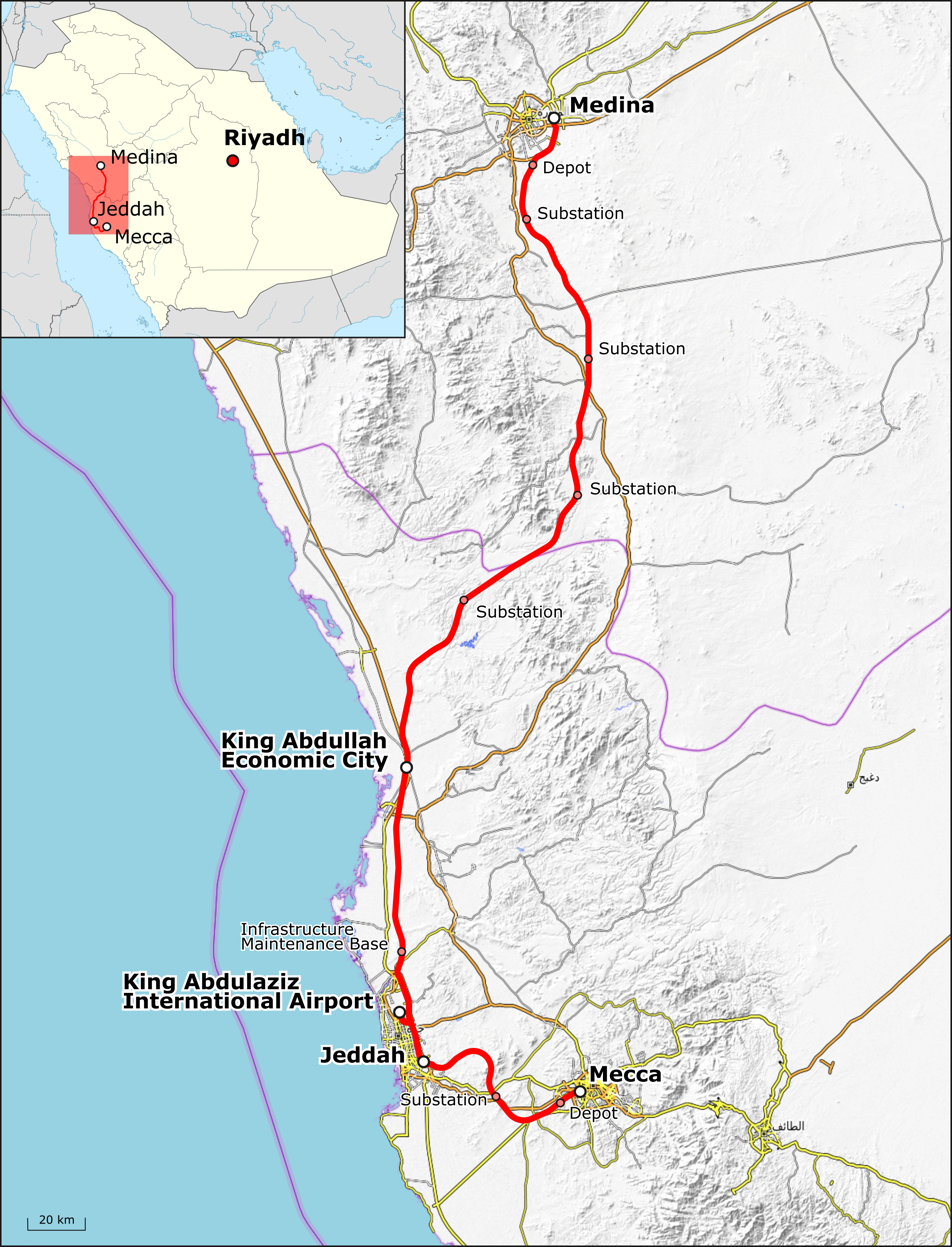

The Haramain High Speed Railway (Arabic: قطار الحرمين السريع, romanized: qiṭār al-ḥaramayn as-sarīʿ, Hejazi Arabic pronunciation: [ɡɪtˤaːr alħarameːn asːariːʕ], abbreviated HHR), is a passenger railway serving the Mecca and Medina provinces in western Saudi Arabia. The 449.2-kilometre-long (279.1 mi) main line directly connects the Islamic holy cities of Mecca and Medina (collectively known as the Haramain), via Jeddah and the King Abdullah Economic City. A 3.75-kilometre (2.33 mi) branch line provides connections to the King Abdulaziz International Airport in Jeddah. It opened to the public on 11 October 2018.

The HHR has a service speed of 300 km/h (186 mph), making it the first high-speed railway in Saudi Arabia, the Middle East and West Asia. Construction began in March 2009 and the railway was officially inaugurated on 25 September 2018, opening to the public on 11 October 2018.

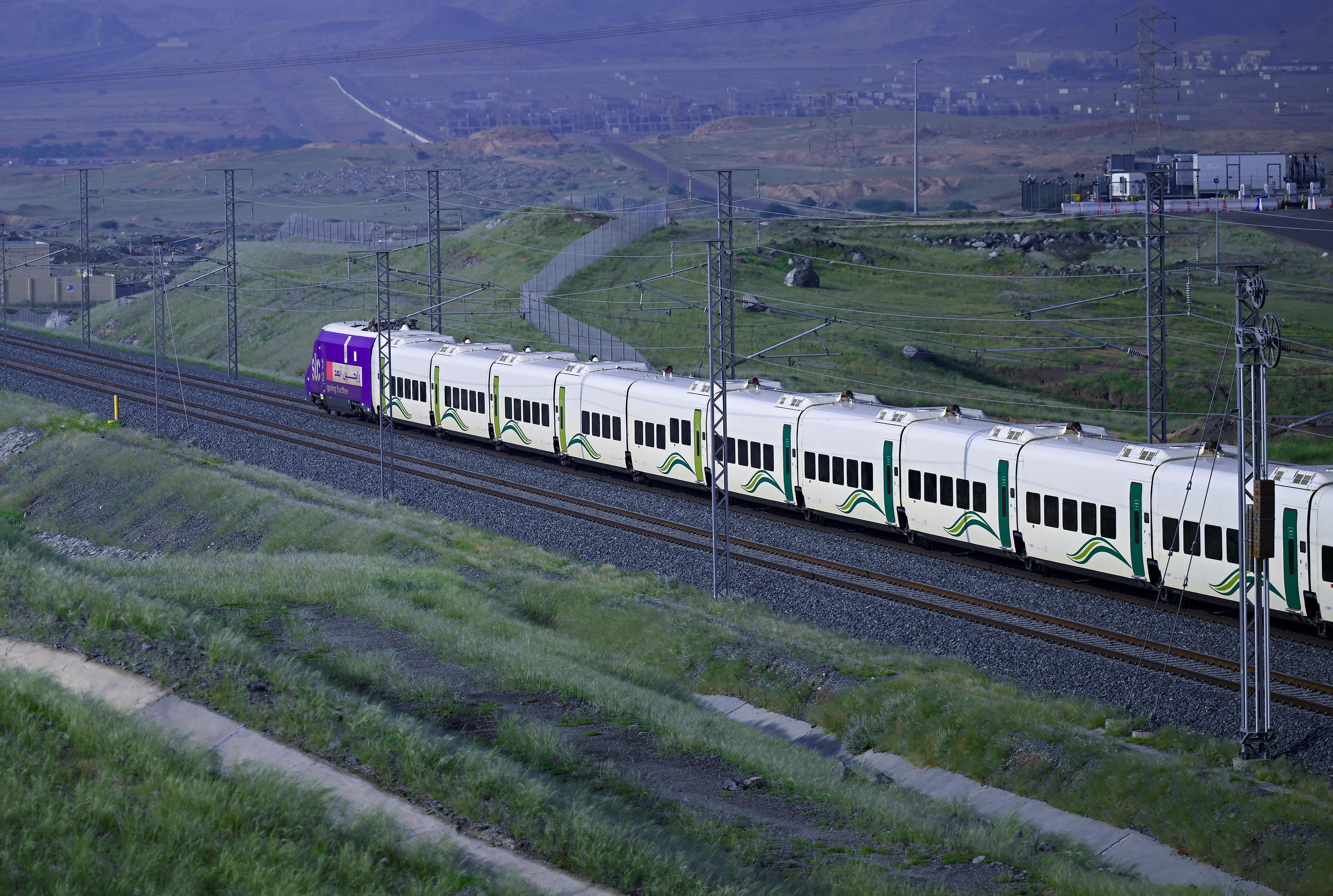

== History ==
=== Construction ===
Construction began in March 2009, and the project was originally slated for completion in 2012. Having opened in 2018, the HHR took six years longer to complete than anticipated. The total contract value was approximately US$9.4 billion.

=== 2019 Al-Sulimaniyah–Jeddah Station fire ===
On 29 September 2019, less than a year after the opening of the line, a massive fire broke out at the Al Sulimaniyah–Jeddah Station in southern Jeddah, injuring several people and resulting in the station being completely destroyed. Firefighters took 12 hours to bring the fire under control, and the fire was traced back to the fibre-reinforced plastic roof panels, although the reason behind the panels catching fire still remains unknown. A 1.5-kilometre (0.93 mi) bypass line was constructed around the station to avoid disruption to services between Mecca and Medina.

=== COVID-19 suspension ===
HHR services were suspended on 20 March 2020 due to the COVID-19 pandemic. Services between Mecca and Medina resumed on 31 March 2021.

== Engineering ==
=== Design ===
The Saudi Railways Organisation commissioned Dar Al-Handasah to prepare the concept design of the project. Dar Al-Handasah was also assigned to supervise the construction and manage the HHR. Their design incorporated one cut-and-cover tunnel, 46 rail bridges, 9 wadi bridges, 5 rail underpasses, 53 vehicular overpasses, 30 vehicular underpasses, 12 camel crossings, 5 stations, and 3 depots.

The double-track line is electrified and has a maximum design speed of either 320 km/h (200 mph) or 360 km/h (224 mph). However, trains are limited to a top speed of 300 km/h (186 mph) while in service. The 77-kilometre (48 mi) ride from Mecca to Al-Sulimaniyah–Jeddah takes 43 minutes at an average speed of around 107 km/h (66 mph), while the 449-kilometre (279 mi) ride between the two termini, Mecca and Medina, takes around 2 hours. The track, rolling stock, and stations are designed to withstand temperatures ranging from 0 °C (32 °F) to 50 °C (122 °F). It was expected that the HHR will transport 60 million passengers a year on 35 trains, with a seating capacity of 417 per train.

=== Construction ===
Construction was divided into two phases. The 6.79 billion riyal (US$1.81 billion) contract for Package 1 of Phase I was awarded to Al Rajhi Alliance in March 2009. The alliance consists of the Chinese China Railway Construction Corporation, the French Bouygues, and Saudi companies Al Arrab Contracting Company and Al Suwailem Company, in cooperation with the Saudi consulting company Khatib and Alami and with management support from the British Scott Wilson Group.

The Phase I second package covered the design of the Makkah, Madinah, Al-Sulimaniyah–Jeddah, and Airport–Jeddah stations, and was awarded in April 2009 to Foster+Partners and Buro Happold, at a price of US$38 million. In February 2011, the construction contracts were awarded to a joint venture between Saudi Oger and El Seif Engineering for both stations in Jeddah and the KAEC station, the Saudi Binladin Group for Makkah Station, and the Turkish Yapı Merkezi for Madinah Station.

Prequalified consortia for Phase II included the Saudi Binladin Group, Badr Consortium, Al-Shoula Group, and Al-Rajhi Alliance, in addition to the Chinese CSRG. On 26 October 2011, the Saudi Railways Organization announced that the Al‑Shoula Group, which consisted of 14 Saudi and Spanish companies including Talgo, Renfe, ADIF, COPASA, Indra Sistemas, Siemens mobility, OHL, and Al Shoula, had been chosen for the contract.

=== Rolling stock ===
As part of the contract of construction Phase II, Talgo was to supply 35 Renfe Class 102 (marketed as Talgo 350) push-pull trains at a price of 1.257 billion euros, with options for 23 more for 800 million euros. Renfe and Adif would operate the trains and maintain the line for 12 years. Ultimately, 36 Talgo 350 SRO trains were ordered, with one equipped with a dual hybrid coach pair for up to 20 or 30 VIPs. The propulsion and bogies were made at Bombardier factories in Spain.

=== Main line ===
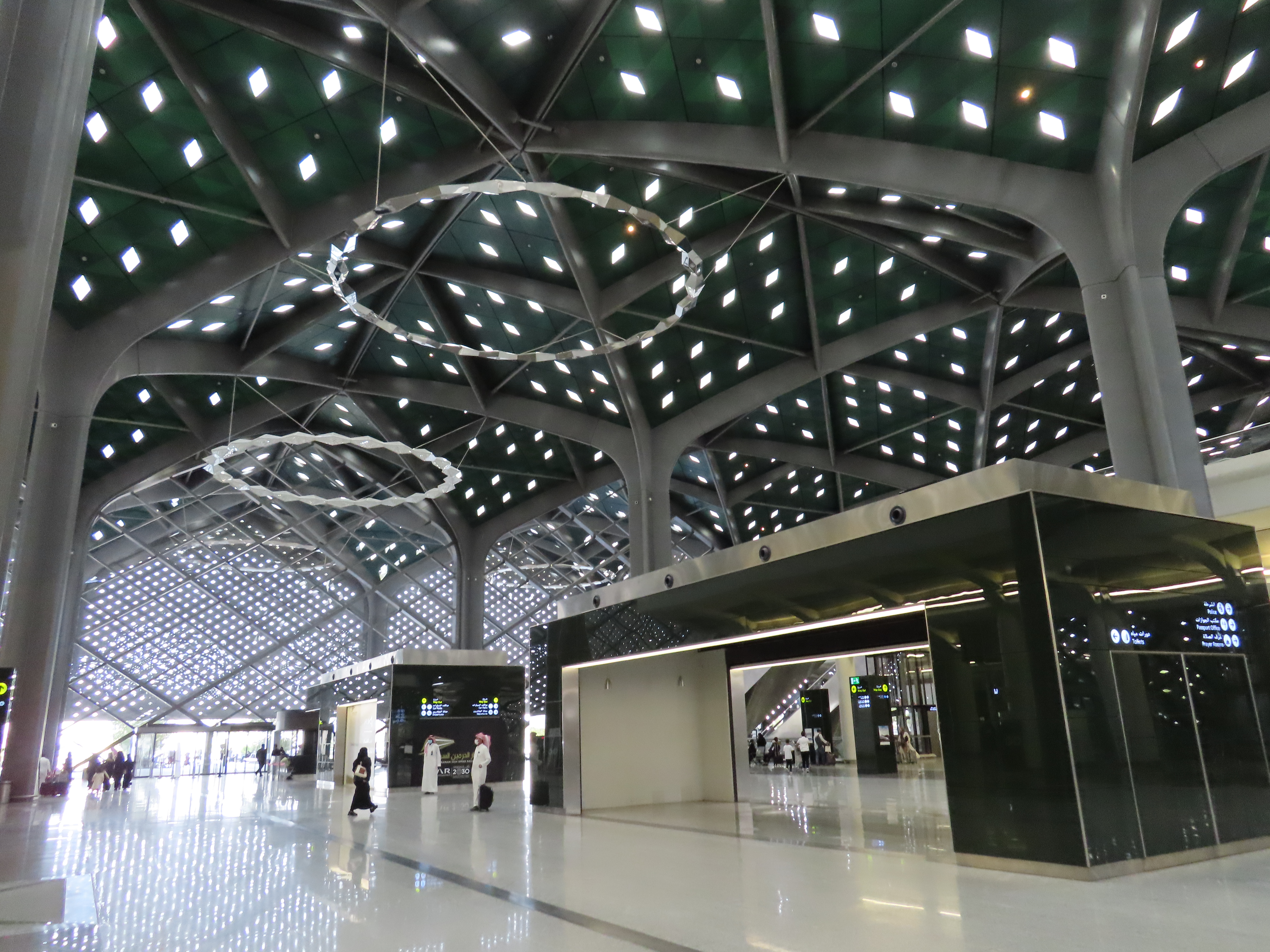
Medina Station interior

There are five stations on the line.

- Medina Station (King Abdulaziz Street-East)
- King Abdullah Economic City Station in Rabigh
- Jeddah Station (Al Sulaymaniyah) - Operating
- Mecca Station (Rusaiyfah)

=== King Abdulaziz International Airport Branch ===
- King Abdulaziz International Airport - opened 11 December 2019

The Makkah Central Station is located near the 3rd Ring Road, in Rusaiyfah District near the Rusaiyfah park and ride to the Grand Mosque. The Jeddah Central Station is located on Haramain Road, in Al-Naseem District. The railway alignment route is on the median of the Haramain road. Medina has a passenger station. A station was built at the King Abdulaziz International Airport, connected via a branch line.

According to Saudi Railways Organisation the stations are "aesthetically iconic" buildings with designs which take into account Islamic architectural traditions. They have shops, restaurants, mosques, car parking, a helipad and VIP lounges. Stations were designed by Buro Happold and Foster + Partners.

== See also ==
- Saudi Arabia Railways
- Transport in Saudi Arabia
- Hejaz Railway
