= Medina Province, Saudi Arabia =

Province of Saudi Arabia

Medina Province منطقة المدينة المنورة
- Province
- Al-Madinah Al-Munawwarah Province
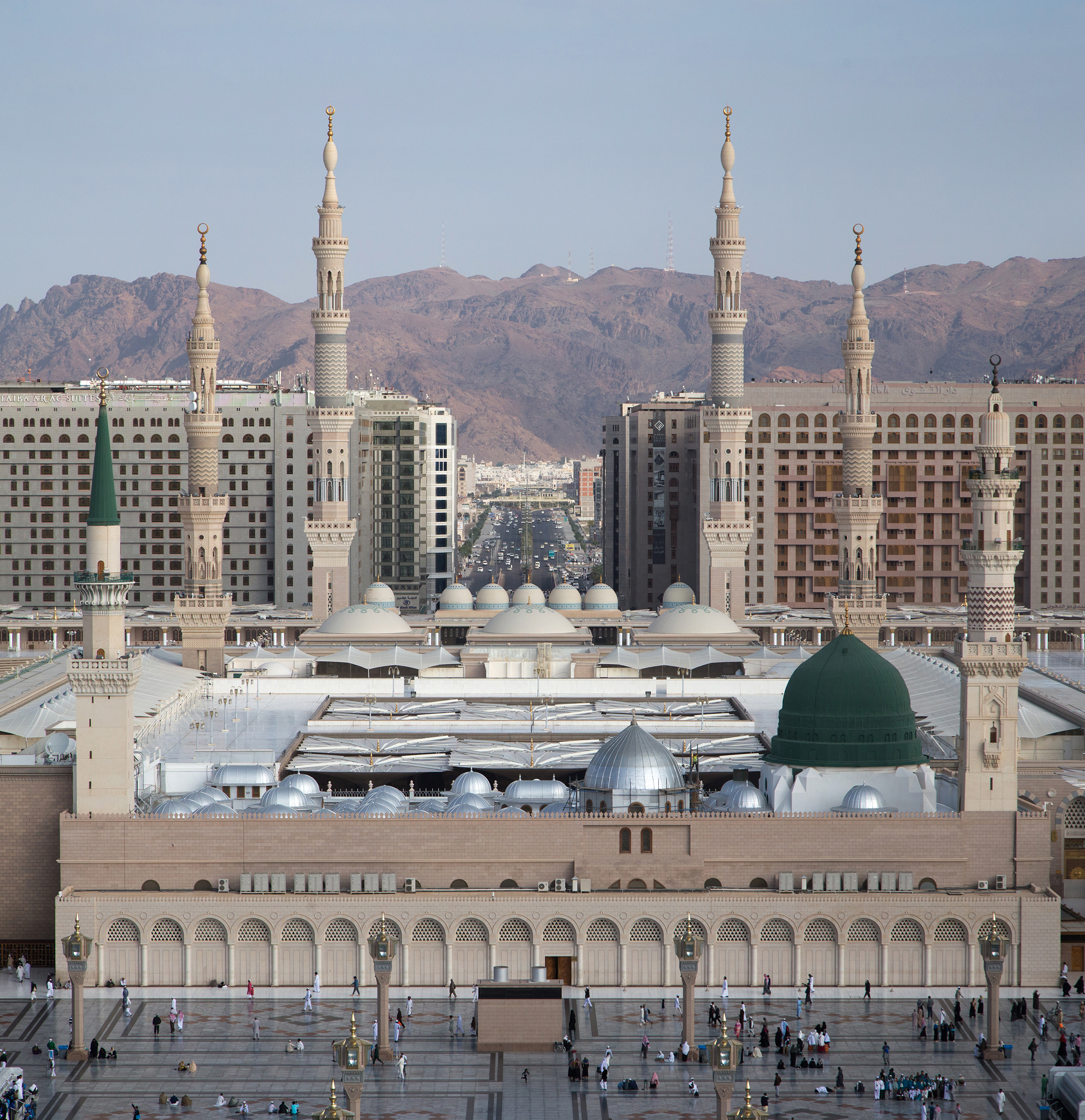
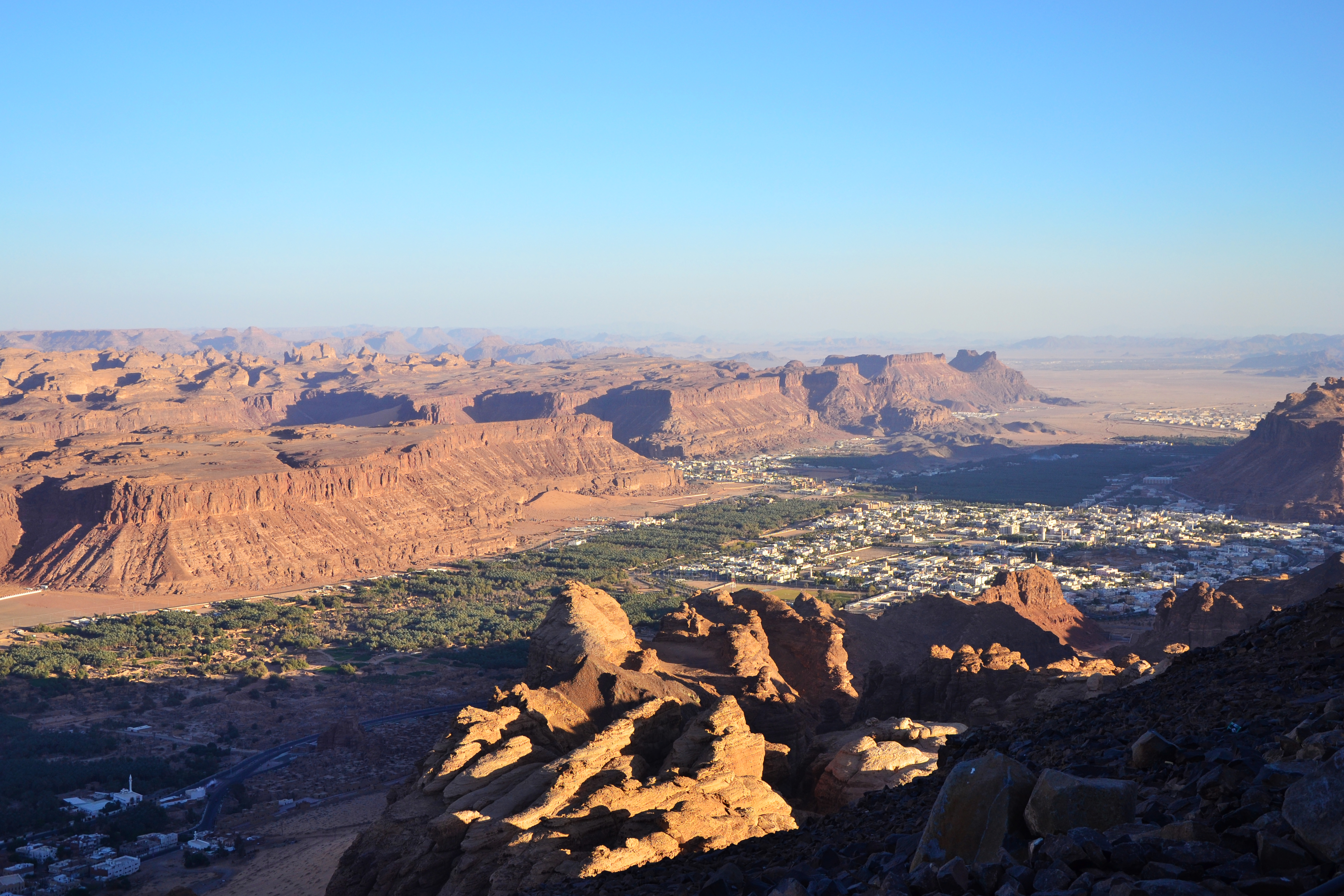
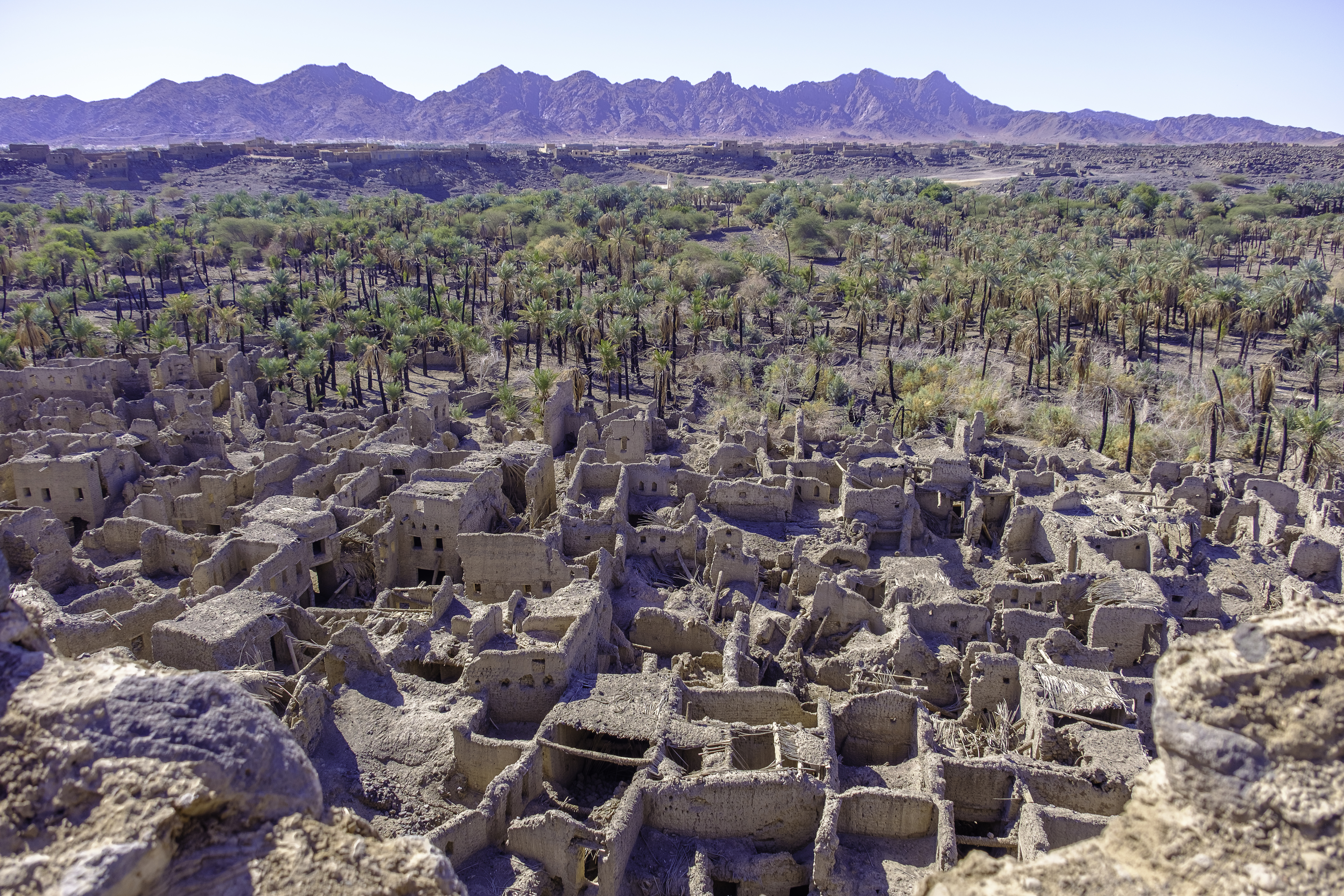
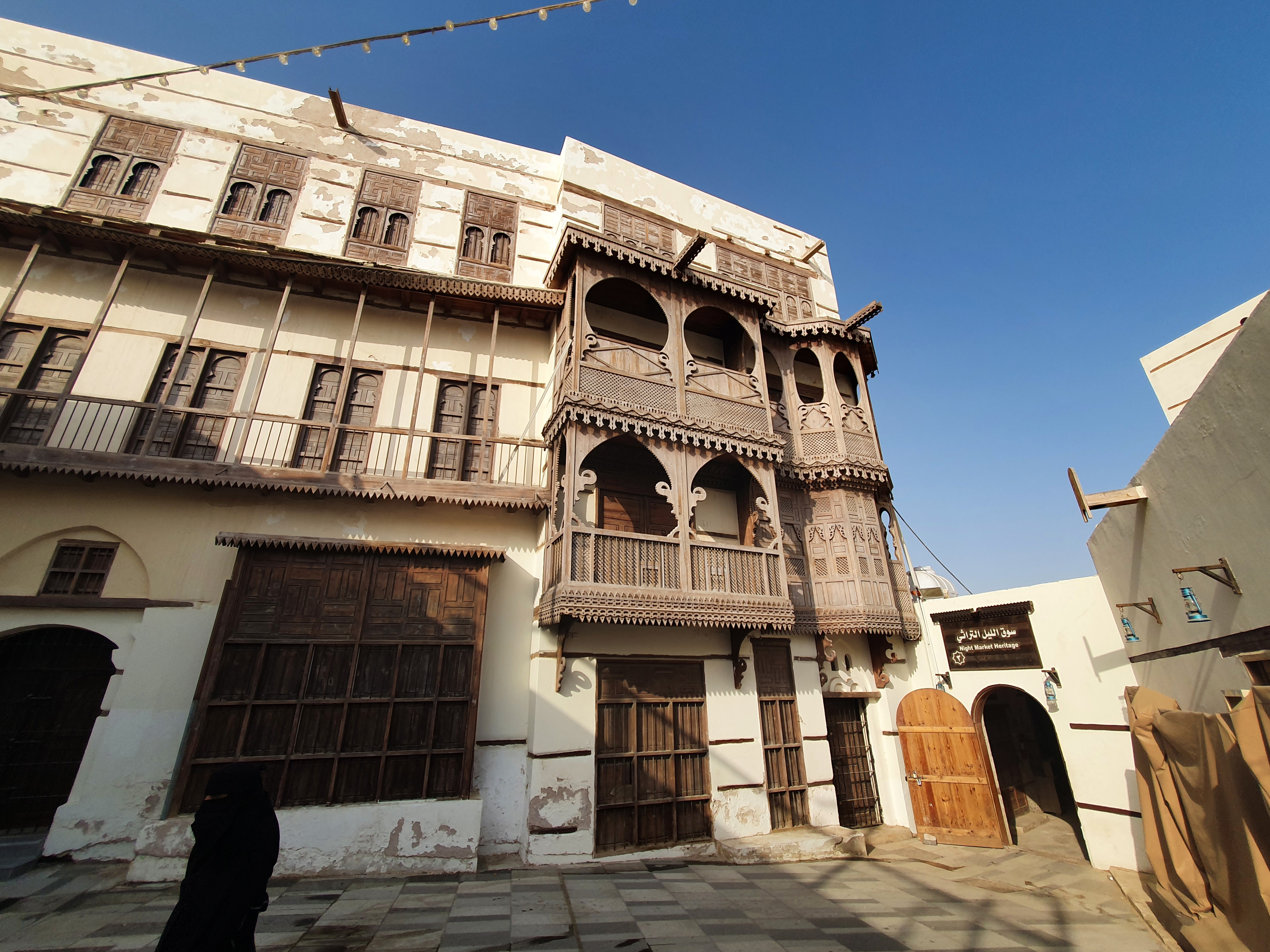
- Prophet's Mosque al-Ula Khaybar Old Yanbu

- Seal

- Map of Saudi Arabia with Madinah highlighted
- Coordinates: 25°0′N 39°30′E
- Country: Saudi Arabia
- Region: Hejaz
- Seat: Medina
- Governorates: 8

Government
  - Type: Development Authority / Municipality
  - Body: Medina Development Authority (Upper body); Medina Municipality (Lower body)
  - Municipal Commissioner: Fahd Al-Buliheshi
  - Governor: Salman bin Sultan
  - Deputy Governor: Saud bin Nahar

Area
  - Total: 151,990 km^{2} (58,680 sq mi)

Population (2022 census)
  - Total: 2,389,452
  - Density: 15.721/km^{2} (40.717/sq mi)
- Time zone: UTC+03:00 (SAST)
- ISO 3166-2: SA–03
- Area code: 014

Medina Province (Note: also known as the Medina Region and officially spelled Madinah (Arabic: منطقة المدينة المنورة, romanized: Minṭaqat al-Madīnah al-Munawwarah))) is a province of Saudi Arabia in the Hejaz region along the Red Sea coast. The provincial seat is Medina, the second-holiest city in Islam. Other historic cities in the province include Yanbu, Badr, and several others. The province also contains Hegra, a UNESCO World Heritage Site.

== History ==
The Medina Province shares its historical background with the city of Medina, including major events in early Islamic history such as the Battle of Badr and the establishment of Quba Mosque, the first mosque in Islam.

The province was created in 1925 following the Saudi conquest of the Hejaz and the absorption of the Kingdom of Hejaz into the Sultanate of Nejd, forming the Kingdom of Hejaz and Nejd in 1926, which was later renamed the Kingdom of Saudi Arabia in 1932. The modern provincial boundaries were defined later.

At the start of the 2020s, Medina launched the Humanizing Medina program, led by Fahd Al-Buliheshi, the Municipal Commissioner of Medina, under the supervision of the Medina Development Authority. The program aims to make the city and the surrounding province more walkable, sustainable, and accessible for residents and visitors. As part of this effort, the region has also begun incorporating traditional Hejazi architectural elements in new public projects, following the launch of the Saudi Architecture Map by Crown Prince Mohammed bin Salman in 2025.

== Population ==
Historical population
Year	Pop.	±% p.a.
1992	1,084,947	—
2004	1,512,724	+2.81%
2010	1,781,733	+2.77%
2022	2,389,452	+2.48%

== Governorates ==
Map of Medina Province

Medina Province comprises eight governorates, with Medina City serving as the seat of the province. The governorates are categorized into Category A and Category B based on the availability of services.

Seat
Governorate (A)
Governorate (B)

#	Governorate	2010 Census	2022 Census
–	Medina	1,183,205	1,477,047
1	Yanbu	299,526	359,631
2	al-Ula	64,482	60,103
3	Badr	64,209	58,259
4	Mahd Al-Dhahab	61,936	48,590
5	Khaybar	48,901	45,532
6	Al-Hunakiyah	59,474	43,256
7	Wadi al-Fara	35,382	23,120
8	Al-Ais	30,169	22,445

== Transportation ==
=== Air ===
Prince Mohammad bin Abdulaziz International Airport is the main airport in the Medina Province, serving domestic and international flights and handling 8,144,790 passengers in 2018. The airport project has received several international recognitions, including an award from Engineering News-Record in 2015 It was also the first airport in the region to receive LEED Gold certification.

The province is also served by Al-Ula International Airport in al-Ula governorate and Prince Abdulmohsen Bin Abdulaziz International Airport in Yanbu governorate.

=== Roads ===
The Medina Province is connected by major highways including Highway 15 and Highway 60, and is served by a network of ring roads around the provincial capital, including King Faisal, King Abdullah, and King Khalid Roads. In 2015, the Medina Development Authority began the Darb as-Sunnah project to upgrade the 3 kilometres (1.9 mi) route between the Quba Mosque and the Prophet's Mosque.

=== Bus ===
The province’s bus network, operated by SAPTCO, began in 2012 and includes 10 lines serving around 20,000 passengers daily.

=== Metro ===
The Medina Development Authority has proposed the Medina Metro, a three-line urban rail system planned to serve the provincial capital.

=== Rail ===
The Medina Province is served by the Haramain High Speed Railway, which opened in 2018 and links the province with Mecca, Jeddah, King Abdulaziz International Airport, and King Abdullah Economic City. The route is 444 kilometres (276 mi) long, operates at 300 km/h, and has a capacity of 60 million passengers annually.

=== Ports ===
Medina Province has two ports, both of which are located in Yanbu: Yanbu Commercial Port and King Fahd Industrial Port.

== Education ==
=== Universities ===
Taibah University is the principal public university in the Medina Province. It was established in 2003 following the merger of several colleges previously affiliated with King Abdulaziz University. It offers a wide range of undergraduate and postgraduate programs, including medicine, engineering, business administration, and computer science, and maintains branch campuses in Yanbu, al-Ula, and Mahd Al-Dhahab.

Islamic University of Madinah is an international public university founded in 1961, specializing in Islamic studies, Arabic language, Sharia, and related fields. It also offers programs in engineering and computer science. The university attracts students globally and provides a range of scholarships.

University of Prince Mugrin is a private, non-profit university established in 2017. It offers programs in business, engineering, architecture, and information technology, and is known for international academic partnerships and a focus on applied education.

=== Colleges of Technology ===
The Medina Province hosts multiple technical colleges for men and women, affiliated with the Technical and Vocational Training Corporation (TVTC). These institutions provide diploma and applied bachelor’s programs in engineering technologies, information technology, business support, and other vocational fields.

=== General Education ===
All public schools in the Medina Province, from elementary to secondary levels, are supervised by the Ministry of Education.

== Provincial government ==
The province is governed by a governor (Emir) appointed by the King of Saudi Arabia, assisted by a deputy governor.

Governor	Term of Office	Monarch(s)
Office established
Muhammad bin Abdulaziz	1925 – 1965	Abdulaziz, Saud, Faisal
Abdulmohsen bin Abdulaziz	1965 – 1985	Faisal, Khalid, Fahd
Abdul Majeed bin Abdulaziz	1985 – 1999	Fahd
Muqrin bin Abdulaziz	1999 – 2005	Fahd, Abdullah
Abdulaziz bin Majid	2005 – 2013	Abdullah
Faisal bin Salman	2013 – 2023	Abdullah, Salman
Salman bin Sultan	2023 – present	Salman

== See also ==
- Provinces of Saudi Arabia
- List of governorates of Saudi Arabia
- List of cities and towns in Saudi Arabia
- List of islands of Saudi Arabia
