= Cross-platform interchange =

Transfer station design

Diagram of a paired cross-platform interchange

A cross-platform interchange is a type of interchange between different lines at a metro (or other railway) station. The term originates with the London Underground; such layouts exist in other networks but are not commonly so named. In the United States and Canada, it is often referred to as a cross-platform transfer.

This configuration occurs at a station with island platforms, with a single platform in between the tracks allocated to two directions of travel, or two side platforms between the tracks, connected by level corridors. The benefit of this design is that passengers do not need to use stairs to another platform level for transfer. A cross-platform interchange arrangement may be costly to build due to the complexity of rail alignment, especially if the railway designers also arrange the track with flyovers (which is typically done to increase efficiency).

A typical bidirectional cross-platform interchange configuration consists of two outbound directions of two different lines sharing an island platform, and the respective return directions of both lines sharing a different island platform in the same station complex. Less common is a cross-platform interchange to transfer onto a continuation of same single line served by that station; examples of such interchanges include Headbolt Lane and Ormskirk in the United Kingdom, Pittsburg/Bay Point on the BART in California, and Estadio Metropolitano, Puerta de Arganda and Tres Olivos on the Madrid Metro.

== Types ==
The four cross-platform interchange stations in Taipei Metro, showing the tripartite-interchange system on the right

=== Between different lines ===
Common cross-platform interchanges allow passengers to change trains without changing to another platform. This applies at places where trains of different directions meet in minor and major hubs, but this arrangement is only found at some interchange stations in metro and other rail networks worldwide.

=== Between different train categories of the same line ===
Some railway lines, usually in more congested areas, also offer cross-platform interchanges between different categories of trains, for example between express and stopping ("local") trains. For instance, this kind of interchange is used at many European railway minor hubs to connect fast trains to local feeder services, as well as surface sections of suburban lines like the RER E in Paris or the Metro North Hudson Line in New York State. However, local–express interchanges are found in only a few metro networks, such as Chicago, Chengdu, London (as in the case of Stratford discussed below), New York City, and Philadelphia. The New York City Subway system has numerous stations facilitating cross-platform transfers between local and express trains, typically using pairs of island platforms, each serving express trains on one side, and local trains on the other side, with both alternatives headed in the same direction.

As express and stopping trains usually head for different directions, cross-platform interchange between different train categories (e.g. interchanges between metros and railways) is commonly combined with cross-platform interchanges between different lines.

Some stations offer cross-platform transfers between different modes, such as tram and bus, such as at Madeleine station in Charleroi, where two island platforms sit between a central bus lane and tram line on the outside. Similarly, light rail–bus connections can be found at Juniors Kingsford and Haymarket light rail stations in Sydney.

=== Continuation of travel in different trains ===
Ormskirk railway station in Lancashire, United Kingdom, was a double-track railway until 1970, when it was converted into single-track railway with the track split in the centre by buffer stops placed back-to-back. The two ends of the single platform terminate different routes, and interchange for through service is by walking along the platform.

Another peculiar configuration exists at Pittsburg/Bay Point station on the BART system in the San Francisco Bay area, California, United States. Mainline BART trains terminate at that station, but onward service is available via an eBART diesel multiple unit (DMU) train. At this station, eBART trains are only accessible through a cross-platform transfer at a dedicated platform 0.6 miles (0.97 km) east of the main station platform. Despite this transfer, the Yellow Line is mapped and signed as one continuous route.

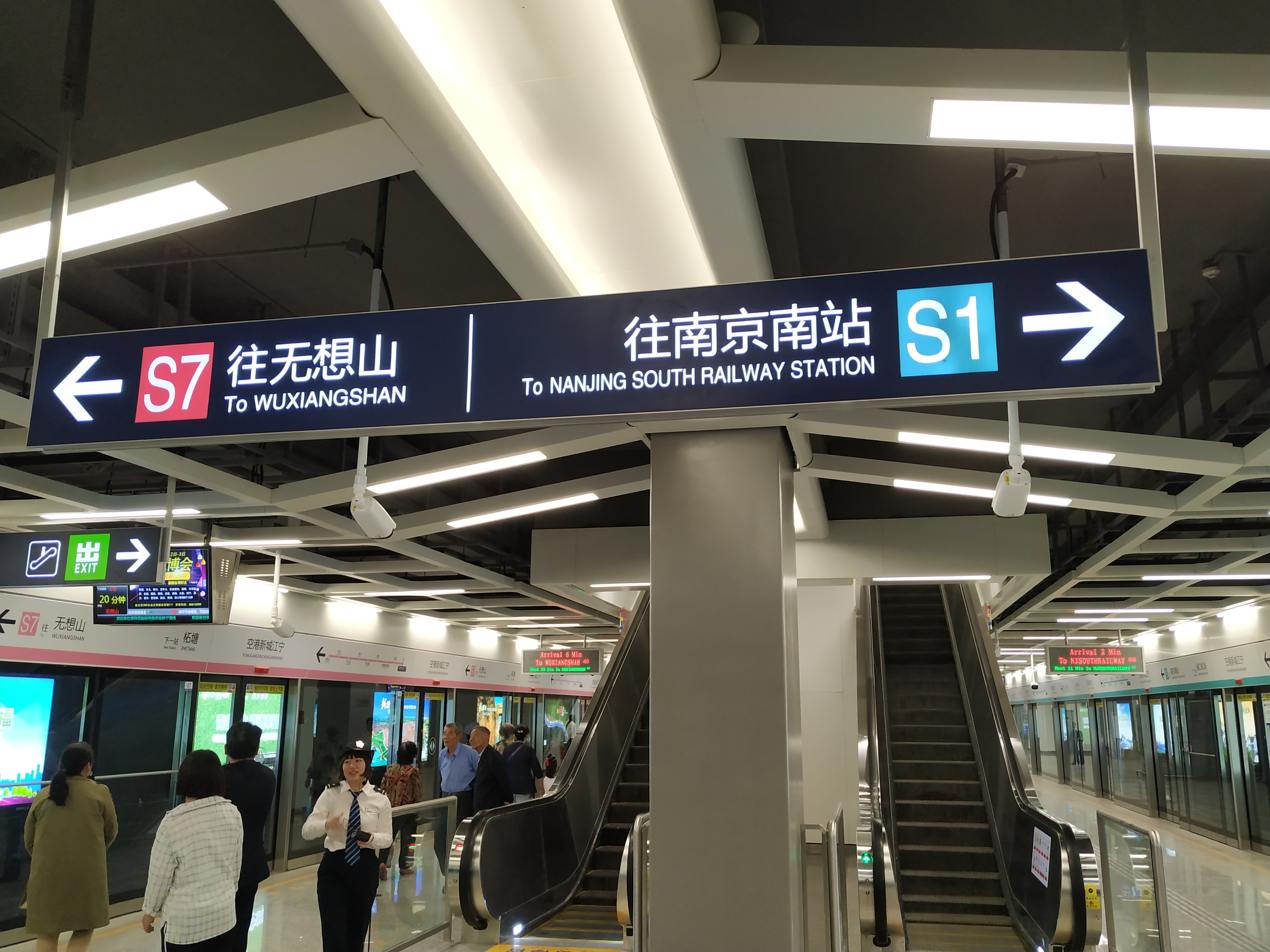
Single cross-platform interchange at Konggang Xincheng Jiangning station of Nanjing Metro, China, providing continuation of travel between Line S1 and S7.

Konggangxinchengjiangning station of Nanjing Metro, China is also a cross-platform terminal station for both Line S1 and S7, with a single island platform and crossovers set at both ends of station, letting trains of both lines to switch back.

Zhongli railway station in Taoyuan, Taiwan has a proposed cross-platform terminal plan for both Taoyuan Airport MRT and Green line of Taoyuan Metro. The station layout will be composed of two island platform, between which a connecting zone set to integrated the two into a single "large platform". Buffer stops will also be placed back-to back between Airport-bound trains and Green Line trains. The scheme is scheduled to complete in 2031.

== Service levels of connections ==
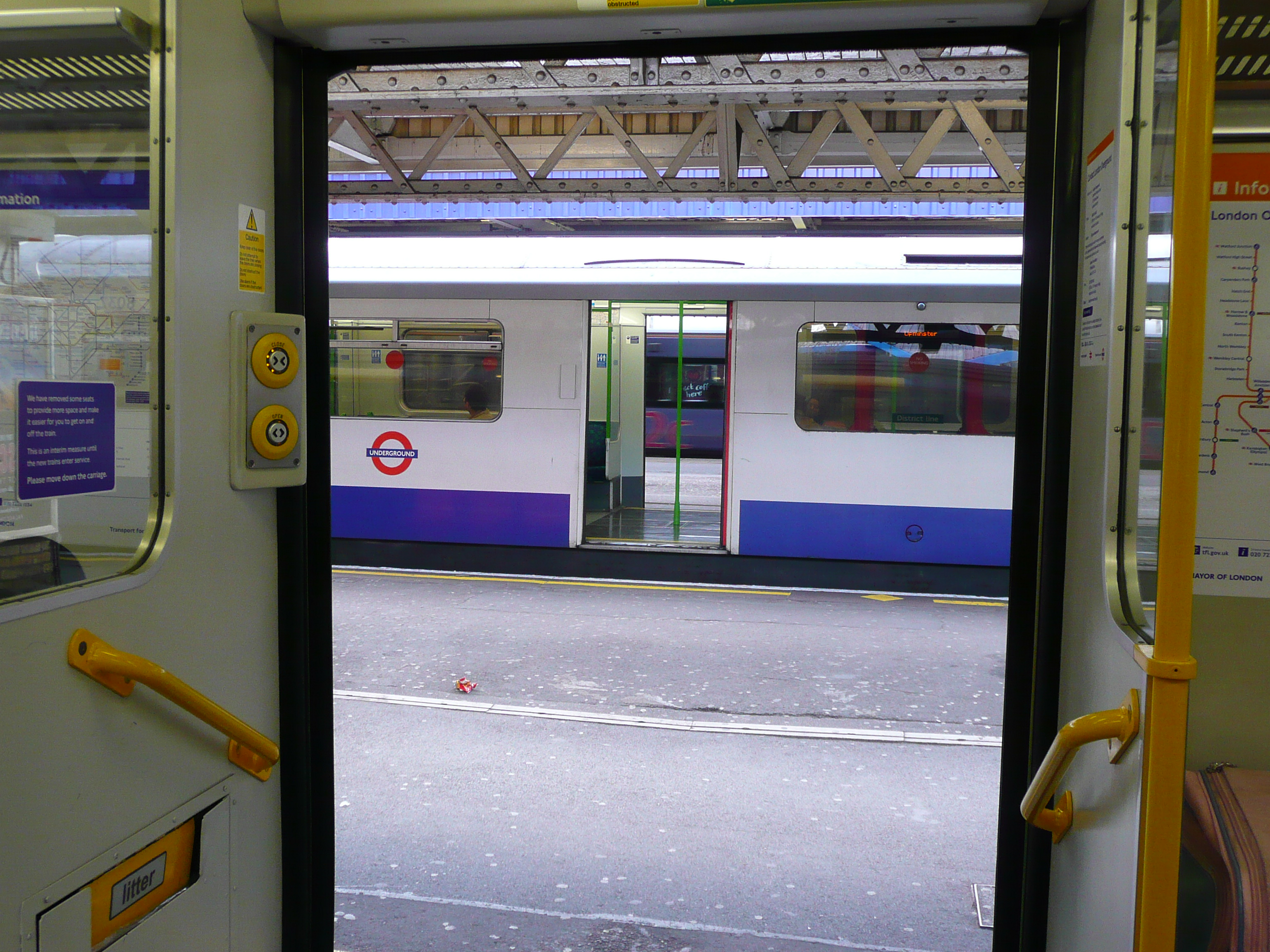
Double cross platform interchange looking from one train through another train (which has its doors open on both sides) to reveal a third train at Barking in London

In some, but not all, cases, the trains are coordinated in the timetable.

=== Noncoordinated ===
In this case, the cross-platform infrastructure offers the possibility of easily changing trains, independently from the waiting time for the second train. In metro systems with short headways, typical waiting time is small, but such a noncoordinated approach could reduce the advantages of stairless cross-platform interchange in railway networks with sparser train traffic.

=== Coordinated ===
A more-advanced approach involves the coordination of the lines' timetables to reduce the scheduled changing time, either from one line to the other, or ideally bidirectionally, between both trains simultaneously. Coordinated interchange is widely used in Dutch, German, and Swiss railway networks, where trains of different lines meet at the same platforms in numerous hubs all over the country.

=== Optimised, with connection guarantee ===
Most advanced are coordinated cross-platform interchanges wherein interconnected trains also wait for each other, to "guarantee" scheduled interchanges even in the event of modest delays. To limit schedule disruption propagation throughout the entire network, additional waiting time for trains is usually limited to a certain period of time, depending on general network performance, further connections to be guaranteed, train category, train line, and a balanced consideration of other factors.

In practice, most railways coordinating cross-platform interchanges define a certain waiting time window for each guaranteed interchange. Some railway operators will briefly delay train departure signals to allow imminently arriving passengers time to interchange. For example, the Vienna U-Bahn metro signals train drivers to wait briefly, by operating a special white light signal triggered by the approach of an interchange train on another track.

== Example interchanges ==
In most cases, only cross-platform interchanges used for both directions of travel are listed, with some exceptions.

=== Asia ===
==== Bangkok ====
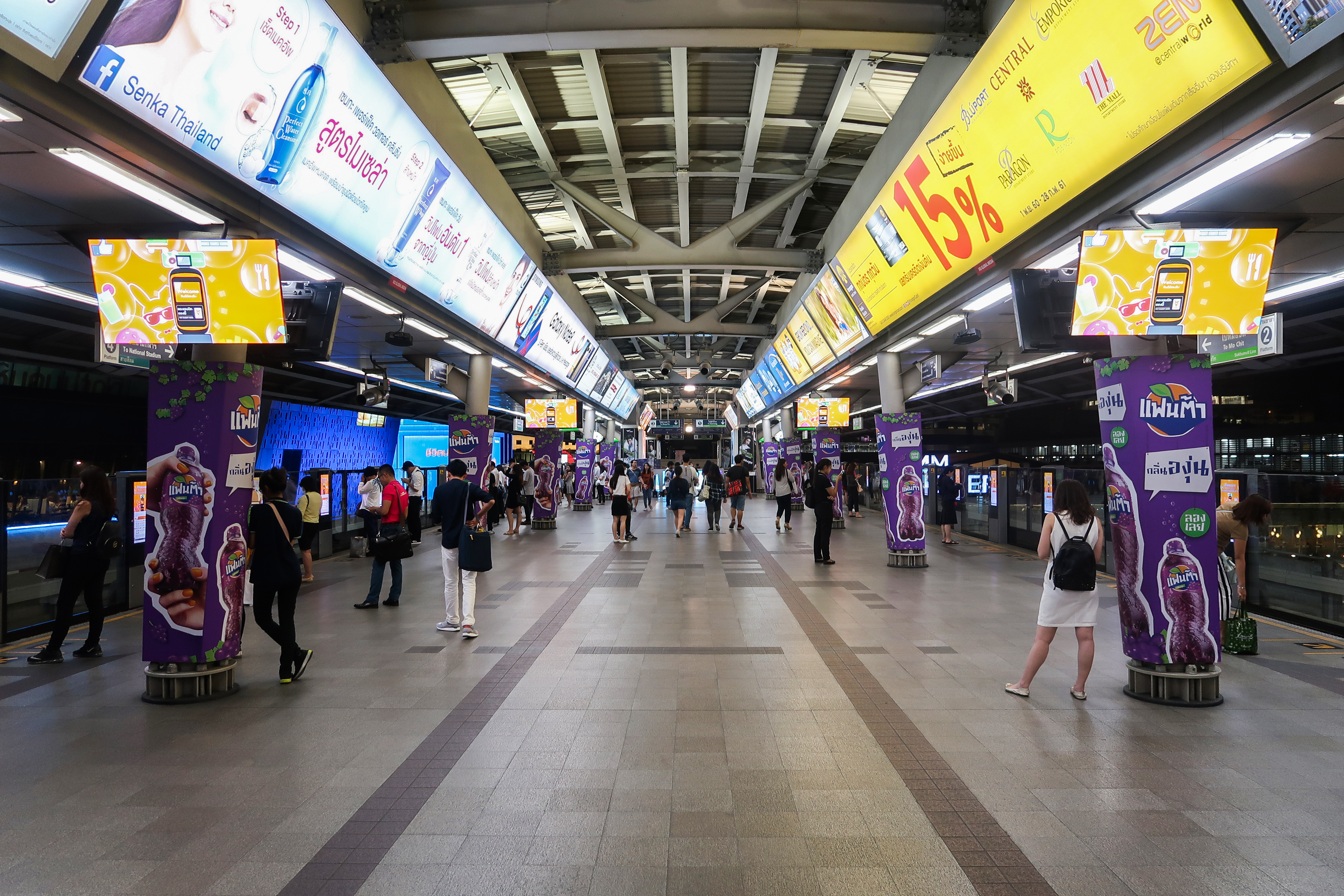
The upper-level platforms (2 and 4) of Siam Station serving westbound trains

Siam Station allows for a cross-platform transfer between the Sukhumvit line and the Silom line, both operated by the BTS, for trains heading in the same direction. Eastbound trains use the lower-level island platform, while the westbound trains depart from the upper-level platforms.

==== Beijing ====
Cross-platform interchanges are offered between Line 9 and Fangshan Line at Guogongzhuang, Lines 4 and 9 at National Library, Changping Line and Line 8 at Zhuxinzhuang, Lines 7 and 9 at Beijing West railway station, and Fangshan Line and Yanfang Line at Yancun East. In addition, cross-platform interchange is possible at Nanluoguxiang between Line 6 and 8 via level corridors. The Line 5 alighting platform and Yizhuang Line boarding platform at Songjiazhuang connect perpendicularly in a T-shape, allowing single-direction cross-platform interchange from Line 5 to Yizhuang Line.

==== Chengdu ====
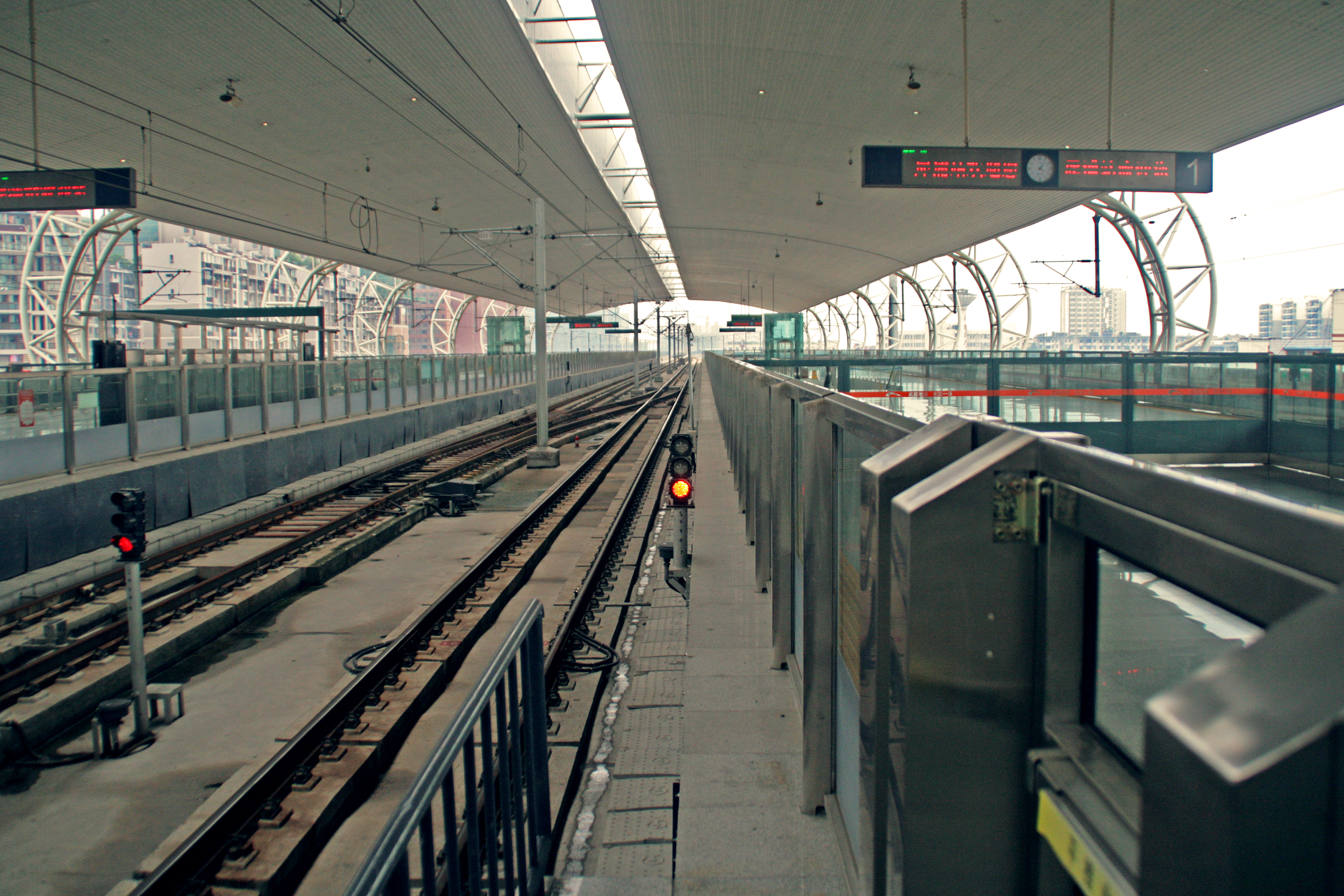
Cross-platform interchanges between different train categories in Xipu Railway Station, Chengdu. The double track of Line 2 of Chengdu Metro is in the middle, while the double tracks of national rail transport system (Chengdu–Dujiangyan intercity railway) are on both sides.

Xipu Station in Chengdu provides cross-platform interchange between Line 2 of Chengdu Metro and Chengdu–Dujiangyan Intercity Railway of the national rail transport system. It is the first implementation of cross-platform interchanges between different train categories in China. Metro-only cross-platform interchanges exist between Lines 2 and 4 at Chengdu University of TCM & Sichuan Provincial People's Hospital station, between Lines 5 and 6 at Xibeiqiao station, between Lines 17 and 19 at Jiujiang North station, between Lines 18 and S3 at Futian station and outbound direction interchanges between Lines 3 and 10 at Taipingyuan station.

==== Chongqing ====
Line 5 and Line 6 of the Chongqing Rail Transit offer a paired cross-platform interchange for passengers transferring among four directions between the two lines at Ranjiaba and Dalongshan stations. Same-direction cross-platform interchanges are also provided at Chongqing West Station between Line 5 and Loop line, Baoshuigang between Line 4 and Line 9, Shangwanlu between Line 10 and Line 9 and Wangjiazhuang between Line 6 (International Expo Branch) and Line 10. Meanwhile, an opposite-direction cross-platform interchange is provided at Jiangbeicheng between Line 6 and Line 9.

Aside from these, Min'an Ave. between Loop line and Line 4 is an exception. Due to the fact that Line 4 only uses one side of the platforms at this station, there formed a half cross-platform interchange.

==== Dalian ====
The Dalian Metro has a cross platform interchange between Line 1 and Line 12 at Hekou Station.

==== Delhi ====
The Delhi Metro has 4 cross-platform interchanges in total. These are located at the following stations:-

- Central Secretariat: Underground interchange between the Yellow Line and Violet Line
- Yamuna Bank: At-grade interchange between Line 3 (Main line) and Line 4 (Branch line) of the Blue Line
- Anand Vihar: Elevated interchange between Line 4 (Branch line) of the Blue Line and Pink Line
- Botanical Garden: Elevated interchange between Line 3 (Main line) of the Blue Line and Magenta Line

==== Fuzhou ====
Fuzhou Metro's Difengjiang station offers a cross-platform transfer between Line 4 and Line 5 and Liangcuo station between Line 1 and Line 6.

==== Guangzhou ====
Guangzhou Metro offers three two way cross-platform interchanges by 2016, between Line 2 and Line 3 at Jiahewanggang station, between Line 8 and the Guangfo Line at Shayuan station, between Line 22 and 18 at Panyu Square station, between Line 14 and 21 at Zhenlong station, between Line 11 and 21 at Tianhe Park station, one between both branches of Line 3 at Tiyu Xilu station and between Line 11 and 12 at Chisha Station. At Tiyu Xilu station the northern section of Line 3 terminates at the center track serving both island platforms connecting to the southern section of Line 3 stopping at the outer tracks. In 2016, a same-direction cross platform interchange started operating between the westbound Line 7 and northbound Line 2 trains at Guangzhou South Railway Station. Several cross platform interchanges are under construction. These include: Guangzhou Baiyun Railway Station (Line 12 and 24) and Caihongqiao station (Line 13 and 11).

==== Hangzhou ====
Hangzhou Metro's East Railway Station and Pengbu station offer paired cross-platform interchange between Line 1 and Line 4 and another paired cross-platform interchange at West Lake Cultural Square and Wulin Square stations between Line 1 and Line 3. Same-direction cross-platform interchange is offered between Line 2 and Line 4 at Qianjiang Road station, Coach Center between Line 1 and Line 9, Zhejiang Chinese Medical University station between Lines 4 and Line 6, Xintiandi Street station between Line 3 and Line 4, Guanyintang station between Line 7 and Line 9, South Xixi Wetland station between Line 3 main line and branch line (Line 14 future), Lvting Road station between Line 3 and Line 16 and West Railway Station between Line 3 and Line 19.

==== Hong Kong ====
A diagram showing the directions and cross-platform interchange stations between the Tsuen Wan line and the Kwun Tong line

In the Mass Transit Railway (MTR) system, cross-platform interchange stations first appeared at Mong Kok and Prince Edward stations in Kowloon when Tsuen Wan line was opened and took over the southern half of the Modified Initial System. The interchange is two platforms in sequence, with an opposite-direction cross-platform interchange assigned to Prince Edward and a same-direction interchange to Mong Kok, as large volumes of traffic had been anticipated in both modes.

Popular with passengers, this design was repeated on Admiralty station when the Island line in Victoria was opened to deal with anticipated heavy opposite-direction interchange ridership. Years later, another interchange spanning Tiu Keng Leng station (same direction) in the New Territories and Yau Tong station (opposite direction) in New Kowloon was built to the same configuration as the earlier Mong Kok and Prince Edward interchanges.

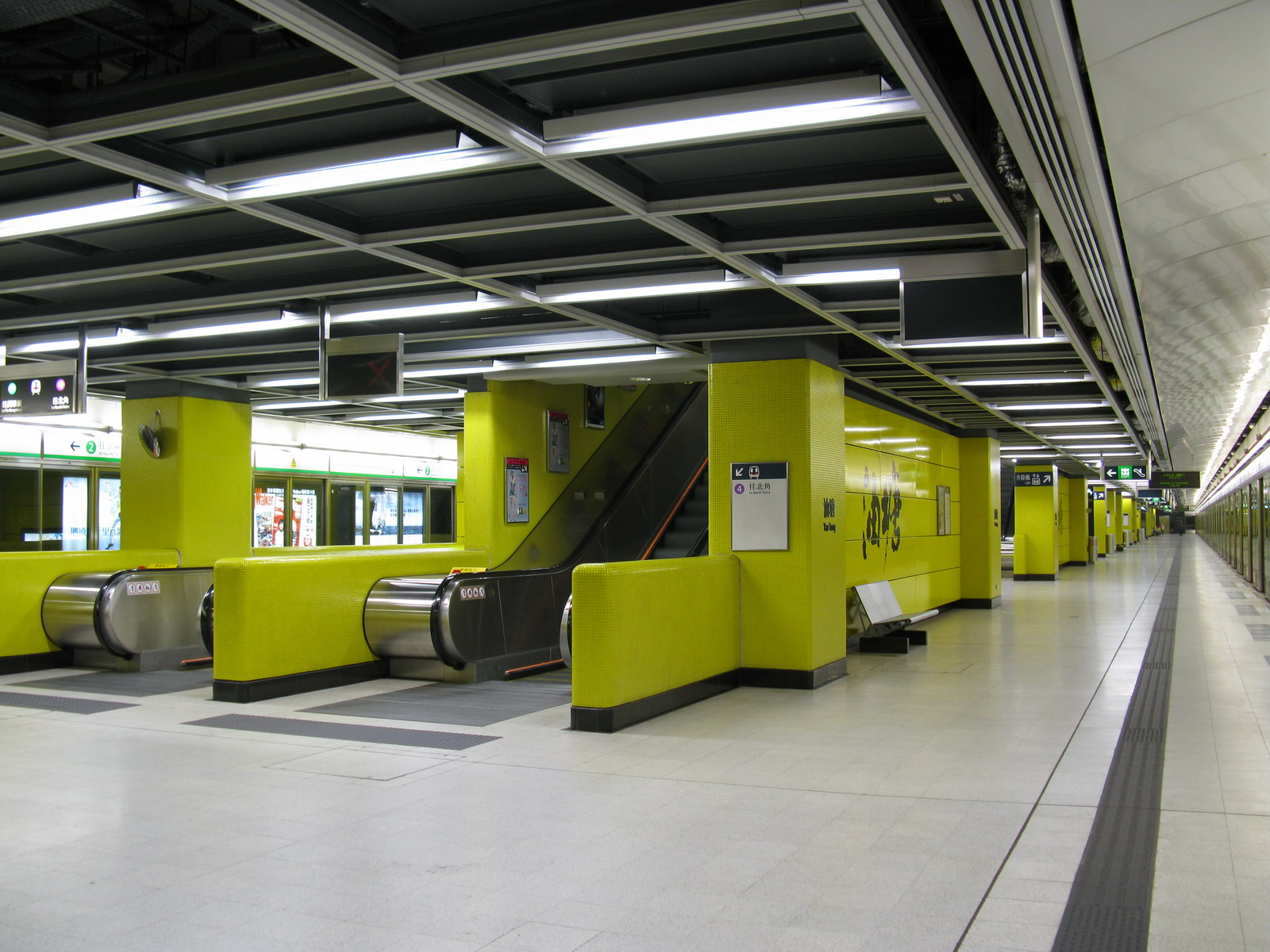
Yau Tong station cross-platform interchange

The Tuen Ma line is specifically designed to follow right-hand traffic rules (unlike other railway lines in Hong Kong), to enable a same-direction cross-platform interchange at Tai Wai station to the East Rail line while keeping the two southbound platforms connected via ramps.

Another configuration found in Lai King station makes commuting in both directions more convenient by aligning both tracks leading towards the city next to each other on one level, and both tracks leading away from city next to each other on another level. The configuration for North Point station is similar, to provide convenience for passengers traveling inbound, although the distance between the two platforms is longer compared to other stations.

Before the MTR–KCR merger in 2007, Nam Cheong station was served by MTR's Tung Chung line and KCR's then-called West Rail line. Due to the different fare systems, platforms of southbound Tung Chung Line and northbound West Rail were separated by barriers despite being at the same elevation, and interconnecting passageways were regulated with one instead of two sets of ticketing barriers. After the merger, some sections of the barrier were demolished in order to provide free cross-platform interchange between southbound Tung Chung Line and northbound Tuen Ma Line trains. However, this arrangement does not serve the dominant rush hour passenger flows, which are between New Territories and Hong Kong Island, as well as between Lantau Island and Tsim Sha Tsui.

To connect East Rail and the then called West Rail Line at Hung Hom without through-running, both lines were in the past terminated in the south there, alternating on both East/West Rail platforms to offer cross-platform interchanges. But after the station relocation in 2022, Hung Hom is no longer a cross platform interchange.

At Sunny Bay, passengers on the Tung Chung line from the city can make a cross-platform interchange to a Disneyland Resort line train. However, the inverse is not the case, so passengers returning to the city from Hong Kong Disneyland need to use an overpass to catch a Hong Kong-bound train.

==== Kuala Lumpur ====
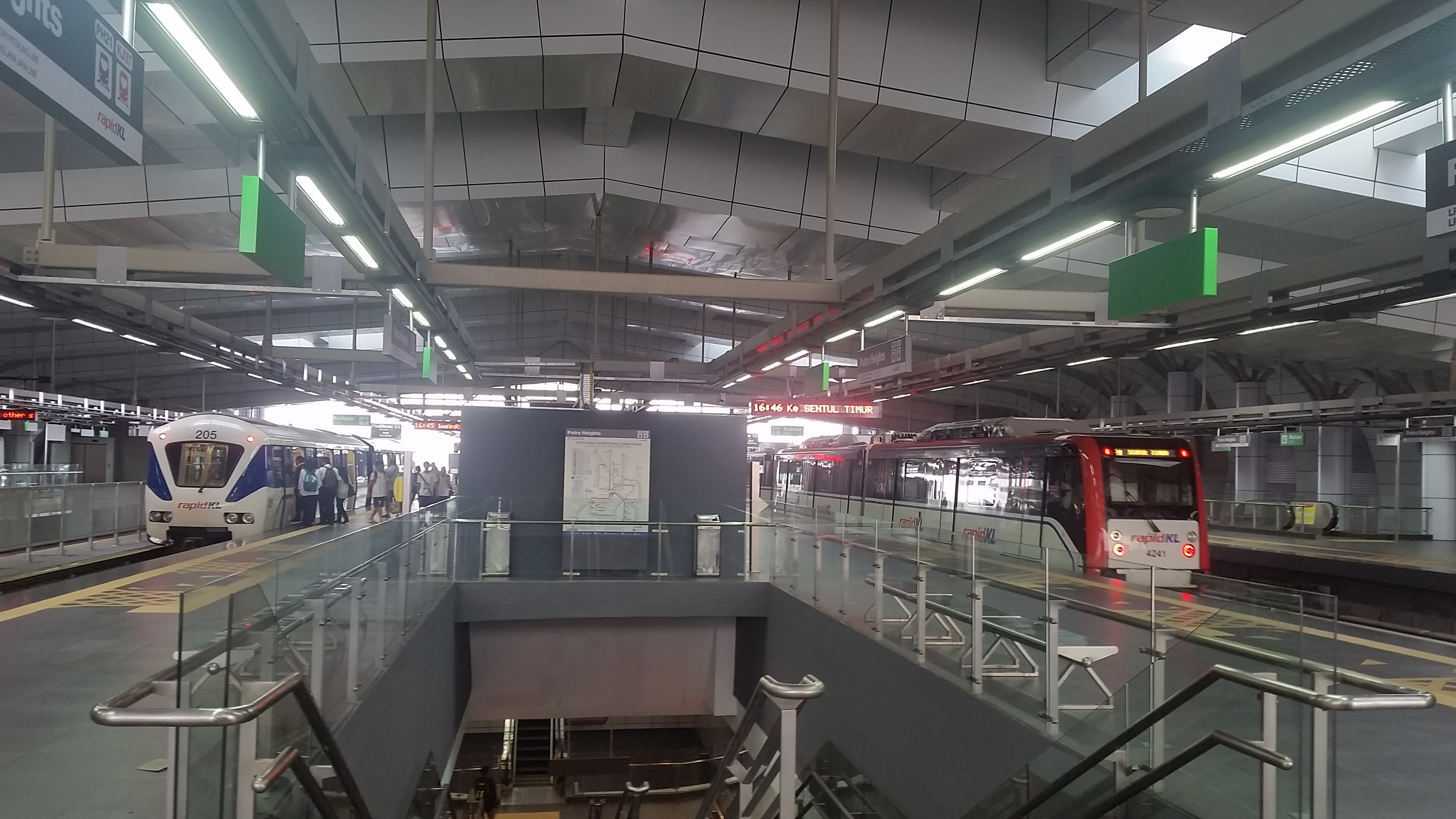
Putra Heights is an interchange station between 2 LRT lines-Sri Petaling Line and Kelana Jaya Line.

Putra Heights offers cross-platform interchange between Sri Petaling Line (Line 4) and Kelana Jaya Line (Line 5) while Chan Sow Lin offers cross-platform interchange between Ampang Line (Line 3) and Sri Petaling Line (Line 4). Tun Razak Exchange and Kwasa Damansara also offers cross-platform interchange between MRT Kajang Line and the MRT Putrajaya Line.

==== Kyoto ====
There is a cross-platform interchange between the Kyoto Municipal Subway Tozai Line and the Keihan Keishin Line at Misasagi.

==== Nanjing ====
Nanjing Metro's Nanjing South Railway Station offers cross-platform interchange between Lines 1 and 3 and same-direction cross-platform interchange between Line S1 and Line S3. In addition, a cross platform interchange is available at Xiangyulunan Station between Line S1 and Line S9, and Konggangxinchengjiangning Station between Line S1 and Line S7.

==== Nanning ====
A paired cross platform interchange is available between Line 1 and Line 2 at Nanning railway station and Chaoyang Square station. This configuration allows for North & East-bound and South & West-bound cross platform transfers at Nanning railway station, while Chaoyang Square station allows for North & West-bound and South & East-bound cross platform transfers.

==== Osaka ====
The Osaka Metro has a cross-platform interchange between the Midosuji Line and the Yotsubashi Line at Daikokuchō, where the platforms are at the same level.

Kintetsu Railway also has a cross-platform interchange between the Nara Line and the Osaka Line at Tsuruhashi, where the platforms are at the same level.

Hanshin Railway has a same direction cross-platform interchange between the Namba Line and Hanshin Main Line at Amagasaki.

Hankyū Railway has coordinated cross-platform interchanges between their Kōbe Line, Takarazuka Line, and Kyōto Line at Jūsō; and between its Kyōto Line and Senri Line at Awaji. They also offer coordinated cross-platform interchanges between express and local services on the same lines at many stations, such as at Katsura on the Kyōto Line; and at Nishinomiya-Kitaguchi on the Kōbe Line.

==== Qingdao ====
Cross-platform interchange is available between Line 2 and Line 3 at May 4th Square. Provisions for cross-platform interchange between Line 3 and Line 8 were made at Qingdao North Railway Station.

==== Seoul ====
Seoul Subway Geumjeong Station offers cross-platform transfer between Line 1 local services and all 4 services. Gimpo Airport Station also offers cross-platform transfer between all Line 9 services and AREX local service. Also several Line 1 stations offer cross-platform transfer between trains heading to Incheon or Cheonan/Sinchang.

==== Shanghai ====
Oriental Sports Center Station offers cross-platform interchange between Lines 6 and 11. In addition, Hongqiao Railway Station provides cross platform interchange between Lines 2 and 17. While Hongqiao Airport Terminal 2 Station provides a same-direction cross-platform interchange between the Line 2 Pudong International Airport bound trains and Line 10 Xinjiangwancheng bound trains. Shanghai Railway Station and Zhongshan Park also offer cross-platform interchanges between Outer Loop Line 4 trains and Shanghai South Railway Station bound Line 3 trains and Inner Loop Line 4 trains and North Jiangyang Road bound Line 3 trains, as the two lines share a portion of the same track.

==== Shenzhen ====
Shenzhen metro network includes cross-platform interchanges at Laojie (Lines 1 and 3), Huangbeiling (Lines 2 and 5), Chegongmiao (Lines 7 and 9), Hongshuwan South (Lines 9 and 11), Nanyou (Lines 9 and 12), Huangmugang (Lines 7 and 14), Gangxia North (Lines 11 and 14), and Universiade (Lines 14 and 16) stations. Reservations have been made for future cross platform interchanges at Luohu North (Lines 14 and 17), Xiangmihu West (Lines 14 and 20), Xinsheng (Lines 3 and 21), and Aobei (Lines 14 and 21) stations.

==== Singapore ====
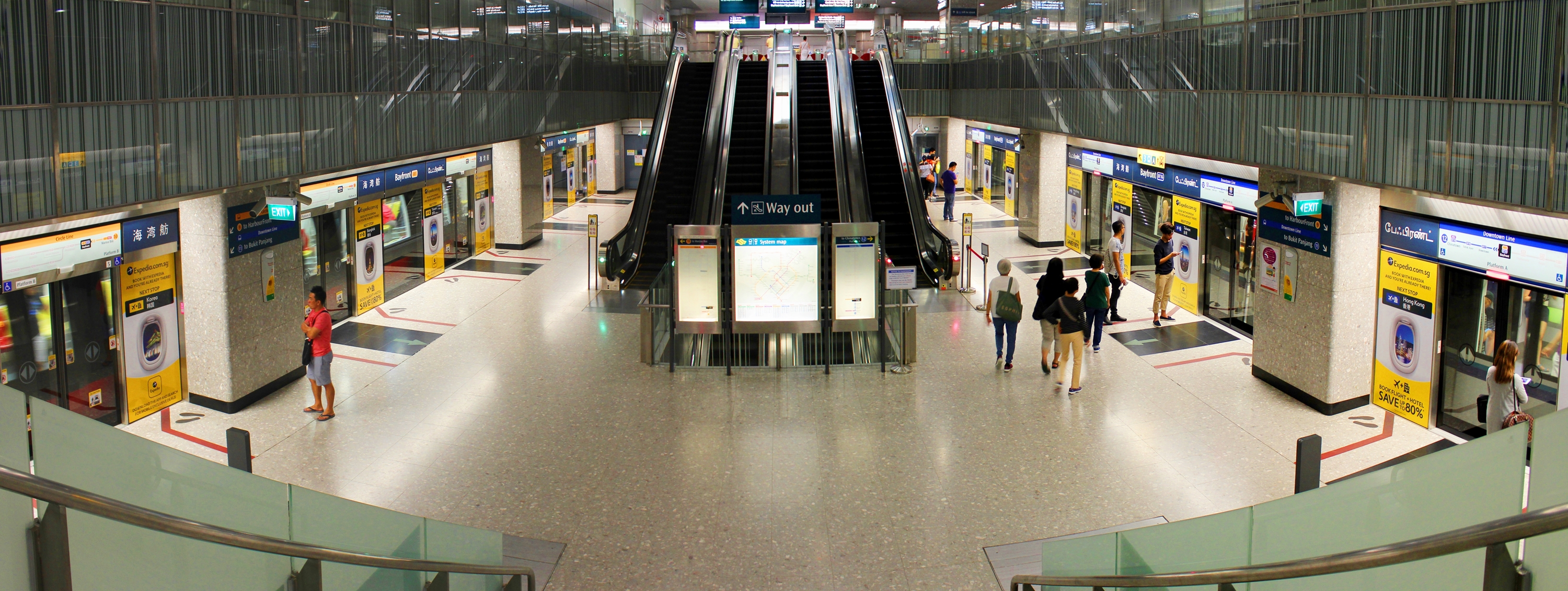
Bayfront interchange in Singapore

The Mass Rapid Transit system in Singapore has a similar two-station transfer arrangement to allow quick transfers between North–South and East–West lines. Both City Hall MRT station and Raffles Place MRT station have double underground island platforms stacked on top the other, allowing commuters to switch trains to a different line by walking across the same platform at the appropriate station.

Jurong East MRT station has a less complicated arrangement, with the terminating rail for the North–South Line aligned between that of the East–West Line, allowing commuters to alight and board simultaneously on either side, with an additional rail for the North–South Line used during peak hours. Tanah Merah MRT station also has a similar arrangement, with the terminating rail for the East West line Changi Airport Extension aligned between the two the East West line platforms, allowing commuters to alight and board simultaneously on either side too.

The Bayfront MRT station is also a cross-platform interchange with double underground island platforms between the Marina Bay branch of the Circle Line and Downtown Line. The original plans for Promenade MRT station contained a similar arrangement but the existing Circle Line tracks to and from Dhoby Ghaut need to be crossed at the same levels by Downtown Line trains. Thus, Bayfront MRT station is the only station on the MRT system which offers cross-platform interchange between two different operators' MRT lines (SBS Transit operates the Downtown Line whilst SMRT operates the Circle Line).

==== Tehran ====
Sadeghieh metro station of Tehran metro offers cross-platform interchanges between both terminating metro lines 2 and 5; while suburban line 5 uses the outer tail tracks of each platform, metro line 2 uses one platform for alighting and the other for boarding. Line 2 uses platforms 2 and 3, and Line 5 uses platforms 1 and 4. Eram-e Sabz metro station also has a cross-platform interchange. It has a cross platform interchange between Lines 4 and 5. Line 4 uses platforms 1 and 4, and Line 5 uses platforms 2 and 3.

==== Taipei ====
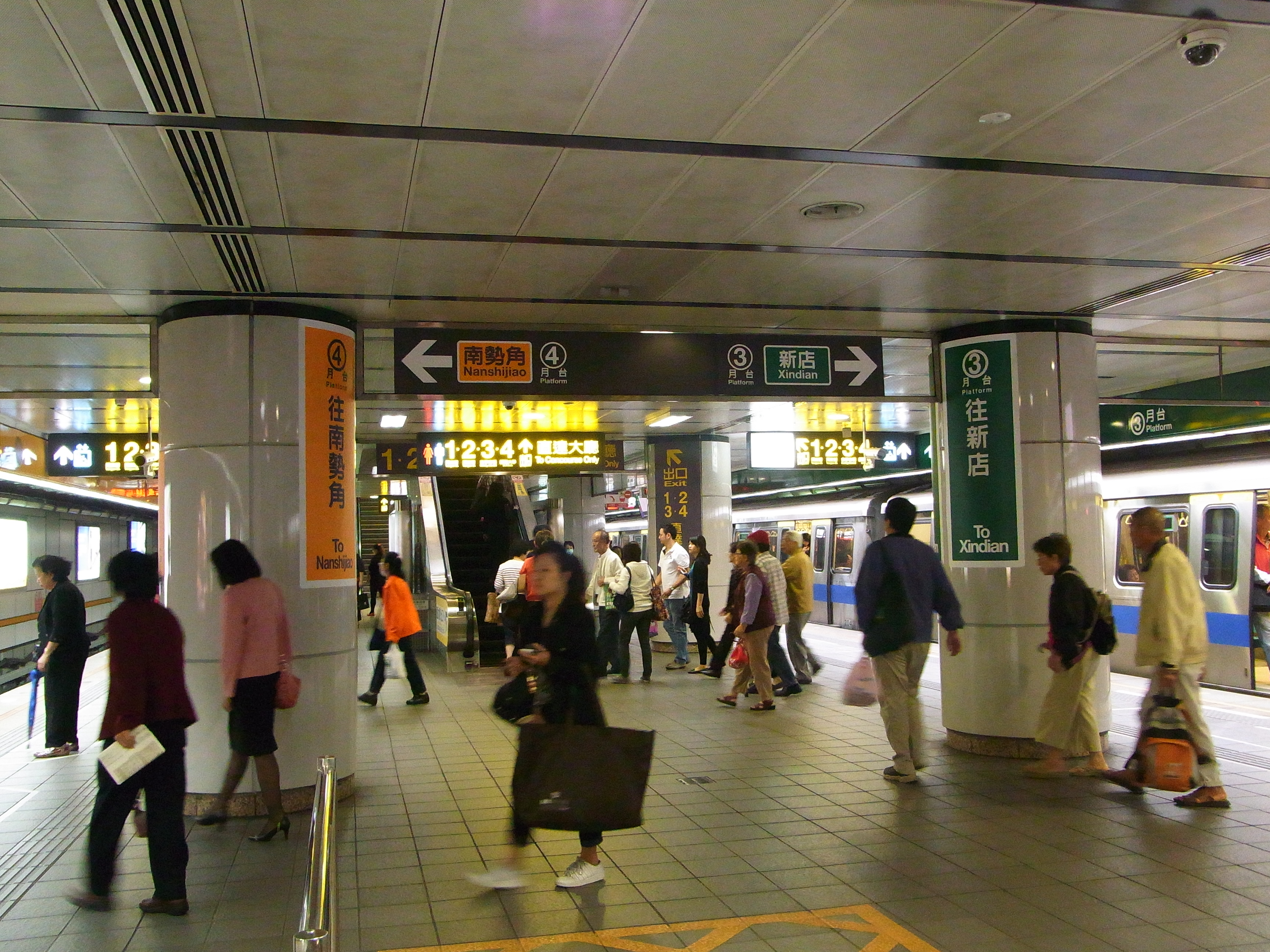
Guting station, a main interchange station of Taipei Metro, provides cross-platform interchange between the Songshan–Xindian line (Green Line) and Zhonghe–Xinlu line (Orange Line) in Taipei, Taiwan.

The Taipei Metro has four stations for cross-platform interchanges: Chiang Kai-shek Memorial Hall (between the Songshan–Xindian line and Tamsui–Xinyi line), Ximen (between the Songshan–Xindian line and Bannan line), Guting (between the Songshan–Xindian line and the Zhonghe–Xinlu line) and Dongmen (between Zhonghe–Xinlu line and the Tamsui–Xinyi line). All these stations have two island platforms on different floors, most of them are same-direction cross-platform configuration except Dongmen Station which has an inverse cross-platform.

Beitou Station allows for cross-platform transfers for southbound trains only due to differing operating routes.

==== Tokyo ====
Akasaka-mitsuke station track diagram, showing how cross-platform transfer works

In the Tokyo Metro, Akasaka-mitsuke Station provides cross-platform transfer between Ginza Line and Marunouchi Line.

At Omotesandō Station, transfer between Ginza Line and Hanzōmon Line can be done on its two island platforms at the same level. Shirokane-takanawa Station uses the same way to offer cross-platform interchange between Namboku Line and Mita Line.

At Kudanshita Station, cross-platform interchange is possible between a Shinjuku bound Shinjuku Line train and an Oshiage bound Hanzōmon Line train.

In Shinjuku Station, transfers between JR East's Yamanote Line and Chūō–Sōbu Line use directional cross-platform interchange on two parallel island platforms. Between Tamachi and Tabata, there are cross-platform interchanges between the Yamanote Line and the Keihin-Tohoku Line. At Ochanomizu Station, there is a cross-platform interchange between the Chūō–Sōbu Line and the Chūō Rapid Line.

In the Tokyu Railway network at Ōokayama Station, cross platform interchange is provided between the Meguro Line and the Ōimachi Line. In addition Naka-Meguro Station provides cross platform interchange is available between the Tōkyū Tōyoko Line and Tokyo Metro Hibiya Line, and Futako-Tamagawa Station provides a cross platform interchange between the Tōkyū Den-en-toshi Line and Tōkyū Ōimachi Line.

==== Wuhan ====
Wuhan's paired cross-platform transfer

Line 2 and Line 4 of Wuhan Metro's Hongshan Square station and Zhongnan Road station offer paired cross-platform interchange for passengers transferring among four directions of the two lines. Two more cross platform interchanges opened in Wuhan at Zhongjiacun station between Line 4 and Line 6, and Hongtu Boulevard station between Line 2 and Line 3.

==== Zhengzhou ====
A number of cross platform interchanges are reserved across the system with Shibalihe station reserving same direction cross-platform interchange between Line 2 and Line 9 (Chengjiao line), Zhengzhou East Railway Station reserves same direction cross-platform interchange between Line 5 and Line 8, Zhangjiacun station reserves same direction cross-platform interchange between Line 4 and Line 7 and Yaozhuang station reserves same direction cross-platform interchange between Line 4 and Line 16.

=== Europe ===
==== Amsterdam ====
Amsterdam metro network includes cross-platform interchanges at Van der Madeweg station between metro lines 50 and 53 and at Amsterdam South station between metro lines 50 and 52. Further, cross-platform connections are offered at Amstel station between metro lines 51, 53, 54 and suburban and intercity services of Netherlands Railways.

==== Barcelona ====
The Barcelona Metro has two cross-platform transfers, one between L2 and L3 at Paral·lel station and the other between L6 and L12 at Sarrià station.

==== Berlin ====
The Berlin suburban rail network includes cross-platform transfers at Berlin East and at Baumschulenweg / Schöneweide, Bornholmer Straße, Gesundbrunnen, Treptower Park and Wannsee suburban railway stations.

Berlin metro services offer cross-platform connections at Mehringdamm (metro lines U6/U7), Nollendorfplatz (metro line U4 with outbound lines U1/U3) and Wittenbergplatz (metro lines U2/U3, outbound also U1) metro stations.

Additionally, Wuhletal station offers cross-platform interchanges between lines S5 of Berlin suburban rail and U5 of Berlin metro.

Jungfernheide metro station was built for cross-platform interchanges between line U7 and an extended line U5 towards Tegel Airport; the extension plan was abandoned following the decision to replace Tegel Airport with Berlin Brandenburg Airport. A part of one of the U5 tunnels is used by Berlin firefighters for fire and rescue training in a metro tunnel with an original train taken out-of-service. Similar provisions were also made at Schloßstraße metro station for cross-platform interchanges between line U9 and a never realised line U10.

==== Bochum ====
In Bochum's light rail and tram network (operated by Bogestra), a cross-platform interchange is offered at Bochum Hauptbahnhof (Bochum Main Railway Station) between light rail line U35 and sub-surface tram lines 302 and 310 on the lower level of the underground light rail station complex. U35 and 302/310 services to the south and southeast, and to the north and north-east stop at the same platforms.

==== Brussels ====
Brussels South railway station offers an interesting example of double-level cross-platform interchange, where the goal is to make it easier for passengers to "double back". The metro and premetro lines interweave so that, for example, one can arrive on the metro 2 or 6 from the north-east, walk across the island platform, and catch a tram 3 or 4 going south-east. Passengers making this journey in the opposite direction use the level below. Similar cross-platform interchanges offers Beekkant station between metro lines 1/5 and 2/6; in this area, lines 1/5 run on the right while lines 2/6 run on the left due to historical layout when formerly line 1B between Herrmann Debroux and Roi Baudoin stations branched off line 1B (running between Stockel and Erasme stations) and line 1A needed to change driving direction at Beekkant station. At Brussels North premetro station cross platform interchange is offered between tram lines 25 and 55 coming from Schaerbeek to the premetro lines 3 and 4 towards the city center.

==== Bucharest ====
Basarab station of metro lines M1 and M4 is the only cross-platform interchange in the Bucharest metro network where lines cross each other.

==== Charleroi ====
The Charleroi light rail system includes two stations, Beaux-Arts and Waterloo, with possible cross-platform interchanges.

==== Cologne ====
The only cross-platform interchange of the Cologne premetro network is Ebertplatz station, where passengers can change easily between high and low floor lines sharing an island platform for each direction.

==== Copenhagen ====
The Copenhagen suburban network contains cross-platform interchanges between circle line F and lines B, C, E at Hellerup station.

==== Duisburg ====
Duisburg Stadtbahn includes two cross-platform interchange stations, Duisburg Hauptbahnhof (Duisburg Main Railway Station) for same-direction interchange and König-Heinrich-Platz station for opposite-direction interchange.

==== Düsseldorf ====
Düsseldorf premetro network contains a four-track route between Düsseldorf Hauptbahnhof (Düsseldorf Main Railway Station) and Heinrich-Heine-Allee station comprising two island platforms for same-direction cross-platform interchange at each station; while at both mentioned stations, the two platforms are located parallel, they are built one above the other at both intermediate stations.

==== Essen ====
Essen Stadtbahn includes two stations with cross-platform interchange on two parallel island platforms at Essen Hauptbahnhof (Essen Main Railway Station) and Essen Rathaus station; cross-platform connections at Essen Hauptbahnhof are between standard-gauge premetro lines and metre-gauge sub-surface tram lines.

==== Frankfurt (Main) ====
At Konstablerwache station, Frankfurt's suburban train lines S1 to S6, S8 and S9 and Frankfurt premetro lines U6 and U7 share one island platform for each direction, with the suburban railway (inner) side of the platforms being much longer than for the premetro. Also, the premetro station located at Frankfurt (Main) Hauptbahnhof (Frankfurt Main Railway Station) was once designed for cross-platform transfers between different Frankfurt premetro lines but is now only used by premetro lines U4/U5 running along the same corridor.

==== Hamburg ====
Hamburg metro offers cross-platform interchanges at Barmbek (between circle and branch of metro line U3), Berliner Tor (between metro lines U2/U4 and U3), Kellinghusenstraße (between metro lines U1 and U3) and Wandsbek-Gartenstadt (between metro lines U1 and U3) metro stations; all cross-platform interchanges are also timetable coordinated to make it as easy and convenient for the passengers as possible.

Another cross-platform interchange is used at the northwestern terminus of metro line U1 at Norderstedt Mitte station where metros use the outer tracks and interconnect with the non-electrified suburban line A2 of AKN private railway company terminating on the center track in between the two island platforms.

Hamburg suburban railway offers cross-platform interchanges at Altona station and Hamburg Hauptbahnhof (Hamburg Main Railway Station) ensuring short connections for four of five branches to both inner city routes.

==== Hanover ====
Hanover premetro offers two cross-platform interchanges, one at Hannover Hauptbahnhof (Hanover Main Railway Station) and one at Aegidientorplatz station.

==== London ====
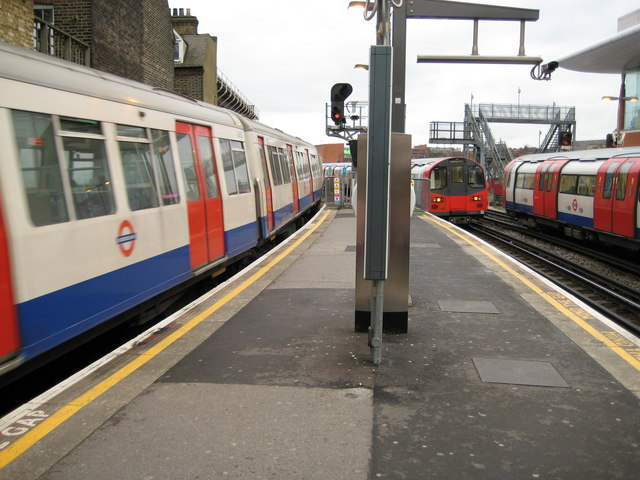
Cross-platform transfer at Finchley Road

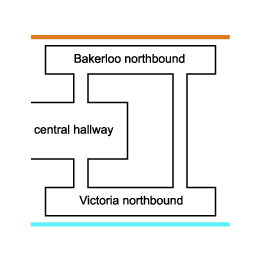
Simplified diagram of a Cross-platform interchange at Oxford Circus tube station, between the Bakerloo line and the Victoria line

In London's deep-level tube network, these usually occur in pairs for both directions of two lines. This allows for extremely quick and convenient interchange. The effect is that the two lines, despite having completely separate operation, can be treated by passengers as branches of a single network.

Examples include:

- Several slow and fast services have multiple cross-platform interchanges. Finchley Road offers cross platform transfers between the fast Metropolitan line and slow Jubilee line at surface level before diverging from Wembley Park. Acton Town, Barons Court, Turnham Green and Hammersmith all have cross platform transfers between the fast Piccadilly line and the slow District line.
- Mile End has cross platform transfers between the District/Hammersmith & City and Central lines at sub-surface level.
- Barking has cross platform transfers between District/Hammersmith & City lines and c2c services from platform 3, 4, 5 and 6.
- Stratford has cross platform between the Central line and Elizabeth line services.
- For the deep-level interchanges the term "same level interchange" is sometimes preferred as there is invariably an intermediate circulating area between the platforms. Convenient same level interchanges feature at various Victoria line stations, including Stockwell with the Northern line and Euston with the Bank branch of the Northern line; Oxford Circus with the Bakerloo line; Finsbury Park with the Piccadilly line; and Highbury and Islington with the Northern City Line. There is also a cross platform interchange at Baker Street between the Bakerloo and Jubilee lines, and a cross platform interchange at Kennington between the Charing Cross and Bank branches of the Northern line, which during normal service times operates as two separate branches south of Camden Town.

==== Lisbon ====
The Lisbon Metro has two stations with an island platform and two side platforms (with the island platform being used for same-direction cross-platform interchanges between lines entering downtown Lisbon): Baixa-Chiado (Lisbon Metro) (which has an inbound cross-platform transfer between the Green Line and the Blue Line) and Campo Grande (which has an inbound cross-platform transfer between the Green Line and the Yellow Line). Transfers between trains leaving downtown Lisbon require passengers to change platforms.

Lisbon regional rail has cross-platform interchanges on the belt line within Lisbon as well as on the Sintra line, where Sintra line trains connect with Azambuja line trains.

==== Liverpool ====
Kirkby railway station (until 1977) and Ormskirk railway station (until 1970) were double-track railway, when they were converted into single-track railway with cross-platform interchange.

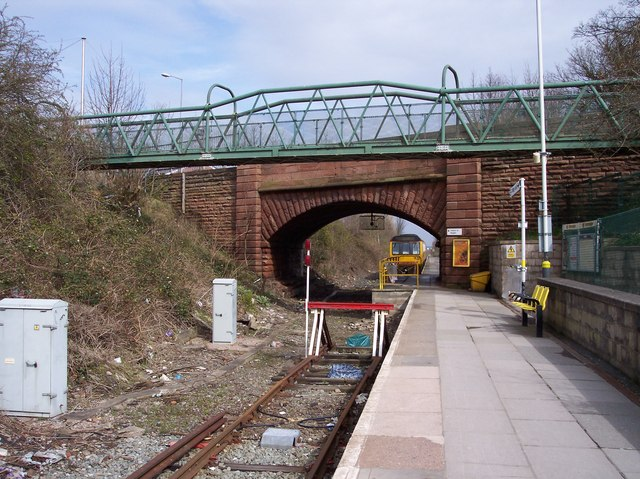
Kirkby railway station single-track railway interchange (former double-track railway)

==== Madrid ====
Madrid Metro uses cross-platform interchanges mainly for easy transfer between urban and suburban sections operated separately on metro lines 7 (Estadio Olimpico), 9 (Puerta de Arganda) and 10 (Tres Olivos). At Casa de Campo station, metro lines 5 and 10 are interconnected cross-platform with line 5 terminating on center track in between the island platforms shared with line 10. At Principe Pio station, metro lines 6 and 10 share an island platform for each direction. Further applications of cross-platform interchanges connect only one direction of each line, for example at Pinar de Chamartín station between metro lines 1 and 4.

==== Milan ====
Cadorna FN station on Milan Metro serves as interchange between M1 and M2 lines (the other one is Loreto). Each line is served by a couple of side platforms located on the same level. This provides a direct link between M1 northbound platform (towards Sesto 1° Maggio) and M2 southbound platform (towards Abbiategrasso or Assago Milanofiori Forum). All the other connections have to be done through the upper level mezzanine.

==== Moscow ====
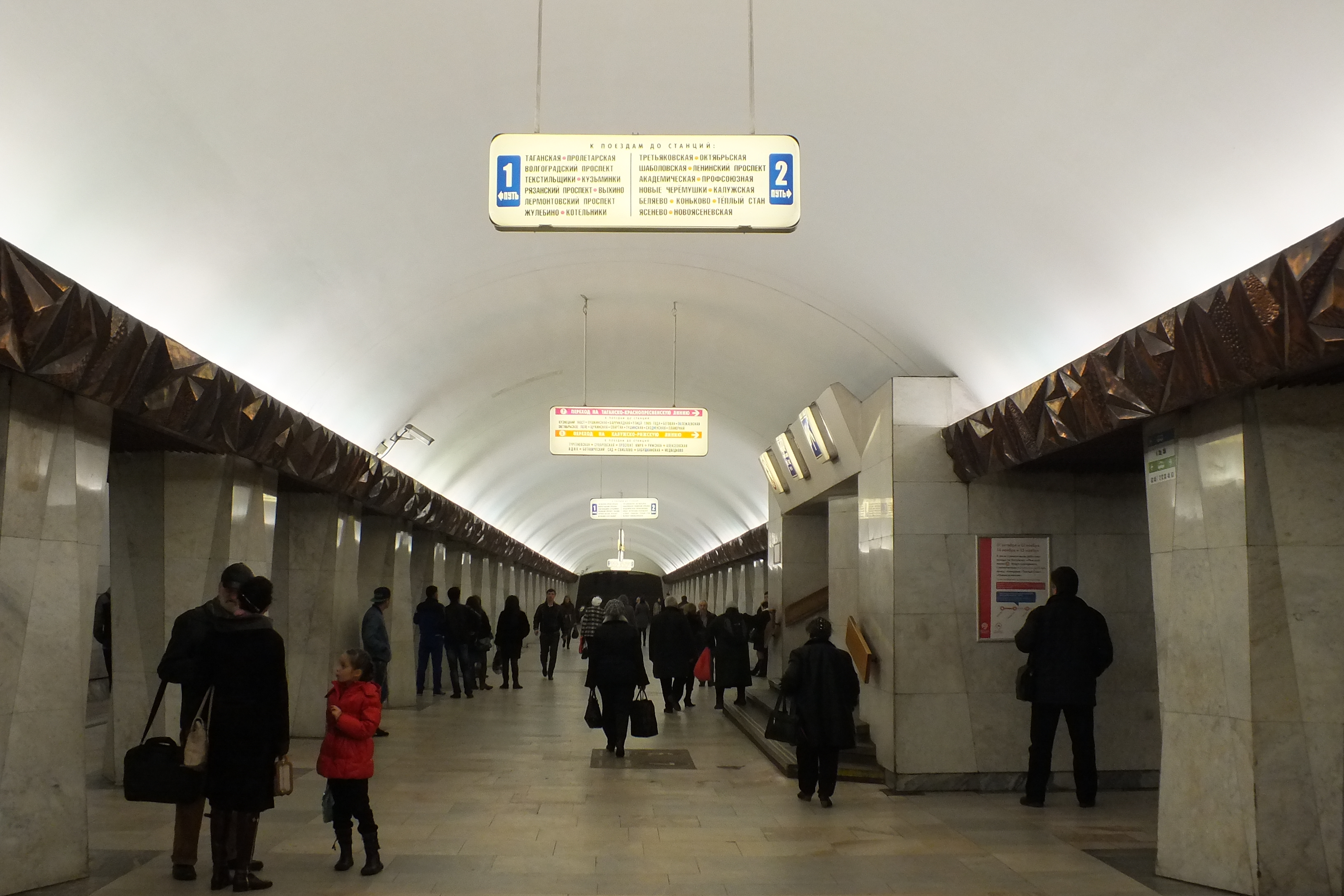
Kitay-gorod station, interchange signs

Some stations in the Moscow Metro utilize cross-platform interchanges. They include Kitay-gorod, Tretyakovskaya and Kashirskaya.

==== Mülheim (Ruhr) ====
Mülheim located roughly in the centre of the Rhein-Ruhr premetro network offers selected cross-platform interchanges at Mülheim (Ruhr) Hauptbahnhof (Mülheim Main Railway Station).

==== Munich ====
Munich metro offers coordinated cross-platform connections at both Scheidplatz (metro lines U2/U3) and Innsbrucker Ring (metro lines U2/U5) metro stations; all same-direction connections are optimised, so that usually U2 and U3 respectively U5 trains of the same direction arrive, stop and depart at the same time.

Neuperlach Süd is a combined station for Munich metro and Munich suburban rail. Original plans intended cross-platform interchanges in both directions at parallel island platforms. However, Munich suburban rail is still single-track there, and offers therefore only cross-platform interchange in the outbound direction and from outbound (terminating) Munich metro U5 services to inbound Munich suburban rail S7 services. Although possible, the arrival and departure times of both lines are not matched together.

Within the Munich S-Bahn (suburban rail) network, Westkreuz, Giesing, Berg am Laim and Besucherpark junction stations offer cross-platform interchanges for transfers between both branches. Under discussion are cross-platform interchanges in the same running direction for connecting the central bypass to the existing trunk route at least at Laim and Leuchtenbergring stations.

At Donnersbergerbrücke suburban station, cross-platform interchanges can be made in the same running direction between the S-Bahn lines along the trunk route and lines S7, S27, BOB; although not interconnected by timetables. However, the S-Bahn lines along the trunk route run frequently during most of the day: every 2 to 6 minutes on lines except S7, and every 2 to 4 minutes including the S7.

At Ostbahnhof, cross-platform interchanges have been possible since 2004 between regional trains from Rosenheim and Mühldorf to S-Bahn lines towards Ebersberg, Erding and Munich Airport (only in these directions).

Further cross-platform interchanges between Munich S-Bahn and regional trains can be made at Freising, Petershausen, Geltendorf, Grafing Bahnhof and Markt Schwaben stations, as Munich S-Bahn partly runs on mainline tracks anyway.

==== Nuremberg ====
Nuremberg metro includes one cross-platform interchange between metro lines U1/U11 and U2/U21/U3 at underground Plärrer metro station where the outbound metro platform is located above the inbound.

==== Nizhny Novgorod ====
Nizhny Novgorod metro's Moskovskaya station is prepared to offer cross-platform interchanges at a later point of time between both metro lines; before 2012, both lines terminate there and are connected to through running operation eliminating any needs to change trains. After an extension was completed for Line 1 beyond Moskovskaya station, cross-platform interchange was put in use to transfer between both lines.

==== Paris ====
Paris Métro has cross-platform interchange at La Motte-Picquet – Grenelle stations between Paris Métro line 8 and line 10, as well as Louis Blanc (Paris Metro) between Paris Metro Line 7 and Paris Metro Line 7bis.

Paris RER suburban network includes cross-platform interchanges between trains of different lines at several major hubs:

- Châtelet - Les Halles between lines RER A and RER B
- Paris North station between lines RER B and RER D

It also includes cross-platform interchanges between express and local trains at several stations of the RER suburban network:

- RER B at Massy - Palaiseau
- RER E at Val de Fontenay. Its final station Chelles - Gournay also offers cross-platform interchange between local RER E trains and express Transilien P trains.

==== Rhine-Ruhr area ====
The suburban services in the German Rhine-Ruhr area include cross-platform interchanges at Dortmund-Dorstfeld station between lines S2 and S4 (including coordinated timetables), at Düsseldorf Hauptbahnhof and at Essen Hauptbahnhof.

For information about the Rhine-Ruhr Stadtbahn (premetro) network, see among the related cities (Bochum, Dortmund, Düsseldorf, Essen, Mülheim).

==== St. Petersburg ====
Tekhnologichesky Institut offers cross-platform interchange between lines 1 and 2.

Sportivnaya will have a cross-platform interchange between lines 5 and 8, but line 8 is not built yet.

==== Stockholm ====
The Stockholm Metro includes cross-platform interchanges at T-Centralen (Main Railway Station), Gamla stan and Slussen metro stations between the Red and Green lines, where T-Centralen (Main Railway Station) offers opposite-direction connections while the latter two make cross-platform connections possible in the same direction. Additionally, passengers between Nockebybanan and the Metro Green Line can change cross-platform at Alvik station. Södertälje hamn railway station on the Stockholm commuter rail network provides an optimised transfer between the J40, J41 and J48 lines.

==== Vienna ====
Vienna metro optimised cross-platform connections at Längenfeldgasse station between lines U4 and U6 by demanding trains to wait as soon as the connecting train is approaching in case of delays or during different train intervals operated; this additional functionality is carried out by a special white light signal demanding the driver to wait. Before line U2 was extended from Schottenring further east, U2 trains terminated at (upper) U4 platform level on a center track sharing platforms with U4 trains on both sides; originally, this station level had been used for merging U2 and U4 lines and consisted of 4 tracks with 2 island platforms, but both platforms were merged to a single island platform after U2 extension opened.

==== Weesp ====
The Weesp railway station railway lines towards Amsterdam Centraal station and Schiphol railway station to the west and Hilversum and Flevoland to the east come together, and offer a cross-platform transfer in the same cardinal directions, with train arrival times coördinated. Because local trains are overtaken by intercity trains (who do not stop here), local trains stand at the station a long time (sometimes 11 minutes scheduled, on trains with a 15mn headway).

=== North America ===
==== Boston ====
An inbound-only cross-platform transfer is provided between the MBTA Orange Line and Green Line at North Station. Outbound transfers must be done by changing levels. There is another cross-platform interchange at Kenmore so riders can transfer among the different Green Line branches.

==== Chicago ====
In the Chicago "L" metro network, Howard, Wilson, Belmont, and Fullerton stations offer cross-platform interchange in the same direction between different services on the North Side Main Line. All stations are served by the Red Line at all times and by the Purple Line at peak times; the Brown Line and Yellow Line also serve some of these stations. The Metra Electric District and South Shore Line also have a cross-platform setup at 57th Street station. However, due to a non-competition agreement, South Shore Line passengers can only transfer to the Metra Electric District northbound to Millennium Station while Metra Electric District passengers can only transfer to the South Shore Line southbound to South Bend or Dyer.

==== Jersey City and Newark ====
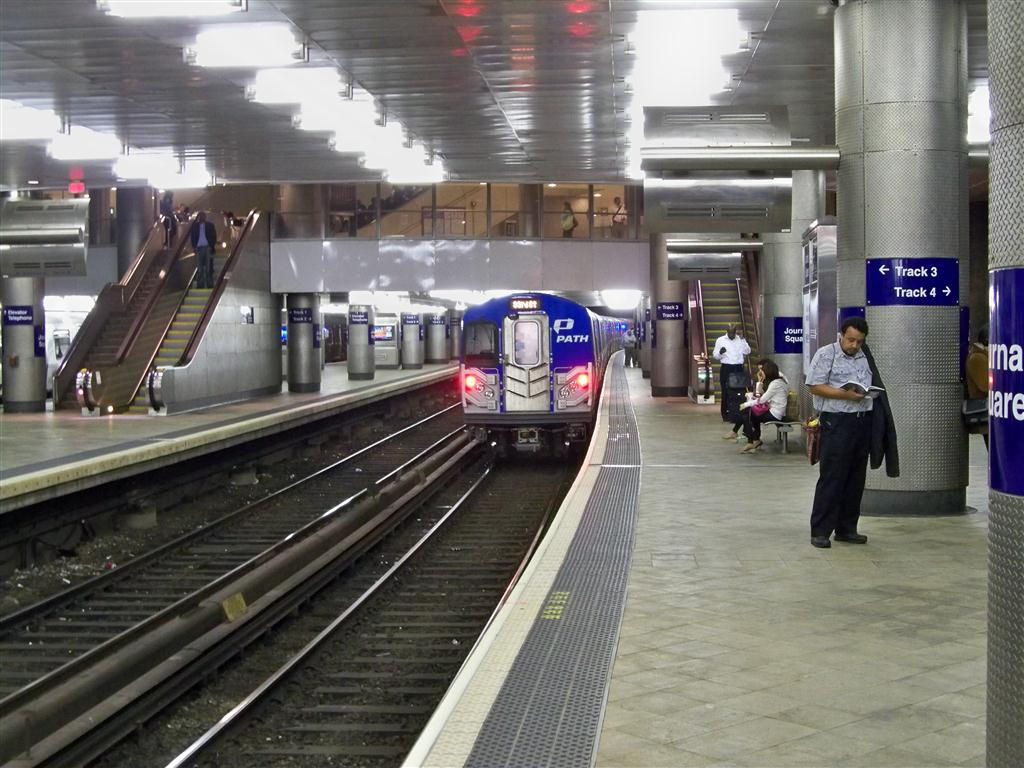
Signage for cross-platform transfer at Journal Square

The PATH system, serving the New York metropolitan area, contains cross-platform interchanges in Jersey City and Newark, New Jersey. At Journal Square Transportation Center in Jersey City, there is a cross-platform transfer between terminating Journal Square–33rd Street and Journal Square–33rd Street (via Hoboken) trains, connecting to through Newark–World Trade Center trains. At Pennsylvania Station in Newark, there is a cross-platform interchange between Newark–World Trade Center and NJ Transit trains bound for New York City. Newark Penn Station also contains a cross-platform interchange for NJ Transit trains coming from New York City.

A paid cross-platform connection exists between the Port Authority Trans-Hudson (PATH) rapid transit system and Amtrak and NJT trains at Newark Penn Station, allowing passengers to switch to trains to the World Trade Center.

==== Montreal ====
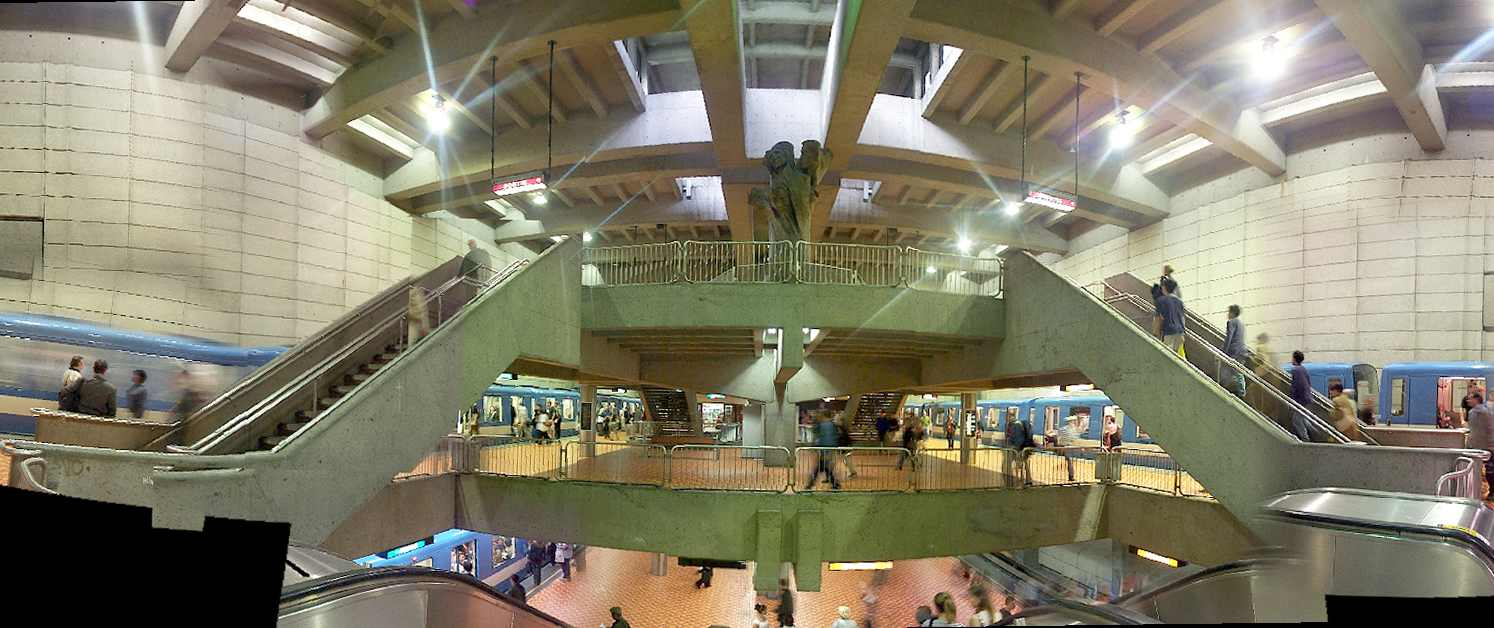
Lionel-Groulx station in Montreal

Two transfer stations in Montreal feature cross-platform interchange. At the Lionel-Groulx station, the upper platforms serve Henri-Bourassa or Montmorency (Orange Line 2) and Honoré-Beaugrand (Green Line 1) trains, entering downtown; the lower platforms serve Côte-Vertu (Orange Line 2) and Angrignon (Green Line 1) trains, leaving downtown. Since most transferring passengers are either entering or leaving downtown, most transfers at this station are cross-platform.

At the Snowdon station, however, the outbound Orange Line platforms are at the same level as the Blue Line terminal platform, with the inbound Orange Line platforms linked to the Blue Line departure platform, reducing efficiency. This is explained because the Blue Line was originally planned to be continued west of the station, in which case this arrangement would have provided the same benefit as the arrangement at Lionel-Groulx.

==== New York City ====
The New York City Subway has many three- or four-track lines with local and express service. Cross-platform interchanges are located in numerous locations throughout the system to allow for convenient transfers between express and local trains. In general, express trains run on the inner pair of tracks and bypass local-only stations, while local trains run on the outer pair of tracks and stop at every station. Express stations typically have island platforms between the express and local tracks, allowing passengers to quickly switch between trains heading in the same direction simply by crossing a platform.

In addition to the very common express-local interchanges, the New York City Subway also has several cross-platform interchanges between lines that do not share a three- or four-track right-of-way:

- The Queensboro Plaza station contains a same-directional cross-platform transfer between the IRT Flushing Line (7 and <7> trains) and BMT Astoria Line (N and W trains).
- The Hoyt–Schermerhorn Streets and Jay Street–MetroTech stations in Brooklyn allow cross-platform interchanges between the G train of the IND Crosstown Line with the A and C trains of the IND Fulton Street Line, the F and <F> trains of the IND Culver Line, respectively.
- At the Seventh Avenue–53rd Street station, there is a feature unique to the system, as anti-directional cross-platform interchanges can be made here (albeit between trains heading in the same general cardinal direction, due to the track layout near the station).
- The DeKalb Avenue and Prospect Park stations on the BMT Brighton Line (B and Q trains) in Brooklyn feature cross-platform interchanges to the BMT Fourth Avenue Line (N, R, and W trains) and the BMT Franklin Avenue Line (S train), respectively.
- The Lexington Avenue–63rd Street station in Manhattan has a cross-platform interchange between the two 63rd Street Lines (M and Q trains).

The Jamaica hub station of the Long Island Rail Road (LIRR) features cross-platform interchanges among the many services that stop there.

The LIRR's electrified Ronkonkoma Branch extends over non-electrified tracks to Greenport station with diesel trains, requiring a transfer. At Ronkonkoma, the two tracks are served by side platforms for passengers wanting to get off at this station, and an island platform for passengers transferring between trains. Trains use the spanish solution, opening doors on both sides.

==== Philadelphia ====
The SEPTA Metro B has cross-platform interchanges between local and express trains at Olney Transit Center, Erie, Girard, Spring Garden, Race-Vine, 15th Street/City Hall, and Walnut–Locust station.

==== San Francisco Bay Area ====
Three adjacent Bay Area Rapid Transit (BART) stations – 12th Street Oakland City Center, 19th Street Oakland, and MacArthur – have cross-platform transfers between northbound Yellow Line and Orange Line trains, with 19th Street Oakland as the designated northbound timed transfer point and MacArthur for southbound. East of Pittsburg/Bay Point, there is a dedicated transfer platform between the main BART system and eBART, for continuation of travel inbound or outbound. The SFO–Millbrae shuttle service also provides timed cross-platform transfers at San Francisco International Airport.

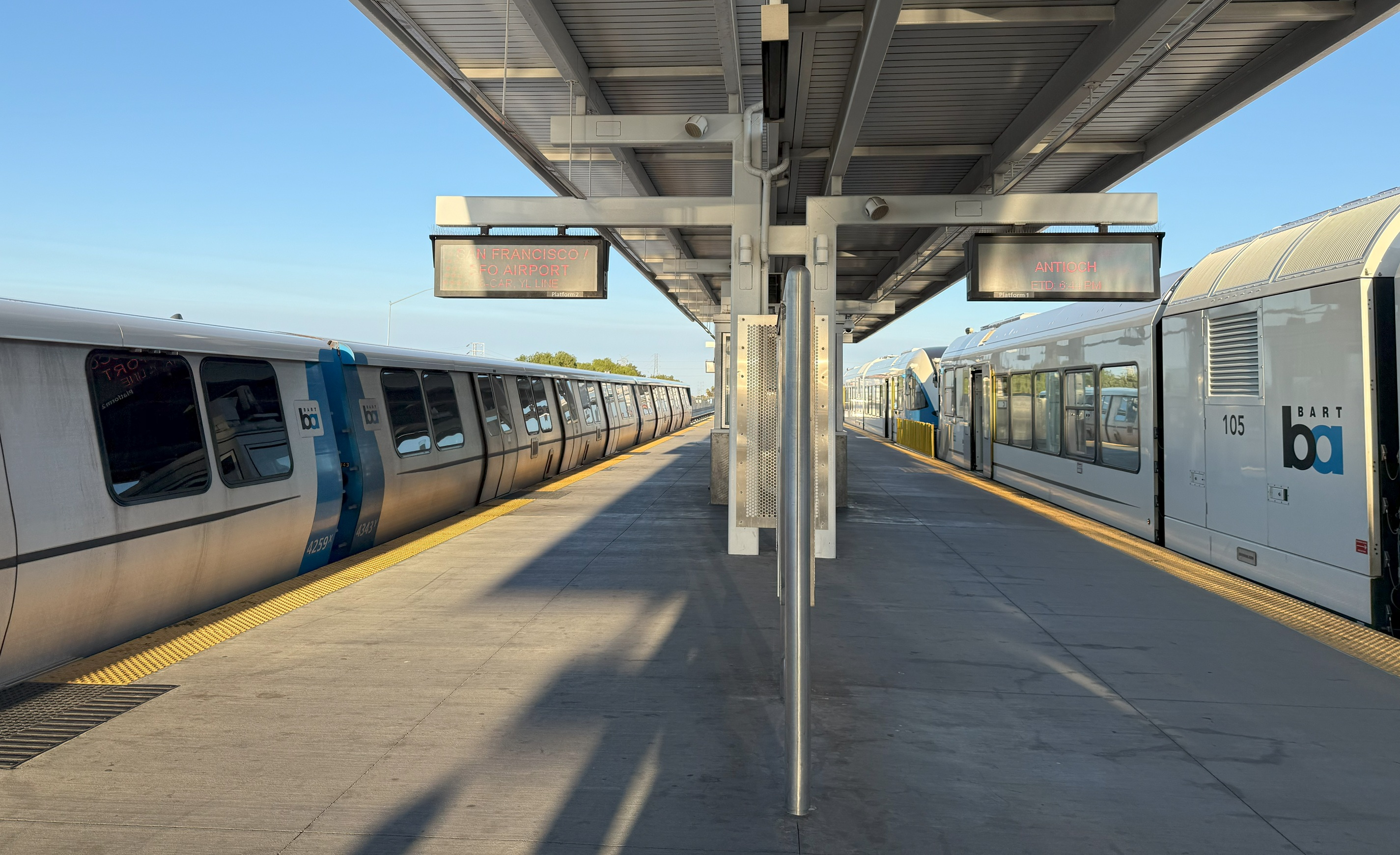
BART and eBART trains at the Pittsburg/Bay Point transfer platform

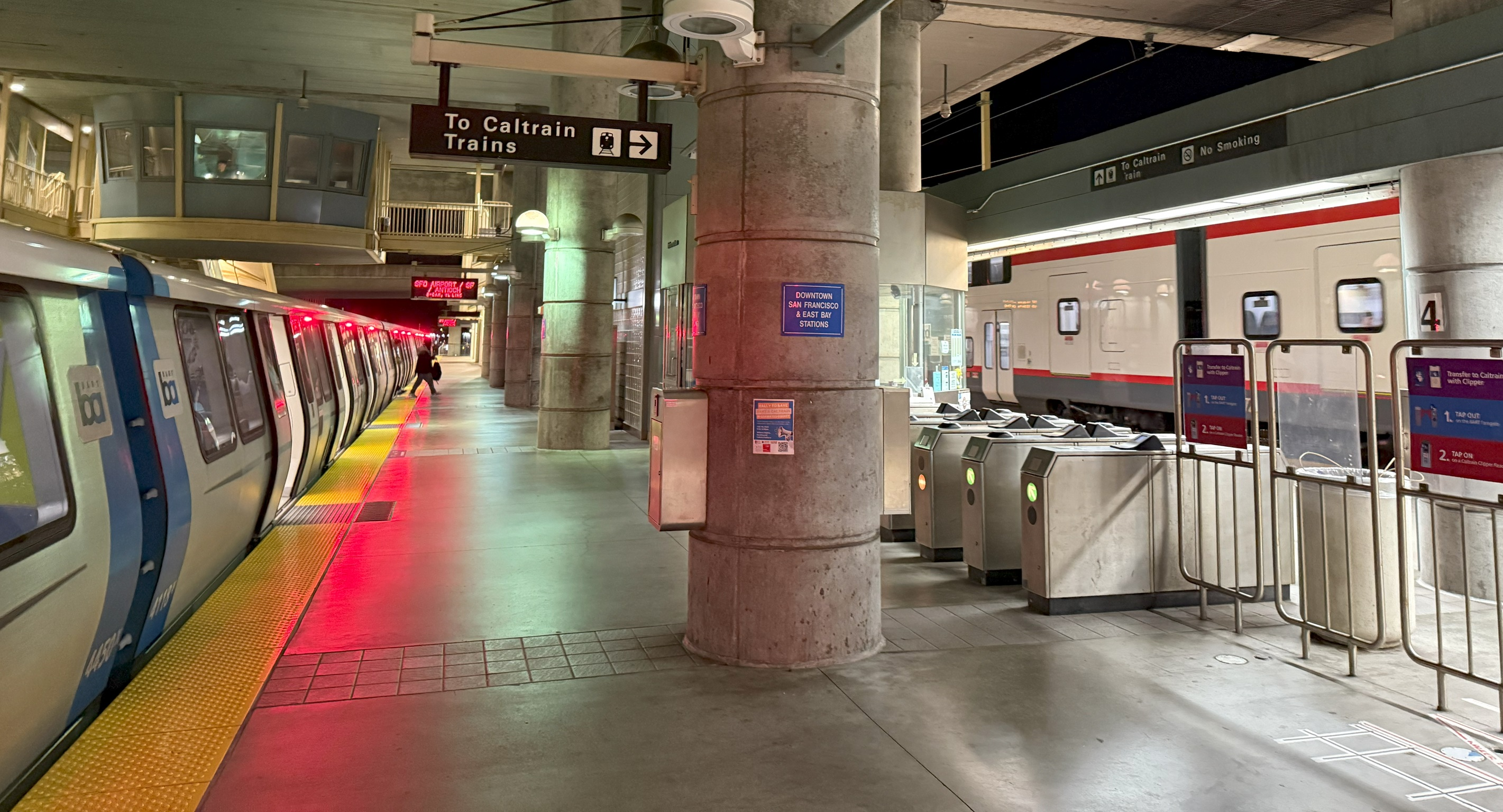
BART and Caltrain at Millbrae

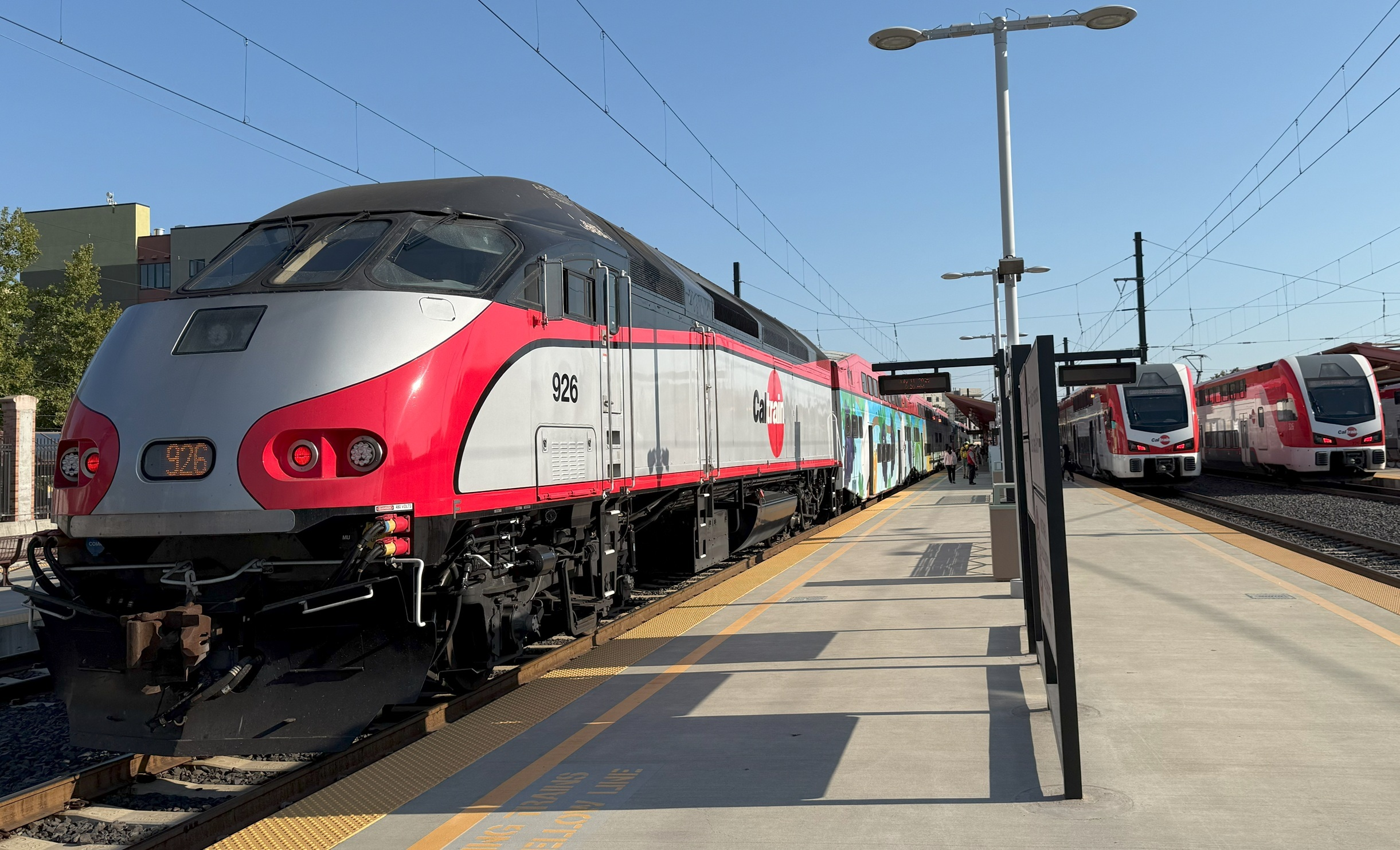
Caltrain South County Connector diesel train and Stadler KISS at San Jose Diridon

San Jose Diridon provides timed cross-platform transfers between electric trains and South County Connector diesel services of Caltrain. Cross-platform transfers also exists at Millbrae between the northbound Caltrain platform and one of the BART platforms and at Santa Clara between northbound Caltrain and Amtrak Capitol Corridor and Altamont Corridor Express (ACE) trains. Baypointe offers timed cross-platform transfers between Blue and Orange trains of the VTA light rail system.

==== Vancouver ====
In December 2016, Lougheed Town Centre station on the Vancouver SkyTrain was expanded to a 3-track, 2-platform station in preparation for the beginning of service on the Evergreen Extension. For the first 18 months of service on the Evergreen Extension, the third platform served eastbound trains while the southern half of the island platform served westbound trains (with Millennium Line trains running left-handed through the station); this measure allowed a same-direction cross-platform transfer between Millennium Line trains headed to VCC–Clark and Expo Line trains headed to Waterfront (via Columbia). On 25 June 2018, normal right-hand running of Millennium Line trains through the station resumed, making it possible to do an anti-directional cross-platform transfer between Expo Line trains headed for Production Way–University and Millennium Line trains headed to Lafarge Lake–Douglas.

=== Oceania ===
==== Auckland ====
At Newmarket Station, there are three lines serving two island platforms. Western Line services use the centre line (which can serve both platforms) allowing cross-platform interchange with Southern Line services which use the outer lines.

==== Adelaide ====
Adelaide Metro offers cross-platform interchanges between the Outer Harbor line and Grange line at Woodville for outbound services only.

==== Brisbane ====
Cross-platform interchanges are offered between Ipswich and Rosewood services at Ipswich, and between outbound express Gold Coast line and stopping Beenleigh line services at Altandi station.

==== Melbourne ====
Melbourne's suburban railway offers cross-platform interchanges along the City Loop according to the operation concept, and depending on time and day. All three underground stations consist of four tracks and two island platforms one above each other.

Burnley Group passengers can change between Flinders Street direct and City Loop services at Richmond station on weekday mornings, and between stopping and limited express services at Burnley station.

Camberwell station operates as a partial cross-platform interchange off-peak, when Alamein services operate as shuttles from Camberwell. During the day, terminating trains from Alamein drop passengers off (before proceeding to a reversing track west of the station) on platform 2, which connects to a city-bound Belgrave/Lilydale line train on platform 1. At night, trains from Alamein terminate and reverse on platform 1, allowing cross-platform transfers for passengers from the city arriving on platform 2 on a Belgrave/Lilydale service.

Selected partial cross-platform interchanges can also be made at Footscray, North Melbourne, South Yarra and Caulfield.

==== Perth ====
The Transperth Trains network offers cross-platform interchanges between the Midland line and the Armadale/Thornlie lines at both McIver and Claisebrook stations, but only when transferring from the Midland line to the Armadale/Thornlie lines. There is no cross-platform interchange in the opposite direction. Bayswater also has cross platform interchange for the Ellenbrook, Airport and Midland Lines, Outbound trains use platforms 3 and 4, and Perth bound trains use platforms 1 and 2 in a dual island configuration

==== Sydney ====
The Sydney Trains suburban railway system offers cross-platform interchange at Central platforms 16–17 and 18–19, allowing passengers to switch between express and local trains to/from Strathfield. Interchanges are also offered at Westmead, Seven Hills and Blacktown along the Western Line. Selected partial cross-platform interchanges can also be made at Cabramatta, Campbelltown, Glenfield, Granville, Hornsby, Lidcombe, Redfern, Regents Park, Revesby, Strathfield and Town Hall.

Cross-platform interchange is also available between Sydney Metro and Sydney Trains services at Chatswood and Sydenham.

=== South America ===
==== Buenos Aires ====
Plaza Miserere provided cross transfer interchange between subway line A and suburban railroad line Sarmiento. There is a never used cross-platform interchange between lines A and D at Plaza de Mayo station and three abandoned cross-platform interchanges: at Primera Junta station between line A and the former tram service towards Lacarra avenue and at San José station on line E between the branch going to Bolívar station and the closed branch to Constitución station where another cross-platform interchange was provided between lines C and E. Suburban lines Sarmiento, San Martín and Roca offers many cross-platform interchanges between express and local services on their 4 track stretches.

==== Santiago de Chile ====
Vicuña Mackenna metro station of Santiago Metro was built to offer cross-platform transfer; the through-running line 4 and its shuttle line 4A were to be interconnected cross-platform. Line 4A would have used the center track between both island platforms, with line 4 stopping on the outer tracks, but the idea was abandoned during construction. Exclusive Line 4A platforms were built on top of the station, leaving the original central track below abandoned. On 2013 the central track was filled, leaving it as the only island platform in the whole network.

==== São Paulo ====
Four stations of São Paulo metro and train network offer cross-platform interchange: Paraíso, between lines 1 (towards Jabaquara) and 2 (towards Vila Madalena), Brás, between lines 10 (towards Rio Grande da Serra) and 11 (towards Luz), Osasco, where line 9 terminates at a center track between two islands platforms serving line 8, and Presidente Altino, also between lines 8 and 9 where the latter uses the inner tracks, the northernmost island platform serves westbound trains (to Itapevi and Osasco), and the southernmost island platform serves eastbound trains (to Júlio Prestes and Grajaú).

At Luz, when "Service 710" is running (through service between lines 7 and 10), cross-platform interchange is also available between alighting-only line 11's trains (which terminates here before relaying) and southbound trains to Rio Grande da Serra. When "Service 710" is not running, cross-platform interchange is done with line 7 southbound trains to Brás, which is also served by line 11 eastbound trains to Estudantes.
