= 2024 in rail transport =

This article lists events related to rail transport that occurred in 2024.

== Events ==
=== January ===
- January 1
  - (Egypt) – Line 3 of the Cairo Metro extends from Kit-Kat to Rod El-Farag Corridor.
  - (Mexico) – Campeche–Palenque section of Tren Maya opens to traffic.
  - (Taiwan) – Circular light rail of the Kaohsiung Metro extends from Heart of Love River to Kaisyuan Park and completes the loop line.
  - – Taiwan Railway Corporation takes over operations of Taiwan Railway from the Taiwan Railways Administration.
  - (United States) – BNSF Railway takes over operations of Montana Rail Link.
- (Thailand) January 7 – Bangkok MRT Pink Line opens between Nonthaburi Civic Center and Min Buri.
- (Poland) January 8 – Line 18 and Line 50 of the Krakow tramway network extend from Papierni Prądnickich to Górka Narodowa.
- (United States) January 13 – Tri-Rail introduces shuttle service between Metrorail Transfer station and MiamiCentral.
- (China) January 15 – Jiangnao Railway starts operations between Jiangjunmiao and Baishihu South Station.
- January 20
  - (Canada) – Metro Line of Edmonton Light Rail Transit extends from the temporary NAIT station to NAIT/Blatchford Market.
  - (Italy) – Rete Ferroviaria Italiana introduces through service between Cirié and Alba and Cirié and Fossano via Line 4 and Line 7 of the Turin Metropolitan Railway Service.
- (China) January 24 – Hubei Xincheng Express Line, a suburban train using the existing Wuhan-Huangzhou Intercity Railway, was put into operation.
- (Latvia) January 25 – Line 3 and Line 5 of the Daugavpils tramway network extend from Butlerova iela to Stropu ezers.
- January 27
  - (Turkey) – Line T3 of Tram İzmir opens between Çevre Yolu and Kâtip Çelebi Üniversitesi.
  - (United States) – Phoenix Valley Metro Rail extends from 19th Avenue/Dunlap to Metro Parkway via Northwest Extension Phase II.
- (Turkey) January 29 – Line M11 of the Istanbul Metro extends from Kağıthane to Gayrettepe.
- (China) January 31 – Line S1 of the Wuxi Metro opens between Jiangyin Bund and Nanfangquan via through service on Line 1.

=== February ===
- (China) February 3 – Zhuhai-Zhuhai Airport Intercity Railway second phase opens between Zhuhai Changlong to Zhuhai Airport.
- (Russia) February 17 – Yekaterinburg Tramway Network Line 9 extends to Luchistaya Ulitsa from Ulitsa Musorskogo.
- February 24
  - (Brazil) – Line 1 of the Rio de Janeiro Light Rail extends from Rodoviária to Terminal Intermodal Gentileza.
  - (Turkey) – Line M1 of the İzmir Metro extends from Fahrettin Altay to Şehitlik.
- (Turkey) February 26 – Line T6 of Istanbul Tram opens between Sirkeci and Kazlıçeşme.
- (Mexico) February 29 – Tren Maya extends from Cancún Airport to Playa del Carmen.

=== March ===
- (Turkey) March 4 – Line M1 of the İzmir Metro extends from Şehitlik to Kaymakamlık.
- (Poland) March 5 – Warsaw tramway network extends from Reduta Wolska to Szpital Wolski.
- March 6
  - (India) – Yellow Line of the Agra Metro opens between Mankameshwar Mandir and Taj East Gate.
  - (India) – Delhi–Meerut Regional Rapid Transit System extends from Duhai Depot to Modinagar North.
  - (India) – Line 1 of the Kochi Metro extends from SN Junction to Thrippunithura Terminal.
  - (India) – Kolkata Metro: Green Line extends via disconnected branch from Howrah Maidan to Esplanade, Purple Line extends from Taratala to Majerhat, and Orange Line opens between Kavi Subhash and Hemanta Mukhopadhyay.
  - (India) – Aqua Line of the Pune Metro extends from Ruby Hall Clinic to Ramwadi.
- (Turkey) March 10 – Line M3 of the Istanbul Metro extends from Kirazlı to Bakırköy Sahil.
- (Uzbekistan) March 11 – Circle Line of the Tashkent Metro extends from Quruvchilar to Qipchoq.
- March 16
  - (Iran) – Line 4 of the Tehran Metro extends from Allameh Jafari to Ayatollah Kashani.
  - (Japan) – Hokuriku: Hokuriku Shinkansen extends from Kanazawa to Tsuruga, IR Ishikawa Railway takes over operations of the Hokuriku Main Line between Kanazawa and Daishōji, and Hapi-Line Fukui takes over operations of the Hokuriku Main Line between Daishōji and Tsuruga.
  - (Japan) – E8 Series Shinkansen trains enter service.
  - (Turkey) – Line M5 of the Istanbul Metro extends from Çekmeköy to Samandıra Merkez.
- (Turkey) March 17 – Akçaray extends from Kanalyolu to Şehir Hastanesi.
- (Turkey) March 18 – Line M9 of the Istanbul Metro extends from Bahariye to Ataköy.
- (Turkey) March 19 – Line M11 of the Istanbul Metro extends from Kargo Terminali to Arnavutköy.
- (Japan) March 23 – Kita-Osaka Kyuko Railway extends from Senri-Chūō to Minō-Kayano.
- (Germany) (Czech Republic) March 23 – European Sleeper extends to Prague from Berlin.
- (Philippines) March 27 – PNR Metro Commuter Line ends service.
- March 28
  - (China) – Line 6 of Changchun Rail Transit opens between Shuangfeng and Changchun Movie Wonderland.
  - (Turkey) – Line M1 of Bursaray extends from Emek to Geçit-Balat.
- (Ukraine) March 29 – New line of the Dnipro City Express opens between Dnipro and Synelnykove.
- (South Korea) March 30 – Line A of the Great Train eXpress opens between Suseo and Dongtan.
- (China) March 31 – Line 5 of the Nanjing Metro opens between Jiyindadao and Wenjinglu.

=== April ===
- (China) April 1 – Branch of Line 1 of the Shaoxing Metro opens between Huangjiu Town and Daqingsi.
- (Greece) April 3 – Hellenic Railways reintroduces service between Athens and Thessaloniki.
- April 5 – Line T3b of the Île-de-France tramways extends from Marguerite Long to Porte Dauphine.
- (Qatar) April 8 – Lusail Tram Pink Line opens between Legtaifiya and Seef Lusail-North.
- (Italy) (Croatia) April 24 – Slovenian Railways start passenger services between Villa Opicina and Rijeka.
- (China) April 26 – Line 6 of the Qingdao Metro opens between Lingshan Bay and Hengyunshan Road.
- (United States) April 27 – 2 Line of Link light rail opens between South Bellevue and Redmond Technology.
- (Turkey) April 29 – Mesopotamian Express launches between Ankara and Diyarbakır.
- (Slovenia) (Austria) April 30 – Slovenian Railways: New services connect Ljubljana with Pragersko, Maribor, Graz and Villach.

=== May ===
- (China) May 1 – Line 4 of the Hefei Metro extends via branch from Beiyanhu to Shaomaigang.
- (France) May 6 – RER E of the Réseau Express Régional extends from Haussmann–Saint-Lazare to Nanterre–La Folie.
- May 10 – Translink (Northern Ireland) closes Belfast Great Victoria Street railway station.
- (Egypt) May 15 – Line 3 of the Cairo Metro extends from Kit-Kat to Cairo University.
- (Norway) May 20 – Services restart between Oslo and Trondheim after reopening of the mainline.
- (United States) May 21 – Amtrak introduces Borealis daily service between Chicago and St. Paul by extending one Hiawatha round-trip.
- (Spain) May 21 – Talgo AVRIL trains enter service on the AVE network.
- (China) May 26 – Pearl River Delta: Foshan–Dongguan intercity railway opens and the southern ring section of the Guangzhou–Foshan circular intercity railway opens.
- (United Kingdom) May 29 – ScotRail reopens Leven-Edinburgh service.

=== June ===
- (Australia) June 3 – Pakenham line of the Melbourne rail network extends from Pakenham to East Pakenham.
- (Germany) June 9 – DB Regio Franconia-Thuringia Express expands to Nuremberg.
- (France) June 13 – Line 11 of the Paris Métro extends from Mairie des Lilas to Rosny–Bois-Perrier.
- (Azerbaijan) June 14 – Rail service on the Baku –Agstafa route was significantly enhanced in June 2024 with the introduction of new, modern Stadler trains.
- June 14 – Tanzania Standard Gauge Railway opens for passenger service between Dar es Salaam and Morogoro.
- (United Kingdom) June 16 – Blackpool Tramway extends to Blackpool North railway station.
- (Spain) June 19 – Line T1 of MetroCentro extends from San Bernardo to Eduardo Dato.
- (Denmark) June 22 – M4 of the Copenhagen Metro extends from Copenhagen Central to Copenhagen South.
- (Singapore) June 23 – Thomson–East Coast Line of Mass Rapid Transit extends from Gardens by the Bay to Bayshore.
- (France) June 24 – Line 14 of the Paris Métro extends from Mairie de Saint-Ouen to Saint-Denis–Pleyel and from Olympiades to Aéroport d'Orly.
- June 28
  - (China) – Line 1 of the Changsha Metro extends from Kaifu District Government to Jinpenqiu.
  - (China) – Line 5 of Ningbo Rail Transit extends from Xingzhuang Road to Luotuo Bridge.
  - (Portugal) – Line D of the Porto Metro extends from Santo Ovídio to Vila d'Este.
- (China) June 29 – Line 6 of Suzhou Metro opens between Suzhou Xinqu Railway Station and Sangtiandao.
- (Taiwan) June 30 – Red Line of the Kaohsiung Metro extends from Kaohsiung Medical University Gangshan Hospital to Gangshan.

=== July ===
- July 1
  - (China) – Line 1 of the Tianjin Metro is extended from Donggulu to Shuangqiaohe.
  - (United States) – Tri-Rail introduces express service between West Palm Beach and MiamiCentral.
- July 7 – Line T1 of the Luxembourg tramway extends from Lycée Bouneweg to Stadion.
- (Australia) July 14 – Yanchep line of Transperth extends from Butler to Yanchep.
- (Italy) July 17 – Line 6 of the Naples Metro reopens between Mostra and Mergellina and extends from Mergellina to Municipio.
- July 21
  - (Netherlands) – Amsterdam tramway network line 25 extends to Uithoorn Centrum from Amstelveen Westwijk.
  - (Thailand) (Laos) – Service between Bangkok and Vientiane starts operation.
- (Italy) July 22 – Catania Metro extends from Nesima to Monte Po.

=== August ===
- August 1 – Tanzania Standard Gauge Railway extends passenger rail service from Morogoro to Dodoma.
- (Vietnam) August 8 – Line 3 of the Hanoi Metro opens between Nhon and Cau Giay.
- (South Korea) August 10 – Line 8 of the Seoul Subway extends from Amsa to Byeollae.
- (United States) August 11 – Caltrain soft launches electrification along the San Francisco Peninsula.
- August 12
  - (China) – Xi'an SkyShuttle opens between Yuhuazhai and Hengye Dadao.
  - (Finland) – Line 13 of the Helsinki tramway network opens between Pasila and Nihti.
  - (United States) – SunRail extends from DeBary to DeLand.
- (India) August 18 – Delhi–Meerut Regional Rapid Transit System extends from Modinagar North to Meerut South.
- (Australia) August 19 – M1 Metro North West & Bankstown Line of the Sydney Metro extends from Chatswood to Sydenham.
- (Algeria) (Tunisia) August 20 – Passenger service between Annaba and Tunis restarts after 30 years of suspension.
- (United States) August 22 – Amtrak truncates Northeast Regional service from Newport News to Newport News Transportation Center.
- (China) August 23 – Line 3 of the Foshan Metro extends from Zhen'an to Zhongshan Park and extends via disconnected branch from Lianhe to Foshan University.
- (France) August 24 – Line D of the Grenoble tramway network extends from Les-Taillées-Universités to Gares.
- (Australia) August 25 – Port Dock line of the Adelaide Metro opens between Adelaide and Port Dock.
- (United States) August 28 – Red Line of MAX Light Rail extends from Beaverton Transit Center to Hillsboro Airport/Fairgrounds.
- (India) August 29 – Western Railway launches passenger service between Mumbai and Goa.
- August 30
  - (United States) – 1 Line of Link light rail extends from Northgate to Lynnwood City Center via the Lynnwood Link extension.
  - (Turkey) Mimar Sinan station of the M9 Line is opened.
- (Mexico) August 31 – El Insurgente commuter rail extends from Lerma to Santa Fe.

=== September ===
- (Switzerland) September 2 – Services restart between Lugano and Zurich after the reopening of the Gotthard Base Tunnel.
- (Russia) September 5 – Sokolnicheskaya Line of the Moscow Metro extends from Novomoskovskaya to Potapovo.
- (China) September 6 – Hangzhou-Wenzhou high speed line is officially inaugurated for service between Hangzhou and Wenzhou.
- (Russia) September 7 – Troitskaya Line of the Moscow Metro opens between Novatorskaya and Tyutchevskaya.
- (Austria) (Italy) September 10 – Nightjet begins service between Vienna and Rome.
- (China) September 10 – Line 8 of Suzhou Metro opens between Xijinqiao and Chefang.
- (Croatia) September 11 – Zabok-Krapina railway is modernised.
- (Mexico) September 13 – Line FA of Tren Interoceánico opens between Coatzacoalcos and Pakal Ná.
- September 14
  - (China) – Meizhouxi to Longchuanxi section of the Longyan-Longchuan high speed railway opens.
  - (United Kingdom) – Great Western Railway restores service between Oxford and Bristol.
- (Italy) September 15 – Frecciarossa launches service between Naples and Gorizia.
- (India) September 16 – Red Line of the Ahmedabad Metro extends from Motera Stadium to Sector-1 and via branch to GIFT City.
- (India) September 19 – North Central Railway launches passenger service between Prayagraj and Katra.
- (Mexico) September 20 – Tren Maya extends from Playa del Carmen to Felipe Carrillo Puerto.
- (United States) September 21 – Caltrain begins full electric service between San Francisco and San Jose.
- September 23
  - (Belgium) – Line 10 of the Brussels tramway network opens between Military Hospital and Churchill.
  - (Russia) – Line 2 of the Moscow tramway network opens between 3rd Vladimirskaya Street and Kursky.
- September 24
  - (Mexico) – Tequila Express resumes operations between Guadalajara and Tequila.
  - (Morocco) – Casablanca Tramway: Line T3 opens between Gare de Casa-Port and Hay El Wahda and Line T4 opens between Parc de la Ligue Arabe and Mohammed Erradi.
- (China) September 26 – Xi'an Metro: Line 5 extends from Matengkong to Yanminghu, Line 6 extends from Xi'anguojiyixuezhongxin to Xi'annanzhan, and Line 10 opens between Jingshangcun and Zhaohuiguangchang.
- September 28
  - (China) – Tianjin Metro: Line 5 extends from Liqizhuangnan to Jinghuadongdao and Jinjing line opens between Jinghuadongdao and Tuanboyixueyuan.
  - (United States) – L Taraval of the Muni Metro resumes service between Wawona and 46th Avenue and Embarcadero.
- September 29
  - (China) – Line S3 of the Chengdu Metro opens between Futian and Ziyang Bei.
  - (China) – Chongqing-Kunming high-speed railway opens between Chongqing West and Yibin East.
  - (India) – Purple Line of the Pune Metro extends from District Court to Swargate.
  - (United States) – Copper Line of the San Diego Trolley opens between Santee and El Cajon Transit Center.

=== October ===
- October 1
  - (China) – Line 7 of the Wuhan Metro extends from Hengdian to Huangpi Square.
  - (China) – Huinong South to Yinchuan section of the Baoyin high-speed railway opens.
- (Mexico) October 6 – Tren Maya extends from Nicolás Bravo-Konhunlich to Chetumal.
- October 7
  - (India) – Line 3 of the Mumbai Metro opens between Aarey Colony and Income Tax Office.
  - (Egypt) – Egyptian National Railways reintroduces service between Al Ismailia and Bir-al-Abd.
- (China) October 11 – Xuancheng–Jixi high-speed railway starts operations between Xuancheng and Jixi County.
- (Italy) October 12 – Line 4 of the Milan Metro extends from San Babila to San Cristoforo.
- October 13 – Translink opens Belfast Grand Central for railway services.
- (Nigeria) October 15 – Lagos RMT Red Line starts operations between Oyingbo and Agbado.
- (Germany) October 18 – Line U5 of the Stuttgart Stadtbahn extends from Leinfelden Bahnhof to Leinfelden Neuer Markt.
- (China) October 21 – Tianjin–Weifang–Yantai high-speed railway starts operations between Weifang North and Yantai South.
- October 29
  - (Turkey) – Adaray opens between Adapazarı and Arifiye .
  - (Poland) – Warsaw tramway network: Line 14 opens between Frodo Ave and Miasteczko Wilanów, Line 16 opens between Spacerowa and Miasteczko Wilanów.

=== November ===
- November 1
  - 2 years after opening the first high-speed railway in Serbia, Novi Sad railway station canopy collapsed, killing 15 people. It had a strong impact on society, bringing Serbian prime minister to resign a few months later.
  - (China) – Guangzhou Metro Line 3 extends to Haibang from Panyu Square.
  - – Macau LRT Seac Pai Van Line starts operations between Union Hospital and Seac Pai Van.
  - (Belarus) – Belarusian Railway starts operations between Minsk and Mazyr.
- (South Korea) November 2 – Korail: The Seohae Line extends from Hongseong to Seohwaseong, and the Peotaik Line extends from Sukseong to Anjung.
- (United States) November 3 – Los Angeles Metro Rail: The C Line is rerouted to the new Aviation/Century station, and the southern section of the K Line between Aviation/Century station and Redondo Beach station opens.
- November 7
  - – Bashteel railway station opens in Cairo, Egypt.
  - (India) – Bangalore Metro Green Line extends to Madavara from Nagasandra.
- November 10
  - (Spain) – The Trambesòs T4 line of the Barcelona Tram is extended from Glòries to Verdaguer in the first phase of its expansion along Avinguda Diagonal.
  - (United States) – Amtrak temporarily combines the Capitol Limited and Silver Star trains into the Floridian train between Chicago and Miami.
- (Brazil) November 12 – line 1 of the Teresina Metro branches off from Boa Esperança to Colorado.
- November 16
  - (Philippines) – LRT Line 1 extends from Baclaran to Dr. Santos as part of the first phase of the Cavite Extension.
  - (China) – Sanya to Ledong Tourist Railway opened from Sanya to Yazhou.
- (Spain) November 18 – Line T1 of Seville's MetroCentro extends from Eduardo Dato to Luis de Morales.
- (China) November 22 – Line 3 of Jinan Metro extends from Tantou to Jichangnan.
- (China) November 26 – Line 3 of Harbin Metro extends from Sports Park to Beima Road, completing the loop.
- November 30
  - (China) – Line 17 of Shanghai Metro is extended from Oriental Land to Xicen.
  - (China) – Line 6 of Zhengzhou Metro is extended from Changzhuang to Qinghua Fuzhong.
  - (Greece) – Thessaloniki Metro starts operations between New Railway Station and Nea Elvetia.
  - (South Korea) – Jungbunaeryuk Line extends to Mungyeong from Chungju.

=== December ===
- December 1
  - (China) – Line 7 of the Suzhou Metro starts operations between Muli and Changlou.
  - (Estonia) – Tallinn Tramway Network Line 2 extends to A-Terminal via the Old City Harbour route.
  - (Saudi Arabia) – Riyadh Metro starts operations, with Line 1, Line 4 and Line 6 open for service.
- (China) December 2 – Macau LRT Hengqin line opens between Lotus and Hengqin.
- (China) December 3 – Line 3 of Xuzhou Metro extends from Gaoxinqu'nan to Yinshan in the south and from Xiadian to Zhenxingdadao in the north.
- December 8
  - (Australia) – Transperth Ellenbrook line opens between Bayswater and Ellenbrook.
  - (China) – Jingmen–Jingzhou high speed railway starts operations.
  - (India) – Ahmedabad Metro Blue Line extends to Thaltej Gam from Thaltej.
- (Singapore) December 10 – North East MRT line is extended to Punggol Coast.
- December 14
  - (Germany) – Deutsche Bahn reopens Frankfurt-Mannheim main line after five months closure.
  - (South Korea) – Daegu Metro Daegyeong Line commences service between Gumi and Gyeongsan.
  - (United Kingdom) – The Northumberland Line reopens between Newcastle and Ashington.
- December 15
  - (China) – Beijing Subway: Line 3 opens between Dongsi Shitiao and Dongbabei, Line 12 opens between Sijiqing Qiao and Dongbabei and Changping line opens between Xitucheng and Jimen Qiao.
  - (Czech Republic) – RegioJet takes over Line S49 between Prague and Roztoky.
  - (Germany) – Line S4 of the Nuremberg S-Bahn is extended from Dombühl to Crailsheim.
  - (Germany) – The Nördlingen–Pleinfeld railway reopens between Gunzenhausen and Wassertrüdingen after service to Nördlingen was suspended in 1985.
  - (Mexico) – Tren Maya extends from Escárcega to Chetumal.
  - (Saudi Arabia) – Riyadh Metro: Line 2 opens between King Saud University and King Fahad Stadium, Line 5 opens between Ministry of Education and National Museum.
  - (Slovakia) (Ukraine) – Bratislava-Kyiv route starts operations.
  - (Spain) – Barcelona-Malaga Iryo high speed service starts operations.
  - (Sweden) – Saltsjöbanan resumes operations on Line 25 and Line 26.
- (France) (Germany) December 16 – Paris-Berlin ICE high speed service commences.
- December 18
  - (Belgium) – The new Mons railway station enters service.
  - (China) – Line 2 of the Qingdao Metro extends from Taishan Road to Sichuan Road (Qingdao Ferry Terminal).
  - (Croatia) – Vinkovci – Vukovar line is electrified between Vinkovci and Vukovar.
- December 19
  - (Belgium) (France) – Ouigo Train Classique conventional service between Brussels-South and Paris Nord enters operation.
  - (China) – Chengdu Metro: Line 27 opens between Shifo and Shuxin Road; Line 8 extends north to Guilong Road and south to Longgang.
  - (Russia) – Aurora train resumes passenger operations between Moscow and Saint Petersburg.
- December 20
  - (Australia) – Parramatta Light Rail starts operations between Westmead and Carlingford, reusing the Carlingford Railway Line.
  - (Romania) – Reşita tram reopens.
  - (South Korea) – Line 1 of the Daegu Metro is extended from Ansim to Hayang.
- (Vietnam) December 22 – Line 1 of the Ho Chi Minh City Metro starts operations between Ben Thanh and Suoi Tien Terminal.
- December 26
  - (China) – Line 8 of the Hefei Metro starts operations from Beicheng Gaotiezhan to Yilijing.
  - (China) – Shanghai–Suzhou–Huzhou high-speed railway starts operations.
  - (China) – Line 8 of the Xi'an Metro starts operations between Shanmenkou and Shengtiyuguan as a loop line.
- December 27
  - (China) – Airport Link Line of Shanghai Suburban Railway starts operations between Hongqiao Airport Terminal 2 to Pudong Airport Terminal 1 & 2.
  - (China) – Line 11 of the Wuhan Metro is extended from Wuhandong Railway Station to Jiang'an Road.
  - (Russia) – Line 4 of the Saint Petersburg Metro extended from Spasskaya to Gorny Institut.
- December 28
  - (China) – Line 11 of the Guangzhou Metro starts operations between Longtan and Chisha as a loop line.
  - (China) – Line S1 of the Guiyang Metro starts operations between Zaojiaoba and Wangchengpo.
  - (China) – Line 7 of the Nanjing Metro opens its central section between Mufuxilu and Yingtiandajie.
  - (China) – Shenzhen Metro: Line 3 extends to Pingdi Liulian from Shuanglong; Line 7 extends to SZU Lihu Campus from Xili Lake; Line 11 extends to Hongling South from Gangxia North; Line 12 extends to Songgang from Waterlands Resort East; Line 13 opens between Hi-Tech Central and Shenzhen Bay Checkpoint.
  - (China) – Line 11 of the Tianjin Metro extended from Dongjiangdao to Shuishanggongyuanxilu.
  - (China) – Huaixing intercity railway opens from Langfang North to Daxing Airport.
  - (China) – Guangqing intercity railway extended from Qingcheng to Feixia.
  - (Russia) – Troitskaya line of the Moscow Metro extended from Tyutchevskaya to Novomoskovskaya.
  - (South Korea) – Line A of the Great Train eXpress opens between Seoul Station and Unjeong Center.
- (China) December 29 – Zhengzhou Metro: Line 7 opens between Dongzhao and Nangangliu. Line 8 opens between Tianjianhu and Lumiao.
- December 30
  - (Belarus) – Line 3 of the Minsk Metro extends from Kavaĺskaja Slabada to Slutski Hastsinets.
  - (China) – Line 3 of the Shenyang Metro starts operations between Nan Liguan and Lida.
  - (China) – Nanzhu high-speed railway starts operation between Nanning East and Yulin North.
- (China) December 31 – Jidayuan high-speed railway opens between Ulanqab and Yuanping West.
