= Line S3 (Chengdu Metro) =

Rapid transit line in Sichuan Province

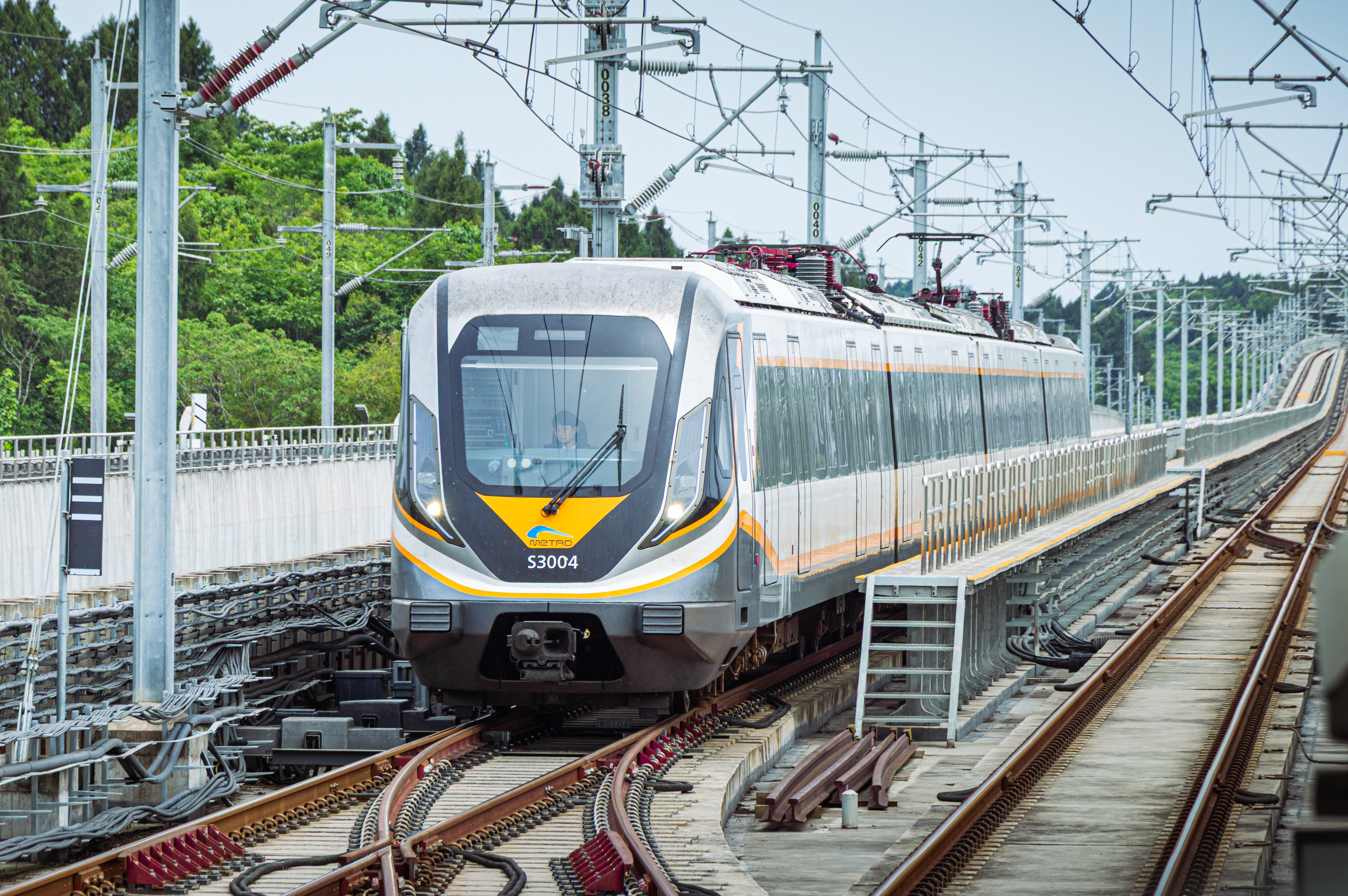
- Line S3 train at Futian station

Overview
- Other name: Ziyang Line
- Status: Operational
- Owner: City of Chengdu
- Locale: Chengdu & Ziyang, Sichuan Province
- Termini: Futian; Ziyang Bei Station
- Stations: 7

Service
- Type: Rapid transit
- System: Chengdu Metro
- Operator: Chengdu Metro Corporation
- Rolling stock: 4-car Type A

History
- Opened: 29 September 2024; 23 months ago

Technical
- Line length: 38.7 km (24.0 mi)
- Number of tracks: 2
- Character: Underground and elevated
- Electrification: Overhead lines, 25 kV AC
- Operating speed: 160 km/h

Line S3 of the Chengdu Metro (simplified Chinese: 成都地铁S3线; traditional Chinese: 成都地鐵S3線), also known as Ziyang Line (Chinese: 资阳线), is a rapid transit line in Sichuan Province, China. The line is 38.7 km long and connects Futian in Chengdu to Ziyang Bei Station in Ziyang; the line opened on 29 September 2024.

== Description ==
The line will use 160 km/h Type-A trains. The investment is 14.93 billion CNY. The line will have both underground and ground level sections. It also passes through Tuo River between 1st Tuo River Bridge and 3rd Tuo River Bridge.

Total investment for the line is 14.93 billion CNY. 40% is paid by Chengdu; relocation fee in Ziyang is paid by Ziyang Government; 54.1% left is mortgage from bank.

- On 27 November 2020, construction officially started for Line S3.
- On 10 March 2023, Line S3 finished all tunnel and bridge work, entering electric work stage.
- On 31 May 2023, Line S3 (Ziyang Line) started mechanical and electrical work, after competing line construction.

== Stations ==
Station No.	Station name		Transfer	Distance (km)		Location
Station No.	English	Chinese	Transfer	Distance (km)		Location
S301	Futian	福田	18 19	0		Jianyang, Chengdu
S302	Lujia	芦葭				Jianyang, Chengdu
S303	Ziyang Airport Economic Zone	资阳临空				Yanjiang, Ziyang
S304	Xingfu Avenue	幸福大道				Yanjiang, Ziyang
S305	Changhong Square	苌弘广场				Yanjiang, Ziyang
S306	Baotai	宝台				Yanjiang, Ziyang
S307	Ziyang Bei Station	资阳北站	Ziyangbei		38.7	Yanjiang, Ziyang

== Operation ==
Operation Model
Operation Phase	Train Type	Cabin number	Operation Speed (km/h)	Frequency (Trains/Hour)	Interval (Mins)	Capacity (Riders/Hour)
Opening Phase	A	4	160	6	12	4500
Short-term	A	4	160	12	5	8900
Long-term	A	4	160	15	4	11100

The line uses Type-A trains operating at 160 km/h speed and powered by 25kV AC overhead lines.

The whole line will use 4-car Trains in the opening and foreseeable future, with 11 trains (44 cars) planning to be purchased.
