= Futian station (Chengdu Metro) =

Chengdu Metro Station

Futian 福田
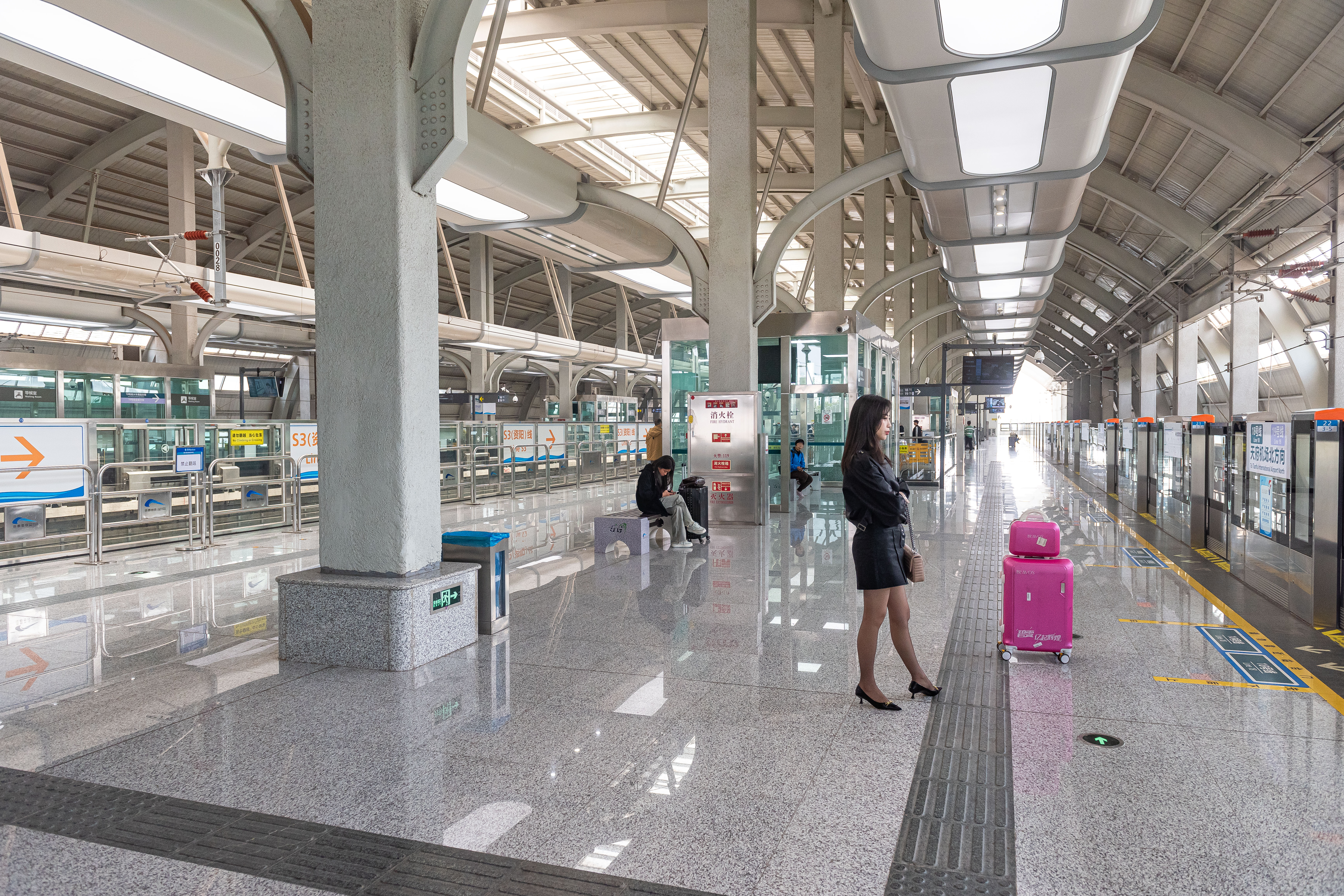

General information
- Location: Jianyang, Chengdu, Sichuan; China
- Operated by: Chengdu Metro Limited
- Line(s): Line 18; Line S3
- Platforms: 4 (2 island platforms)

Other information
- Station code: 1814 S301

History
- Opened: 13 August 2023 (Line 18); 29 September 2024 (Line S3)

Services
Preceding station	Chengdu Metro	Following station
Sancha towards South Railway Station	Line 18	Terminal 1&2 of Tianfu International Airport towards Tianfu International Airport North
Terminus	Line S3	Ziyang Airport Economic Zone towards Ziyang Bei Station

Futian (Chinese: 福田) is a station on Line 18 and Line S3 (Ziyang Line) of the Chengdu Metro in China.
