= List of fatal crowd crushes =

This is a list of crowd collapses and crushes in which at least five people died. The deadliest modern crowd crush incidents have both occurred during the Hajj pilgrimage, with the 1990 Mecca tunnel tragedy claiming 1,426 lives and the 2015 Mina stampede claiming 2,400. (Although the term "stampede" is used in some media outlets, the scientific consensus is that true stampedes involving humans are extremely rare.)

== Ancient era ==
- In AD 80, the Roman-Jewish historian Josephus recorded that in Jerusalem, while Ventidius Cumanus was procurator of Judea (AD 48–52), a Roman soldier mooned Jewish pilgrims at the Jewish Temple in Jerusalem who had gathered for Passover, and "spake such words as you might expect upon such a posture", causing a riot in which youths threw stones at the soldiers, who then called in reinforcements. The pilgrims panicked, and the ensuing stampede reportedly resulted in the deaths of thousands of Jews. According to Josephus, "upwards of ten thousand" and more than twenty thousand people perished in the event, though these numbers may have been exaggerated.

== 18th century ==
- 11 October 1711: 245 people were killed in a crush on the Guillotière bridge in Lyon, France, when a large crowd returning from a festival on the other side of the Rhône became trapped against an obstruction in the middle of the bridge caused by a collision between a carriage and a cart.
- 30 May 1770: At least 133 people died when a fireworks display at what is now the Place de la Concorde in Paris, a celebration of the wedding of the future Louis XVI and Marie Antoinette, set mannequins and other decorations aflame, leading to a panic in which many were trampled and others drowned in the adjacent Seine. Some historians have put the total death toll up to 3,000.

== 19th century ==
| Est. deaths | Date | Name | Country | Place | Description |
|---|---|---|---|---|---|
| 27–34+ | 23 February 1807 | 1807 Newgate disaster | United Kingdom | Newgate Prison, London | Dozens of spectators were crushed to death when part of a crowd of around 40,000 witnessing an execution surged forward after a wooden cart collapsed. |
| 110 | 12 February 1823 | Carnival tragedy of 1823 | Malta | Valletta | About 110 boys died in a crush while attempting to leave the Convent of the Minori Osservanti during Carnival celebrations. |
| 65 | 19 February 1849 | Theatre Royal disaster | United Kingdom | Glasgow, Scotland | Crush occurred at the Theatre Royal, Dunlop Street, when audience members rushed to escape the building during a fire. |
| 43 | 20 November 1851 | Ninth Ward School disaster | United States | New York City, New York | Students suffocated after a staircase bannister failed while they were fleeing a possible fire, causing them to pile up at the bottom of the staircase. |
| 20 | 16 January 1865 | Unnamed | United Kingdom | Dundee, Scotland | A crush occurred during admissions into Bell Street Hall for an upcoming promenade. The main entrance for the music hall was a downward flight of stairs with a set of inward opening gates. When the gates were opened, the force of the crowd pushed those in front down the areaway, which caused a pile-up that ultimately killed 20 people, three-quarters being between the ages of 12 and 18. |
| 19 | 10 October 1872 | Unnamed | Germany | Ostrowo (now in Poland) | 19 women and children were killed in a crowd crush and resulting stairs collapse in a synagogue during the fast of Yom Kippur. A failure of the gas lighting plunged a synagogue balcony (apparently, the women's gallery) into darkness, causing panic among the women. |
| 278 | 5 December 1876 | Brooklyn Theatre fire | United States | Brooklyn, New York | Crushes on gallery and balcony staircases during the fire delayed the evacuation of the building, a contributing factor in the reported deaths. |
| 12 | 30 May 1883 | Brooklyn Bridge stampede | United States | New York City, New York | Dozens of others injured after a woman tripped on the stairway of the Brooklyn Bridge, which had been open for eight days at the time. The crush was exacerbated by fears the bridge was about to collapse. |
| 183 | 16 June 1883 | Victoria Hall disaster | United Kingdom | Sunderland, England | 183 children aged between 3 and 14 were crushed when over 1,100 children surged down a blocked stairway to collect gifts from the entertainers after the end of a variety show. |
| 40 | 14 October 1883 | Unnamed | Russia | Ziwonka, Podolia (now in Ukraine) | False shouts of fire in the women's gallery in the synagogue caused a crush as people rushed towards the exit. |
| 183 | 5 September 1887 | Exeter Theatre Royal fire | United Kingdom | Exeter, England | Deaths due to inadequate and obstructed fire-escapes. |
| 26 | 27 December 1895 | Front Street Theater disaster | United States | Baltimore, Maryland | A panic created by a flame from a match or torch brought too close to a leaking gas pipe caused a crush as people rushed towards the exit. |
| 1,389 | 18 May 1896 | Khodynka Tragedy | Russia | Khodynka Field, Moscow | Crush of those desiring to get presents during the coronation of Tsar Nicholas II – 1,300 more were injured. |

== 20th century ==
| Est. deaths | Date | Name | Country | Place | Description |
|---|---|---|---|---|---|
| 115 | 19 September 1902 | Shiloh Baptist Church stampede | United States | Birmingham, Alabama | Crush following a false fire alarm at a convention featuring Booker T. Washington. |
| 602 | 30 December 1903 | Iroquois Theatre fire | United States | Chicago, Illinois | Most deaths caused by crush asphyxiation in the rush to escape. |
| 16 | 11 January 1908 | Barnsley Public Hall disaster | United Kingdom | Barnsley, England | Children attempting to view a show were crushed on the stairs when the hall became overcrowded, resulting in the deaths of 16 children. |
| 175 | 4 March 1908 | Collinwood school fire | United States | Collinwood, Ohio | One rescue worker, two teachers, and 172 children between the ages of five and fifteen were killed. Most of the children were killed in a stairwell while trying to escape down the stairs while others, who had found escape impossible that way, were trying to flee up the stairs. |
| 73 | 24 December 1913 | Italian Hall disaster | United States | Calumet, Michigan | The event is considered the source for the often-cited legal limit of protected speech, i.e., that one may not falsely shout "Fire!" in a crowded theater. |
| 60–70 | 11 March 1918 | Bolivar crowd crush | France | Paris | Following a bomb attack during World War I, Parisians tried to enter the Bolivar metro station, but the gates down the stairs only opened to the outside. The first rows of the crowd were crushed or suffocated by those behind them. |
| 71 | 31 December 1929 | Glen Cinema disaster | United Kingdom | Paisley, Scotland | Caused by a smoking film canister. The resulting panic and crush initially killed 69 children and injured 40; two others later succumbed. |
| 76 | 8 January 1934 | Kyoto Railroad Station tragedy | Japan | Kyoto | A crowd of about 10,000 saying farewell to 750 recruits of the Imperial Japanese Navy collapsed at the bottom of a stairway from a viaduct leading over the tracks down to the platform. The number far exceeded the station's capacity. |
| 461 | 5 June 1941 | Chongqing tunnel massacre | China | Chongqing | Thousands rushed to the Shiba Ti Tunnel air raid shelter during the Japanese Bombing of Chongqing in the Second Sino-Japanese War but were locked outside. Crowding and lack of oxygen caused a fatal crush. |
| 354 | 23 October 1942 | Tragedy of the Gallery of Graces | Italy | Genoa | Crowd crush during an attack by the RAF Bomber Command in World War II as they made their way into Galleria delle Grazie, a railway tunnel used as an air raid shelter. Rushing down the 150 steps leading underground into the shelter, people fell on top of one another. |
| 173 | 3 March 1943 | Bethnal Green tube station disaster | United Kingdom | London | People were entering the station during an air-raid alert during World War II, and a woman holding a child lost her footing and fell down the stairs, leading to the crowd falling around her in a crush. |
| 168 | 6 July 1944 | Hartford circus fire | United States | Hartford, Connecticut | A fire broke out at a performance of the Ringling Brothers and Barnum & Bailey Circus. Many died after being trampled by other spectators, with some asphyxiating underneath the piles of people who fell over each other. Most dead were found in piles, some three bodies deep, at the most congested exits. A small number of people were found alive at the bottoms of these piles, protected by the bodies on top of them when the burning big top ultimately fell down. |
| 33 | 9 March 1946 | Burnden Park disaster | United Kingdom | Bolton, England | At an FA Cup Quarter-final between Bolton Wanderers and Stoke City, the collapse of two crash barriers in an overcrowded stand led to the crowd falling forward upon each other. |
| 53 | 9 April 1952 | Santa Teresa Church tragedy | Venezuela | Caracas | Occurred when someone shouted "Fire!" in the Basilica of St. Teresa. 40 people were arrested in connection with the crush. Two men arrested on the day of the crush were released. The panic started when an elderly devotee brushed against the veil which held candles in the head, making a small fire that alarmed those affected by the panic. |
| 109 | 9 March 1953 | Stalin funeral crush | Soviet Union | Moscow | A crush in Trubnaya Square during the state funeral of Joseph Stalin. |
| 500–800 | 3 February 1954 | 1954 Prayag Kumbh Mela stampede | India | Prayagraj, Uttar Pradesh | A surging crowd broke through the barriers separating them from a procession of sadhus and holy men of various akharas, resulting in a crush. |
| 124 | 1 January 1956 | Yahiko Shrine Stampede | Japan | Yahiko, Niigata | New Year panic and crush at the Yahiko Shrine. |
| 67 | 17 June 1959 | Busan Stadium crush | South Korea | Busan | Heavy rain forced spectators to rush towards the upper sections of the municipal stadium, leading to the crush. |
| 31 | 26 January 1960 | Seoul Station crush | South Korea | Seoul | Occurred two days before the Lunar New Year when many people were returning to their hometowns. About 3,900 people, more than three times the average crowd, flocked to the ticket gate, where 200 tickets were sold for a train with a capacity of 80 people. |
| 328 | 24 May 1964 | Estadio Nacional disaster | Peru | Lima | Fans disputing a referee's decision during a match between Peru and Argentina began a pitch invasion, with police firing tear gas canisters into one grandstand to prevent more fans from invading the field, causing panic so that departing spectators moved down the enclosed stairways, pressing those in the lead against solid corrugated steel shutters at the bottom of tunnels, which were closed. The shutters finally burst outward from pressure of the crush of bodies inside. All deaths occurred in the jammed stairwells, mostly from internal haemorrhaging by crushing pressure, or by asphyxia. An additional 500 people were injured, many critically. |
| 71 | 23 June 1968 | The Tragedy of Gate 12 | Argentina | Buenos Aires | Fans were caught in a crush at the bottom of the stairs leaving through Gate 12 (Puerta 12 in Spanish) of El Monumental Stadium after a derby between River Plate and Boca Juniors. The exact cause of this crush is uncertain, though rival fans may have thrown burning paper, causing a panic. Other accounts say that the gate was closed by police or other fans, intentionally or unintentionally. Still others argue that it was a simple matter of too many fans going through a gate that was narrower than the staircase leading to it. The disaster remains the deadliest sports-related event in Argentine history. |
| 43 | 17 September 1968 | Kayseri Atatürk Stadium disaster | Turkey | Kayseri | Crush at a football match between Kayserispor and Sivasspor, which injured hundreds more. It was the worst instance of sports-related violence in Turkey. |
| 66 | 2 January 1971 | 1971 Ibrox disaster | United Kingdom | Glasgow, Scotland | Stairway barriers collapsed after someone fell as fans were leaving the Ibrox Stadium following a match between Rangers and Celtic, leading to a crush. Many children also died in the disaster, and most deaths were caused by compressive asphyxia, with bodies being stacked up to six feet deep. More than 200 others were injured. |
| 21 | 10 March 1975 | Sokolniki disaster | Soviet Union | Moscow | Crush after a friendly hockey match at the Sokolniki Sports Palace between the Soviet junior national team and the Canadian junior team Barrie Co-op. 25 others were wounded. |
| 694 | 18 February 1977 | Xinjiang 61st Regiment Farm fire | China | Khorgos, Xinjiang | Crush at the exit of a hall. A child set off a New Year firecracker that ignited the mourning wreaths of Mao Zedong on display in the hall. |
| 11 | 3 December 1979 | The Who concert disaster | United States | Cincinnati, Ohio | Crush at a concert by The Who at the Riverfront Coliseum. The incident led to a reduced use of festival seating at U.S. venues. |
| 7 | 9 July 1980 | Unnamed | Brazil | Fortaleza, Ceará | On the 10th day of Pope John Paul II's visit to Brazil, in an effort to get good seats, the crowd at the Castelao Stadium broke down an unguarded gate and trampled those killed in the rush. |
| 21 | 8 February 1981 | Karaiskakis Stadium disaster | Greece | Piraeus | While fans were exiting the stadium after a match between Olympiacos and AEK Athens, some lost their balance and fell on the last steps; soon dozens fell onto each other and were stepped over by a horde of unsuspecting fans who kept coming. 19 people died at the scene, while two more died of their wounds in hospital. At least 55 were wounded. |
| 66 | 20 October 1982 | Luzhniki disaster | Soviet Union | Moscow | A crush began at a UEFA Cup match between FC Spartak Moscow and HFC Haarlem at Luzhniki Stadium after a person fell and a dense moving crowd, their direction limited by metal banisters, pushed over the fallen, crushing them. Others stumbled over the bodies in a domino effect creating a large chain-reaction pile-up of people. |
| 19 | 20 November 1982 | Khabarovsk Stadium disaster | Soviet Union | Khabarovsk, Khabarovsk Krai | The crush occurred after a ball hockey match at Lenin Stadium. 49 others were wounded. |
| 39 | 29 May 1985 | Heysel Stadium disaster | Belgium | Brussels | A crush triggered by a wall that collapsed after fans escaping a confrontation between competing fan groups were pressed against it in the stadium before the start of the 1985 European Cup Final between Liverpool and Juventus. 600 were injured, and the disaster was later described as "the darkest hour in the history of the UEFA competitions". |
| 28 | 26 December 1987 | Unnamed | China | Shanyang County, Shaanxi Province | At around 7 a.m., children rushed out of their classrooms at Chengguan Primary School after a bell called all pupils to attend a weekly school assembly on the sports field. One metal door at one end of the building was locked, causing the children from all 18 classes to rush down an unlighted stairwell to the only other exit, and some in the front fell over. |
| 93 | 13 March 1988 | Kathmandu Stadium disaster | Nepal | Kathmandu | Football fans at Dasarath Rangasala Stadium attending a Tribhuvan Challenge Shield match between Janakpur Cigarette Factory and Bangladeshi side Liberation Army surged towards the only cover during a hailstorm. The crowd was beaten back by police, but when they returned to the south terrace, a crush developed in a tunnel exit through the terrace and could not escape because the stadium doors were locked, causing a fatal crush at the front of the crowd. 100 more were injured. |
| 97 | 15 April 1989 | Hillsborough disaster | United Kingdom | Sheffield, England | 97 people died and 766 were injured at Hillsborough Stadium during an FA Cup match between Liverpool and Nottingham Forest. The intensity of the crush broke the barriers on the terraces, while those trapped were packed so tightly in the pens that many victims died of compressive asphyxia while standing. The 1990 official inquiry concluded that the primary cause was the failure of police control, as too many people were let into the stadium. A 2012 reinvestigation concluded that crowd safety was compromised at every level by lack of police control. |
| 8 | 6 June 1989 | Khomeini funeral crush | Iran | Tehran | Crush as millions flocked to the coffin of Ayatollah Khomeini as it was being moved through downtown Tehran, forcing the military to transport the body to Behesht-e Zahra cemetery using a helicopter. |
| 1,426 | 2 July 1990 | 1990 Mecca tunnel tragedy | Saudi Arabia | Mina | A blockage at an exit of a pedestrian tunnel (Al-Ma'aisim tunnel) leading out from Mecca towards Mina and the Plains of Arafat led to deaths by suffocation of many religious pilgrims while they were traveling to perform the Stoning of the Devil ritual during the Hajj. |
| 40 | 13 January 1991 | Orkney Stadium Disaster | South Africa | Orkney | Crush at a football match between Kaizer Chiefs and Orlando Pirates attended by about 30,000 fans in a stadium with a capacity for 23,000. When brawls broke out, people panicked, and trying to escape, were crushed against riot-control fences in the melee. |
| 42 | 13 February 1991 | Unnamed | Mexico | Chalma sanctuary, Mexico State | An additional 55 religious pilgrims were injured after being overwhelmed by a crowd trying to enter the atrium of the sanctuary church to receive the divine signal from the ashes. The crowd pushed on for access to the atrium, with most of the dead and injured being trampled. |
| 105 | 24 September 1991 | 1991 Taiyuan Illumination show crush | China | Jikong Bridge, Taiyuan, Shanxi Province | Large crowds of unknown size arrived in Yingze Park to see lanterns at a light festival. Crowds moving in opposite directions were crossing a poorly lit bridge. Some fell into the water and drowned; others were killed in the crowd collapse and crush on the west side of the bridge. In all, 105 people were killed and 108 more were injured. |
| 9 | 28 December 1991 | City College stampede | United States | New York City, New York | At an oversold charity basketball game featuring rap stars, 29 others were injured while entering an overcrowded gymnasium while funneling through a small stairwell area at the City College of New York. |
| 21 | 1 January 1993 | Lan Kwai Fong Tragedy | Hong Kong | Lan Kwai Fong | 67 others injured as a crowd of 15,000 to 20,000 revelers celebrated New Year's Eve in the city's nightclub district, controlled by 118 police officers. The victims were mostly teenagers and people in their 20s. The Independent reported witnesses as saying it was impossible to distinguish between the yelps of the partying crowd and the victims' agonized screams. |
| 270 | 23 May 1994 | 1994 Hajj stampede | Saudi Arabia | Jamarat Bridge, Mecca | Hajj pilgrims were killed and injured during a crowd crush at the Stoning of the Devil ritual. |
| 113 | 23 November 1994 | 1994 Gowari stampede | India | Nagpur, Maharashtra | Gowari people in a political protest, mostly women and children, perished in a crush triggered by cane-wielding police who attempted to prevent the estimated crowd of 40,000 from pressing towards the Vidan Bhavan. 500 others were injured. |
| 162 | 18 March 1996 | Ozone Disco fire | Philippines | Quezon City | A fire at a nightclub filled beyond capacity led to a crush at the only exit, whose doors opened inward. Many of the bodies were discovered along the corridor leading to the exit, piled up waist-high. |
| 83 | 16 October 1996 | 16 October disaster | Guatemala | Guatemala City | 147 others were injured on the steep stairway of Estadio Mateo Flores prior to a World Cup qualifying match between Guatemala and Costa Rica. The crowd was estimated at 50,000 in the stadium designed to seat 37,500. |
| 118 | 9 April 1998 | 1998 Hajj stampede | Saudi Arabia | Mecca | Hajj pilgrims were trampled to death, 180 more injured in an incident on the Jamarat Bridge. |
| 53 | 14 January 1999 | 1999 Sabarimala stampede | India | Sabarimala shrine, Perunad, Kerala | When a landslide caused a cave-in during a Hindu pilgrimage on the day of Makara Jyothi, panic ensued and 200,000 male devotees panicked as the hill upon which they stood collapsed into the temple. The BBC reported that "Some of the dead were buried in the collapse, but most died in a stampede to avoid the landslide." |
| 53 | 30 May 1999 | Nyamiha stampede | Belarus | Minsk | A sudden thunderstorm caused a number of young people to race for nearby shelter during an open-air concert. The crowd was funneled toward the underpass of the Nyamiha metro station and many were killed when they started slipping on the wet pavement, falling and trampling each other. |
| 6 | 4 December 1999 | "Air & Style" crowd crush | Austria | Innsbruck | "Severe crowd accumulation" at one exit of Bergisel Stadium went unnoticed. Darkness, a steep slope and a slippery surface were contributing factors, but "panic did not occur at any time." Four others were left in a vegetative state, and 38 were injured. |

== 21st century ==
=== 2000s ===
| Est. deaths | Date | Name | Country | Place | Description |
|---|---|---|---|---|---|
| 13 | 24 March 2000 | Throb nightclub disaster | South Africa | Chatsworth | 13 children killed and 100 injured after a panic that broke out after a tear gas canister detonated during a party for 600 children. |
| 9 | 30 June 2000 | Roskilde Festival disaster | Denmark | Roskilde | Occurred as members of the crowd were crushed against the stage during a performance by Pearl Jam. Another 26 people were injured, 3 of them seriously. |
| 12 | 9 July 2000 | Unnamed | Zimbabwe | Harare | Spectators at a World Cup qualifier between Zimbabwe and South Africa died trying to leave the National Sports Stadium after police fired tear gas to control the crowd. |
| 35 | 5 March 2001 | 2001 Hajj stampede | Saudi Arabia | Mina | Hajj pilgrims trampled in a crowd crush during the Stoning of the Devil ritual. |
| 43 | 11 April 2001 | Ellis Park Stadium disaster | South Africa | Johannesburg | Crush during a football match between Kaizer Chiefs and Orlando Pirates |
| 127 | 9 May 2001 | Accra Sports Stadium disaster | Ghana | Accra | Crush at a football match between Kumasi Asante Kotoko and Accra Hearts of Oak after police fired tear gas at rioters. |
| 11 | 21 July 2001 | Akashi crowd crush | Japan | Akashi | 247 others injured by a crowd crush after a fireworks show. |
| 7 | 21 December 2001 | Unnamed | Bulgaria | Sofia | Children aged 10 to 14 killed on the stairway leading to the entrance of a discothèque. |
| 14 | 11 February 2003 | Unnamed | Saudi Arabia | Mina | Occurred during the Stoning of the Devil ritual of the Hajj pilgrimage. |
| 21 | 17 February 2003 | E2 nightclub stampede | United States | Chicago, Illinois | Crush in the stairway exit to the nightclub, after pepper spray was used on an upper-story dance floor. |
| 100 | 20 February 2003 | The Station nightclub fire | United States | West Warwick, Rhode Island | Pyrotechnics used during a show ignited rubber foam used to soundproof the ceiling, setting the entire club ablaze in minutes. The main entrance was only accessible through a narrow hall where most of the crush occurred. |
| 251 | 1 February 2004 | 2004 Hajj stampede | Saudi Arabia | Mina | Occurred at Jamarat Bridge during the Stoning of the Devil ritual of the Hajj. |
| 37 | 5 February 2004 | 2004 Miyun stampede | China | Miyun County, Beijing | 15 others injured in a crowd crush during Lantern Festival in Mihong Park. |
| 21 | 12 April 2004 | Saree Stampede | India | Lucknow, Uttar Pradesh | Women were killed in a crush after people rushed to collect free sarees. |
| 291 | 25 January 2005 | Mandher Devi temple stampede | India | Wai, Maharashtra | Hindu pilgrims surged near Mandhradevi temple. |
| 7 | 25 March 2005 | Unnamed | Iran | Tehran | Crush after Iran-Japan match (2006 FIFA World Cup qualification) when leaving Azadi Stadium. |
| 953 | 31 August 2005 | 2005 Al-Aimmah Bridge disaster | Iraq | Baghdad | Rumors among Shiite pilgrims of a suicide bomber led to mass panic and a crush on the bridge, killing many before it finally collapsed. |
| 42 | 18 December 2005 | 2005 December Chennai stampede | India | Chennai, Tamil Nadu | Crush as flood relief supplies were handed out to homeless refugees. |
| 345 | 12 January 2006 | 2006 Hajj stampede | Saudi Arabia | Mina | Occurred at Jamarat Bridge during the Stoning of the Devil ritual of the Hajj. |
| 78 | 4 February 2006 | PhilSports Arena Stampede | Philippines | Pasig, Metro Manila | Crush at the venue of the first anniversary celebrations of ABS-CBN's variety show Wowowee. |
| 51 | 12 September 2006 | Unnamed | Yemen | Ibb | More than 200 others injured in a crush at a campaign rally. |
| 12 | 2 June 2007 | Unnamed | Zambia | Chililabombwe | Crush at the end of a football game between Zambia and Republic of Congo. |
| 14 | 3 October 2007 | Unnamed | India | Mughalsarai, Uttar Pradesh | Women were crushed to death at a train station. |
| 6 | 5 October 2007 | Unnamed | North Korea | Sunchon | Crush after a crowd of 15,000 watched a public execution in a stadium, 34 others injured. |
| 11 | 9 February 2008 | 2008 Bandung stampede | Indonesia | Bandung | Crush at the launching album concert of the metal band Beside. |
| 9 | 27 March 2008 | Unnamed | India | Ashoknagar, Madhya Pradesh | More than a dozen others injured at a temple crush during a pilgrimage. |
| 12 | 20 June 2008 | New's Divine nightclub tragedy | Mexico | Mexico City | 13 others injured at a nightclub crush during a police raid. |
| 142 | 3 August 2008 | Naina Devi stampede | India | Himachal Pradesh | 47 others injured in a stampede at the Naina Devi temple after a rain shelter collapsed, which worshipers mistakenly took to be a landslide. |
| 11 | 14 September 2008 | Unnamed | Democratic Republic of Congo | Butembo | Rumors of players using witchcraft led to rioting at a football match which was dispersed by police using tear gas, causing the crush. |
| 224 | 30 September 2008 | 2008 Jodhpur stampede | India | Jodhpur, Rajasthan | 425 others injured at the Chamunda Devi temple in a panic caused by a rumor that a bomb was planted in the temple complex. Local authorities, however, blamed steep, slippery slopes leading to the temple. |
| 20 | 2 October 2008 | Unnamed | Tanzania | Tabora | Children died in a crush in an overcrowded children's dance hall. |
| 19 | 29 March 2009 | Houphouët-Boigny Arena stampede | Côte d'Ivoire | Abidjan | 130 others injured as fans tried to squeeze into the stadium for a World Cup qualifier between Côte d'Ivoire and Malawi. |
| 8 | 8 December 2009 | Unnamed | China | Xiangxiang, Hunan Province | Seven boys and one girl aged between 11- and 14-years-old were killed and 26 injured from a crush in Yucai Middle School. 52 evening classes were dismissed at the same time, and the crush occurred when most students tried to exit down the same stairwell. It was raining outside, and that stairwell was closest to the dormitories. |

=== 2010s ===
| Est. deaths | Date | Name | Country | Place | Description |
|---|---|---|---|---|---|
| 71 | 4 March 2010 | Pratapgarh stampede | India | Kunda, Pratapgarh, Uttar Pradesh | Over 200 others injured at Ram Janki Temple in a crush after the gates of the temple collapsed. |
| 21 | 24 July 2010 | Love Parade disaster | Germany | Duisburg | More than 500 others injured during crowd turbulences. |
| 347 | 22 November 2010 | Phnom Penh stampede | Cambodia | Phnom Penh | Crowd crush during a water festival near the Royal Palace. |
| 102 | 15 January 2011 | 2011 Sabarimala crowd crush | India | Pullumedu, Sabarimala, Kerala | 100 others injured by a crowd crush near Sabarimala temple. |
| 12 | 12 February 2011 | Unnamed | Nigeria | Port Harcourt | Crush after a PDP political rally after guards did not open a larger gate, and shot into the air to try to disperse the crowds. |
| 16 | 8 November 2011 | Unnamed | India | Haridwar, Uttarakhand | Crush during a religious ceremony on the banks of the Ganges river. |
| 74 | 1 February 2012 | Port Said Stadium riot | Egypt | Port Said | In the Port Said Stadium, Al Masry fans attacked Al-Ahly fans during an Egyptian Premier League football match, caused a crush that left 200 others injured. |
| 18 | 19 November 2012 | Unnamed | India | Patna, Bihar | Crush occurred during Chhath Puja at the Adalat Ganj area ghat. At least 20 more were also injured, several critically. While it was originally believed that a collapsed bamboo bridge was the cause, later investigations determined that electricity being cut to the ghat was what led to panic. |
| 60 | 1 January 2013 | 2013 Houphouët-Boigny stampede | Côte d'Ivoire | Abidjan | 26 children among those killed, and more than 200 injured at the Stade Félix Houphouët-Boigny during a New Year's fireworks celebration. |
| 10 | 1 January 2013 | Unnamed | Angola | Luanda | 120 others injured as they tried to enter the overcrowded Estádio da Cidadela for a New Year's Eve vigil. |
| 242 | 27 January 2013 | Kiss nightclub fire | Brazil | Santa Maria, Rio Grande do Sul | 168 others injured as a result of a nightclub fire. According to local authorities the fire began on stage after members of the band flared a pyrotechnic device that ignited flammable acoustic foam in the ceiling. Other reasons for the high death toll included the lack of emergency exits and the excessive number of people present. |
| 36 | 10 February 2013 | 2013 Kumbh Mela stampede | India | Prayagraj, Uttar Pradesh | During the Hindu festival of Kumbh Mela, a crowd crush at the train station injured 39 others. |
| 17 | 14 July 2013 | Unnamed | Indonesia | Nabire, Papua | Spectators died escaping the Kota Lama Sport Stadium when a riot broke out after a boxing match. |
| 115 | 13 October 2013 | 2013 Madhya Pradesh stampede | India | Datia district, Madhya Pradesh | During the Hindu festival Navratri, a crush near the Ratangarh Mata Temple injured more than 100 others. |
| 28 | 2 November 2013 | Unnamed | Nigeria | Uke | Shortly after a vigil at the Holy Ghost Adoration Center, 200 others injured in a crush on one of the narrow roads leading out of the town, though the center was over capacity. |
| 14 | 5 January 2014 | Unnamed | China | Xiji County, Ningxia | Crush at the Beida Mosque due to mismanagement of crowds at the commemoration of a late religious figure. |
| 18 | 18 January 2014 | 2014 Mumbai stampede | India | Mumbai, Maharashtra | At least 40 more were injured, when crowds coming to mourn Muslim spiritual leader Syedna Mohammed Burhanuddin became trapped against a gate at his residence. |
| 24 | 15 March 2014 | 2014 Nigeria Immigration Service recruitment tragedy | Nigeria | Various | Up to 24 recruits were killed and more than 119 injured at several stadiums and other venues across Nigeria when 520,000 applicants were invited to take the aptitude test and physical exercises to get one of 4,556 available positions with the Nigerian Immigration Service. As many as one million might have shown up for the event at one of its 37 sites. In many cases, security forces fired their rifles into the air for crowd control, which triggered deadly panics. In at least one location the release of tear gas had the same effect. In several locations there was no effective queuing, and all candidates had to enter the stadium through a single door. |
| 14 | 25 April 2014 | Unnamed | Democratic Republic of Congo | Kikwit | During a memorial concert for singer King Kester Emeneya, power was lost to the stadium and a crush formed at the exit. |
| 15 | 11 May 2014 | 2014 Stade Tata Raphaël disaster | Democratic Republic of Congo | Kinshasa | Crush at a football match between TP Mazembe and Vita Club when police fired a tear gas canister in order to control the crowds. |
| 34 | 29 July 2014 | Unnamed | Guinea | Conakry | Crush at the end of a rap concert after the attendees tried to leave the venue through a small gate. |
| 32 | 3 October 2014 | 2014 Patna stampede | India | Patna, Bihar | 26 others injured in a crowd crush shortly after the Dussehra celebrations at the Gandhi Maidan. |
| 7 | 10 October 2014 | 2014 Multan stampede | Pakistan | Multan district, Punjab | 40 others injured as a result of a crush at Ibn-e-Qasim Bagh Stadium after a speech of Pakistan Tehreek-e-Insaf party chairman, Imran Khan. The latter alleged that only two gates of the venue were opened at the end of the rally and the lights were also switched off, but this was later denied by the DCO and local authorities. |
| 11 | 21 November 2014 | Kwekwe stadium stampede | Zimbabwe | Kwekwe | 40 others injured in a crush during a religious service. |
| 36 | 31 December 2014 | 2014 Shanghai stampede | China | Shanghai | 42 others injured in a crush during New Year's celebrations at The Bund. |
| 28 | 8 February 2015 | 30 June Stadium stampede | Egypt | Cairo | Crush at a football game between Zamalek and ENPPI. |
| 16 | 17 February 2015 | 2015 Haiti Carnival stampede | Haiti | Port-au-Prince | Crush during the Shrove Tuesday festival after a man was electrocuted by high-voltage wires. |
| 23 | 9 July 2015 | Unnamed | Bangladesh | Mymensingh | 50 others injured following a crush at a free clothing drive. |
| 27 | 14 July 2015 | Unnamed | India | Godavari River, Andhra Pradesh | Pilgrims died in a crush on the banks of the Godavari River. The Hindu pilgrims had gathered to take a dip in the river at the start of the Maha Pushkaralu festival. |
| 11 | 10 August 2015 | Unnamed | India | Deoghar, Jharkhand | At least 50 more injured when people rushing the queue crushed those who fell and were asleep at the Baidyanath Temple. |
| 2,400+ | 24 September 2015 | 2015 Mina stampede | Saudi Arabia | Mina | Overcrowding incident during the Hajj pilgrimage. A further 934 were injured. |
| 12 | 25 October 2015 | Unnamed | Afghanistan | Taloqan | Girls aged ten to fifteen were killed and another 42 were injured in a crush on a stairway while trying to escape the school during the 2015 Hindu Kush earthquake. |
| 300 | 2 October 2016 | 2016 Ethiopian protests | Ethiopia | Various | Occurred during the annual thanksgiving festival of the Oromo people after police confronted protesters during the 2016 Ethiopian protests, resulting in a crush. The opposition political party Oromo Federalist Congress claimed the number of people confirmed dead was 678. While the government claimed only tear gas and rubber bullets were fired by security forces on the ground as well as from the helicopter, eyewitnesses claimed and some videos allegedly from the scene showed security forces firing what seem to be live rounds of ammunition. |
| 24 | 15 October 2016 | Unnamed | India | Varanasi, Uttar Pradesh | Occurred near the Rajghat Bridge when many times the expected number of people were heading towards a religious retreat, causing a crush, and later a stampede due to rumors that the bridge had collapsed. |
| 6 | 14 January 2017 | Unnamed | India | Sagar Island, West Bengal | Occurred while pilgrims were trying to board vessels to Kolkata ahead of high tide, after a religious festival on the island. |
| 17 | 10 February 2017 | Unnamed | Angola | Uíge | At least 61 others injured, during a crush in the Estádio 4 de Janeiro ahead of the opening match of the Angolan football season while trying to enter the stadium before a match between Santa Rita de Cássia FC and Recreativo do Libolo. |
| 8 | 6 March 2017 | Unnamed | Zambia | Lusaka | 28 others injured during a crush over food aid from a church group. |
| 40 | 2 June 2017 | Resorts World Manila attack | Philippines | Pasay, Metro Manila | Crush during the evacuation of the Resorts World Manila complex after a gunman opened fire and burned casino gambling equipment. |
| 8 | 6 July 2017 | Unnamed | Malawi | Lilongwe | Seven of the dead were children. At least 40 others injured during a crush at the Bingu National Stadium during the nation's independence day celebrations while trying to enter before a match between Nyasa Big Bullets and Silver Strikers F.C. |
| 8 | 15 July 2017 | Unnamed | Senegal | Dakar | 60 more injured in a crush when a wall collapsed at Demba Diop stadium as police fired tear gas at both sets of fans after a Senegalese League Cup final game between US Ouakam and Stade de Mbour. |
| 22 | 29 September 2017 | Unnamed | India | Mumbai, Maharashtra | Hundreds more injured in a crush following heavy rains in a footbridge between Parel and Elphinstone road stations. |
| 15 | 19 November 2017 | Unnamed | Morocco | Sidi Boulaalam | 15 women were killed and 40 women injured after breaking down barriers during a food-aid distribution. |
| 10 | 18 December 2017 | Unnamed | Bangladesh | Chittagong | At least 50 more injured during a funeral ritual for former mayor A.B.M. Mohiuddin Chowdhury when people tried to rush down a sloped gateway into the Rima Community Center. |
| 10 | 14 May 2018 | Unnamed | Bangladesh | Chittagong | A further 50 were injured in a crush while collecting alms before Ramadan. |
| 19 | 16 June 2018 | El Paraíso stampede | Venezuela | Caracas | Stampede after a tear gas canister was detonated in a crowded club. |
| 6 | 8 December 2018 | Corinaldo stampede | Italy | Corinaldo | Dozens more injured in a crush as concertgoers tried to leave the packed Lanterna Azzurra club after pepper spray was fired inside. |
| 16 | 26 June 2019 | 2019 Antananarivo crush | Madagascar | Antananarivo | 101 more injured in a crush before a concert on the country's 59th Independence Day at the Mahamasina Municipal Stadium. The show was about to start and people believed they could enter the stadium and began to push, but the police left the doors closed. |
| 31 | 10 September 2019 | Karbala stampede | Iraq | Karbala | Pilgrims killed and at least 100 others injured in a crush near a major Shiite shrine while marking Ashura. |
| 9 | 1 December 2019 | Paraisópolis Massacre | Brazil | São Paulo | Crush at a funk music party at Paraisópolis, São Paulo after police entered the venue in pursuit of suspects, causing panic. |

=== 2020s ===
| Est. deaths | Date | Name | Country | Place | Description |
|---|---|---|---|---|---|
| 56 | 7 January 2020 | Qasem Soleimani funeral crush | Iran | Kerman | More than 200 injured. |
| 20 | 1 February 2020 | Unnamed | Tanzania | Moshi | 16 more injured in crush at a church when more than 4,500 attendees were being ushered through an exit so that they could walk on "anointed oil" during a prayer meeting |
| 14 | 4 February 2020 | Unnamed | Kenya | Kakamega | Pupils killed in a staircase crush when they were leaving for the day. |
| 20 | 17 February 2020 | Unnamed | Niger | Diffa | Crush while relief aid was being distributed, mostly to refugees from Nigeria. |
| 13 | 22 August 2020 | Los Olivos stampede | Peru | Lima | Six others injured in the Los Olivos district, when the police raided the Thomas Restobar nightclub to break up an illegal gathering amid the COVID-19 pandemic. |
| 15 | 21 October 2020 | Unnamed | Afghanistan | Jalalabad | Many more injured in a crowd crush at a stadium, after thousands of people gathered to apply for permits to Pakistan when visa applications resumed after a seven-month pause due to the COVID-19 pandemic. Eleven of the dead were women. |
| 45 | 21 March 2021 | 2021 Dar es Salaam stampede | Tanzania | Dar es Salaam | Crush at Uhuru Stadium at the wake of President John Magufuli. |
| 45 | 30 April 2021 | 2021 Meron crowd crush | Israel | Meron | 150 others injured at the annual Meron pilgrimage during Lag BaOmer. Organizers estimated that 100,000 people, the vast majority of whom were Ultra-Orthodox Jews, arrived on the night of 29 April. |
| 10 | 5 November 2021 | Astroworld Festival crowd crush | United States | Houston, Texas | Numerous others injured in a crowd surge at the Astroworld Festival hosted by rapper Travis Scott at NRG Park. 300 people were treated for injuries, and 11 people suffered cardiac arrest. |
| 12 | 1 January 2022 | Vaishno Devi Temple stampede | India | Katra, Jammu and Kashmir | 16 more injured during a crush at a Hindu shrine, triggered by a heavy rush of people coming to celebrate the New Year. |
| 8 | 24 January 2022 | Yaoundé football crush | Cameroon | Yaoundé | Crush at Olembe Stadium to watch a 2021 Africa Cup of Nations football match between Cameroon and Comoros. |
| 31 | 28 May 2022 | Port Harcourt stampede | Nigeria | Port Harcourt | Crush at a charity event at Port Harcourt Polo Club organised by Kings Assembly Pentecostal Church. Hundreds of people who had arrived hoping to receive free food and clothing broke through a fence, causing a panic. |
| 23–93 | 24 June 2022 | 2022 Melilla incident | Spain and Morocco | Barrio Chino border crossing | Crush at the Spanish-Moroccan border resulted in 23 deaths and 70 people missing and presumed dead. |
| 41 | 14 August 2022 | Giza church fire | Egypt | Giza | A fire at the Abu Sefein Church caused panic and a crowd crush. |
| 135 | 1 October 2022 | Kanjuruhan Stadium disaster | Indonesia | Malang, East Java | Football fans were killed while fleeing from tear gas fired inside the stadium after a Super East Java Derby between Arema FC versus Persebaya Surabaya ended in a riot. |
| 159 | 29 October 2022 | Seoul Halloween crowd crush | South Korea | Seoul | Crush at a narrow alley in the Itaewon district during Halloween celebrations; at least 172 more people were injured. In December 2022, the death of one survivor from suicide was ruled by authorities to have been caused by the disaster, legally declaring him the 159th victim. |
| 11 | 30 October 2022 | Unnamed | Democratic Republic of Congo | Kinshasa | Crush at a concert headlined by music star Fally Ipupa at the Stade des Martyrs. |
| 7 | 28 December 2022 | Unnamed | India | Kandukur, Andhra Pradesh | Crush at a political rally as crowds gathered to hear a speech by former Chief Minister N. Chandrababu Naidu. |
| 9 | 1 January 2023 | Unnamed | Uganda | Kampala | Crowds rushing to see a New Year's firework display got stuck in a narrow corridor in a shopping mall. |
| 16 | 23–31 March 2023 | 2023 Pakistan ration distribution stampedes | Pakistan | Various | Crushes as people gathered at distribution centers nationwide to receive charitable aid during Ramadan. |
| 90 | 19 April 2023 | Sanaa crowd crush | Yemen | Sanaa | Armed Houthis fired into the air in an attempt at crowd control during a Ramadan charity distribution event and hit an electrical wire, which exploded and caused panic among those waiting. More than 300 others were injured. |
| 12 | 20 May 2023 | San Salvador crowd crush | El Salvador | San Salvador | During a Primera División football match between Alianza F.C. and C.D. FAS, fans tried to enter Estadio Cuscatlán after the gates had been closed, leading to a crush after they overran the barricades. More than 500 others were injured. |
| 12 | 25 August 2023 | Unnamed | Madagascar | Antananarivo | During the opening of the 11th Indian Ocean Island Games a crush occurred at the Barea Stadium’s C5 gate as people tried to enter the already full stadium resulting in more than 80 other injuries. |
| 32 | 20 November 2023 | 2023 Brazzaville crowd crush | Republic of the Congo | Brazzaville | Army applicants forcibly entered the Michel d'Ornano stadium during a recruitment drive, resulting in a crush that also injured 145. |
| 10 | 22 January 2024 | Unnamed | Cameroon | Yaoundé | Crush as tardy students rushed to enter the gates of the Lycée Bilingue d'Etoug-Ebe. |
| 123 | 2 July 2024 | 2024 Hathras crowd crush | India | Hathras district, Uttar Pradesh | Crush as attendees were leaving at the end of a religious event. At least 150 others were injured. |
| 9 | 27 July 2024 | Unnamed | Democratic Republic of Congo | Kinshasa | Crush at a gospel music concert headlined by Mike Kalambay at the Stade des Martyrs. |
| 7 | 12 August 2024 | Unnamed | India | Jehanabad district, Bihar | Crush believed to have been caused by a clash between a flower vendor and Hindu worshippers at the Baba Siddhnath Temple. At least ten others were injured. |
| 56–150 | 1 December 2024 | 2024 Nzérékoré stampede | Guinea | Nzérékoré | Police tear-gassed football fans who were clashing during a football match, causing the stampede. |
| 35 | 18 December 2024 | Ibadan Christmas funfair crowd crush | Nigeria | Ibadan | Crush at a religious festival held at an Islamic high school attended by around 5,000 youths. Six others were injured. |
| 10 | 21 December 2024 | Unnamed | Nigeria | Maitama | Crush at a pre-dawn charity distribution event held at the Holy Trinity Catholic Church. More than 1,000 people were evacuated. |
| 6 | 8 January 2025 | Unnamed | India | Tirupati, Andhra Pradesh | Crush at a queue for tickets for a religious festival in the Venkateswara Temple, Tirumala. |
| 30+ | 29 January 2025 | 2025 Prayag Kumbh Mela crowd crush | India | Prayagraj, Uttar Pradesh | Crowd surge at the 2025 Prayag Kumbh Mela. |
| 18 | 15 February 2025 | 2025 New Delhi railway station crowd crush | India | New Delhi | Crush at New Delhi railway station. At least ten others were injured. |
| 6 | 3 May 2025 | Unnamed | India | Shirgao, Goa | Crush during a Hindu festival at the Sree Lairai Devi temple. |
| 11 | 4 June 2025 | 2025 Bengaluru crowd crush | India | Bengaluru, Karnataka | Crush during celebrations for Royal Challengers Bengaluru's victory in the Indian Premier League. |
| 29 | 26 June 2025 | 2025 Bangui school stampede | Central African Republic | Bangui | A nearby explosion at an electricity transformer caused a stampede at a high school where around 6,000 students from five different schools where taking the baccalaureate exam. More than 280 were injured. |
| 19–21 | 16 July 2025 | 2025 Gaza Strip aid distribution killings | Palestine | Khan Yunis, Gaza Strip | Crush at an aid distribution centre run by the Gaza Humanitarian Foundation during the Gaza war. |
| 8 | 27 July 2025 | Unnamed | India | Haridwar, Uttarakhand | Crush at the Mansa Devi Temple caused by an electric wire falling on the temple grounds and triggering panic. 28 others were injured. |
| 41 | 27 September 2025 | 2025 Karur crowd crush | India | Karur, Tamil Nadu | Crush at a rally organised by actor-politician Vijay of the Tamilaga Vettri Kazhagam (TVK). |
| 9 | 1 November 2025 | Unnamed | India | Kasibugga, Andhra Pradesh | Crush after more than 15,000 people attended a temple for Ekadashi, far exceeding the maximum 3,000 that the temple planned to support. |
| 6 | 12 November 2025 | Unnamed | Ghana | Accra | Crush at a recruitment drive of the Ghana Armed Forces in El Wak Stadium. |
| 8 | 31 March 2026 | Unnamed | India | Nalanda district, Bihar | Crush in a temple. |
| 30+ | 11 April 2026 | Citadelle Laferrière crowd crush | Haiti | Citadelle Laferrière | Crush during an annual celebration at the entrance to the fortress. |
| 8 | 19 July 2026 | Unnamed | Burundi | Bujumbura | Crush during a religious gathering at the Senior Technical School of Kamenge caused by a collapsed wall. |
| 7 | 17 August 2026 | Unnamed | India | Lakhisarai district, Bihar | Crush at the Ashokdham Temple caused by a fallen electricity pole. |
| 19 | 17 October 2026 | Unnamed | India | Kolkata, West Bengal | Crush at a puja mandal during Kolkata's Durga Puja. |

== See also ==
- List of accidents and disasters by death toll
- List of human stampedes in Hindu temples
