= Ibadan Christmas funfair crowd crush =

Human crush at a fair in Ibadan, Nigeria

- Date: 18 December 2024
- Location: Islamic High School, Bashorun District, Ibadan, Nigeria
- Caused by: Under investigation

Casualties
- Deaths: 35
- Injuries: 6

On 18 December 2024, 35 children died in a crowd crush during a Christmas funfair event in Ibadan, Nigeria. The incident occurred at the Bashorun district's Islamic High School, where thousands of children and family members had gathered for advertised cash handouts and food distributions. Six other children required hospitalization following the disaster.

== Background ==
A Christmas funfair event taking place on 18 December 2024 at the Bashorun district's Islamic High School was organized by local figure Olori Naomi Silekunola, the Women In Need Of Guidance and Support Foundation, and Agidigbo 88.7 FM. The free event, which had been held in previous years, targeted children aged 0-13 years and advertised distributions of 5,000 naira (~US$3.20) to 5,000 children, free food, and event prizes which included scholarships. Offerings of financial assistance were noted to have drawn particular attention due to Nigeria's ongoing economic crisis, which had been characterized as the nation's worst in a generation.

== Tragedy ==
Attendees began arriving at the funfair as early as 5:00 AM, five hours before the scheduled start time. Reports indicated that over 5,000 children assembled at the venue. The fatal crush occurred when the event organizers arrived to commence proceedings, though the exact sequence of events remains under investigation.

Oyo State Governor Seyi Makinde reported that security agents were deployed to the site in order to restore security following the stampede. Medical facilities across Ibadan received multiple victims of the crush. At one hospital, medical staff reported six admissions with only two survivors. Another facility confirmed three fatalities.

== Aftermath ==
Police arrested eight individuals connected to the event, including the primary organizer, Naomi Silekunola, and the school principal. The organizing body of the event, The Women In Need Of Guidance and Support Foundation, faced immediate scrutiny over their role in the tragedy.

President Bola Tinubu ordered a comprehensive investigation, and expressed condolences to affected families. The case was subsequently transferred to the Homicide Section of the State Criminal Investigation Department, and was placed under the direct supervision of the deputy commissioner of police.

Oba Adeyeye Ogunwusi, the Ooni of Ife, issued a statement expressing condolences to affected families, promised to support any community healing and grieving efforts, and offered support to his former wife Olori Naomi Silekunola. He acknowledged her history of organizing similar charitable events in Ile Ife during her time as queen and encouraged that such charitable events continue with improved safety measures.

== See also ==
Crowd crushes primarily involving children:

- Carnival tragedy of 1823
- Victoria Hall disaster
- Barnsley Public Hall disaster
- Collinwood school fire
- Glen Cinema disaster
- 1994 Gowari stampede
- Throb nightclub disaster

Crowd crushes in Nigeria:

- 2014 Nigeria Immigration Service recruitment tragedy
- 2022 Port Harcourt stampede
