= Ilorin Sallah stampede =

2013 crowd crush in Ilorin, Nigeria

The Ilorin Sallah stampede was a crowd crush that occurred at Ilorin, the capital of Kwara State, North-central Nigeria on Eid al-Fitr (Sallah day) at the end of Ramadan in 2013. The crush resulted in the death of 20 people and left several others severely injured. Four people died the first day, and 16 more over the next few days. The incident occurred on 16 October 2013 at Senator Bukola Saraki's house. Saraki is the two-term governor of Kwara State and the former President of the Senate of Nigeria.

== Background ==
Senator Abubakar Bukola Saraki's father, the late Alhaji Abubakar Olusola Saraki, was a philanthropist who often gave food and clothing to the needy, especially at the Eid al-Fitr celebrations at the end of Ramadan. Saraki gave rice, chicken and sometimes money to the widows, the aged, and the poor before his death on November 14, 2012. On every Sallah day, thousands of people would queue at his residence at the Government Reservation Area, Ilorin, Kwara State, to receive the annual gifts.

Following the death of Alhaji Olusola Saraki, his son Bukola Saraki decided to continue this philanthropic act on every Sallah day. This philanthropic act was aimed at providing succour to the needy in Kwara.

== Previous incidents ==
This was not the first time that crush events had occurred at his residence. A similar crush occurred on November 17, 2010, during his campaign for election as a member of the 7th National Assembly, and at least eleven of his campaigners died. On May 27, 2011, during his inauguration ceremony, 25 people were reported dead following distributions of clothing and money to his electoral supporters.

A spokesperson has said that although some in the press had blamed the deaths on the disorderly behaviour of the crowds, efforts would be made to improve the distribution of the gifts. Since then, they have kept to their word.

== See also ==
- Stampede#Human stampedes and crushes
- Crowd collapses and crushes
