= May 11 =

May 11 this year in various calendars
- Monday, 11 May 2026
Akan	Fodwo
Armenian	25 Mareri 1475
Aztec	Ochpaniztli 1, 5 Ātl
Babylonian	23 Nisanu, 2337 SE
Balinese pawukon	Luang, Pepet, Pasah, Sri, Pon, Tungleh, Coma of Gumbreg, Ludra, Urungan, Pati
Bengali	28 Boisakh, BS 1433
Chinese	Yin Wood Rooster・Roof Mansion; Fire Horse Year, Month 3, Day 25 (Lixia, 10 days until Xiaoman)
Common Era	11 May 2026 CE
Coptic	3 Pashons, AM 1742
Egyptian	25 Thoth, 2775 NE
Ethiopian	3 Genbot, 2018 Amätä Məhrät
French Republican	Décade III, Duodi de Floréal de l'Année 234 de la République
Gregorian	11 May, AD 2026
Hebrew	24 Iyar, AM 5786; Omer 39
Hindu	Śatabhiṣaj・Indra; Solar: 28 Vaiśākha, 1948 SE; Lunisolar: Navamī, Kṛishna pakṣa of Vaiśākha, 2083 VE; Rāudra・5127 KY・1,872,706
Icelandic	Mánudagur, 19 Harpa 2026
Islamic	24 Dhu al-Qi'dah, AH 1447 (using tabular method)
ISO week date	2026-W20-1
Japanese	25 Yayoi, Reiwa 8 (Rikka, 10 days until Shōman)
Julian	28 April, AD 2026 (AM 7534)
Julian day	2461172
Korean	25 Yongdal, 4359 DE
Maya	13.0.13.10.9; 2 Zip, 5 Muluc
Roman	ante diem IV Kalendas Maias, MMDCCLXXIX AUC
Solar Hijri	21 Ordibehesht, SH 1405
Tibetan	24 nag pa, me pho rta 2153 or 1772 or 1000

<<	May					>>
Su	Mo	Tu	We	Th	Fr	Sa
					1	2
3	4	5	6	7	8	9
10	11	12	13	14	15	16
17	18	19	20	21	22	23
24	25	26	27	28	29	30
31
2026

May 11 in recent years
2026 (Monday)
2025 (Sunday)
2024 (Saturday)
2023 (Thursday)
2022 (Wednesday)
2021 (Tuesday)
2020 (Monday)
2019 (Saturday)
2018 (Friday)
2017 (Thursday)

May 11 is the 131st day of the year (132nd in leap years) in the Gregorian calendar; 234 days remain until the end of the year.

== Events ==
=== Pre-1600 ===
- 330 – Constantine the Great dedicates the much-expanded and rebuilt city of Byzantium, changing its name to New Rome and declaring it the new capital of the Eastern Roman Empire.
- 868 – A copy of the Diamond Sūtra is published, the earliest dated and printed book known.
- 973 – In the first coronation ceremony ever held for an English monarch, Edgar the Peaceful is crowned King of England, having ruled since 959 AD. His wife, Ælfthryth, is crowned queen, the first recorded coronation for a Queen of England.
- 1068 – Matilda of Flanders, wife of William the Conqueror, is crowned Queen of England.
- 1258 – Louis IX of France and James I of Aragon sign the Treaty of Corbeil, renouncing claims of feudal overlordship in one another's territories and separating the House of Barcelona from the politics of France.
- 1560 – The Ottoman naval forces inflict a defeat on a Spanish fleet in the battle of Djerba. This marks the highpoint of Ottoman naval dominance in the Mediterranean, which starts declining five years later after the failed siege of Malta.

=== 1601–1900 ===
- 1713 – Great Northern War: After losing the Battle of Helsinki to the Russians, the Swedish and Finnish troops burn the entire city, so that it would not remain intact in the hands of the Russians.
- 1812 – Prime Minister Spencer Perceval is assassinated by John Bellingham in the lobby of the British House of Commons.
- 1813 – William Lawson, Gregory Blaxland and William Wentworth discover a route across the Blue Mountains, opening up inland Australia to settlement.
- 1857 – Indian Rebellion of 1857: Indian rebels seize Delhi from the British.
- 1858 – Minnesota becomes the 32nd U.S. state.
- 1878 - Hödel assassination attempt by anarchist Max Hödel targeting the German Kaiser, Wilhelm I.
- 1880 – Seven people are killed in the Mussel Slough Tragedy, a gun battle in California.
- 1889 – An attack upon a U.S. Army paymaster and escort results in the theft of over $28,000 and the award of two Medals of Honor.
- 1894 – Four thousand Pullman Palace Car Company workers go on a wildcat strike.

=== 1901–present ===
- 1919 – Uruguay becomes a signatory to the Buenos Aires copyright treaty.
- 1953 – In the deadliest of a series of tornadoes, an F5 tornado kills 114 in Waco, Texas.
- 1970 – The 1970 Lubbock tornado kills 26 and causes $250 million in damage.
- 1973 – Citing government misconduct, Daniel Ellsberg's charges for his involvement in releasing the Pentagon Papers to The New York Times are dismissed.
- 1973 – Aeroflot Flight 6551 crashes in Semey, Kazakh Soviet Socialist Republic (now Kazakhstan), killing all 63 aboard.
- 1985 – Fifty-six spectators die and more than 200 are injured in the Bradford City stadium fire.
- 1987 – Klaus Barbie goes on trial in Lyon for war crimes committed during World War II.
- 1996 – After the aircraft's departure from Miami, a fire started by improperly handled chemical oxygen generators in the cargo hold of Atlanta-bound ValuJet Airlines Flight 592 causes the Douglas DC-9 to crash in the Florida Everglades, killing all 110 on board.
- 1997 – Deep Blue, a chess-playing supercomputer, defeats Garry Kasparov in the last game of the rematch, becoming the first computer to beat a world-champion chess player in a classic match format.
- 1998 – India conducts three underground atomic tests in Pokhran.
- 2000 – Second Chechen War: Chechen separatists ambush Russian paramilitary forces in the Republic of Ingushetia.
- 2009 – An American soldier in Iraq opens fire on a counseling center at Camp Liberty in Baghdad, killing five other US soldiers and wounding three.
- 2009 – Space Shuttle Atlantis is launched on the final mission to service the Hubble Space Telescope.
- 2010 – David Cameron takes office as Prime Minister of the United Kingdom as the Conservatives and Liberal Democrats form the country's first coalition government since the Second World War.
- 2011 – An earthquake of magnitude 5.1 hits Lorca, Spain.
- 2011 – The Istanbul Convention is signed in Istanbul, Turkey.
- 2013 – Fifty-two people are killed in a bombing in Reyhanlı, Turkey.
- 2014 – Fifteen people are killed and 46 injured in Kinshasa, DRC, in a stampede caused by tear gas being thrown into soccer stands by police officers.
- 2016 – One hundred and ten people are killed in an ISIL bombing in Baghdad.
- 2022 – The Burmese military executes at least 37 villagers during the Mon Taing Pin massacre in Sagaing, Myanmar.
- 2022 – Palestinian-American journalist Shireen Abu Akleh is killed while covering a raid in Jenin. Israel eventually admitted and apologized for the murder, after initial denials.
- 2024 – Start/Middle of the May 2024 Solar Storms, the most powerful set of geomagnetic storms since the 2003 Halloween solar storms.
- 2024 – The 68th edition of the Eurovision Song Contest is held in Malmö, Sweden. Nemo from Switzerland win with their song "The Code", making them the contest's first non-binary winner.

== Births ==
=== Pre-1600 ===
- 1571 – Niwa Nagashige, Japanese daimyō (died 1637)
- 1578 – Sophie Axelsdatter Brahe, Danish noblewoman (died 1646)

=== 1601–1900 ===
- 1715 – Johann Gottfried Bernhard Bach, German organist (died 1739)
- 1752 – Johann Friedrich Blumenbach, German physician, physiologist, and anthropologist (died 1840)
- 1797 – José Mariano Salas, Mexican general and politician (died 1867)
- 1811 – Jean-Jacques Challet-Venel, Swiss politician (died 1893)
- 1811 – Chang and Eng Bunker, Siamese-American showmen, the original conjoined twins (died 1874)
- 1852 – Charles W. Fairbanks, American journalist and politician, 26th United States Vice President (died 1918)
- 1854 – Jack Blackham, Australian cricketer (died 1932)
- 1869 – Archibald Warden, English tennis player (died 1943)
- 1871 – Frank Schlesinger, American astronomer and author (died 1943)
- 1875 – Harriet Quimby, American pilot and screenwriter (died 1912)
- 1881 – Al Cabrera, Spanish-Cuban baseball player and manager (died 1964)
- 1881 – Jan van Gilse, Dutch composer and conductor (died 1944)
- 1881 – Theodore von Kármán, Hungarian-American mathematician, physicist, and engineer (died 1963)
- 1888 – Irving Berlin, Belarusian-American pianist and composer (died 1989)
- 1888 – Willis Augustus Lee, American admiral (died 1945)
- 1889 – Paul Nash, British painter (died 1946)
- 1890 – Willie Applegarth, English-American sprinter (died 1958)
- 1890 – Helge Løvland, Norwegian decathlete (died 1984)
- 1894 – Martha Graham, American dancer and choreographer (died 1991)
- 1895 – Jacques Brugnon, French tennis player (died 1978)
- 1895 – Jiddu Krishnamurti, Indian philosopher and speaker (died 1986)
- 1895 – William Grant Still, American composer and conductor (died 1978)
- 1896 – Josip Štolcer-Slavenski, Croatian composer and academic (died 1955)
- 1897 – Robert E. Gross, American businessman (died 1961)

=== 1901–present ===
- 1901 – Rose Ausländer, poet and author (died 1988)
- 1901 – Gladys Rockmore Davis, American painter (died 1967)
- 1903 – Charlie Gehringer, American baseball player and manager (died 1993)
- 1904 – Salvador Dalí, Spanish artist (died 1989)
- 1905 – Lise de Baissac, Mauritian SOE agent, war hero (died 2004)
- 1905 – Catherine Bauer Wurster, American architect and public housing advocate (died 1964)
- 1907 – Rip Sewell, American baseball player and coach (died 1989)
- 1911 – Phil Silvers, American actor and comedian (died 1985)
- 1912 – Saadat Hasan Manto, Pakistani author and screenwriter (died 1955)
- 1912 – Foster Brooks, American actor and comedian (died 2001)
- 1916 – Camilo José Cela, Spanish author and politician, Nobel Prize laureate (died 2002)
- 1918 – Richard Feynman, American physicist and engineer, Nobel Prize laureate (died 1988)
- 1924 – Antony Hewish, English astronomer and academic, Nobel Prize laureate (died 2021)
- 1925 – Edward J. King, American politician, 66th Governor of Massachusetts (died 2006)
- 1927 – Bernard Fox, British actor (died 2016)
- 1927 – Gene Savoy, American explorer, author, and scholar (died 2007)
- 1928 – Arthur Foulkes, 9th governor-general of the Bahamas
- 1929 – Gerhard Klingenberg, Austrian actor (died 2024)
- 1930 – Edsger W. Dijkstra, Dutch computer scientist and academic (died 2002)
- 1930 – Basil H. Losten, American Ukrainian Greek Catholic hierarch (died 2024)
- 1932 – Valentino Garavani, Italian fashion designer (died 2026)
- 1933 – Louis Farrakhan, American religious leader
- 1934 – Jim Jeffords, American lawyer and politician (died 2014)
- 1934 – Jack Twyman, American basketball player (died 2012)
- 1937 – Ildikó Újlaky-Rejtő, Hungarian Olympic and world champion foil fencer
- 1941 – Eric Burdon, English musician
- 1941 – Ian Redpath, Australian cricketer and coach (died 2024)
- 1943 – Nancy Greene Raine, Canadian skier and politician
- 1945 – Hilda Pérez Carvajal, Venezuelan biologist
- 1947 – Butch Trucks, American drummer (died 2017)
- 1948 – Nirj Deva, British politician
- 1948 – Pam Ferris, Welsh actress
- 1950 – Jeremy Paxman, English journalist and author
- 1950 – Sadashiv Amrapurkar, Indian actor (died 2014)
- 1951 – Ed Stelmach, Canadian farmer and politician, 13th Premier of Alberta
- 1954 – John Gregory, English footballer and manager
- 1955 – James L. Dolan, American businessman
- 1957 – Mike Nesbitt, Northern Irish journalist and politician
- 1958 – Sayuri Kume, Japanese singer-songwriter
- 1963 – Natasha Richardson, English actress (died 2009)
- 1964 – Tim Blake Nelson, American actor
- 1964 – Bobby Witt, American baseball player
- 1967 – Alberto García Aspe, Mexican footballer and manager
- 1969 – Mitch Healey, Australian rugby league player and coach
- 1969 – Simon Vroemen, Dutch runner
- 1970 – Harold Ford Jr., American lawyer and politician
- 1974 – Stanley Gene, Papua New Guinean rugby league player
- 1975 – Francisco Cordero, Dominican baseball player
- 1976 – Kardinal Offishall, Canadian rapper and record producer/executive
- 1977 – Pablo Gabriel García, Uruguayan footballer
- 1977 – Victor Matfield, South African rugby player, coach, and sportscaster
- 1977 – Bobby Roode, Canadian professional wrestler
- 1978 – Laetitia Casta, French model and actress
- 1978 – Judy Ann Santos, Filipino actress
- 1981 – Lauren Jackson, Australian basketball player
- 1981 – JP Karliak, American actor, voice actor and comedian
- 1982 – Cory Monteith, Canadian actor and singer (died 2013)
- 1983 – Matt Leinart, American football player
- 1983 – Steven Sotloff, American-Israeli journalist (died 2014)
- 1983 – Holly Valance, Australian actress, singer and model
- 1984 – Andrés Iniesta, Spanish footballer
- 1985 – Beau Ryan, Australian rugby league player and television host
- 1986 – Abou Diaby, French footballer
- 1986 – Miguel Veloso, Portuguese footballer
- 1987 – Lim Seul-ong, South Korean singer and actor
- 1988 – Jeremy Maclin, American football player
- 1988 – Brad Marchand, Canadian ice hockey player
- 1989 – Giovani dos Santos, Mexican footballer
- 1989 – Cam Newton, American football player
- 1992 – Thibaut Courtois, Belgian footballer
- 1992 – Pablo Sarabia, Spanish footballer
- 1992 – Bryan Rust, American ice hockey player
- 1992 – Bobi, Portuguese Rafeiro do Alentejo, oldest recorded dog (died 2023)
- 1993 – Maurice Harkless, American-Puerto Rican basketball player
- 1993 – Miguel Sanó, Dominican baseball player
- 1994 – Hagos Gebrhiwet, Ethiopian runner
- 1994 – Nene Macdonald, Papua New Guinean rugby league player
- 1995 – Gelson Martins, Portuguese footballer
- 1995 – Sachia Vickery, American tennis player
- 1995 – Shira Haas, Israeli actress
- 1996 – Adin Hill, Canadian ice hockey player
- 1997 – Coi Leray, American rapper and singer
- 1997 – Lana Condor, American actress
- 1998 – Viktória Kužmová, Slovak tennis player
- 1999 – Sabrina Carpenter, American singer and actress
- 2000 – Yūki Tsunoda, Japanese racing driver
- 2000 – Wang Chuqin, Chinese table tennis player
- 2003 – Fermín López, Spanish footballer
- 2006 – Konsta Helenius, Finnish ice hockey player

== Deaths ==
=== Pre-1600 ===
- 912 – Leo VI the Wise, Byzantine Emperor, the second ruler of the Macedonian dynasty (born 866)

=== 1601–1900 ===
- 1610 – Matteo Ricci, Italian priest and mathematician (born 1552)
- 1778 – William Pitt, 1st Earl of Chatham, English politician, Prime Minister of Great Britain (born 1708)
- 1779 – John Hart, American lawyer and politician (born 1711)
- 1812 – Spencer Perceval, English lawyer and politician, Prime Minister of the United Kingdom (born 1762)
- 1848 – Tom Cribb, English boxer (born 1781)
- 1849 – Juliette Récamier, French businesswoman (born 1777)
- 1882 – Frederick Innes, Scottish-Australian politician, 9th Premier of Tasmania (born 1816)
- 1889 – John Cadbury, English businessman and philanthropist, founded the Cadbury Company (born 1801)

=== 1901–present ===
- 1908 – Charles Kingston, Australian politician, 20th Premier of South Australia (born 1850)
- 1916 – Karl Schwarzschild, German astronomer and physicist (born 1873)
- 1918 – George Elmslie, Australian politician, 25th Premier of Victoria (born 1861)
- 1920 – James Colosimo, Italian-American mob boss (born 1878)
- 1920 – William Dean Howells, American novelist, literary critic, and playwright (born 1837)
- 1927 – Juan Gris, Spanish painter and sculptor (born 1887)
- 1929 – Jozef Murgaš, Slovak-American priest, architect, botanist, and painter (born 1864)
- 1938 – George Lyon, Canadian golfer and cricketer (born 1858)
- 1946 – Seán McCaughey, Irish Republican, died on hunger strike (born 1915)
- 1955 – Gilbert Jessop, English cricketer (born 1874)
- 1960 – John D. Rockefeller Jr., American businessman and philanthropist (born 1874)
- 1963 – Herbert Spencer Gasser, American physiologist and academic, Nobel Prize laureate (born 1888)
- 1964 – Janne Mustonen, Finnish politician (born 1901)
- 1967 – James E. Brewton, American painter (born 1930)
- 1979 – Lester Flatt, American singer-songwriter and guitarist (born 1914)
- 1980 – Dyre Vaa, Norwegian sculptor and painter (born 1903)
- 1981 – Odd Hassel, Norwegian chemist and academic, Nobel Prize laureate (born 1897)
- 1981 – Bob Marley, Jamaican singer-songwriter and guitarist (born 1945)
- 1983 – Zenna Henderson, American writer (born 1917)
- 1985 – Chester Gould, American cartoonist, created Dick Tracy (born 1900)
- 1986 – Fritz Pollard, American football player and coach (born 1894)
- 1987 – James Jesus Angleton, CIA counterintelligence leader (born 1917)
- 1988 – Kim Philby, British-Soviet double agent (born 1912)
- 1990 – Stratos Dionysiou, Greek Singer, composer and lyricist (born 1935)
- 1991 – Ulyana Barkova, Russian farm worker (born 1906)
- 1994 – Timothy Carey, American actor, director, and producer (born 1928)
- 2001 – Douglas Adams, English novelist and screenwriter (born 1952)
- 2002 – Renaude Lapointe, Canadian journalist and politician (born 1912)
- 2002 – Bill Peet, American animator and screenwriter (born 1915)
- 2003 – Noel Redding, English bass player (born 1945)
- 2005 – Léo Cadieux, Canadian politician, 17th Canadian Minister of National Defence (born 1908)
- 2005 – Horton Davies, Welsh minister and historian (born 1916)
- 2006 – Floyd Patterson, American boxer and actor (born 1935)
- 2007 – Malietoa Tanumafili II, Samoan ruler (born 1913)
- 2008 – John Rutsey, Canadian drummer (born 1953)
- 2009 – Abel Goumba, Central African physician and politician, Prime Minister of the Central African Republic (born 1926)
- 2009 – Claudio Huepe, Chilean economist and politician, Chilean Minister Secretary-General of Government (born 1939)
- 2009 – Sardarilal Mathradas Nanda, Indian admiral (born 1915)
- 2010 – Doris Eaton Travis, American dancer and vaudevillian (born 1904)
- 2011 – Robert Traylor, American basketball player (born 1977)
- 2019 – Peggy Lipton, American actress, model, and singer (born 1946)
- 2019 – Thomas Silverstein, American murderer (born 1952)
- 2020 – Jerry Stiller, American comedian, actor (born 1927)
- 2021 – Norman Lloyd, American actor, producer and director (born 1914)
- 2024 – Susan Backlinie, American actress and stuntwoman (born 1946)
- 2026 – Brandon Clarke, Canadian-American basketball player (born 1996)

== Holidays and observances ==
- Christian feast day:
  - Anthimus of Rome
  - Gangulphus of Burgundy
  - Blessed John Rochester
  - Ignatius of Laconi
  - Majolus of Cluny
  - Mamertus, the first of the Ice Saints
