= 2019 Antananarivo crush =

Stampede at a concert in Madagascar

Antananarivo stampede disaster
- Date: 26 June 2019
- Location: Antananarivo, Madagascar
- Type: Stampede
- Deaths: 16
- Injuries: 101

The Antananarivo crush occurred on June 26, 2019 in Antananarivo, Madagascar, before a Rossy concert at the Mahamasina Municipal Stadium, celebrating the country's 59th Independence Day. The show was about to start; people believed that they could enter the stadium and began to push, but the police had closed the doors. At least 16 people died and 101 others were injured.

== Previous incident ==
The crush was the second that had happened at the same stadium in the past year, another occurring in September 2018 during a football game between Madagascar and Senegal, which killed one and injured around forty. The game was a qualifying match for the 2019 Africa Cup of Nations.

== Crush ==
Security forces opened the gates at the Mahamasina Municipal Stadium in Antananarivo, Madagascar, on 26 June 2019 to allow spectators to enter, causing the crowd to mass outside the stadium. Police then closed the gates and blocked the crowd, which caused a pile-up. According to National Gendarmerie General Chief Richard Ravalomanana, the crowd thought that the gates had been opened and they tried to force the doors; they remained closed but the crowd kept pushing, he said. Defense Minister General Richard Rakotonirina, however, said that it was unclear what had caused the crowd surge.

The crush occurred as Madagascar was celebrating the 59th anniversary of its independence. A military parade took place earlier in the stadium, and Rwandan Head of State Paul Kagame was invited as a guest of honor of President Andry Rajoelina.

== Victims ==
At least 16 people died and 101 others were injured. The dead and injured were taken to the Joseph Ravoahangy Andrianavalona Hospital.

== Aftermath and responses ==
President Rajoelina, his wife, and other government officials visited the injured at the hospital in the city to offer their condolences after the incident, and Rajoelina promised to pay for the hospitalization expenses.

== See also ==
- List of fatal crowd crushes
