= 2004 Miyun stampede =

Human crush in Beijing, China

Date	February 5, 2004
Location	Miyun District; Beijing, China
Type of accident	Stampede
Cause	A person tripped and fell
Fatalities	37
Non-fatal injuries	15

The 2004 Miyun stampede (Chinese: 2004年北京密云灯会踩踏事故) also known as the Beijing lantern festival stampede was a human stampede that occurred in a crowded lantern festival in Miyun District, Beijing, resulting in 37 deaths and 15 injuries.

== Background ==
The Lantern Festival, or the Spring Lantern Festival, is a Chinese festival celebrated on the fifteenth day of the first month in the lunisolar Chinese calendar. It marks the final day of the traditional Chinese New Year celebrations, and falls on some day in February or March in the Gregorian calendar.

== Disaster ==
At the Mihong Park, when people were celebrating the lantern festival on a bridge, a spectator tripped on an open grate and fell, causing a chain-reaction of people falling upon each other.

Wu Kun, a spokesman for the Beijing city government described the stampede:

One person fell down on a grate in the park and caused many people to fall down, there was a stampede. It was a lot of people. I'm not sure how many. These things are packed.

== Aftermath ==
After the accident, Beijing Mayor Liu Qi, rushed to the scene of the disaster, and Hu Jintao and Premier Wen Jiabao ordered local authorities to investigate how the accident happened and "to try their best to save the injured and make suitable arrangement for the families of the dead."

Two police officers, Sun Yong and Chen Bainian, were sentenced to three years in jail for dereliction of duty by the 2nd Branch of Beijing Municipal People's Procuratorate.
