= 1988 Dasharath Stadium disaster =

Crowd crush in Kathmandu, Nepal

Coordinates: 27.6947°N 85.3152°E

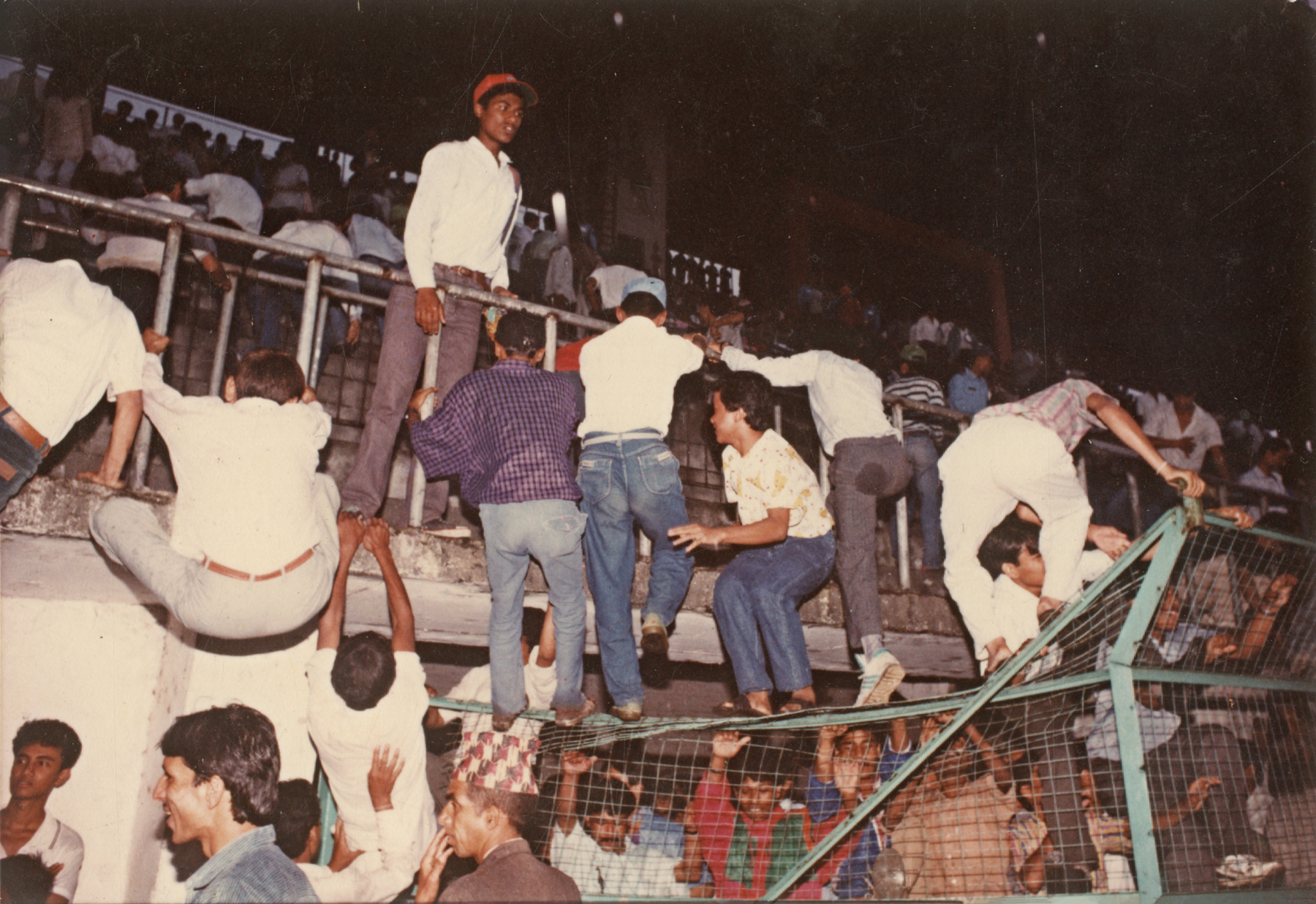
- Date: 12 March 1988
- Location: Dasarath Rangasala Stadium Kathmandu, Nepal
- Cause: Overcrowding
- Deaths: 93
- Injuries: More than 100

The Dasharath Stadium Disaster occurred on 12 March 1988 at the Dasharath Stadium in Kathmandu, Nepal during a football match between the Janakpur Cigarette Factory and Bangladeshi side Muktijoddha Sangsad KC for the 1988 Tribhuvan Challenge Shield. Ninety-three people were killed and more than 100 were injured in a stampede when spectators trying to flee from a hailstorm rushed to the locked doors of the stadium. The Dasharath Stadium disaster was the ninth biggest stadium disaster until 2006 and the worst stadium disaster in Nepal.

== Build up ==
The Dasarath Rangasala Stadium is open terrace on three sides with the west side having the only grandstand. It hosts most of Nepal's domestic and international games, and the final of the Tribhuvan Challenge Shield 1988 was no exception. Thirty thousand spectators were present. News reports state that the weather on the day was not bad, with sunshine throughout. Mahesh Bista, the-then executive committee member of the All Nepal Football Association (ANFA), said they were initially looking to postpone the match but, "we decided to hold it as the rainy morning had changed into a sunny afternoon".

== Disaster ==
There are often significant hailstorms in Nepal at this time of year. A large hail began to lash the crowd, causing some panic. The crowd surged towards the west stand cover but was beaten back by the police. The spectators then returned to the south terrace where a crush developed in a tunnel exit. The crowd could not escape, because the stadium doors were locked, causing a fatal crush at the front.

== Aftermath ==
Despite the huge loss of life and hundreds of fans being injured, the government of Nepal at that time decided not to compensate the victims. The reason they gave was that the fans were at the stadium by their own choice, and the government played no part in causing the catastrophe.

After the disaster, the Minister for Education and Culture, Keshar Bahadur Bista, and president of the All-Nepal Football Association, Kamal Thapa, resigned. The stadium was later renovated for the 1999 South Asian Games with the help of the Chinese government.
