= Pratapgarh stampede =

2010 crowd crush in India

Coordinates: 25°37′9″N 81°41′12″E

- Stampede in Uttar Pradesh
- Date: 4 March 2010
- Location: Kunda, Uttar Pradesh, India
- Deaths: at least 63
- Injuries: 100+

The Pratapgarh stampede was a crowd crush incident that occurred on 4 March 2010, at Ram Janki temple of the Kripalu Maharaj ashram in Kunda, Uttar Pradesh, India, that killed 63 people and seriously injured 74 more. The incident occurred as 10,000 people attended the temple to receive free items, such as clothes and food, on the first anniversary of the death of the wife of Kripalu Maharaj.

== Cause ==
An unfinished temple gate fell, which may have led to a panic among the crowd and to the stampede. Some were crushed beneath the gate while others were trampled by other members of the crowd. The cause of the gate's fall was not immediately clear, but it may have been torn down by the crowd. This year's lunch had increased attendance due to "the prior announcement that some utensils would also be distributed along with lunch", a lawmaker said. A nearby tea stall owner, witness to the stampede, reported people fearing electrocution may have caused panic. As rumours broke out that a live electric wire was in the area and had already electrocuted someone, the crowd rushed towards the under-construction gate causing it to crash.

== Stampede ==
Of the more than 63 deaths, there were at least 37 children and 26 women, who collapsed onto their children and were trampled themselves. There are no reports of any deaths or injuries to men. Many of the dead were poor villagers taking advantage of the offer of free food. Witnesses said police exacerbated the incident by beating people with lathis.

== Aftermath ==
Indian television aired images of stones being thrown. People and media complained about the lack of crowd control techniques at the temple thereby exaggerating the death toll. Many hundreds of weeping friends and relatives went to a local hospital upon hearing of the stampede. An inquiry was asked for by the Uttar Pradesh state government. A report is expected to be finalised within 48 hours. The ashram remained closed since the incident and large number of policemen including armed personnel were stationed outside its gates. President of Indian National Congress and chairman of ruling United Progressive Alliance, Sonia Gandhi, condoled the deaths of women and children in stampede.

On 5 March Prime Minister Manmohan Singh announced a compensation of ₹200,000 (US$2,100) to relatives of those died in stampede and ₹50,000 (US$520) to those who were seriously injured. On 10 March Uttar Pradesh Chief Minister Mayawati announced "...compensation of Rs. 2.50 lakh [(250,000)] each for the next of kin of the 63 persons who died ... [and] Rs. 75,000 ... for each of the 74 who were injured." It's not clear whether this was (or was intended to be) in addition to the Prime Minister's announced payments.

On 7 March, spiritual guru Kripaluji Maharaj's Bhakti Dham Ashr announced that it would pay a lakh (100,000) rupees each to the families of the 63 dead and Rs. 50,000 to each of the 64 injured. The funds were given to the district magistrate to distribute to the correct parties.
