= Sokolniki disaster =

1975 crowd crush in Moscow, Soviet Union

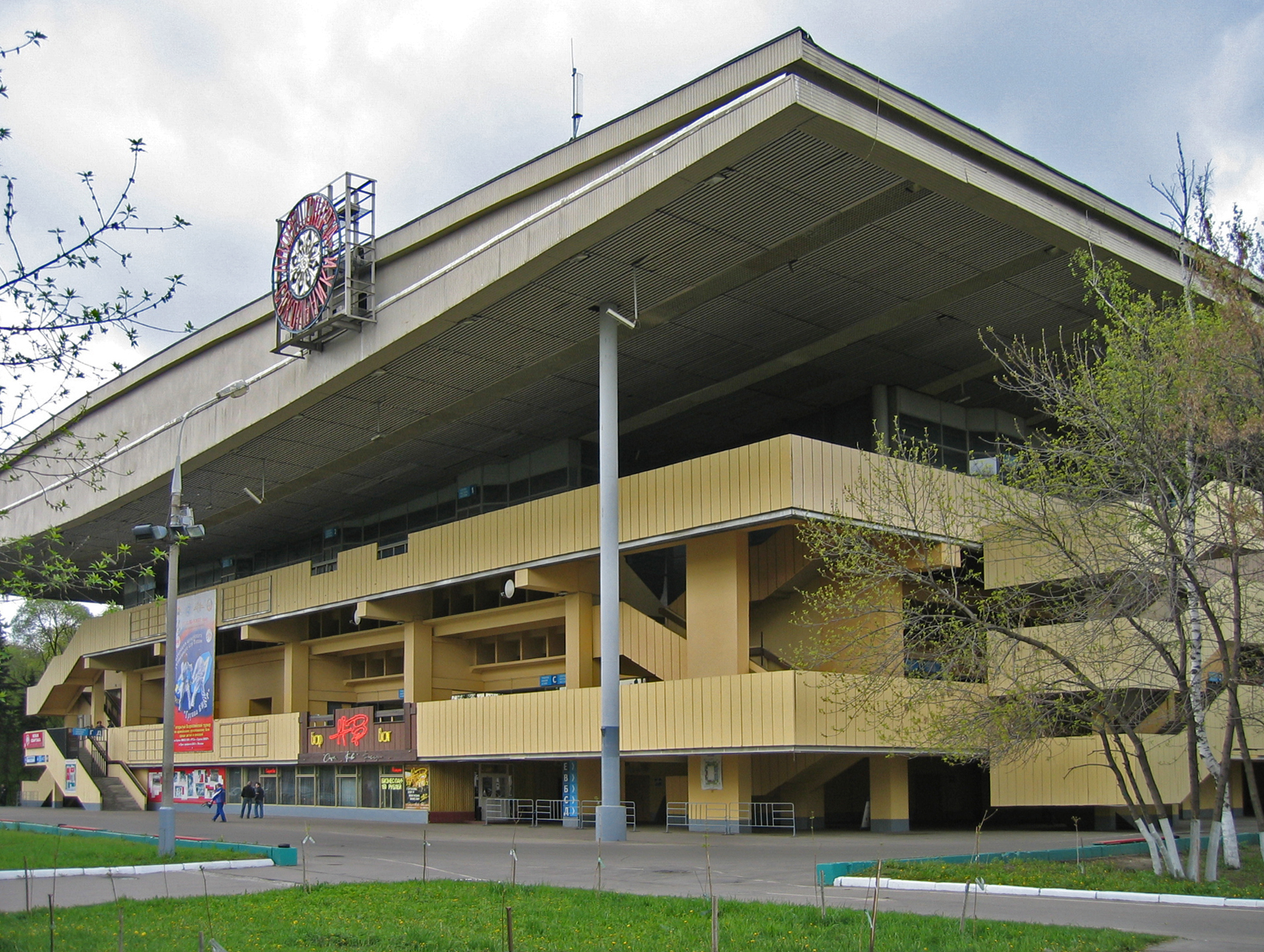
- Sokolniki Sports Palace
- Date: 10 March 1975
- Location: Sokolniki Sports Palace, Moscow, Soviet Union
- Type: Crowd crush
- Deaths: 21
- Injuries: 25

The Sokolniki disaster was a crowd crush on 10 March 1975 at an exit of the Sokolniki Sports Palace in Moscow, after a friendly ice hockey match between the Soviet junior national team and the Canadian junior team Barrie Co-op. Twenty-one people died, thirteen of them school-age children, and 25 were injured. (Note: Most retrospective accounts give 25 injured; Metro gives 23.) The disaster became widely known as the "chewing-gum crush" because of the free gum distributed by the Canadian side.

== Background ==
Early in 1975 the Barrie Co-op junior team from Ontario travelled to the Soviet Union for five friendlies against Soviet junior sides. The tour was sponsored by the chewing-gum manufacturer Wrigley, and the Canadian players received boxes of gum to distribute free of charge. Retrospective accounts describe imported gum as a sought-after novelty for Soviet schoolchildren. The match on 10 March was the third of the tour and drew approximately 4,500 spectators, many of them local schoolchildren.

The Soviet roster included future Olympic champions Alexander Kozhevnikov, Sergei Makarov and Vyacheslav Fetisov. Kozhevnikov and Fetisov later recalled being assembled for the series at short notice.

== Events ==
Retrospective accounts differ over the gum distribution. Sovetsky Sport and Moskvich Mag describe gum being thrown to spectators during the tour. Several witnesses quoted by Metro instead said that members of the Canadian delegation handed it out and disputed that the players threw it during the fatal match.

After the final siren, many spectators moved towards the southeastern exit, which led towards the metro and the team buses. The arena had four stairwell exits. Three were open, but the gate at that exit had been closed shortly before the end of the match. People descending the stairs could not see the closed metal gate until they reached its lower end, while those behind continued to press forward. Several witnesses also remembered the lights going out. The reasons for the locked gate and the lighting failure remain uncertain in the retrospective accounts.

Survivor Alexander Medvedev recalled people falling one over another and being unable to breathe before friends pulled him clear. He later said that he had not seen gum being thrown that evening. Andrey Kotov, who attended the two earlier matches, did recall Canadians throwing gum into the aisles on those occasions. The tour's gum promotion is therefore documented, but witnesses disagree about its scale and role on the night of the crush.

== Investigation and physical changes ==
The arena director and other officials were prosecuted. Retrospective accounts agree that the custodial sentences were cut short, but differ on their length and on the deputy director's punishment. (Note: Argumenti Nedeli reports three-year sentences for the arena director and two police officials, followed by an amnesty in 1975. Metro instead gives the director five years and says that his deputy received a suspended sentence.)

The Sports Palace subsequently underwent a lengthy reconstruction that increased the number of exits from four to ten, reduced the steepness of the stairs and improved exit lighting. A memorial plaque was installed at the arena in April 2013. The old building was demolished in 2021 and replaced by a modern ice arena.

== Contemporary reporting ==
Reporting outside the Soviet Union was sparse. On 13 March 1975 The New York Times reported an undisclosed number of deaths and injuries, citing a brief Moskovskaya Pravda acknowledgment that a commission of inquiry had been formed. It did not give the 21-person toll used in later accounts.
