= Vaishno Devi Temple stampede =

2022 disaster in Jammu and Kashmir

Vaishno Devi Temple crowd crush
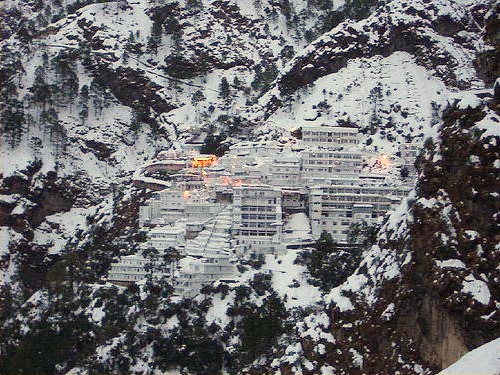
- Vaishno Devi Temple during winter
- Date: 1 January 2022; 4 years ago
- Time: Mid-night; Between 00:00 to 01:00 IST
- Location: Vaishno Devi Temple, Katra, Jammu and Kashmir, India; 33.0299°N 74.9482°E
- Cause: altercation between a group of devotees
- Deaths: 12
- Injuries: 16

On 1 January 2022, 12 people were killed and 16 others injured in a crowd crush near to Gate No. 3 at the Vaishno Devi Temple in Katra, Jammu and Kashmir, northern India.

== Crush ==
Hundreds of people were packed inside the Vaishno Devi Temple corridor to offer prayers shortly after midnight to start the first day of the new year of 2022. Outside the temple, the roads leading to it were packed with people, with an eyewitness claiming there was hardly room to walk. Around 2:30 am many recall hearing a large commotion before the crush.

An eyewitness claimed to have fallen with about two dozen people after watching a large crowd leave the temple and those behind them surged forward, and felt that he was going to die as people continue to move over those who had died. Another recounted that they had fallen due to people pushing them near a pathway at the shrine, with another eyewitness claiming that the crowd suddenly turned aggressive and created a stampede.

== Investigation ==
The government launched an investigation into the crush. A three-member inquiry panel, headed by Principal Secretary Shaleen Jabra was created and tasked with completing a report within a week from the stampede. An announcement was issued to the public, inviting any information or documentation about the stampede be brought forward for investigators via email, phone or WhatsApp message or by appearing before the Enquiry Committee.

== Response ==
Prime Minister Narendra Modi stated that he was "saddened" by the loss of life.

The Lieutenant Governor of Jammu and Kashmir, Manoj Sinha announced on 2 January that all next of kin of those who died in the crush would receive an additional ₹5 lakh (equivalent to ₹5.3 lakh or US$5,500 in 2023) ex-gratia for a total compensation of ₹15 lakh (equivalent to ₹16 lakh or US$17,000 in 2023).

== See also ==
- Crowd collapses and crushes § Crowd "stampedes"
