= 2023 Pakistan ration distribution stampedes =

Crowd crushes in Pakistan

- Date: March-June 2023
- Location: Multiple cities in Pakistan, including Charsadda, Karachi, Mirpurkhas, and Shaheed Benazirabad
- Type: Crowd crush
- Cause: Subsidized flour sales by the government leading to large crowds and lack of proper crowd control measures
- Deaths: 15
- Injuries: 45

Crowd crushes for free goods in different cities in Pakistan in March, April, and June 2023 left 15 people dead and 45 others injured. In Karachi, 12 people, including three children, were killed and five others wounded during the distribution of zakat among the families of employees working at a private company. Meanwhile, in Charsadda, a city in the northwestern Khyber Pakhtunkhwa province, one person died and eight others were injured in a crush for free flour during the first day of Ramadan. One died in Mirpurkhas. A crowd crush in Sakrand town, Shaheed Benazirabad, resulted in three females, including a minor, being injured. One old man died and eight people were hurt in Vehari and Muzaffargarh while receiving free flour. Finally, on June 26, a stampede in Karachi injured twenty-one women during the disbursement of funds for the Benazir Income Support Programme.

== Charsadda ==
On the first day of Ramadan, a crush for free flour in Charsadda, Khyber Pakhtunkhwa province, resulted in one death and eight injuries: nine people were trampled, one of them fatally, according to the police chief, Muhammad Arif.

== Karachi ==
On 31 March 2023, in Karachi's Sindh Industrial and Trading Estate (SITE) area, a crush occurred, leading to the death of twelve people, including three children, and five others injured during the distribution of Zakat among the families of employees working at a private company. The incident happened when a large group of about 400 women gathered to receive rations from the factory, and the staff closed the doors due to fear of a large crowd. There were no queue arrangements, and the police had not been informed about the activity. The factory owner was absent, and the police arrested seven employees for negligence.

Following the incident, the Sindh Chief Minister requested a report from the Karachi Commissioner. The provincial government pledged compensation of Rs500,000 for the families of the deceased and Rs100,000 for the injured. The Human Rights Commission of Pakistan called for the government to improve the distribution system, emphasizing that the crush underscored people's desperation caused by rising costs, aggravated by Pakistan's plummeting currency and the removal of subsidies agreed upon with the International Monetary Fund (IMF) to unlock the latest tranche of its financial support packages.

== See also ==
- Crowd collapses and crushes#Crowd "stampedes"
