= Theatre Royal disaster =

Crowd crush in Glasgow, 1849

Coordinates: 55.8560°N 4.2518°W

- Date: 19 February 1849
- Location: Theatre Royal, Dunlop Street, Glasgow
- Deaths: 70 people
- Injuries: dozens

On 19 February 1849, a crowd crush occurred at the Theatre Royal, Dunlop Street, Glasgow when audience members rushed to escape the building during a fire. While the fire itself was extinguished quickly, building occupants on the lower floors who observed commotion above them in the upper gallery did not realize this and rushed for exits. Panic led to a crush at the theatre's doorway, where 65 guests were killed and dozens injured.

== The Building ==
Glasgow's Theatre Royal was located on Dunlop Street, in a building owned and leased by John Henry Alexander. There was a standard theatre inside with an upper gallery, boxes, orchestra pit, and lower gallery. Before the disaster, hundreds of patrons had gathered to watch an evening performance of Surrender at Calais.

== Incident ==
At around 8 pm someone in the upper gallery dropped a lighted paper, causing a small flame. "Fire!" was shouted and attention in the theatre quickly focused to the quickly extinguished flame. Members of the cast and audience implored spectators not to panic and to keep their seats. The victims were largely local residents of the working-class neighborhoods surrounding Dunlop Street.

== See also ==
- Crowd collapses and crushes#Crowd "stampedes"
