= 2023 Brazzaville crowd crush =

Disaster in the Republic of the Congo

2023 Brazzaville crush
- Brazzaville (Republic of the Congo)
- Date: 21 November 2023
- Time: c. 22:15 WAT (UTC+1)
- Location: Brazzaville, Republic of the Congo; 4°16′8″S 15°15′56″E
- Type: Crowd crush
- Deaths: 32
- Injuries: 144

On 21 November 2023, a crowd crush in Brazzaville, the capital of the Republic of the Congo, occurred on the final day of a military recruitment drive in the Michel d'Ornano Stadium, causing at least 32 deaths and 144 injuries.

== Background ==
The Congolese army announced a week prior to the disaster that it was planning to recruit 1,500 people of ages 18 to 25 in a campaign that started on 14 November at the Michel d’Ornano Stadium in Brazzaville. There were reportedly 700 people who signed up on a daily basis prior to the incident.

The youth unemployment rate in the Republic of the Congo is at 42%, and joining the army is seen as a rare job opportunity.

== Events ==
Thousands of youth had reportedly gathered outside the stadium early on 20 November, which was said to be the last day of the recruitment drive. Survivors and residents said that many had waited until the evening, with some "impatient" applicants forcing their way into the stadium, causing the crush. Some of the applicants forced the stadium's gates open while others jumped over the walls.

At least 31 people were killed and 145 others were injured. The death toll was initially reported at 37 before it was found that six deaths occurred elsewhere. Another person died of her injuries on 25 November, raising the death toll to 32.

== Aftermath ==
A crisis unit was created under Prime Minister Anatole Collinet Makosso, while the public prosecutor said an investigation would be launched. The government said it would shoulder funeral expenses for the fatalities and medical treatment for the injured, while the army said it would suspend its recruitment drives until further notice.

A day of mourning for the victims of the disaster was declared on 22 November, with flags set at half-mast and "bars, dance clubs, beverage outlets, and festive venues" closed.
