= 1807 Newgate disaster =

Crowd crush at Newgate Prison, London

The Newgate disaster of 1807
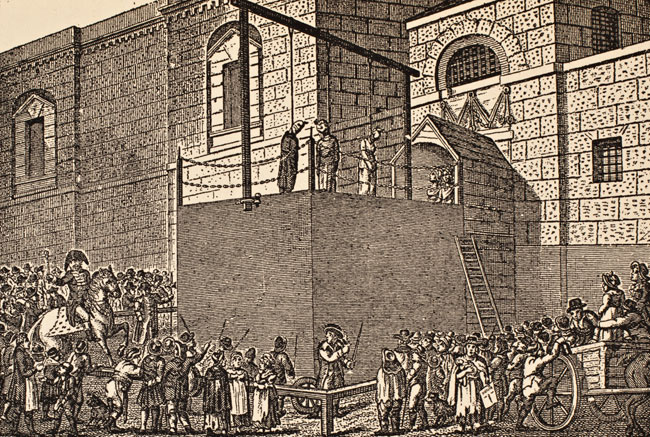
- An early 19th century public hanging at Newgate prison
- Date: 23 February 1807
- Time: 08:06–08:08
- Location: Newgate prison, London, England; 51.5094°N 0.1012°W
- Type: Human crush
- Deaths: 27–34
- Injuries: 15 seriously

The 1807 Newgate disaster or the Old Bailey Accident of 1807 was a crowd crush that occurred outside London's Newgate Prison on 23 February 1807. The disaster occurred when part of a large, dense crowd, gathered to witness a triple execution, was destabilised after being disturbed by a collapsing wooden cart, triggering a chain of events leading to a fatal crowd crush. Many fatalities and severe injuries resulted, with newspapers reporting that at least 27 perished in the accident and one observer counting at least 34 dead.

== The condemned ==
The 1806 trials of John Holloway and Owen Haggerty at the Old Bailey for the slaying of John Cole Steele, a lavender nursery owner from London murdered in 1802, attracted much newspaper coverage and publicity. Both men were convicted of murder based on circumstantial evidence and the testimony of an accomplice, one Benjamin Hanfield, who claimed Holloway bludgeoned John Steele to death while the three were robbing him at Hounslow Heath. Holloway and Haggerty were sentenced to be hanged at Newgate Prison alongside condemned murderer Elizabeth Godfrey (convicted of a fatal stabbing in a separate case), while Hanfield's punishment of transportation for a theft was dismissed for his testimony. Due to the perceived injustice of Holloway and Haggerty being sentenced to death based on such evidence, many contemporaries believed the pair were innocent and the ensuing outrage attracted a massive and rambunctious crowd to the public execution at Newgate Prison.

== The crowd ==
A crowd of around 40,000 gathered in front of Newgate Prison near the Old Bailey on the morning of 23 February 1807 to witness Holloway and Haggerty's execution. People from as far as Hounslow and Bagshot came to observe the sentences be carried out, clambering onto carts, lampposts, and window ledges to spectate. "Not only the space in front of the Old Bailey, but all the windows and the tops of houses adjoining, were crowded with spectators, and the avenues to the remotest point..." The crowd had been so thick at the north side of the Old Bailey that its movements were compared to ocean waves.

== The disaster ==
John Holloway further excited the crowd by proclaiming en route to the scaffold "Gentlemen, I am quite innocent of this affair. I never was with Hanfield, nor do I know the spot. I will kneel and swear it." Around 08:06–08:08 the executioner pulled the lever and the hatch beneath Holloway, Haggerty, and Godfrey dropped. The overheated, impatient spectators surged forward toward the scaffolding to obtain better view of the executions. Observers from the corner of Green Arbor Lane were startled when the axletree of a wooden cart overloaded with people broke, collapsing the cart and knocking those on top of it to the ground. Subsequently, a pieman a few yards away dropped a large basket of merchandise in the uproar, falling while attempting to pick it up and tripping others who were then trampled with him.

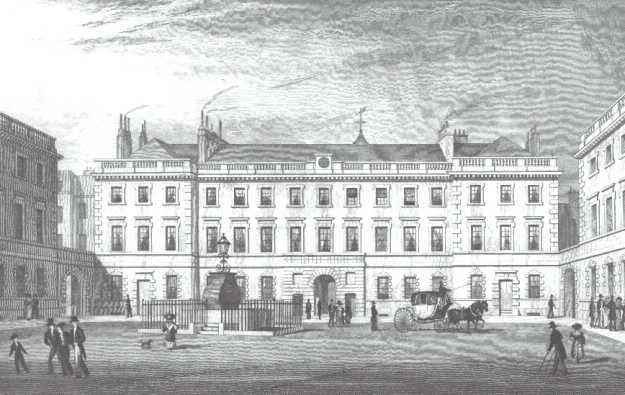
Those injured in the accident were treated at St. Bartholomew's Hospital.

When the wooden cart collapsed, the spectators who fell from it were crushed to death as people behind the cart pushed forward to climb on top (either to watch the executions or escape the crush). The pressurised crowd pushed back against the cart, causing yet more carnage and possibly tripping the pieman who was just yards away. These dual accidents startling the disorganised crowd on the relatively narrow street resulted in dozens of people being killed and many others being injured. The scene lasted for over an hour as individuals slowly cleared out from the area, with a significant portion of the crowd remaining long after the executions were carried out. Once authorities had cleared out the remaining spectators there seemed to be around 100 injured or dead individuals lying in the street in front of Newgate Prison. Newspapers reported on death tolls between 20 and 30, but one contemporary account describes 34 dead and at least 15 serious injuries. The injured were taken to St Bartholomew's Hospital.
