= 2024 Hathras crowd crush =

Crowd crush in Uttar Pradesh, India

2024 Uttar Pradesh crowd crush
- 2024 Hathras crowd crush (Uttar Pradesh) 2024 Hathras crowd crush (India)
- Date: 2 July 2024; 23 months ago
- Location: Hathras district, Uttar Pradesh, India; 27°40′06″N 78°25′07″E
- Cause: Overcrowding
- Deaths: 121
- Injuries: At least 150

On 2 July 2024, a crowd crush occurred at the conclusion of a satsang organised by a self-styled godman in the village of Mughal Garhi in Hathras district of the Indian state of Uttar Pradesh. The incident resulted in the deaths of 121 people, most of whom were women and children, and the hospitalisation of at least 150 others. The incident occurred when about 250,000 people showed up for the event, which had permission for at most 80,000.

== Incident ==
On 2 July 2024, a satsang (a religious event) was organised in the village of Mughal Garhi in Hathras district of the Indian state of Uttar Pradesh by the Sri Jagat Guru Baba organisation, founded by a local preacher, Suraj Pal, also known as Narayan Sakar Hari or Bhole Baba. A makeshift tent had been erected in a muddy field for the event. The crowd crush occurred at the conclusion of the event, when people attempted to leave the premises.

== Victims ==
The incident resulted in the deaths of 123 people, most of whom were women and children, and the hospitalisation of at least 150 others.

== Aftermath ==
The National Disaster Response Force (NDRF) was tasked with the rescue operations. A responding police officer also died of a heart attack. Chief Minister of Uttar Pradesh Yogi Adityanath announced an ex-gratia compensation of ₹200,000 (US$2,100) for the families of each of the dead and ₹50,000 (US$520) for the injured. He also instructed officials to investigate the cause of the incident.

== Causes ==
According to the first information report (FIR) lodged by the Uttar Pradesh Police, around 250,000 people showed up for the event, which had permission for at most 80,000. The organisers had not ensured multiple exit routes, resulting in one entry and exit respectively for a crowd of 2.5 lakh. Officials claimed that the deaths occurred when a dust storm caused people to panic and the overcrowding combined with the heat resulted in increased casualties.

Media agencies reported that the exit from the venue was narrow and the crush started when people pushed each other to get a glimpse of Pal and others tried to collect the soil or dirt around his feet. Media reports also reported that attendees were held back for Pal and his group to exit first. Some of the victims fell into a roadside drain during the commotion, while others were crushed as they were sitting or squatting on the ground.

== Investigation ==
Pal was believed to be in his ashram in Mainpuri district in the aftermath of the incident. A lawyer for Pal said that he denied responsibility for the disaster and attributed it to "anti-social elements", while saying that a "criminal conspiracy" was being brought against him. He added that Pal would cooperate with the police investigation. At least 11 people, including six of Pal's aides were arrested in connection with the disaster, along with the chief organiser of the event. A judicial inquiry composed of three members was also created to investigate the incident.

On 9 July 2024, after the preliminary investigation of the inquiry was completed, six government and police officials were suspended for their alleged negligent handling of the event. Senior officials were not notified about the event and according to the Government of Uttar Pradesh, a Hathras senior district official had permitted the event to run without inspecting the venue. The panel also blamed the organisers for hiding details of the event in order to get permission to hold the event. In response to the preliminary findings, Pal's lawyer repeated the claim that the incident was a conspiracy.

== Reactions ==
President Droupadi Murmu and Prime Minister Narendra Modi expressed condolences over the disaster. The ambassadors of China, France and Germany also expressed condolences.

On 17 July, Suraj Pal reiterated claims of a conspiracy, adding that he was "deeply saddened" over the disaster and that it was "inevitable" at the same time.

== See also ==
- Crowd "stampedes" – When the term "stampede" is inaccurate and inappropriate.
