= Corinaldo stampede =

Tragedy in Corinaldo, Italy, in 2018

Coordinates: 43.662476°N 13.028988°E

Corinaldo crowd crush
- Location of Corinaldo within the Province of Ancona
- Date: 8 December 2018
- Time: 01:00 a.m.
- Location: Corinaldo, Marche, Italy
- Cause: Pepper spray induced crowd crush
- Deaths: 6
- Injuries: 200

The Corinaldo stampede was a fatal crowd crush that occurred on 8 December 2018 at the Lanterna Azzurra nightclub in Corinaldo, Marche, Italy. Six people were killed and fifty-nine injured.

== Incident ==
At the time of the event, there was a rap concert headlined by Sfera Ebbasta at the Lanterna Azzurra nightclub. A surge for the exits began at around 1:00 a.m., supposedly after someone sprayed an "irritant substance" into the crowd. At some point during the surge, a metal railing collapsed outside the nightclub, causing people to fall off a walkway and land on top of one another, leading to multiple deaths and injuries.

According to investigators and state radio, there were about 1,400 people inside at the time, even though the nightclub's maximum capacity was of 469. Approximately 600 tickets were scanned for entry, leaving it unclear whether hundreds of others had sneaked into the nightclub.

== Casualties ==
Six people were killed: Emma Fabini, 14; Asia Nasoni, 14; Benedetta Vitali, 15; Mattia Orlandi, 15; Daniele Pongetti, 16; and Eleonora Girolimini, 39, who was accompanying her 11-year-old daughter to the event. 200 other people were injured, seven critically and five seriously.

== Investigation ==
There were multiple reports that the surge was triggered by someone in the club spraying an "irritant substance". Investigators scouring the building announced the discovery of a pepper spray can on 9 December, but did not confirm if it was responsible for triggering a surge for the exits. On 10 December, police announced the arrest of a 16-year-old boy and gang member who was suspected of setting off pepper spray in the nightclub while trying to steal a gold necklace from a female concertgoer. Seven adults, including the club owners and concert organisers, were also held under investigation in relation to the stampede.

In March 2020, six men went on trial for manslaughter in Ancona, with the prosecution arguing that pepper spray was used to facilitate robbery. An additional person arrested on charges of receiving stolen goods and criminal association, agreed to a plea bargain before the trial.

== Reactions ==
Interior Minister Matteo Salvini called for safety codes of public places to be rigorously investigated. Following this statement, two other nightclubs in Italy were shut down because of overcrowding. Sfera Ebbasta, the headliner for the concert, said in an Instagram post that he was saddened by the tragedy and announced his intent to suspend promotional events for the time being.

== See also ==
- Crowd collapses and crushes § Crowd "stampedes"
