= Throb nightclub disaster =

2000 fatal incident in Durban, South Africa

The Throb nightclub disaster occurred on 24 March 2000, when panic broke out after the detonation of a teargas canister at the Throb nightclub in Chatsworth, Durban in South Africa. There were 600 children from age 11-14 celebrating the end of term. The incident resulted with deaths of 13 children and 100 injured. The youngest to die was 11 years old.

== Victims ==
The deceased individuals were later named as:

- Jadeine Mohunlal, 11
- Guresha Naidoo, 15
- Prean Govindsamy, 15
- Junaid Gaffoor, 18
- Leeosha Sowrimuthu, 14
- Nolan Pillay, 17
- Preston Premsingh, 13
- Sumaya Jhetam, 13
- Chantal Maduray, 16
- Vaneshree Pillay, 16
- Rory Soobramoney, 15
- Sumeshan Govender, 12
- Sumaya Kudoos, 16

== Subsequent developments ==
Vincent Pillay, Selvan Naidoo, and Sivanthan Chetty were accused for the incident. Naidoo and Pillay later admitted their involvement in the Durban High Court. Naidoo confessed that he put the canister behind the speakers after Pillay smuggled it inside the club. He said he was offered R5,000 (about US$1,000 at the time) and a job at Silver Slipper Club by Chetty, the manager there.

The Chatsworth Youth Center was opened in 2003 by Nelson Mandela in the memory of the 13 children who died in the incident.

== See also ==
- 2022 East London tavern disaster
- Ibadan Christmas funfair crowd crush
