= 2022 Port Harcourt stampede =

Disaster in Rivers State, Nigeria

- Date: 28 May 2022
- Time: 06:00 (WAT, UTC+01:00)
- Location: Port Harcourt, Rivers State, Nigeria; 4°49′21″N 7°00′00″E
- Type: Charity food drive
- Cause: Stampede
- Organised by: Kings Assembly Pentecostal Church
- Deaths: 31
- Injuries: 7

On 28 May 2022, 31 people were killed and seven others injured in a stampede in Port Harcourt, Rivers State, Nigeria, at a church event where free food was to be given out.

== Background ==
Church leaders from a local King's Assembly Pentecostal Church have organised 'Shop for free' charity events since 2014, where attendees receive free food and gifts. This event would have been the fourth held by the church, which was usually hosted at the church building. The 28 May 2022 event, due to an expectation of larger than normal crowds, was held at Port Harcourt Polo Club instead.

Some attendees had begun gathering the night before to wait for the venue to open, before venue security could get into place.

Several crowd crushes in Nigeria had taken place at food distribution events in previous years, including one the previous year in Borno State.

== Incident ==
By early morning on 28 May, thousands of people had gathered for the event, which was due to start at 9 am. Local police state that people waiting in line grew frustrated at how long it was taking and tried to rush to the front, triggering the crush at around 6 am. Some reports state that a small gate was opened, which caused the crowd to surge forward.

At least 31 people died. A police spokesman told reporters that at least a further seven people were injured, some of whom received treatment at the local military hospital. Witnesses say that the total death toll could be higher than the official figure.

== Aftermath ==
The event was suspended while injured attendees were treated and authorities investigate the incident. In the aftermath, some church members were attacked and injured by relatives of the victims, according to a witness.

== Reactions ==
The Governor of Rivers State, Ezenwo Nyesom Wike, called for a probe into the incident, and the local police commissioner Eboka Friday requested that charity and religious groups "ensure they work with the police for security and crowd control" in the future. President Muhammadu Buhari expressed his sadness at the event and requested that organisers of future large events plan better to avoid similar tragedies.

The King's Assembly Church stated that they were "deeply saddened" and would be reviewing safety and crowd management procedures for future events. They did not anticipate the size of the crowd in attendance at the event.

=== International ===
- Spain – King Felipe VI and Queen Letizia sent their condolences to President Muhammadu Buhari.
