= Glen Cinema disaster =

1929 fire disaster in Paisley, Scotland

Coordinates: 55.846°N 4.423°W

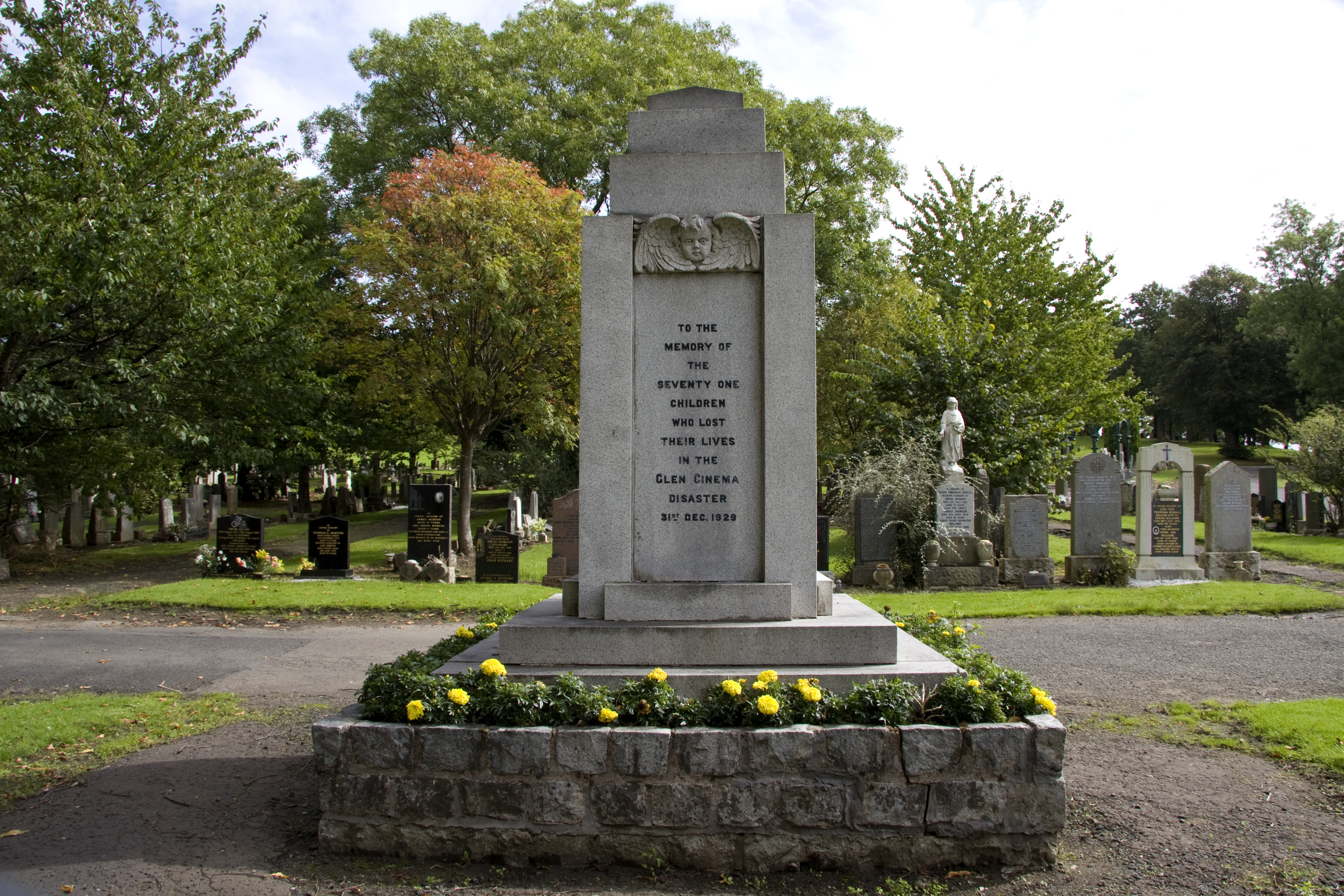
- Memorial to the victims of the Glen Cinema Disaster
- Date: 31 December 1929
- Location: Paisley, Renfrewshire, Scotland,
- Cause: Crush caused by a fire believed to be in the building
- Deaths: 71
- Injuries: 40

The Glen Cinema disaster was a deadly crowd crush caused by a smoking film canister at a cinema in Paisley, Renfrewshire, Scotland, on 31 December 1929. The resulting panic and crush killed 69 children and injured up to 40 others; the final death toll was 71. It is considered one of the worst disasters in Scottish history. The building that housed the Glen Cinema still stands and, as of 2015, houses a furniture store.

== Events ==
The Glen Cinema was opened in 1901; it became known as 'The Glen' and 'The Royal Animated Pictures'. On the afternoon of 31 December 1929, during a children's matinée, the building was crowded with between 700 and 1,000 children, aged between infants to about 14-years-old, in attendance. The matinée was reportedly so well-attended because parents wanted their houses empty to clean for the upcoming Hogmany holiday (new year). In the spool room, a freshly shown film was put in its metal canister when it began to issue thick black smoke. Nitrate film, as used at this time, is highly flammable and can burn on its own without needing any supply of air.

When an assistant film operator spotted the smoke coming from a film canister, he tried to smother the film; but the container sprang open, and smoke and fumes entered the screening hall. Soon smoke filled the auditorium that contained the children, and one survivor claimed that someone shouted "fire" and the children began to run to the exits. Children ran downstairs so fast and in such numbers that they piled up behind the escape door that led to Dyers Wynd. The door could not be opened, as it was designed to open inwards and was padlocked. Others were injured as people jumped from the balconies onto those sitting in the sections below in an attempt to escape.

A policeman who arrived on the scene just after the fire started reported that the gates were padlocked; however, another witness confirmed that she had seen the cinema's manager, Charles Dorward, unlock them. A policeman managed to break the padlock on one of the doors but could not easily open them as the doors opened inward and there were piles of bodies behind them, with people scrambling over to attempt to escape. Some children however, remained in their seats and were removed from the cinema by responding firefighters. Others were rescued when firefighters smashed windows and pulled children from the cinema.

== Victims ==
Seventy-one children died from the resulting crush of children attempting to escape the cinema, with between thirty and forty children injured. Many of the casualties were recorded as having died from "asphyxia by crushing" or "traumatic asphyxia".

== Investigation ==
An inquiry was held in Edinburgh on 29 April 1930, during which it was revealed that the Glen Cinema had been inspected and pronounced safe by the Paisley fire brigade on the morning of the fire. The owner, James Graham, had agreed that there were insufficient exits, but claimed he had repeatedly reminded Dorward that the escape exits were not to be shut during matinée performances. Dorward conceded that the exit gates had sometimes been locked to prevent children from entering the cinema without paying.

The conclusion of the inquiry was that the fire had been started by a short circuit when the film canister had been placed on the top of a battery in the spool room. The tragedy had been made worse by the limited number of exits, insufficient attendants and overcrowding.

Dorward was put on trial for culpable homicide, but found not guilty.

== Aftermath ==
A relief fund for the injured children and bereaved parents raised £5,300 (the equivalent of approximately £338,900 as of 2020). Paisley Town Council offered the children a week's holiday at the seaside.

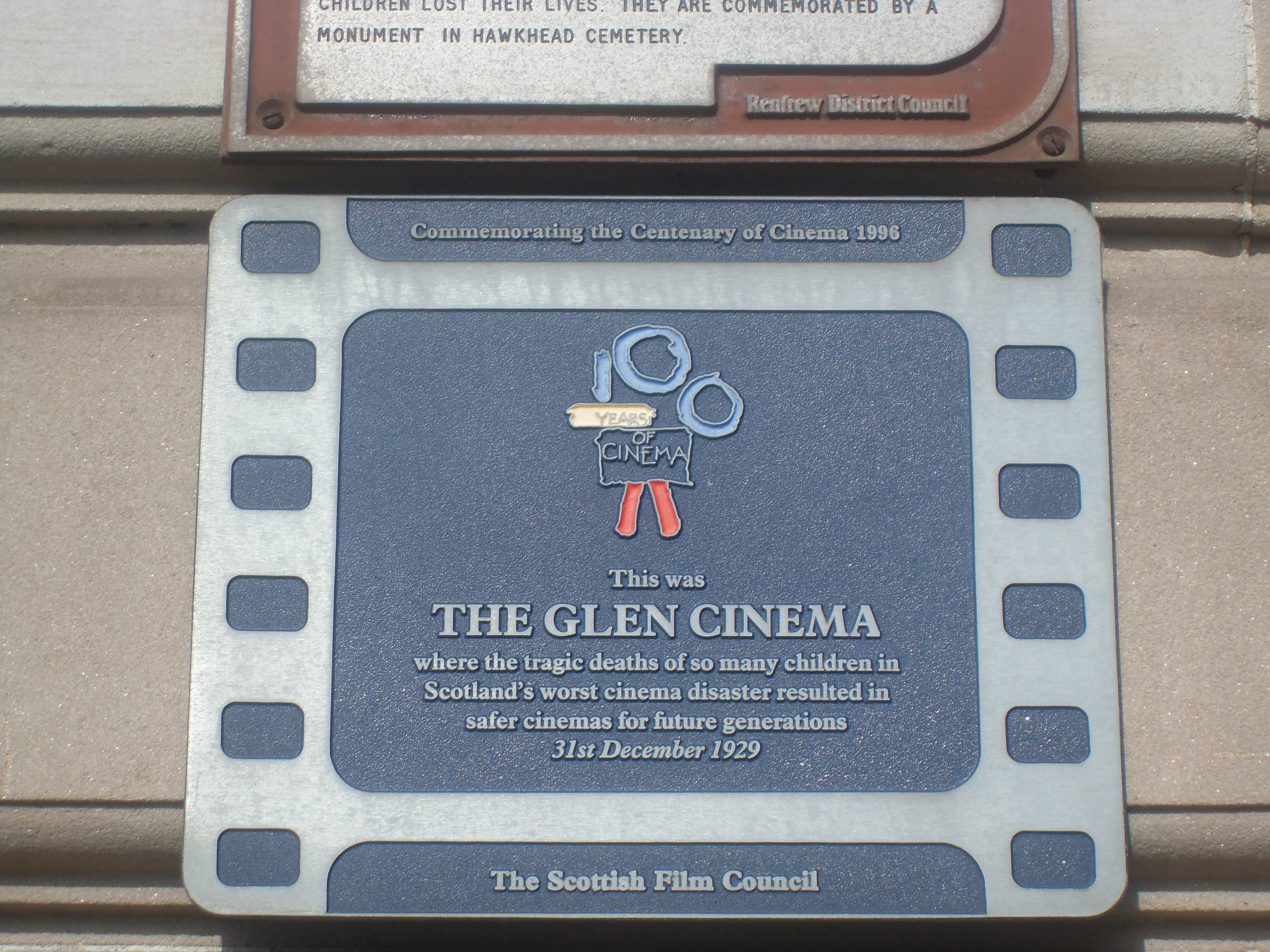
The plaque added by the Film Council

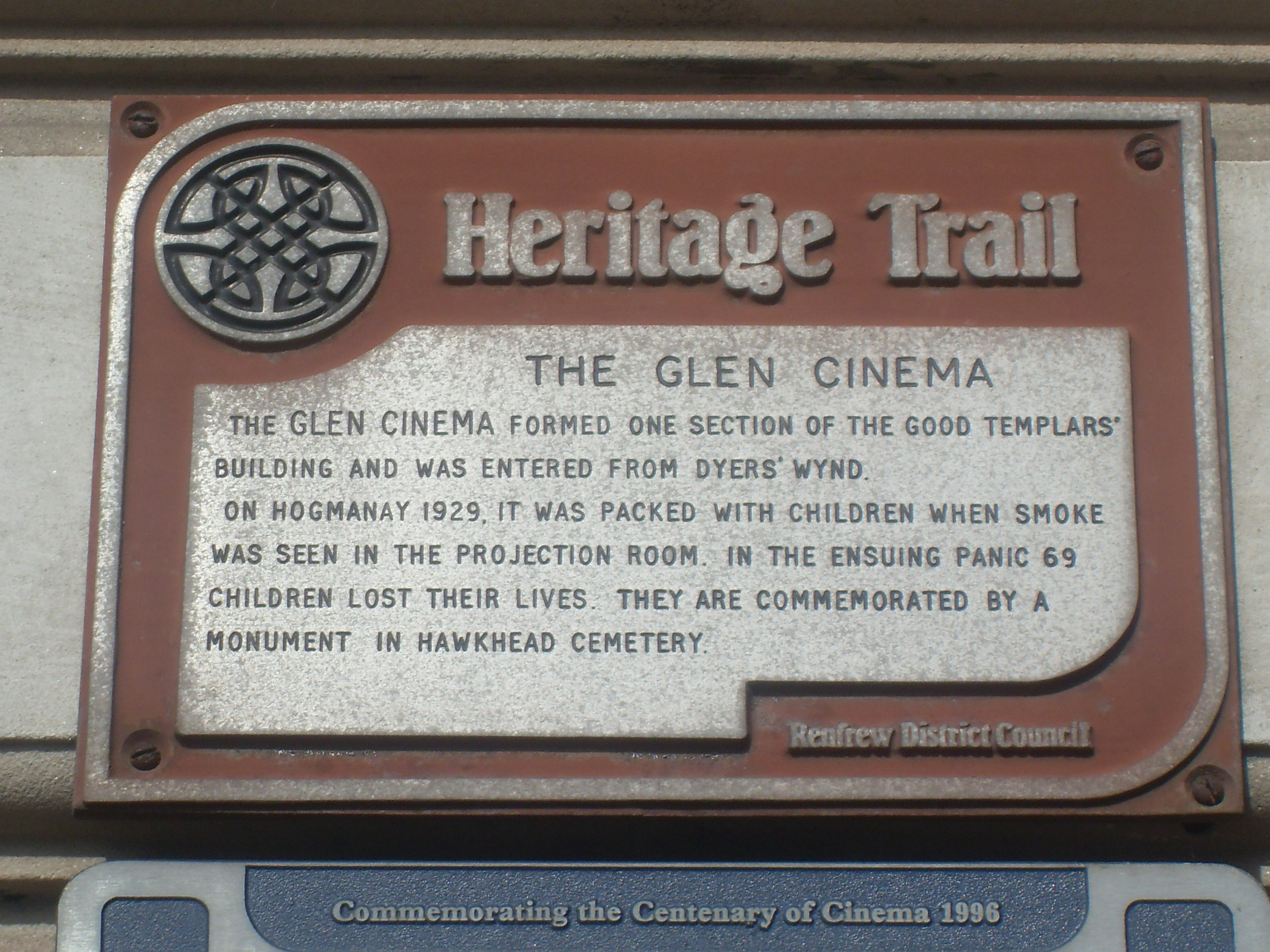
The plaque added by Renfrewshire Council

On 31 December 2009, to mark the eightieth anniversary of the tragedy, a memorial service was conducted by Philip Tartaglia, Bishop of Paisley, and his associates at the Cenotaph war memorial. Survivors congregated to remember the children who lost their lives in the disaster. Wreaths were laid by one of the survivors, Emily Brown, who was five years old at the time of the incident. Since then, the memorial service has become an annual event. Due to the COVID-19 pandemic the ceremony in 2020 was held online.

Safety regulations were tightened in the wake of the disaster; many municipal authorities made inspections of cinemas compulsory. The Cinematograph Act 1909 was amended to ensure that cinemas had more exits, that doors opened outwards, and that they were fitted with push bars. A limitation was also placed on the seating capacity of cinemas.

== Documentation ==
A small display is at Paisley Museum which has some newspaper articles on the disaster, a receipt for a funeral, a pair of shoes, and a hat. There are also letters sent to the Provost of Paisley from other civic leaders in the United Kingdom, the United States and Europe. Some of the more poignant letters are from women who were unable to keep their own children, offering them to the devastated families of Paisley.

A documentary of the disaster was created and screened along with a display of letters of condolences sent to the town after the disaster for the 90th anniversary.

== See also ==
- List of disasters of the United Kingdom and preceding states
- Victoria Hall disaster
