= 2014 Stade Tata Raphaël disaster =

Human crush in Kinshasa, DR Congo

Stade Tata Raphaël disaster
- Date: May 11, 2014
- Location: (Democratic Republic of the Congo) Stade Tata Raphaël, Kinshasa; 4.338056°S 15.322222°E
- Deaths: 15
- Injuries: 24

The 2014 Stade Tata Raphaël disaster refers to a fatal stampede that occurred in Kinshasa, Democratic Republic of the Congo, at the Stade Tata Raphaël on 11 May 2014.

During the match between Congolese football clubs TP Mazembe and Vita Club, missiles were thrown onto the pitch and the referee chose to delay play.

Fifteen people died after police launched tear gas into the stands causing a stampede. A police source who declined to be named put the death toll higher, at 18. Governor Andre Kimbuta said at least 24 other people were injured during the melee that followed.

Supporters were said to have been blinded by the gas, with the panic and confusion contributing to the collapse of a stadium wall. Suffocation was reported to have been the cause of death in most instances.
