= Stampede =

Panicked running of a large group of animals

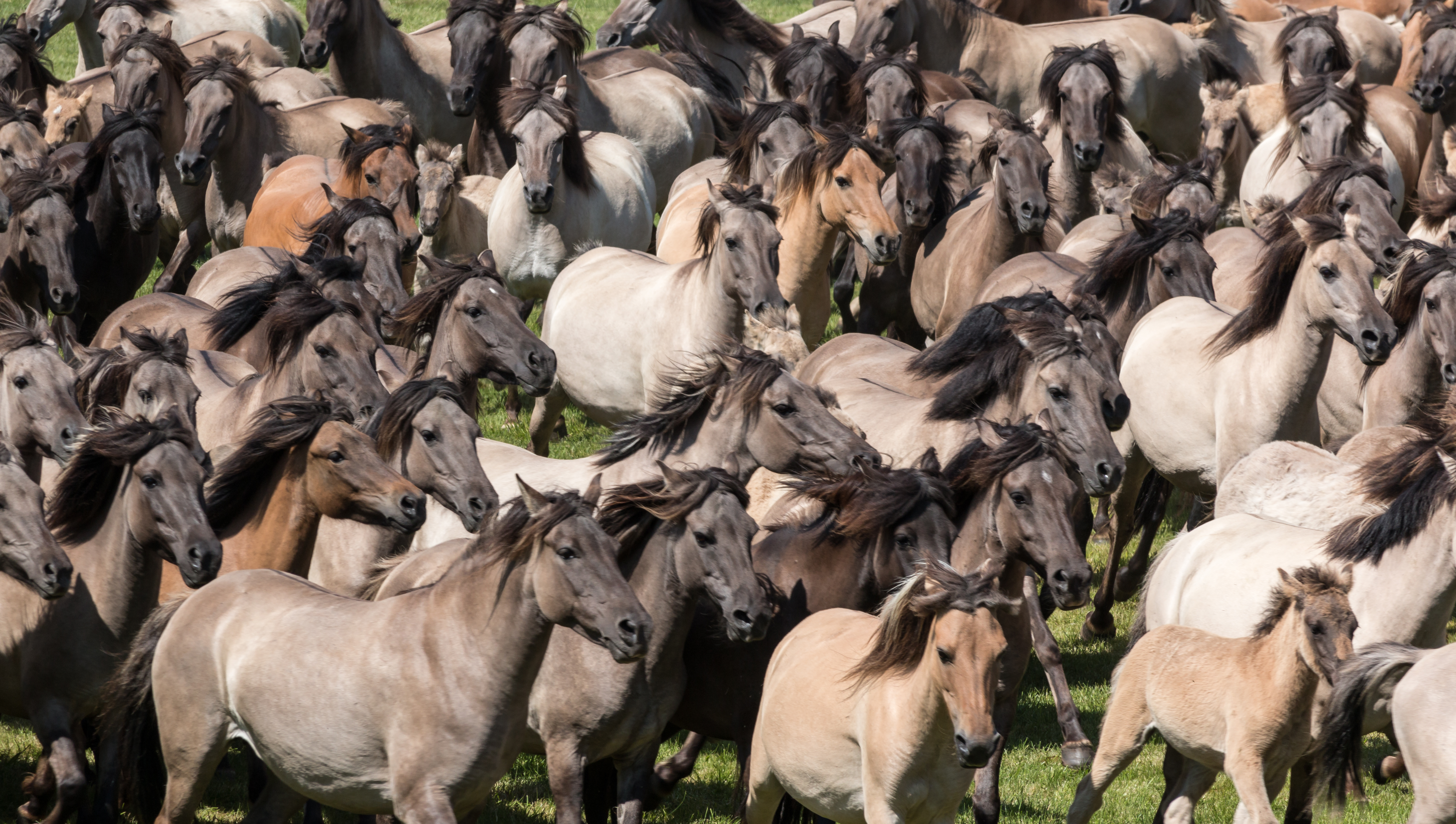
Wild horses stampeding

A stampede (/stæmˈpiːd/) is a situation in which a group of large animals start suddenly running in the same direction, mainly because they are excited or frightened. Although the term is most often applied to animals, there have been cases of people stampeding from danger too.

There is a tendency in the popular press of some countries to misapply the term "stampede" to a crowd collapse or crush.

== In cattle ==
Illustration of horse riders racing a cattle stampede in the old West

The animal behavior of stampeding was observed by cattle ranchers and cowboys in the American Wild West. Large herds of cattle would be managed across wide-open plains, with no fences to contain them. In these unbounded spaces, cattle were able to run freely, and sometimes the whole herd would take off in the same direction unexpectedly. Cowboys developed techniques to deal with this situation and calm the cattle, to stop the stampede and regain control of their herd. The term "stampede" came from the Mexican Spanish term estampida ('an uproar').

Cattle herds tended to be nervous, and any unusual occurrence, particularly a sudden or unexpected noise, could scare the cattle and kick off a stampede. Things such as a gunshot, a lightning strike, a clap of thunder, someone jumping off a horse, a horse shaking itself, or even a tumbleweed being blown into the herd have been known to cause stampedes.

One method used for stopping a stampede is to turn the moving herd into itself so that it runs in wide circles, rather than running off a cliff or into a river. The circle can be made smaller and smaller, eventually forcing the herd to slow down due to lack of space in which to run. Tactics used to make the herd turn into itself include firing a pistol, which creates noise to make the leaders of the stampede turn.

Animals who stampede, especially cattle, are less likely to do so after having eaten and watered, and if they are spread out in smaller groups to digest. To further reduce the risk of stampedes, cowboys sometimes sing or whistle to calm the herds disquieted by nightfall. Those on watch at night avoid doing things which could startle the herd and even distance themselves before dismounting a horse or lighting a match.

Sometimes humans purposefully induce stampedes, such as some Native Americans who were reported to provoke American bison herds to stampede off a buffalo jump, harvesting the animals after they are killed or incapacitated by the fall.

== In humans ==
If you look at the analysis, I've not seen any instances of the cause of mass fatalities being a stampede. People don't die because they panic. They panic because they are dying.

— Keith Still, professor of crowd science at Manchester Metropolitan University

... far from mass panic occurring, being in an emergency can create a common identity among those affected. A consequence of this is that people are cooperative and altruistic towards others – even when among strangers, and/or in life–threatening situations.

— Cocking, Drury and Reicher

A human stampede, in the sense of a mass of people running in panic, can occur in large or dense crowds of people, typically when a large group of people all try to get away from a perceived danger. Trampling is rarely the cause of fatal injuries in stampede conditions, unless egress is impeded.

Human stampedes are rare and, although the term "stampede" is often misapplied to phenomena such as crowd collapses and crushes, it is these latter and not stampedes that are responsible for the majority of fatalities in crowd-related disasters. One prominent difference between the two is that people stampeding have space to run from the danger, whereas people in a crowd crush have nowhere to go. There has been little research conducted into what happens during a human stampede, or what exactly causes them to start.

While media and popular culture depictions tend to exaggerate dangers associated with stampedes, and popular news reports of such instances often mention "panic", actual instances of mass panic are rare, and panic itself is rarely the cause of fatalities in such events.

Stampede is not only an incorrect term, it is a loaded word, as it assigns blame to the victims for behaving in an irrational, self-destructive, unthinking and uncaring manner, it's pure ignorance, and laziness [...] It gives the impression that it was a mindless crowd only caring about themselves, and they were prepared to crush people.

In virtually all these situations, this is not the case, and it is usually the authorities to blame for poor planning, poor design, poor control, poor policing and mismanagement.

The truth is that people are only directly crushed by others who have no choice in the matter, and the people who can choose don't know what is going on because they're too far away from the epicentre.

— Edwin Galea, professor of fire safety engineering at the University of Greenwich, England

== See also ==
- List of fatal crowd crushes
- Rodeo, also called a "stampede" in Canada
- Swarm behavior
