= Kumbh Mela =

Hindu pilgrimage and festival in India

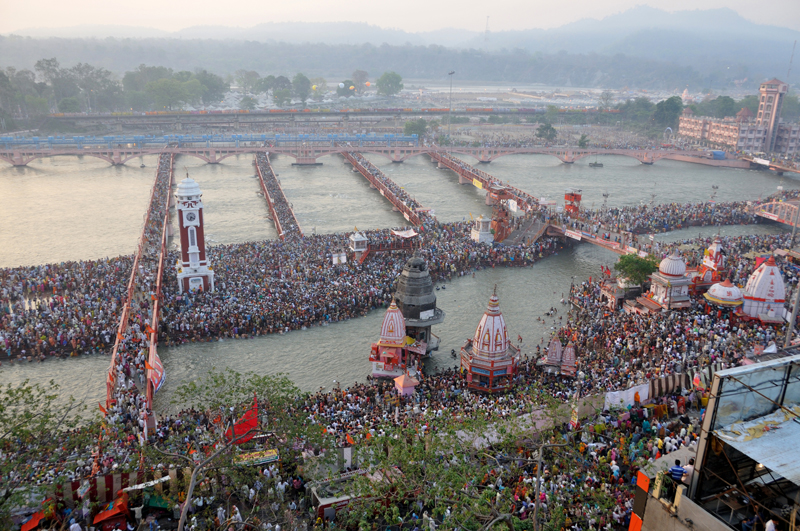
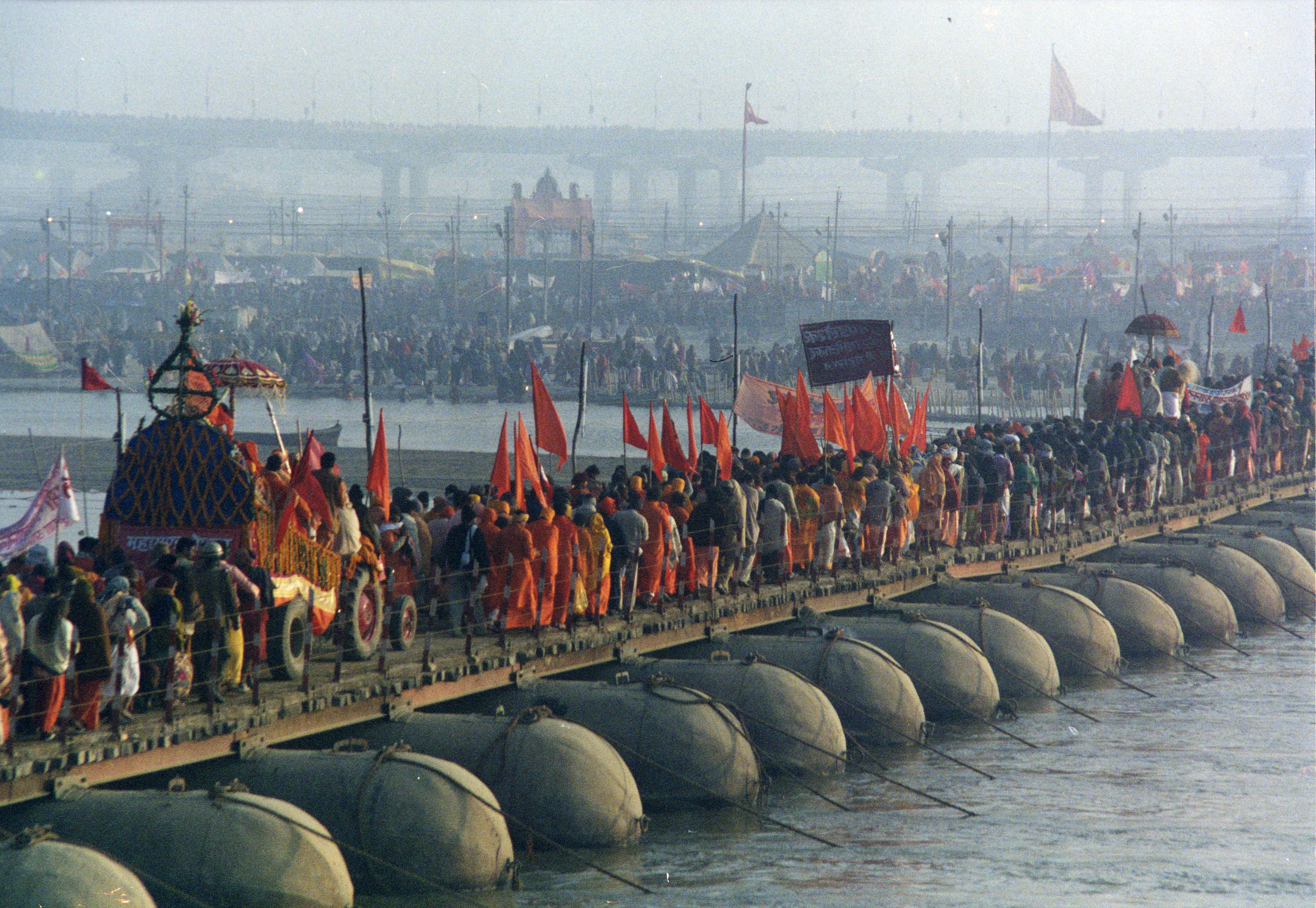
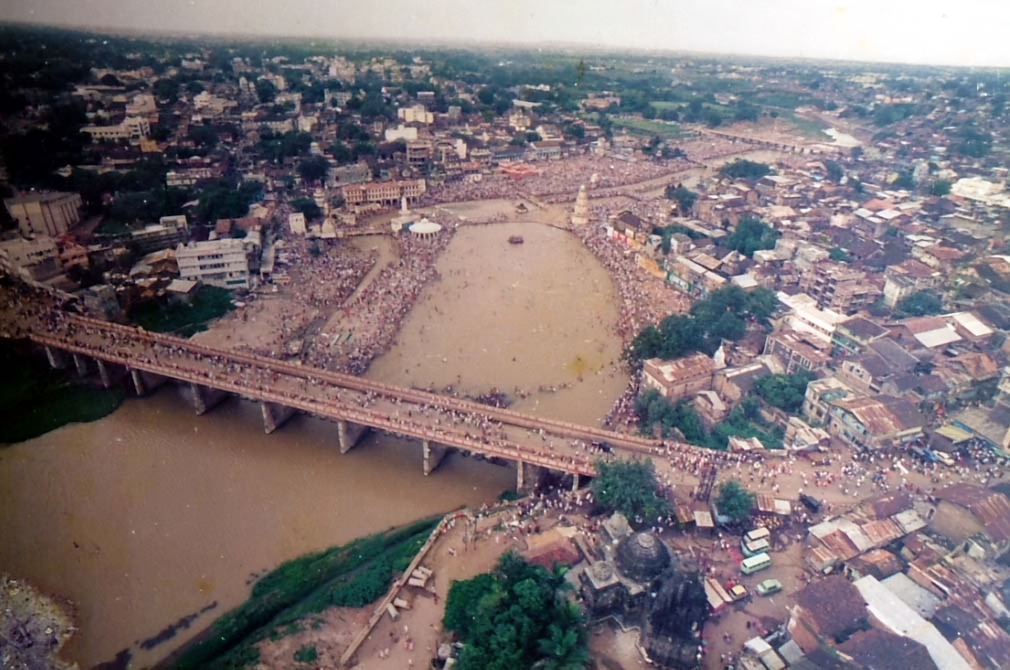
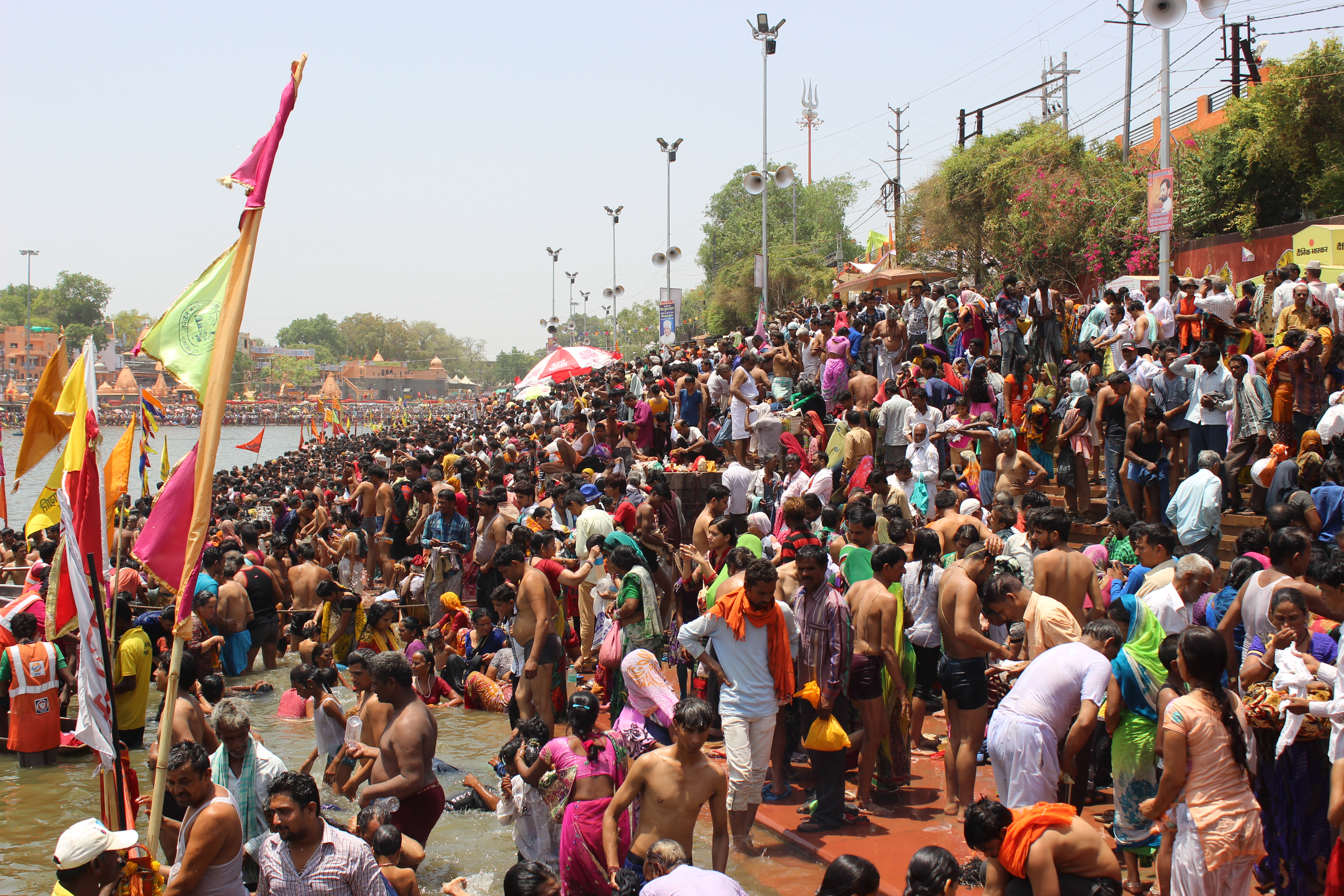
- Haridwar Prayagraj Nashik Ujjain
- Genre: Pilgrimage
- Frequency: Every 6 years; (Ardha Kumbh); Every 12 years; (Purna Kumbh); Every 144 years; (Maha Kumbh)
- Locations: Primary: Haridwar; Prayagraj; Nashik-Trimbak; Ujjain; Other: Bansberia (Note: The Bansberia Kumbh Mela at Tribeni Sangam started in 2022 after nearly 700 years of hiatus); Kumbakonam (Note: Mahamagham is celebrated every 12 years in the Mahamaham tank in Kumbakonam, Tamil Nadu. This tank is believed as the holy confluence of nine Indian river goddesses: Ganga, Yamuna, Sarasvati, Narmada, Godavari, Krishna, Tungabhadra, Kaveri, and Sarayu.); Kurukshetra (Note: Kurukshetra Kumbh Mela occurs after every six years similar to Ardh Kumbh on the occasion of Somvati Amavasya at Brahma Sarovar.); Panauti (Note: Panauti Makar Mela is held every 12 years for the whole month of Magha at Tribenighat, the confluence of Punyamati, Rudravati and the mystic Roshi (Lilawati) rivers.); Rajim (Note: Rajim Punni Mela is celebrated every year during Magha month for about 15 days at Triveni Sangam of Mahanadi, Pairi & Sondur in Rajim, Chhattisgarh.); T. Narasipura (Note: Kumbha Mela at Thirumakudalu Narasipura occurs once in three years since 1989, at the confluence of the Kaveri, Kabini, mythical lake Spatika Sarovara.); Vrindavan (Note: Vrindavan Vaishnav Kumbh is held every 12 years on the banks of the Yamuna River in Vrindavan. It is considered equivalent to the Haridwar Kumbh Mela. In 1760, after a violent conflict between Shaivites and Vaishnavites, the Vaishnavas decided to celebrate the Kumbh Mela in Vrindavan instead of Haridwar. Since then, this tradition has continued.)
- Country: India
- Most recent: Prayag Maha Kumbh (13 January–26 February 2025)
- Next event: Haridwar Ardh Kumbh (March 2027); Nashik-Trimbakeshwar Simhastha (July–August 2027)
- Website: kumbh.gov.in

Kumbh Mela
- UNESCO Intangible Cultural Heritage
- Country: India
- Reference: 01258
- Region: Asia and the Pacific

Inscription history
- Inscription: 2017 (12th session)
- List: Representative
- UNESCO Cultural Heritage

Kumbh Mela (Sanskrit: Kumbha Mēlā, pronounced [kʊˈmbʱᵊ melaː]; lit. 'festival of the Sacred Pitcher') is a Hindu pilgrimage, celebrated every four or twelve years, correlated with the partial or full revolution of Jupiter. These are held at four locations–Prayagraj, Haridwar, Nashik, and Ujjain– at varying time intervals. According to the Puranas, these sites are believed to have received drops of the divine nectar (amrita) during the Samudra Manthana (churning of the ocean of milk). The Kumbh Mela lasts between one and three months, with the Amavasya day attracting the largest crowds. The festival attracts millions of people, with the largest gathering recorded at Prayag. About 660 million attended the Kumbh Mela in 2025, up from 240 million in 2019, making it the largest gathering in the world. It has been inscribed on the UNESCO Representative List of Intangible Cultural Heritage of Humanity.

The Kumbh Mela is observed at each site on a cycle of approximately 12 years (Note: Approximately once a century, the Kumbh Mela returns after 11 years. This is because of Jupiter's orbit of 11.86 years. With each 12-year cycle per the Gregorian calendar, a calendar year adjustment appears in approximately 8 cycles.) based on the Hindu luni-solar calendar and the relative positions of Jupiter, the Sun, and the Moon. As per Hindu astrology, specific alignments of Jupiter, the Sun, and the Moon only occur at the four Kumbh locations in a 12-year cycle. The Prayag and Haridwar festivals are held six years apart, and feature a Maha (major) and Ardha (half) Kumbh Melas. The Kumbh Melas at Ujjain and Nashik are observed either in the same year or a year apart, typically about three years after the Prayag Kumbh Mela.

The festival is held at the confluence of major rivers, and people take a ritual dip in the waters, believed to be a means of prāyaścitta (atonement) for past mistakes, and cleansing of their sins. Various fairs, educational events, religious discourses, mass gatherings of monks, and entertainment are also conducted during the festivities.

Before 1858, the name "Kumbh" was applied only to the 12th occurrence of an annual mela in Haridwar during the Vaishakha month. As mentioned in Hindu texts such as Ramcharitmanas, an annual Magh Mela was held in Prayag during the month of Pausha. The Haridwar mela had seen clashes between rival groups in the past including one in 1796 which resulted in multiple deaths. After the Indian Rebellion of 1857 had been suppressed by the British Raj, the Pragwals (a traditional priest community) in Allahabad proposed the idea of an organised pilgrimage at Prayag under the supervision of the British. The first Kumbh Mela at Prayag was organised in 1870.

In other parts of India, similar but smaller community pilgrimage and bathing festivals are held. Magha or Makar melas that have also been referred to as Kumbh Mela include those held in Kumbakonam, Kurukshetra, Panauti, Rajim, and Sonipat. These are generally held at prominent water bodies at varying time intervals, and attract a large gatherings. For example, the Mahamaham is held in Kumbakonam once every twelve years at the Mahamaham Tank near the Kaveri river.

== Etymology and nomenclature ==
The Kumbha in Kumbha Mela literally means "pitcher, jar, pot" in Sanskrit. It is found in the Vedic texts, in this sense, often in the context of holding water or in mythical legends about the nectar of immortality. The word Kumbha or its derivatives are found in the Rigveda (1500–1200 BCE), for example, in verse 10.89.7; verse 19.16 of the Yajurveda, verse 6.3 of Samaveda, verse 19.53.3 of the Atharvaveda, and other Vedic and post-Vedic ancient Sanskrit literature. In astrological texts, the term also refers to the zodiac sign of Aquarius. The astrological etymology dates to late 1st-millennium CE.

The word mela means "unite, join, meet, move together, assembly, junction" in Sanskrit, particularly in the context of fairs, and community celebrations. This word too is found in the Rigveda and other ancient Hindu texts. Thus, Kumbh Mela means an "assembly, meet, union" around "water or nectar of immortality".

=== Historical origins ===
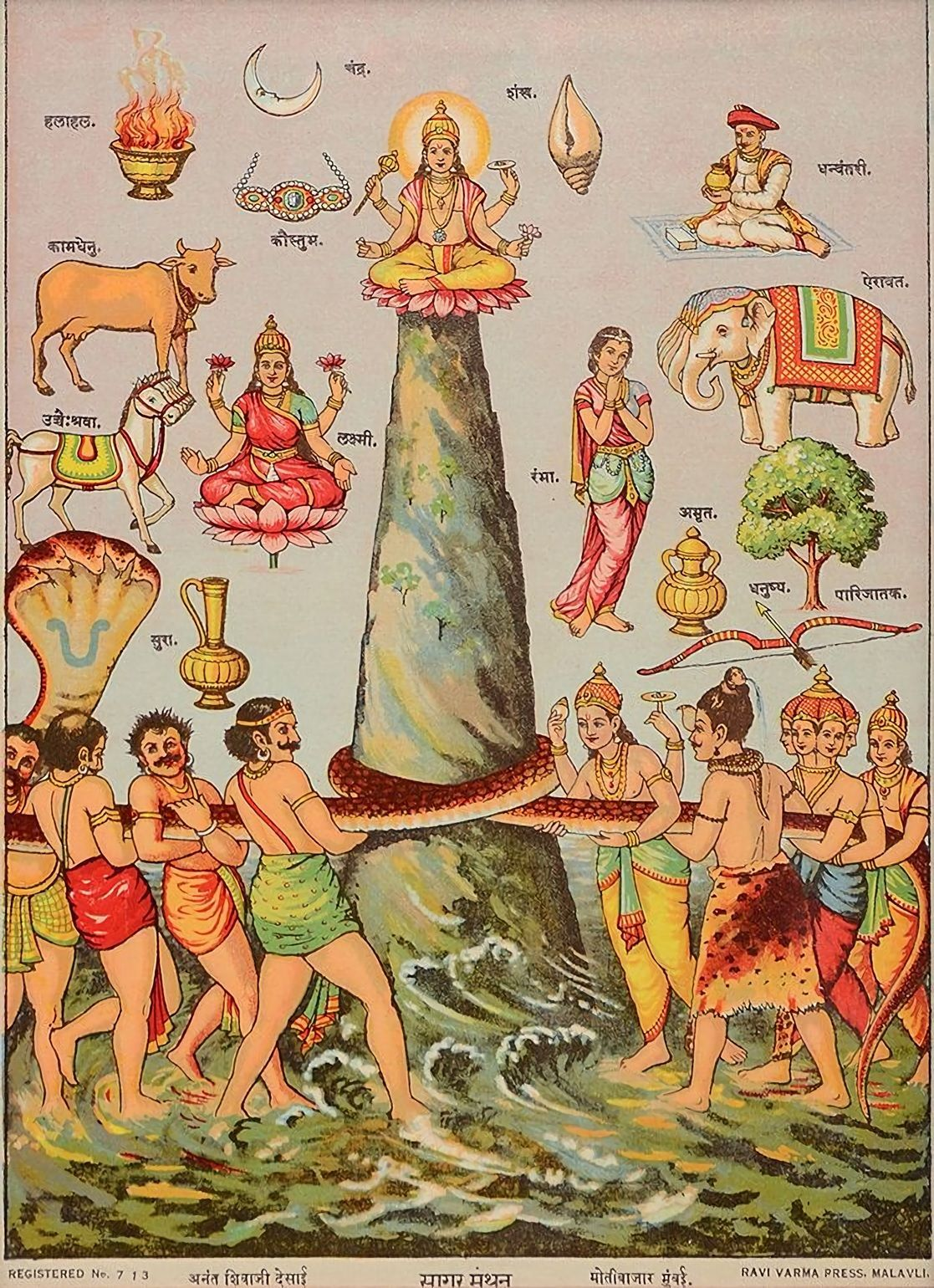
A pot (kumbha) containing Amrita was one of the products of the Samudra Manthana.

Hindus believe that the Kumbh Mela originated in times immemorial and is attested in the Hindu Puranas about Samudra Manthana (lit. churning of the ocean) found in the Puranas. Historians, in contrast, reject these claims as none of the ancient or medieval era texts that mention the Samudra Manthana legend ever link it to a "mela" or festival. According to Giorgio Bonazzoli, a scholar of Sanskrit Puranas, these are anachronistic explanations, an adaptation of early legends to a later practice by a "small circle of adherents" who have sought the roots of a highly popular pilgrimage and festival.

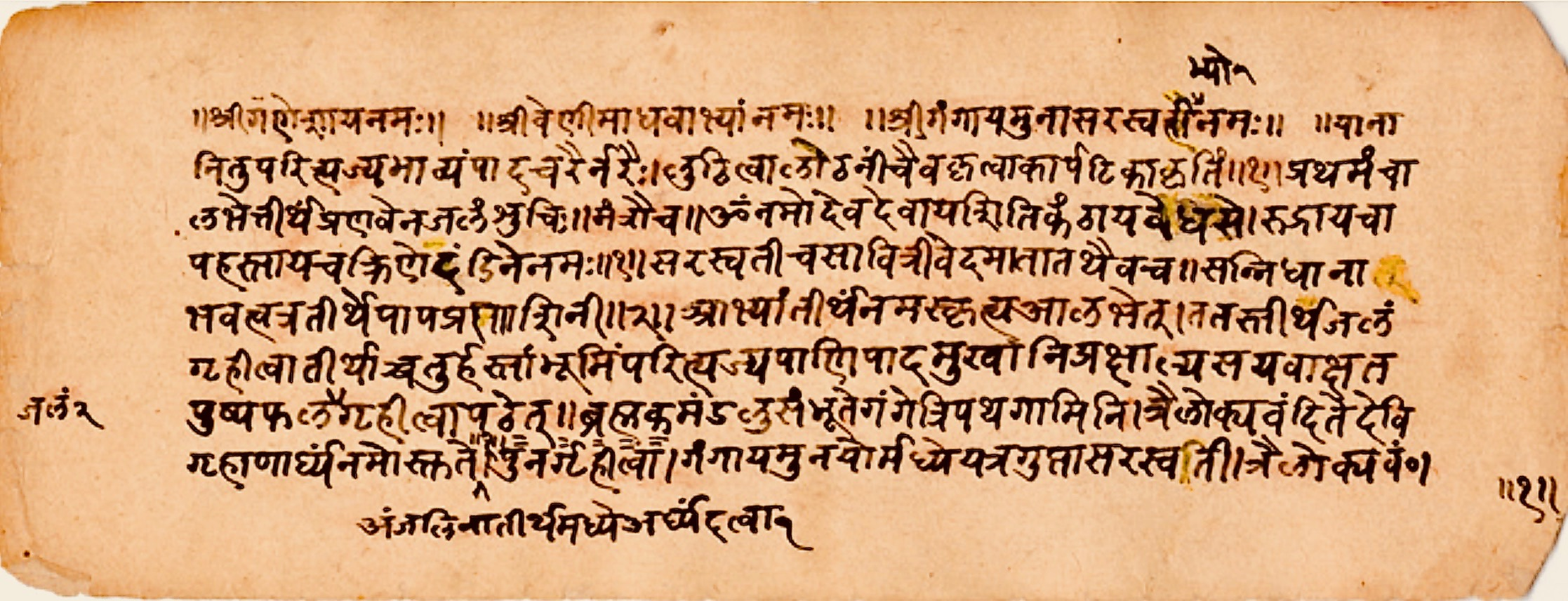
The first page of Prayag Snana Vidhi manuscript (Sanskrit, Devanagari script). It describes methods to complete a bathing pilgrimage at Prayag. The manuscript (1674 CE) has a colophon, which states "Copied by Sarvottama, son of Vishvanatha Bhatta, Samvat 1752".

Hindu mythology describes the creation of a "pot of amrita (nectar of immortality)" after the forces of good and evil churn the ocean of creation. The gods and demons fight over this pot, the "kumbha", of nectar in order to gain immortality. In a later day extension to the legend, the pot is spilt at four places, and that is the origin of the four Kumbha Melas. The story varies, with some stating Vishnu as Mohini avatar, others stating Dhanavantari or Garuda or Indra spilling the pot. This "spilling" and associated Kumbh Mela story is not found in the earliest mentions of the original legend of Samudra Manthana (churning of the ocean) such as the Vedic era texts (pre-500 BCE), or the earliest of the Puranas (3rd to 10th-century CE).

While the Kumbha Mela phrase is not found in the ancient or medieval era texts, numerous chapters and verses in Hindu texts are found about a bathing festival, the sacred junction of rivers Ganga, Yamuna and sacred Saraswati at Prayag, and pilgrimage to Prayag. These are in the form of Snana (bathe) ritual and in the form of Prayag Mahatmya (greatness of Prayag, historical tour guides in Sanskrit).

== History ==
The first Kumbh Mela event was organised in 1870, under British supervision. Some observers have found similarities between Kumbh Mela and other events that took place in the earlier times.

A mention of Prayaga and the bathing pilgrimage is found in Rigveda Pariśiṣṭa (supplement to the Rigveda). It is also mentioned in the Pali canons of Buddhism, such as in section 1.7 of Majjhima Nikaya, wherein the Buddha states that bathing in Payaga (Skt: Prayaga) cannot wash away cruel and evil deeds, rather the virtuous one should be pure in heart and fair in action. The Mahabharata mentions a bathing pilgrimage at Prayag as a means of prāyaścitta (atonement, penance) for past mistakes and guilt. In Tirthayatra Parva, before the great war, the epic states "the one who observes firm [ethical] vows, having bathed at Prayaga during Magha, O best of the Bharatas, becomes spotless and reaches heaven." In Anushasana Parva, after the war, the epic elaborates this bathing pilgrimage as "geographical tirtha" that must be combined with Manasa-tirtha (tirtha of the heart) whereby one lives by values such as truth, charity, self-control, patience and others.

There are other references to Prayaga and river-side festivals in ancient Indian texts, including at the places where present-day Kumbh Melas are held, but the exact age of the Kumbh Mela is uncertain. The 7th-century Buddhist Chinese traveller Xuanzang (Hiuen Tsang) mentions king Harsha and his capital of Prayag, which he states to be a sacred Hindu city with hundreds of "deva temples" and two Buddhist institutions. He also mentions the Hindu bathing rituals at the junction of the rivers. According to some scholars, this is the earliest surviving historical account of the Kumbh Mela, which took place in present-day Prayag in 644 CE.

Some traditions ascribe Kumbha Mela's origins to the 8th CE philosopher Shankara as a part of his efforts to start major Hindu gatherings for philosophical discussions and debates along with Hindu monasteries across the Indian subcontinent.

Kama MacLean, an Indologist who has published articles on the Kumbh Mela predominantly based on the colonial archives and English-language media, states based on emails from other scholars and a more recent interpretation of the 7th-century Xuanzang memoir, the Prayag event happened every 5 years (and not 12 years), featured a Buddha statue, involved alms giving and it might have been a Buddhist festival. In contrast, Ariel Glucklich – a scholar of Hinduism and Anthropology of Religion, the Xuanzang memoir includes, somewhat derisively, the reputation of Prayag as a place where people (Hindus) once committed superstitious devotional suicide to liberate their souls, and how a Brahmin of an earlier era successfully put an end to this practice. This and other details such as the names of temples and bathing pools suggest that Xuanzang presented Hindu practices at Prayag in the 7th century, from his Buddhist perspective and perhaps to "amuse his audience back in China", states Glucklich.

Other early accounts of the significance of Prayag to Hinduism are found in the various versions of the Prayaga Mahatmya, dated to the late 1st millennium CE. These Purana-genre Hindu texts describe it as a place "bustling with pilgrims, priests, vendors, beggars, guides" and local citizens busy along the confluence of the rivers (Sangam). These Sanskrit guide books of the medieval era India were updated over its editions, likely by priests and guides who had a mutual stake in the economic returns from the visiting pilgrims. One of the longest sections about Prayag rivers and their significance to Hindu pilgrimage is found in chapters 103–112 of the Matsya Purana.

=== Evolution of earlier melas to Kumbh Melas ===
Exceedingly old pilgrimage
There is evidence enough to suggest that although the Magh Mela – or at least, the tradition of religious festival at the triveni [Prayag] – is exceedingly old, the Kumbh Mela at Allahabad is much more recent.

— Maclean (2008), p. 91

Some observers have found similarities between Kumbh Mela and other events that took place in the earlier times.

According to James Lochtefeld – a scholar of Indian religions, the phrase Kumbh Mela and historical data about it is missing in early Indian texts. However, states Lochtefeld, these historical texts "clearly reveal large, well-established bathing festivals" that were either annual or based on the twelve-year cycle of planet Jupiter. Manuscripts related to Hindu ascetics and warrior-monks – akharas fighting the Islamic Sultanates and Mughal Empire era – mention bathing pilgrimage and a large periodic assembly of Hindus at religious festivals associated with bathing, gift-giving, commerce and organisation. An early account of the Haridwar Kumbh Mela was published by Captain Thomas Hardwicke in 1796 CE.

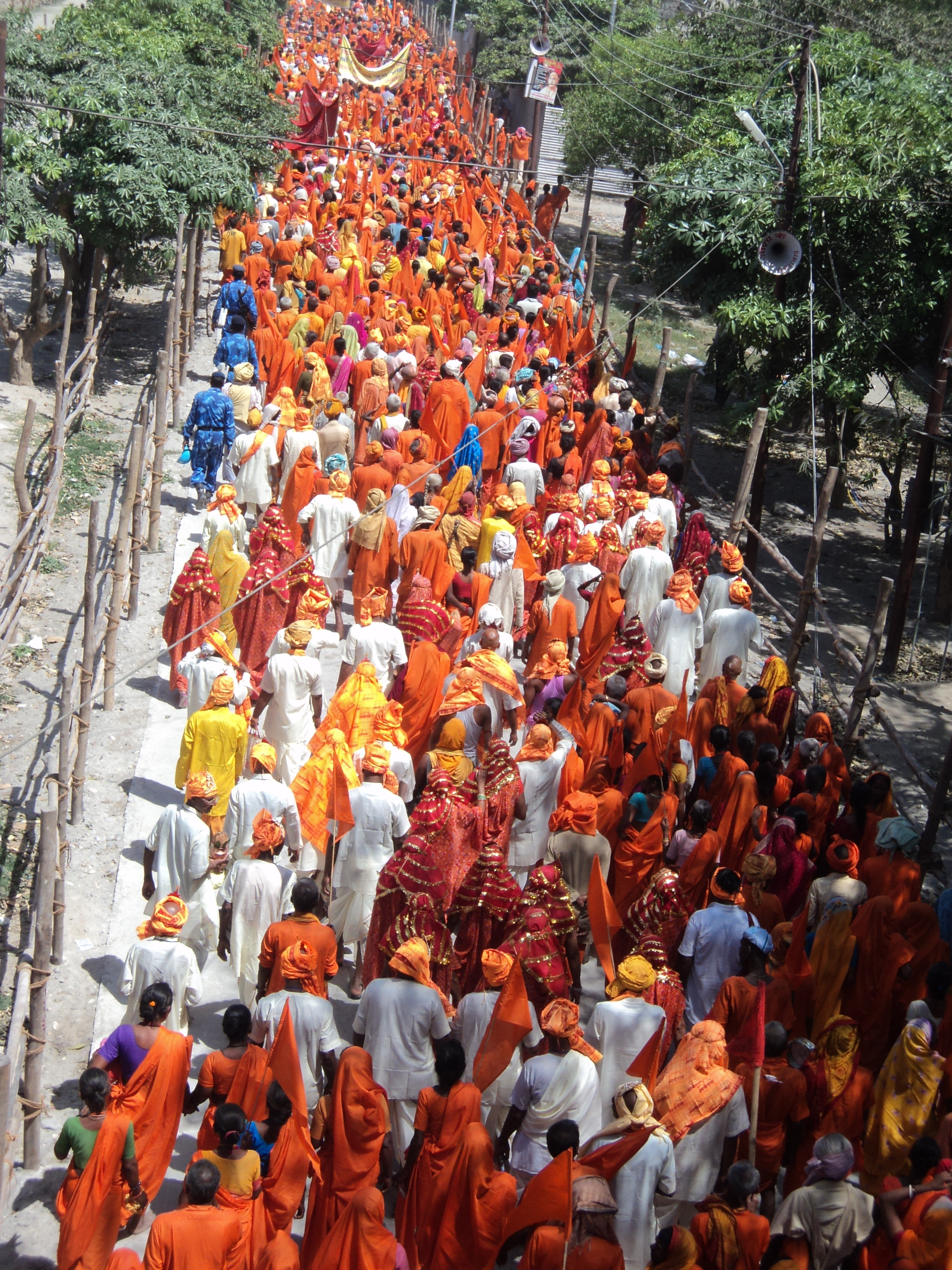
Hindu pilgrims heading to the Kumbh Mela site

According to James Mallinson – a scholar of Hindu yoga manuscripts and monastic institutions, bathing festivals at Prayag with large gatherings of pilgrims are attested since "at least the middle of the first millennium CE", while textual evidence exists for similar pilgrimage at other major sacred rivers since the medieval period. Four of these morphed under the Kumbh Mela brand during the East India Company rule (British colonial era) when it sought to control the war-prone monks and the lucrative tax and trade revenues at these Hindu pilgrimage festivals. Additionally, the priests sought the British administration to recognise the festival and protect their religious rights.

The 16th-century Ramcharitmanas of Tulsidas mentions an annual Mela in Prayag, as does a Muslim historian's Ain-i-Akbari (c. 1590 CE). The latter Akbar-era Persian text calls Prayag (spells it Priyag) the "king of shrines" for the Hindus, and mentions that it is considered particularly holy in the Hindu month of Magha. The late 16th-century Tabaqat-i-Akbari also records of an annual bathing festival at Prayag Sangam where "various classes of Hindus came from all sides of the country to bathe, in such numbers, that the jungles and plains [around it] were unable to hold them".

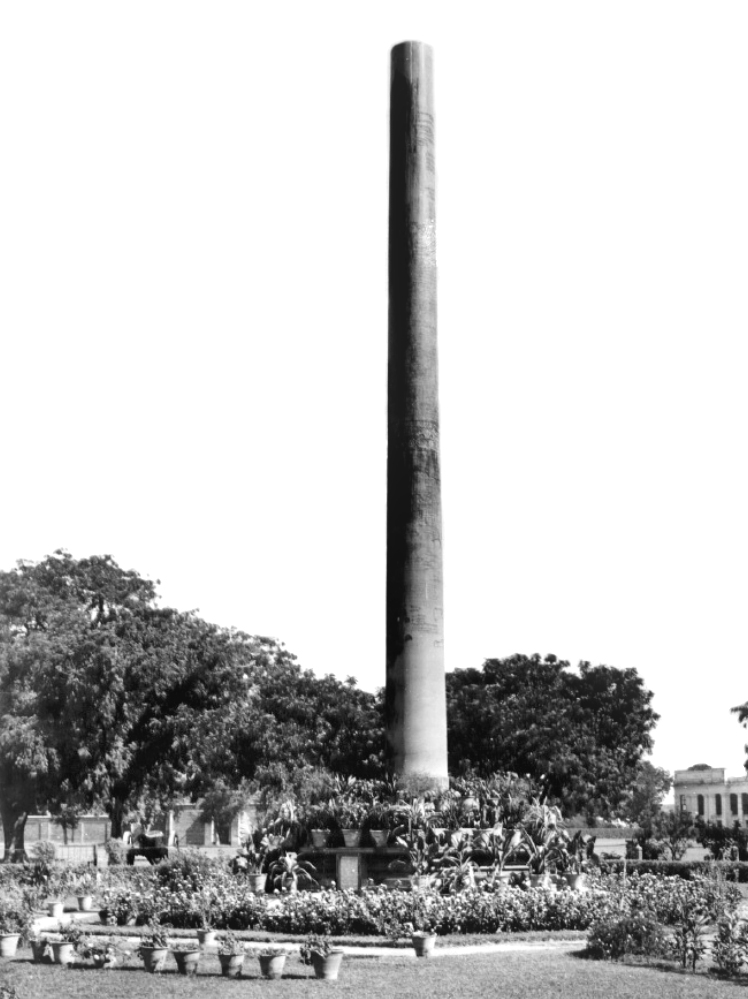
The Ashoka pillar (photo c. 1900) contains many inscriptions since the 3rd century BCE. Sometime about 1575 CE, Birbal of Akbar's era added an inscription that mentions the "Magh mela at Prayag Tirth Raj".

The Kumbh Mela of Haridwar appears to be the original Kumbh Mela, since it is held according to the astrological sign "Kumbha" (Aquarius), and because there are several references to a 12-year cycle for it. The later Mughal Empire era texts that contain the term "Kumbha Mela" in Haridwar's context include Khulasat-ut-Tawarikh (1695–1699 CE), and Chahar Gulshan (1759 CE). The Khulasat-ut-Tawarikh also mentions an annual bathing pilgrimage festival in Prayag, but it does not call it Kumbh. Both these Mughal era texts use the term "Kumbh Mela" to describe only Haridwar's fair, mentioning a similar fair held in Prayag and Nashik. The Khulasat-ut-Tawarikh lists the following melas: an annual mela and a Kumbh Mela every 12 years at Haridwar; a mela held at Trimbak when Jupiter enters Leo (that is, once in 12 years); and an annual mela held at Prayag (in modern Prayagraj) in Magh.

Like the Prayag mela, the bathing pilgrimage mela at Nasik and Ujjain are of considerable antiquity. However, these were referred to as Singhasth mela, and the phrase "Kumbh mela" is yet to be found in literature prior to the 19th century. The phrases such as "Maha Kumbh" and "Ardh Kumbh" in the context of the ancient religious pilgrimage festivals with different names at Prayag, Nasik and Ujjain are evidently of a more modern era.

The Magh Mela of Prayag is probably the oldest among the four modern-day Kumbh Melas. It dates from the early centuries CE, given it has been mentioned in several early Puranas. However, the name Kumbh for these more ancient bathing pilgrimages probably dates to the mid-19th century. D. P. Dubey states that none of the ancient Hindu texts call the Prayag fair a "Kumbh Mela". Kama Maclean states that the early British records do not mention the name "Kumbh Mela" or the 12-year cycle for the Prayag fair. The first British reference to the Kumbh Mela in Prayag occurs only in an 1868 report, which mentions the need for increased pilgrimage and sanitation controls at the "Coomb fair" to be held in January 1870. According to Maclean, the Prayagwal Brahmin priests of Prayag coopted the Kumbh legend and brand to the annual Prayag Magh Mela given the socio-political circumstances in the 19th century.

The Kumbh Mela at Ujjain began in the 18th century when the Maratha ruler Ranoji Shinde invited ascetics from Nashik to Ujjain for a local festival. Like the priests at Prayag, those at Nashik and Ujjain, competing with other places for a sacred status, may have adopted the Kumbh tradition for their pre-existing Magha melas.

=== Akharas: Warrior monks, recruitment drive and logistics ===
One of the key features of the Kumbh Mela has been the camps and processions of the sadhus (monks). By the 18th century, many of these had organised into one of thirteen akharas (warrior ascetic bands, monastic militia), of which ten were related to Hinduism and three related to Sikhism. Seven have belonged to the Shaivism tradition, three to Vaishnavism, two to Udasis (founded by Guru Nanak's son) and one to Nirmalas. These soldier-monk traditions have been a well-established feature of the Indian society, and they are prominent feature of the Kumbh melas.

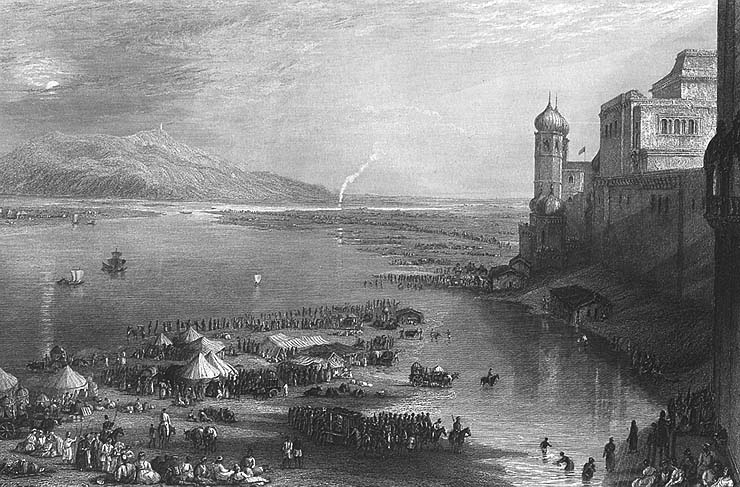
Haridwar Kumbh Mela by the English painter J. M. W. Turner. Steel engraving, c. 1850s.

Until the East India Company rule, the Kumbh Melas (Magha Melas) were managed by these akharas. They provided logistical arrangements, and policing, intervened and judged any disputes and collected taxes. They also have been a central attraction and a stop for mainstream Hindus who seek their darsana (meeting, view) as well as spiritual guidance and blessings. The Kumbh Melas have been one of their recruitment and initiation venues, as well as the place to trade. These akharas have roots in the Hindu Naga (naked) monks tradition, who went to war without clothes. These monastic groups traditionally credit the Kumbh mela to the 8th-century Hindu philosopher Adi Shankara, as a part of his efforts to start monastic institutions (matha), and major Hindu gatherings for philosophical discussions and debates. However, there is no historical literary evidence that he actually did start the Kumbh melas.

During the 17th century, the akharas competed for ritual primacy, priority rights to who bathes first or at the most auspicious time, and prominence leading to violent conflicts. The records from the East India Company rule era report of violence between the akharas and numerous deaths. At the 1760 Kumbh Mela in Haridwar, a clash broke out between Shaivite Gosains and Vaishnavite Bairagis (ascetics), resulting in hundreds of deaths. A copper plate inscription of the Maratha Peshwa claims that 12,000 ascetics died in a clash between Shaivite sanyasis and Vaishnavite bairagis at the 1789 Nashik Kumbh Mela. The dispute started over the bathing order, which then indicated the status of the akharas. At the 1796 Kumbh Mela in Haridwar, violence broke out between the Shaivites and the Udasis on logistics and camping rights.

The repetitive clashes, battle-ready nature of the warrior monks, and the lucrative tax and trading opportunities at Kumbh melas in the 18th century attracted the attention of the East India Company officials. They intervened, laid out the camps, trading spaces, and established a bathing order for each akhara. After 1947, the state governments have taken over this role and provide the infrastructure for the Kumbh Mela in their respective states. The first Kumbh Mela event under British supervision was organised in 1870.

The Kumbh Melas attract many loner sadhus (monks) who do not belong to any akharas. Of those who do belong to a group, the thirteen active akharas have been,

- 7 Shaiva akharas: (Note: They are also called Gosains.) Mahanirvani, Atal, Niranjani, Anand, Juna, Avahan, and Agni
- 3 Vaishnava akharas: (Note: They are also called Bairagis.) Nirvani, Digamb

== Significance and impact ==
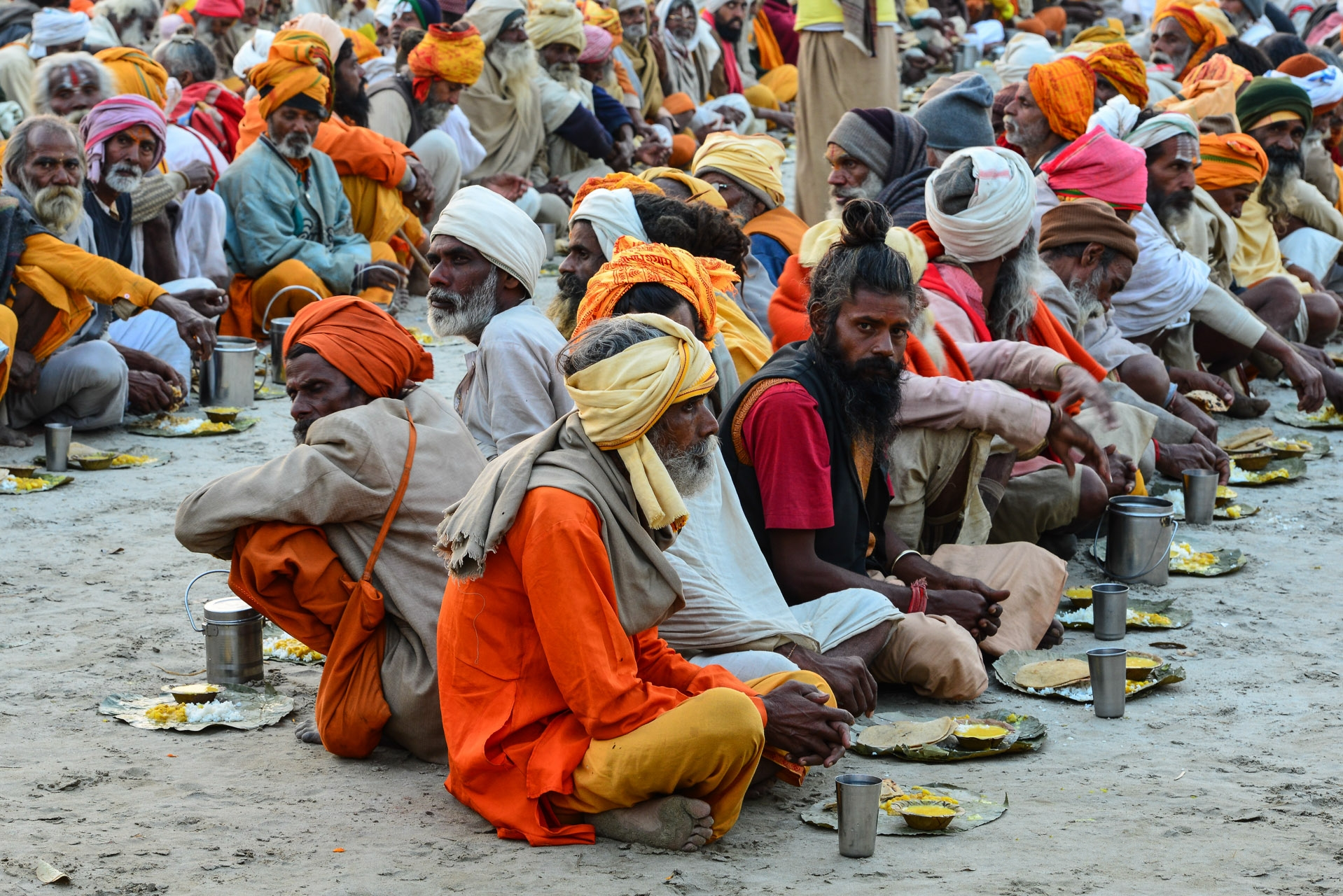
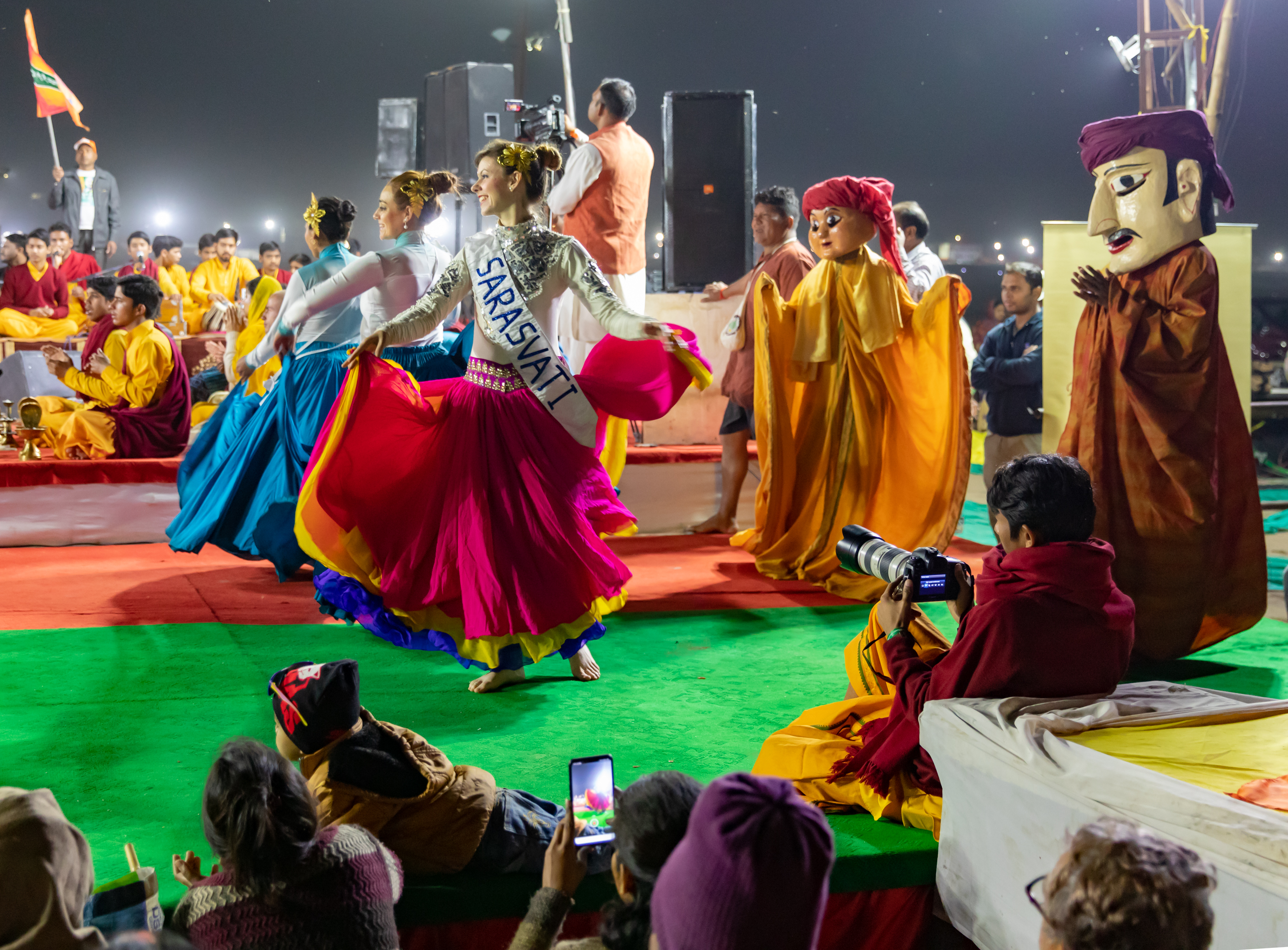
Kumbh Melas feature many trade, fairs, charity, community singing, religious recitations, and entertainment spectacles. Left: Anna Dāna event at Prayag Kumbh, feeding monks and poor; Right: A dance performance.

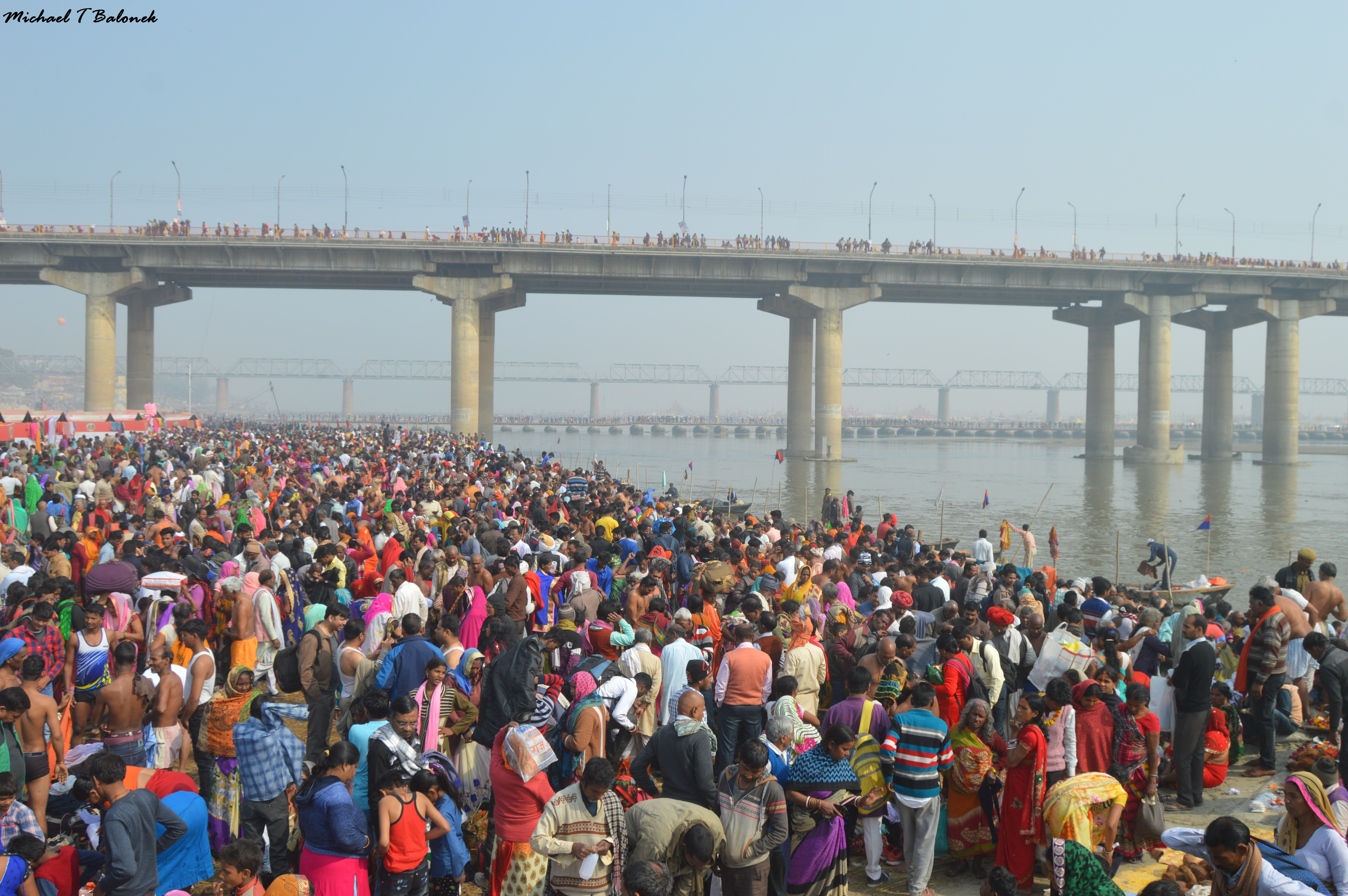
Large crowds at the Ganga (Ganges) on a major bathing day in the 2019 Kumbh Mela

The Kumbh Melas of the past, albeit with different regional names, attracted large attendance and have been religiously significant to the Hindus for centuries. They have included initiation of followers to the akharas, discourses of religious leaders, and religious music. The 1834 Islamic encyclopaedia Yadgar-i-Bahaduri written in Lucknow described the Prayag festival and its sanctity to the Hindus. It is also financially significant.

Officials of the East India Company saw the Hindu pilgrimage as a means to collect large sums of revenue through a "pilgrim tax" and taxes on the trade that occurred during the festival. The British officials raised the tax to amount greater than average monthly income and the attendance fell drastically. The Prayagwal pandas resisted as the impact of the religious tax on the pilgrims became clear. According to colonial records, they had originally supported the tax; since the records of the Prayag Mela during this period were written by colonialists and missionaries, Macclean argues that they present a biased materialistic view.

Baptist missionary John Chamberlain, who visited the 1824 Ardh Kumbh Mela at Haridwar, stated that a large number of visitors came there for trade. He also includes a 1814 letter from his missionary friend who distributed copies of the Gospel to the pilgrims and tried to convert some to Christianity. According to an 1858 account of the Haridwar Kumbh Mela by the British civil servant Robert Montgomery Martin, the visitors at the fair included people from a number of races and clime. Along with priests, soldiers, and religious mendicants, the fair had horse traders from Bukhara, Kabul, Turkistan as well as Arabs and Persians. The festival had roadside merchants of food grains, confectioners, clothes, toys and other items. Thousands of pilgrims in every form of transport as well as on foot marched to the pilgrimage site, dressed in colourful costumes, some without clothes, occasionally shouting "Mahadeo Bol" and "Bol, Bol" together. At night the river banks and camps illuminated with oil lamps, fireworks burst over the river, and innumerable floating lamps set by the pilgrims drifted downstream of the river. Several Hindu rajas, Sikh rulers and Muslim Nawabs visited the fair. Europeans watched the crowds and few Christian missionaries distributed their religious literature at the Hardwar Mela, wrote Martin.

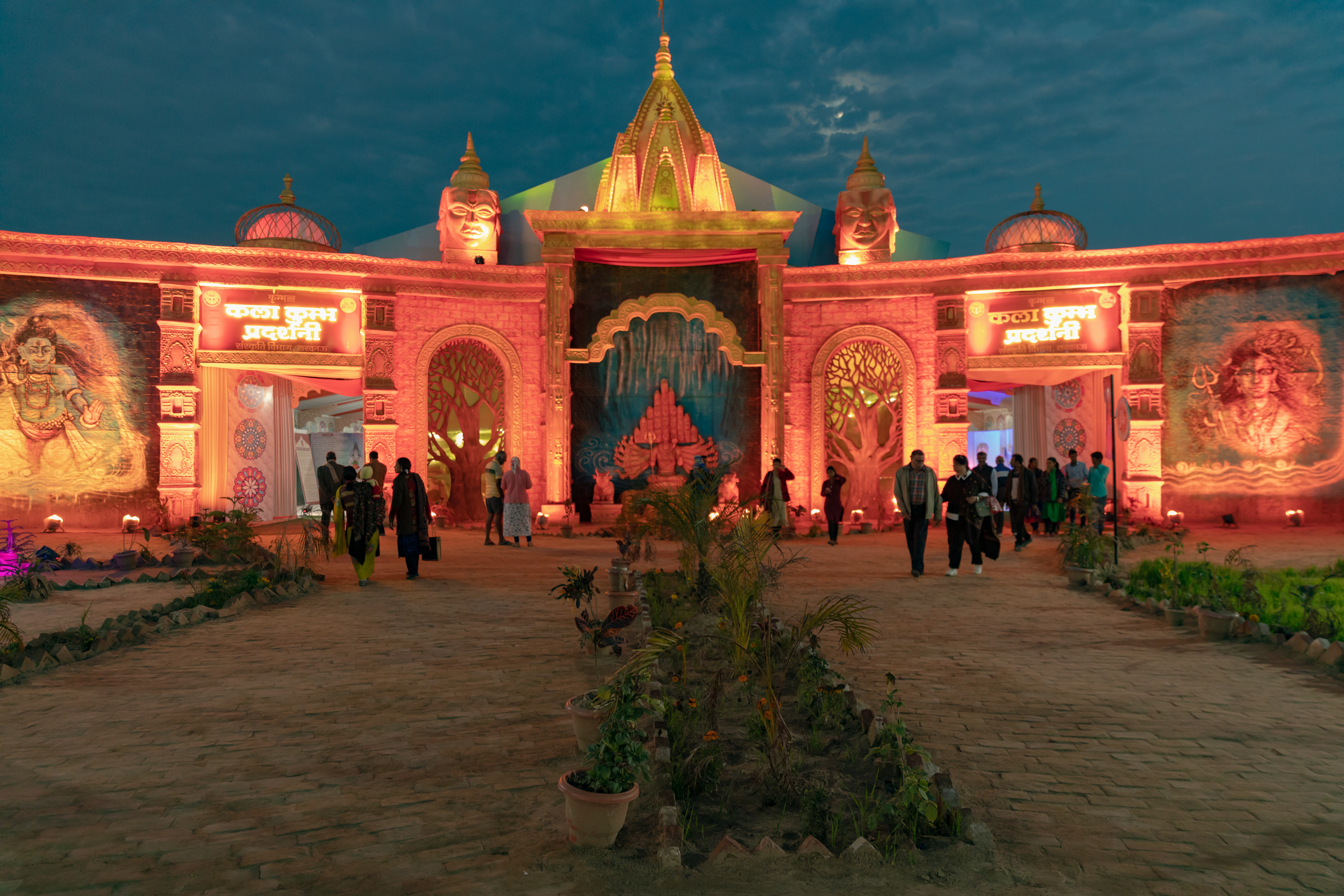
A cultural program pandal at Prayag Kumbh Mela (2019)

Prior to 1838, British officials collected taxes but provided no infrastructure or services to the pilgrims. This changed particularly after 1857. According to Amna Khalid, the Kumbh Melas emerged as one of the social and political mobilisation venues and the colonial government became keen on monitoring these developments after the Indian rebellion of 1857. The government deployed police to gain this intelligence at the grassroots level of Kumbh Mela. The British officials in co-operation with the native police also made attempts to improve the infrastructure, and movement of pilgrims to avoid a stampede, detect sickness, and the sanitary conditions at the Melas. Reports of cholera led the officials to cancel the pilgrimage, but the pilgrims went on "passive resistance" and stated they preferred to die rather than obey the official orders. Mark Twain also visited Kumbh Mela of Prayagraj in 1895 for which he wrote:

The positive impact of kumbh mela is this festival helps preserve cultural traditions and promotes the values of spirituality, unity, and devotion.

It is wonderful, the power of a faith like that, that can make multitudes upon multitudes of the old and weak and the young and frail enter without hesitation or complaint upon incredible journeys and endure the resultant miseries without repining.

In 1938, Lord Auckland abolished the pilgrim tax, after which the number of pilgrims increased.

=== 1857 rebellion and the Independence movement ===
According to the colonial archives, the Prayagwal community associated with the Kumbh Mela were one of those who seeded and perpetuated the resistance and 1857 rebellion against the colonial rule. Prayagwals objected to and campaigned against the colonial government-supported Christian missionaries and officials who treated them and the pilgrims as "ignorant co-religionists" and those who aggressively tried to convert the Hindu pilgrims to a Christian sect. During the 1857 rebellion, Colonel Neill targeted the Kumbh Mela site and shelled the region where the Prayagwals lived, destroying it in what Maclean describes as a "notoriously brutal pacification of Allahabad". In response, the Prayagwals targeted and destroyed the local mission press and churches. Once the British had regained control of the region, the Prayagwals were persecuted by colonial officials. Some were convicted and hanged, while others for whom the government did not have proof enough to convict were persecuted. Large tracts of Kumbh Mela lands near the Ganga-Yamuna confluence were confiscated and annexed into the government cantonment. In the years after 1857, the Prayagwals and the Kumbh Mela pilgrim crowds carried flags with images alluding to the rebellion and the racial persecution. The British media reported these pilgrim assemblies and protests at the later Kumbh Mela as strangely "hostile" and with "disbelief." The Kumbh Mela continued to play an important role in the independence movement through 1947, as a place where the native people and politicians periodically gathered in large numbers. In 1906, the Sanatan Dharm Sabha met at the Prayag Kumbh Mela and resolved to start the Banaras Hindu University in Madan Mohan Malaviya's leadership. Kumbh Melas have also been one of the hubs for the Hindutva movement and politics. In 1964, the Vishva Hindu Parishad was founded at the Haridwar Kumbh Mela.

=== Rising attendance and scale ===
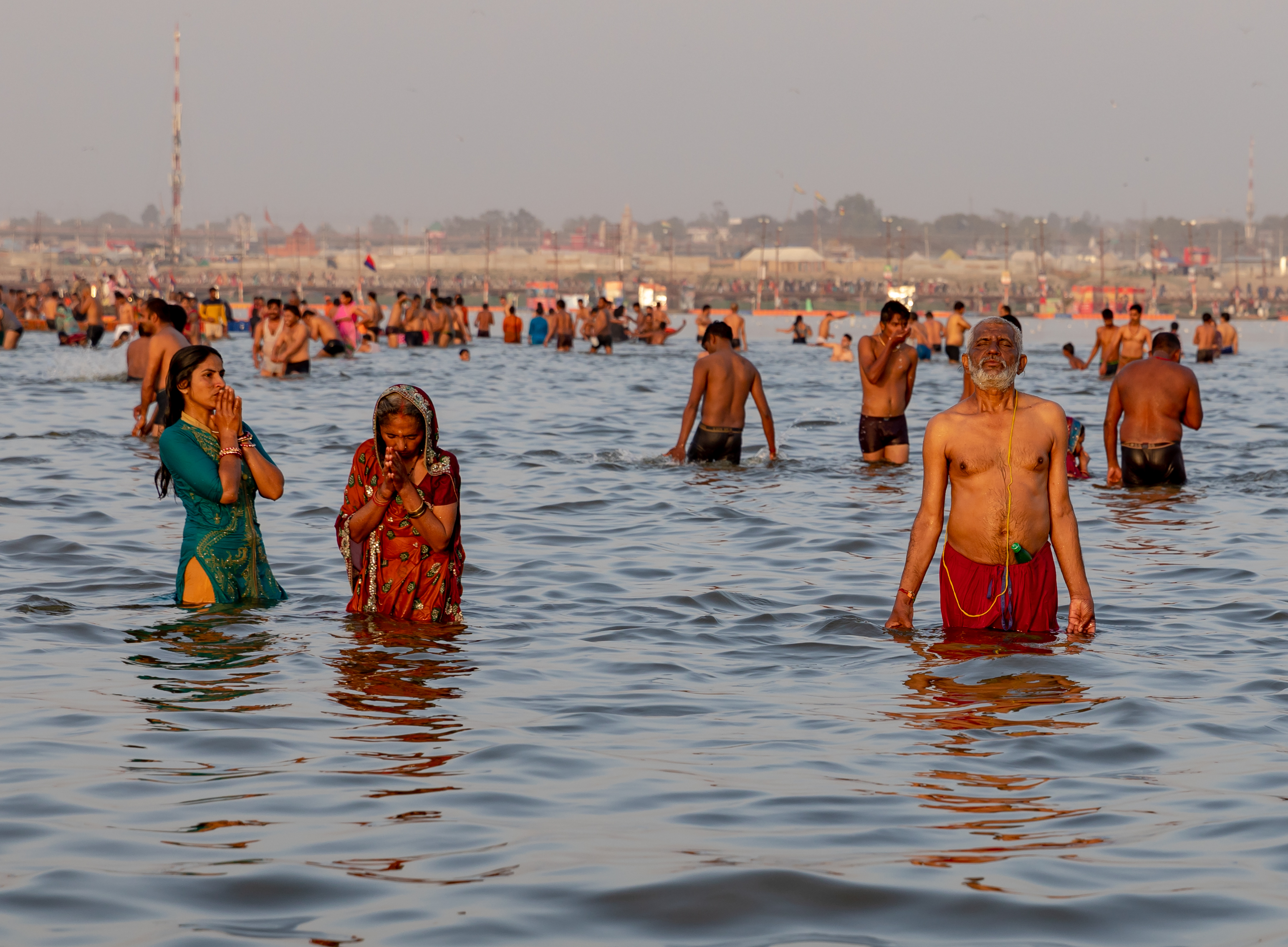
Kumbh Mela – a dip in the waters is one of the key rituals

The historical and modern estimates of attendance vary greatly between sources. For example, the colonial era Imperial Gazetteer of India reported that between 2 and 2.5 million pilgrims attended the Kumbh Mela in 1796 and 1808, then added these numbers may be exaggerations. Between 1892 and 1908, in an era of major famines, cholera and plague epidemics in British India, the pilgrimage dropped to between 300,000 and 400,000.

During World War II, the colonial government banned the Kumbh Mela to conserve scarce supplies of fuel. The ban, coupled with false rumours that Japan planned to bomb and commit genocide at the Kumbh Mela site, led to sharply lower attendance at the 1942 Kumbh Mela than in prior decades when an estimated 2 to 4 million pilgrims gathered at each Kumbh mela. After India's independence, the attendance rose sharply. On amavasya – one of the three key bathing dates, over 5 million attended the 1954 Kumbh, about 10 million attended the 1977 Kumbh while the 1989 Kumbh attracted about 15 million.

On 14 April 1998, 10 million pilgrims attended the Kumbh Mela at Haridwar on the busiest single day, according to the Himalayan Academy editors. In 2001, IKONOS satellite images confirmed a very large human gathering, with officials estimating 70 million people over the festival, including more than 40 million on the busiest single day according to BBC News. Another estimate states that about 30 million attended the 2001 Kumbh mela on the busiest mauni amavasya day alone.

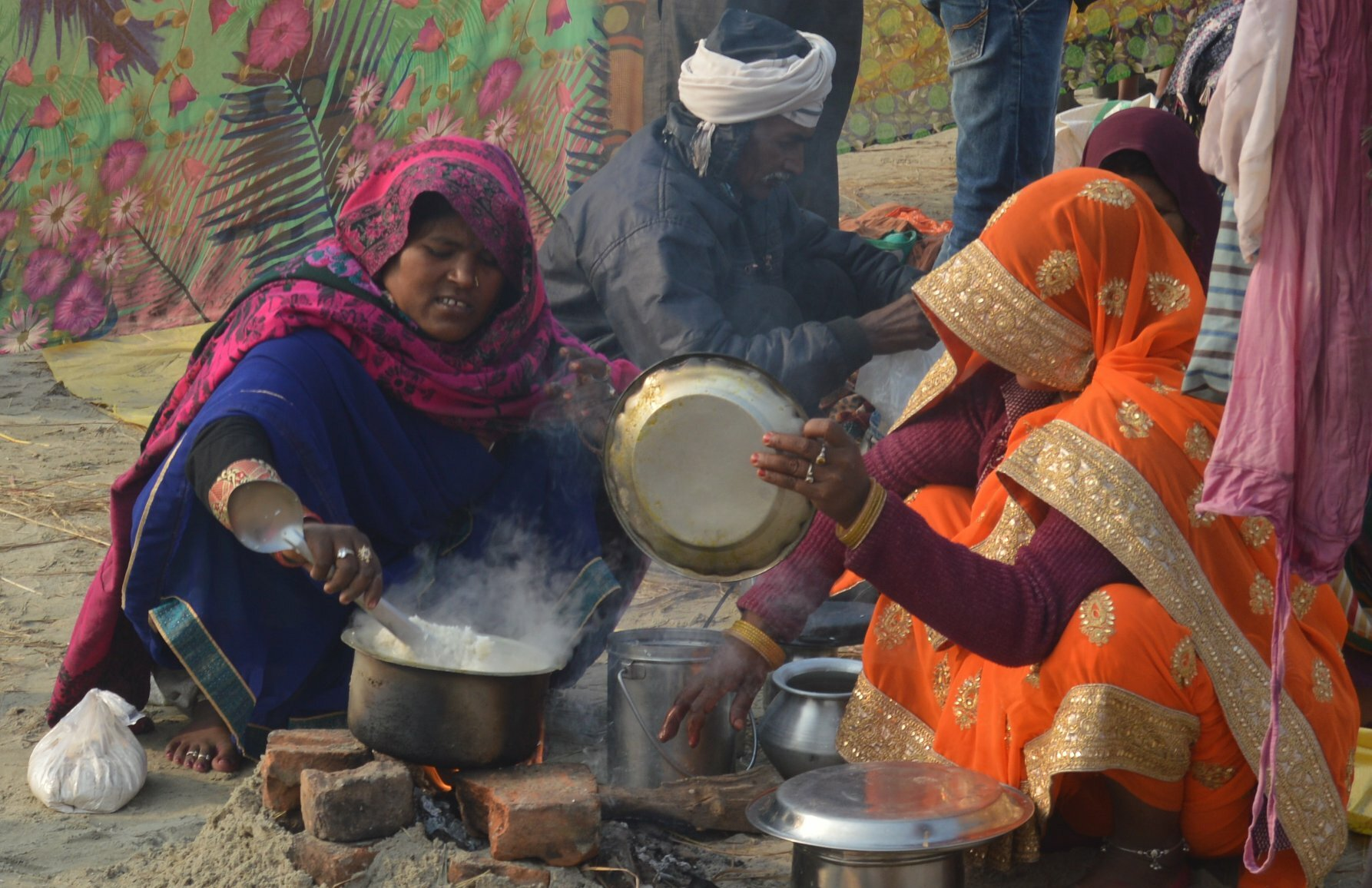
Cooking at Kumbh Mela in 2019

The Kumbh Mela is "widely regarded as the world's largest religious gathering", states James Lochtefeld. The Maha Kumbh at Prayagraj is the largest such event in the world by attendance and scale which has been increasing with each successive event. In 2007, as many as 70 million pilgrims attended the 45-day-long Ardha Kumbh Mela at Prayagraj. In 2013, 120 million pilgrims attended the Kumbh Mela at Prayagraj. For the 2019 Ardh Kumbh at Prayagraj, the preparations included the construction of a ₹42,000 million (equivalent to ₹57 billion or US$610 million in 2026) temporary city over 2,500 hectares with 122,000 temporary toilets and range of accommodation, more than 800 special trains by the Indian Railways, and other facilities including artificially intelligent video surveillance, disease surveillance, and river transport management. The 2025 Prayag Maha Kumbh Mela, held from 13 January to 26 February 2025, which coincided with a rare planetary alignment occurring once every 144 years, attracted more than 660 million pilgrims, making it the largest human gathering on record.

According to Kama Maclean, the coordinators and attendees themselves state that a part of the glory of the Kumbh festival is in that "feeling of brotherhood and love" where millions peacefully gather on the river banks in harmony and a sense of shared heritage. In modern religious and psychological theory, the Kumbh Mela exemplifies Émile Durkheim's concept of collective effervescence. This phenomenon occurs when individuals gather in shared rituals, fostering a profound sense of unity and belonging.

Stampedes and controversies

Several stampedes have occurred at the sites related to the Kumbh Melas. After an 1820 stampede at Haridwar killed 485 people, the Company government took extensive infrastructure projects, including the construction of new ghats and road widening, to prevent further stampedes. The various Kumbh melas, in the 19th- and 20th century witnessed sporadic stampedes, each tragedy leading to changes in how the flow of pilgrims to and from the river and ghats was managed. In a major crowd crush, over 500 people died in the 1954 Kumbh Mela stampede, although the real figure varies according to different sources. In 1986, 50 people were killed in a stampede. On 27 August 2003, 39 pilgrims were killed and more than 100 injured in a crowd crush at the Kumbh Mela in Nashik, when barricades gave way in a narrow lane near the Kalaram Temple as crowds headed to the Godavari to bathe. The 2025 event was marred by a crowd crush on 29 January 2025 that killed at least 30 people, prompting a judicial inquiry by the Uttar Pradesh government.

During the Prayag Kumbh Mela in 1885, a Muslim named Husain was appointed as the manager of the event, and Indian newspaper reports stated that Husain "organised a flotilla of festooned boats for the pleasure of European ladies and gentlemen, and entertained them with dancing girls, liquor and beef" as they watched the pilgrims bathing.

The Kumbh Mela held in Haridwar in 2021 was considered a COVID-19 super spreader, contributing to increased cases in Uttarakhand and India, as the number of pilgrims visiting the area grew and numerous health guidelines were violated. As the second wave was increasing infections in India, calls to cancel the festival were rejected by the state and central government which assured the festival was clean and safe.

In January 2025, 30–79 people died and 60–90 were injured and taken to hospital in the stampede at the Maha Kumbh venue in Prayagraj, and Amrit Snan was temporarily suspended. It was announced that a judicial enquiry by a three-member committee would be conducted, led by Justice Harsh Kumar. The provincial government initially said that there had been 30 killed and 60 injured, and never revised that figure, but later media investigations suggested a higher number of fatalities and a potential coverup.

== Calendar, locations and preparation ==
=== Types ===
The Kumbh Mela are classified as:

- The Purna ("full") Kumbh Melas, which are held every 12 years at a given site.
- The Ardh ("half") Kumbh Mela held approximately every 6 years between the two Purna Kumbha Melas at Prayagraj and Haridwar.

For the 2019 Prayagraj Kumbh Mela, the Uttar Pradesh Chief Minister Yogi Adityanath announced that the Ardh Kumbh Mela (organised every 6 years) will simply be known as "Kumbh Mela", and the Kumbh Mela (organised every 12 years) will be known as "Maha Kumbh Mela" ("Great Kumbh Mela"). The term Maha Kumbh Mela has also been used to publicise certain kumbha melas that are said to have had astrological attributes that would not be repeated for another 144 years, including the ones in 1954, 1989, 2001, and 2025.

=== Locations ===
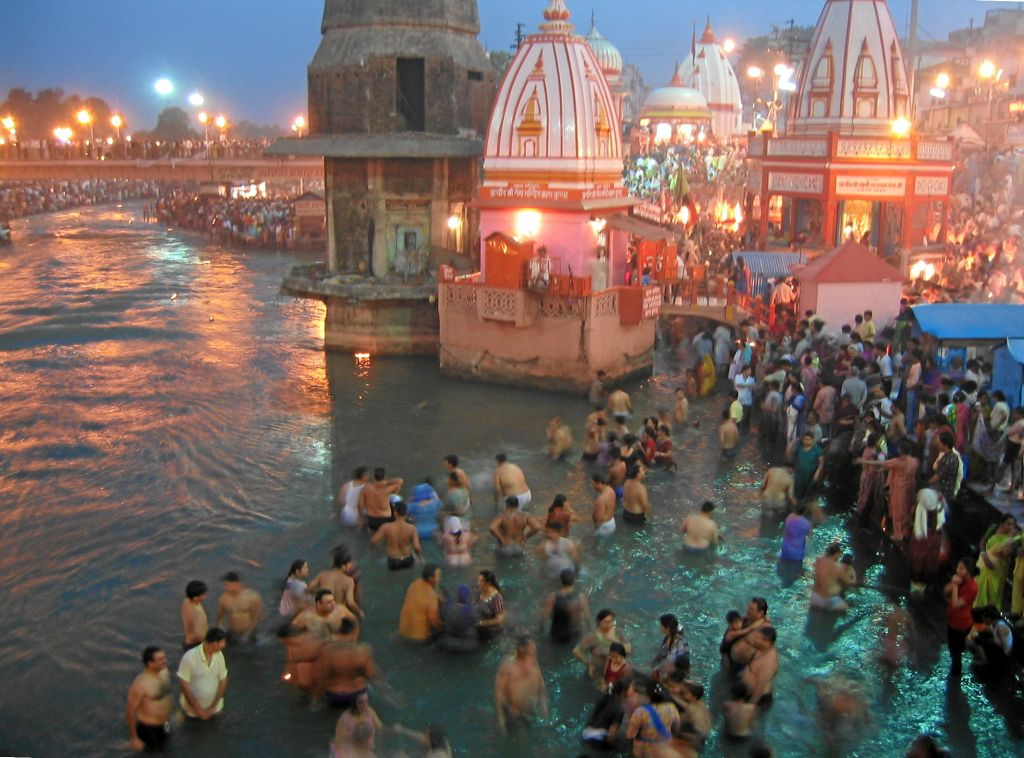
Kumbh Mela at Haridwar

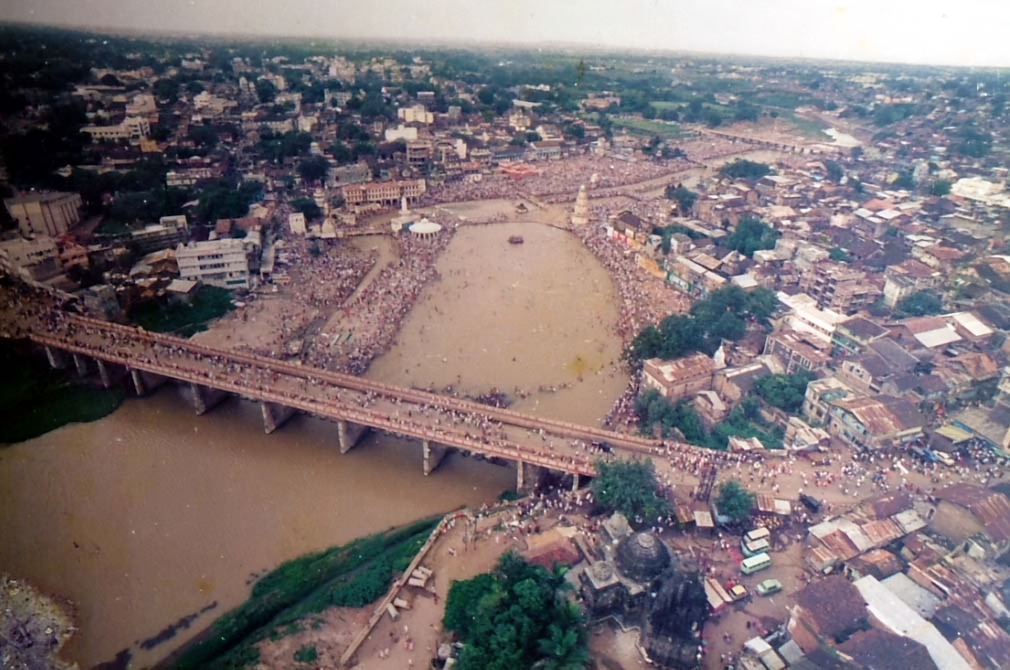
Nashik-Trimbakeshwar Simhastha in the Godavari River in 1992

The fairs held at four sites are broadly recognised as the Kumbh Melas: Prayagraj, Haridwar, Nashik and Ujjain. Priests at other places have also attempted to boost the status of their tirtha by adapting the Kumbh legends. The places whose festivals have been claimed as "Kumbh Mela" include Thirumakudalu Narasipura in Karnataka, Varanasi and Vrindavan in Uttar Pradesh, Kumbhakonam (Mahamaham) in Tamil Nadu, Rajim (Rajim Kumbh Mela) in Chhattisgarh, Bansberia (Bansberia Kumbh Mela) in West Bengal, Kurukshetra and Sonipat in Haryana; and Panauti in Nepal. In 2022, the Bansberia Kumbh Mela (Hooghly) was claimed to have been organised after a 700-year old break. Even Tibet has hosted a festival claimed to be a Kumbh Mela.

=== Dates ===
Each site's celebration dates are calculated in advance according to a special combination of zodiacal positions of Bṛhaspati (Jupiter), Surya (the Sun) and Chandra (the Moon). The relative years vary between the four sites, but the cycle repeats about every 12 years. Since Jupiter's orbit completes in 11.86 years, a calendar year adjustment appears in approximately 8 cycles. Therefore, approximately once a century, the Kumbh Mela returns to a site after 11 years.

Place	River	Zodiac	Season, months	First bathing date	Second date	Third date
Haridwar	Ganga	Jupiter in Aquarius, Sun in Aries	Vasanta, Chaitra (January–April)	Maha Shivaratri	Chaitra Amavasya (new moon)	Mesha Sankranti
Prayagraj (Note: The sangam site is known as Prayag, sometimes Tirtharaj (lit. "king of pilgrimages"))	Ganga and Yamuna junction	Jupiter in Aries, Sun and Moon in Capricorn; or Jupiter in Taurus, Sun in Capricorn	Shishira, Magha (January–February)	Makara Sankranti	Magha Amavasya (new moon)	Vasanta Panchami
Nashik-Trimbak	Godavari	Jupiter and Sun in Leo; or Jupiter, Sun and Moon enters in Cancer on lunar conjunction	Varsha, Bhadrapada (August–September)	Simha Sankranti	Bhadrapada Amavasya (new moon)	Devotthana Ekadashi
Ujjain	Shipra	Jupiter in Leo and Sun in Aries; or Jupiter, Sun, and Moon in Libra on Kartik Amavasya	Grishma, Vaishakha (April–May)	Chaitra Purnima (full moon)	Chaitra Amavasya (new moon)	Vaishakha Purnima (full moon)

=== Calendar ===
Kumbh Mela at Prayagraj is celebrated approximately 3 years after Kumbh at Haridwar and 3 years before Kumbh at Nashik and Ujjain (both of which are celebrated in the same year or one year apart - with Ujjain Mela occurring after Nashik).

Year	Haridwar	Prayagraj	Nashik-Trimbak	Ujjain
1974	Kumbh Mela			
1977		Kumbh Mela		
1980	Ardh Kumbh Mela		Kumbh Mela	Kumbh Mela
1984		Ardh Kumbh Mela		
1986	Kumbh Mela			
1989		Kumbh Mela		
1992	Ardh Kumbh Mela		Kumbh Mela	Kumbh Mela
1995		Ardh Kumbh Mela		
1998	Kumbh Mela			
2001		Kumbh Mela		
2003			Kumbh Mela	
2004	Ardh Kumbh Mela			Kumbh Mela
2007		Ardh Kumbh Mela		
2010	Kumbh Mela			
2013		Maha Kumbh Mela		
2015			Kumbh Mela	
2016	Ardh Kumbh Mela			Kumbh Mela
2019		Ardh Kumbh Mela		
2021	Kumbh Mela			
2025		Maha Kumbh Mela		
2027	Ardh Kumbh Mela		Kumbh Mela	
2028				Kumbh Mela

=== Festival management ===
The Kumbh Mela attracts tens of millions of pilgrims. Managing the temporary featival site requires meticulous planning and coordination across multiple services. The provision of camps for santhas/akharas, food, water, sanitation, emergency health care, fire services, policing, disaster management, and the movement of people require significant prior planning. Further, assistance to those with special needs and lost family members through Bhule-Bhatke Kendra demands extensive onsite communication and coordination. In the case of Prayag in particular, the festival site is predominantly submerged during the monsoon months. Festival authorities therefore have approxiately two and a half months to start and complete the construction of all temporary infrastructure necessary for the pilgrims.

In 2013, the Indian government authorities, in co-operation with seva volunteers, monks and Indian companies, set up 11 sectors with 55 camp clusters, providing round-the-clock first aid, ambulance, pharmacy, sector cleaning, sanitation, food and water distribution (setting up 550 kilometres (340 mi) of pipelines operated by 42 pumps), cooking fuel, and other services. According to Baranwal et al., their 13-day field study of the 2013 Kumbh Mela found that "the Mela committee and all other agencies involved in Mela management successfully supervised the event and made it convenient, efficient and safe," an assessment shared by the US-based Centers for Disease Control for the Nasik Kumbh mela.

In 2025, more than 13000 trains including 3000 special trains have allocated to accommodate large volume of passengers. Yet the surge in devotees caused a full blown crisis across railway stations, especially in Bihar, where passengers who were trying to board the train caused extensive damages to trains. At Madhubani and Samastipur stations, devotees vandalised six air-conditioned coaches of the Jayanagar-New Delhi Swatantrata Senani Express.

== Rituals ==
=== Bathing and processions ===
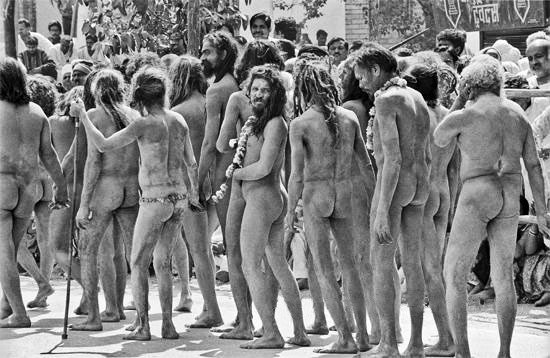
Naga sadhu at a Kumbh procession (1998)

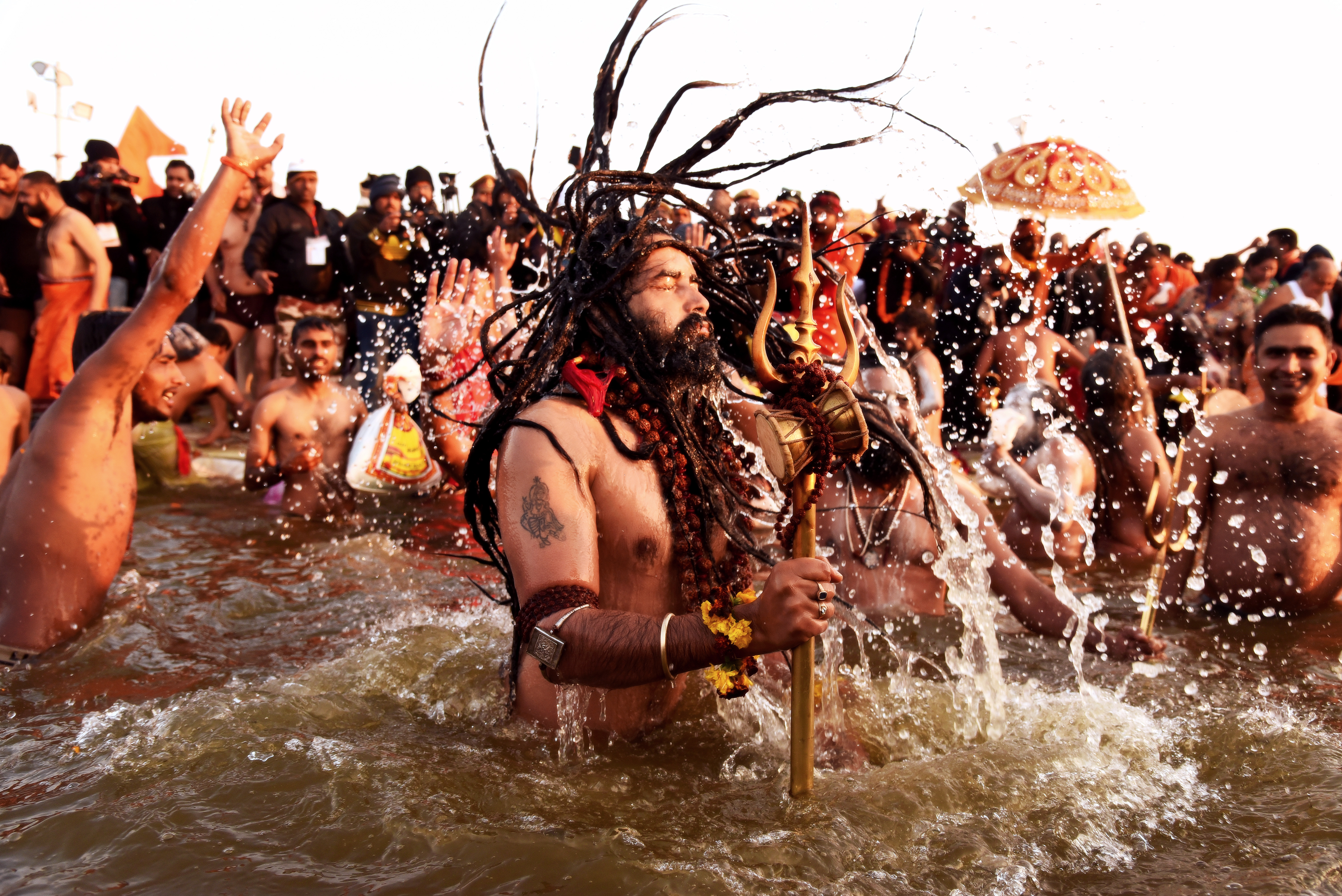
Water dip at the Kumbh festival

Bathing, or a dip in the river waters, with a prayer, is the central ritual of the Kumbh Melas for all pilgrims. Traditionally, on amavasya – the most cherished day for bathing – the Hindu pilgrims welcome and wait for the thirteen sadhu akharas to bathe first. This event – called shahi snan or rajyogi snan – is marked by a celebratory processional march, with banners, flags, elephants, horses and musicians along with the naked or scantily clad monks, (Note: The right to be naga, or naked, is considered a sign of separation from the material world.) some smeared with bhasma (ashes). These monastic institutions come from different parts of India, and have a particular emblem symbol and deity (Ganesha, Dattatreya, Hanuman, etc.). The largest contingent is the Juna akhara, traced to Adi Shankara, representing a diverse mix from the four of the largest Hindu monasteries in India with their headquarters at Sringeri, Dvarka, Jyotirmatha and Govardhana. The Mahanirbani and Niranjani are the other large contingents, and each akhara has their own lineage of saints and teachers. Large crowds gather in reverence and cheer for this procession of monks. Once these monks have taken the dip, the festival day opens for bathing by the pilgrims from far and near the site.

The bathing ritual by the pilgrims may be aided by a Prayagwal priest or maybe a simple dip that is private. When aided, the rituals may begin with mundan (shaving of head), prayers with offerings such as flowers, sindur (vermilion), milk or coconut, along with the recitation of hymns with shradha (prayers in the honour of one's ancestors). More elaborate ceremonies include a yajna (homa) led by a priest. After these river-side rituals, the pilgrim then takes a dip in the water, stands up, prays for a short while, then exits the river waters. Many then proceed to visit old Hindu temples near the site.

The motivations for the bathing ritual are several. The most significant is the belief that the tirtha (pilgrimage) to the Kumbh Mela sites and then bathing in these holy rivers has a salvific value, moksha – a means to liberation from the cycle of rebirths (samsara). The pilgrimage is also recommended in Hindu texts to those who have made mistakes or sinned, to repent for their errors and as a means of prāyaścitta (atonement, penance) for these mistakes. Pilgrimage and bathing in holy rivers with a motivation to do penance and as a means to self-purify has Vedic precedents and is discussed in the early dharma literature of Hinduism. For example, in the epic Mahabharata, the king Yudhisthira is described to be in a state full of sorrow and despair after participating in the violence of the great war that killed many. He goes to a saint, who advises him to go on a pilgrimage to Prayag and bathe in the river Ganges as a means of penance.

=== Feasts, festivities and discussions ===
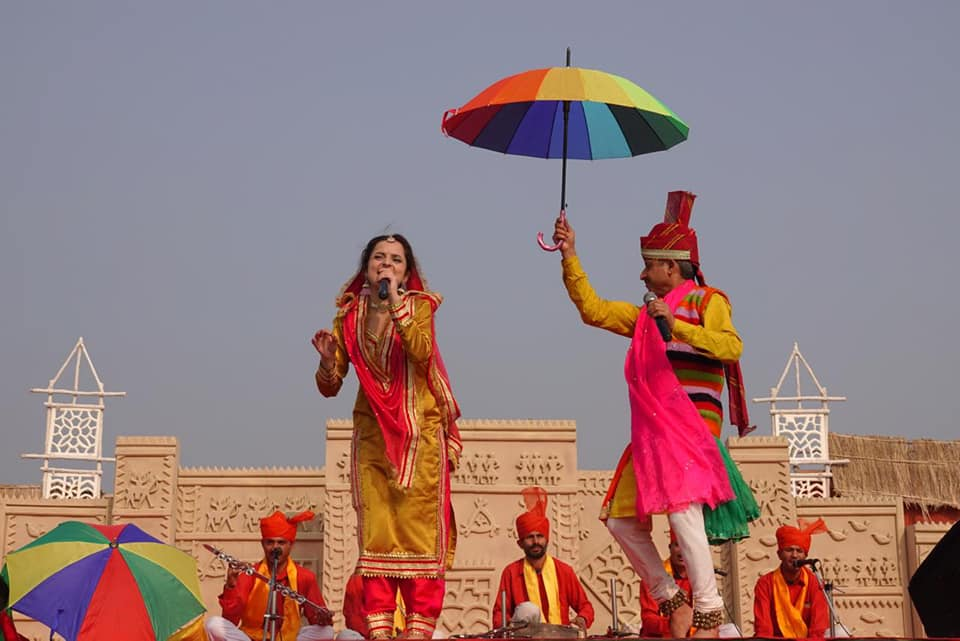
A cultural event at a Kumbh Mela pandal

Some pilgrims walk considerable distances and arrive barefoot, as a part of their religious tradition. Most pilgrims stay for a day or two, but some stay the entire month of Magh during the festival and live an austere life during the stay. They attend spiritual discourses, fast and pray over the month, and these Kumbh pilgrims are called kalpavasis.

The festival site is strictly vegetarian by tradition, as violence against animals is considered unacceptable. Many pilgrims practice partial (one meal a day) or full vrata (day-long fasting), and some abstain from elaborate meals. These ritual practices are punctuated by celebratory feasts where the vast number of people sit in rows and share a community meal – mahaprasada – prepared by volunteers from charitable donations. By tradition, families and companies sponsor these anna dana (food charity) events, particularly for the monks and the poor pilgrims. The management has established multiple food stalls, offering delicacies from different states of India.

Other activities at the mela include religious discussions (pravachan), devotional singing (kirtan), and religious assemblies where doctrines are debated and standardised (shastrartha). The festival grounds also feature a wide range of cultural spectacles over the month of celebrations. These include kalagram (venues of kala, Indian arts), laser light shows, classical dance and musical performances from different parts of India, thematic gates reflecting the historic regional architectural diversity, boat rides, tourist walks to historic sites near the river, as well opportunities to visit the monastic camps to watch yoga adepts and spiritual discourses.

=== Darshan ===
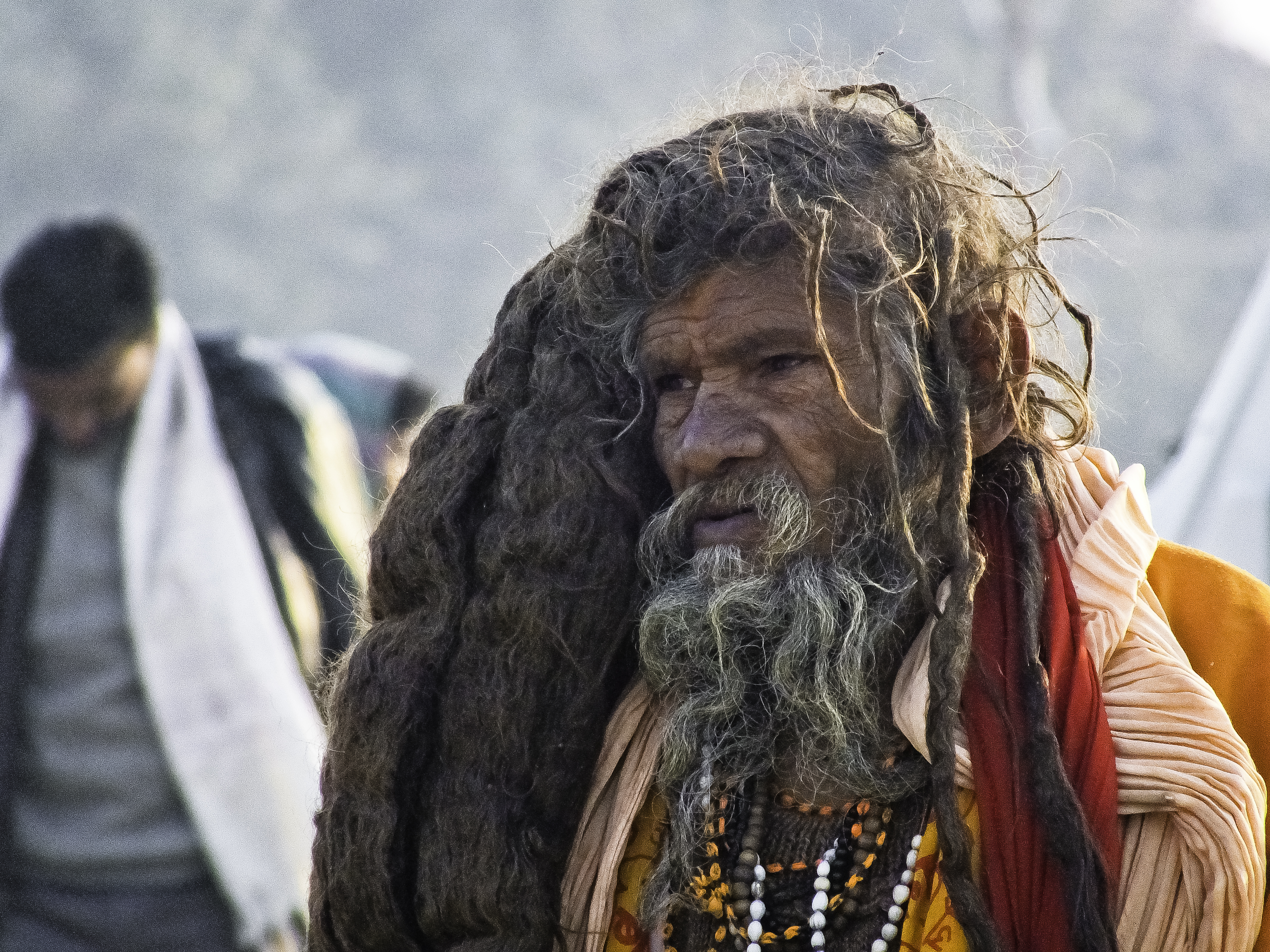
A sadhu at Maha Kumbh, 2013

Darshan, or the act of sacred viewing, holds immense significance at the Kumbh Mela. Pilgrims undertake this journey to experience the profound religious and cultural essence of the event. Two key groups central to the Kumbh Mela are the Sadhus (Hindu ascetics) and the pilgrims. Through their dedicated yogic practices, Sadhus embody the transient nature of life and play a vital role in connecting the spiritual and the mundane.

Sadhus attend the Kumbh Mela to engage with the broader Hindu community, offering the opportunity for devotees to partake in darshan. This interaction allows pilgrims to seek spiritual guidance and advice. Darshan emphasises a visual exchange—a divine connection where worshippers symbolically "drink" the deity's power through sight.

The Kumbh Mela is structured into camps, facilitating access to Sadhus for Hindu worshippers. The darshan experience is integral to the Kumbh Mela, and worshippers approach it with great reverence, ensuring they do not inadvertently offend the religious sanctity of the moment. Interactions with Sadhus are highly respectful, with devotees often leaving offerings at their feet as tokens of devotion and gratitude.

== In culture ==
Kumbh Mela has been a theme for many documentaries, including Kings with Straw Mats (1998) directed by Ira Cohen, Kumbh Mela: The Greatest Show on Earth (2001) directed by Graham Day, Short Cut to Nirvana: Kumbh Mela (2004) directed by Nick Day and produced by Maurizio Benazzo, Kumbh Mela: Songs of the River (2004) by Nadeem Uddin, Invocation, Kumbh Mela (2008), Kumbh Mela 2013: Living with Mahatiagi (2013) by the Ukrainian Religious Studies Project Ahamot, and Kumbh Mela: Walking with the Nagas (2011), Amrit: Nectar of Immortality (2012) directed by Jonas Scheu and Philipp Eyer.

In 2007, National Geographic filmed and broadcast a documentary of the Prayag Kumbh Mela, named Inside Nirvana, under the direction of Karina Holden with the scholar Kama Maclean as a consultant. In 2013, National Geographic returned and filmed the documentary Inside the Mahakumbh. Indian and foreign news media have covered the Kumbh Mela regularly. On 18 April 2010, a popular American morning show, CBS News Sunday Morning, extensively covered Haridwar's Kumbh Mela, calling it "The Largest Pilgrimage on Earth". On 28 April 2010, the BBC released an audio and a video report on Kumbh Mela, titled "Kumbh Mela: 'greatest show on earth'. On 30 September 2010, the Kumbh Mela featured in the second episode of the Sky One TV series An Idiot Abroad with Karl Pilkington visiting the festival.

Young siblings getting separated at the Kumbh Mela was once a recurring theme in Hindi movies. Amrita Kumbher Sandhane, a 1982 Bengali feature film directed by Dilip Roy, also documents the Kumbh Mela.

Ashish Avikunthak's Bengali-language feature length fiction film Kalkimanthakatha (2015) was shot in the Prayag Kumbh Mela in 2013. In this film, two characters search for the tenth and final avatar of Lord Vishnu – Kalki, in the lines of Samuel Beckett's Waiting for Godot.

== See also ==
- Barahakshetra – Hindu and Kirat pilgrimage site in Sunsari, Nepal
- List of largest gatherings in history
- Pushkaram – Indian river worship festival
- Pushkar Fair – Camel, horse, cattle trading fair with cultural events
