= 2015 Nashik-Trimbakeshwar Simhastha =

Kumbh Mela 2015 was a Hindu pilgrimage held in Nashik, Maharashtra, India and Trimbakeshwar, in the Indian state of Maharastra. Pilgrims numbered 80 lakhs to 1 crore and 25 to 30 lakhs respectively during the one year celebration. The festival is considered the largest gathering of people from across the world to undertake the holy bath. The festival is held every three years on rotational basis; it includes the cities of Ujjain and Prayagraj (formerly Allahabad) in addition to Nashik and hence each city gets a festival every 12 years.

== Significance ==
Kumbh Mela 2015, with expected participation of 30 million pilgrims from worldwide, was inaugurated at the Trimbakeshwar temple with prayer, the blowing of a shankhanad (conch shell),showering of flower petals and the traditional flag hoisting at Ramkund in Nashik and at Kushavarat in Trimbakeshwar, both 45 kms away, amidst tight security.

== Infrastructure ==
Kumbh Mela 2015 had an infrastructure cost of Rs 2500 crore (25,000 Million) paid by Maharastra government for amenities such as water, power, lodging, security, and transport across 22 departments.

== See also ==
- Kumbh Mela 2016
