= Bansberia Kumbh Mela =

Hindu religious mela held every year

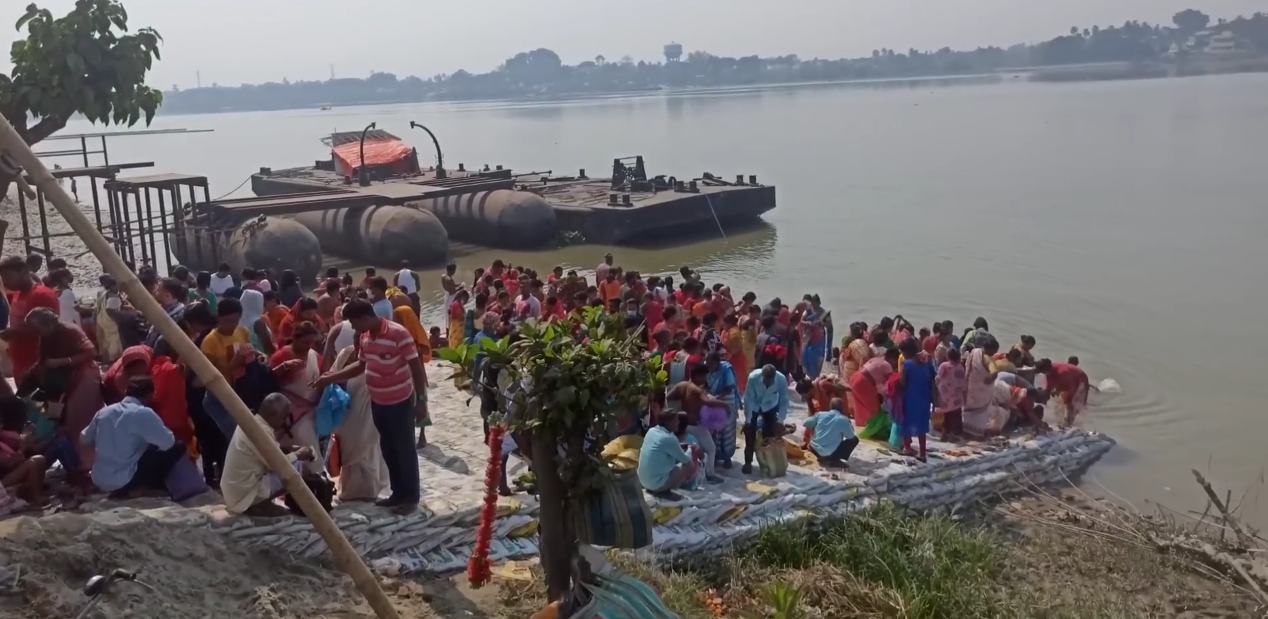
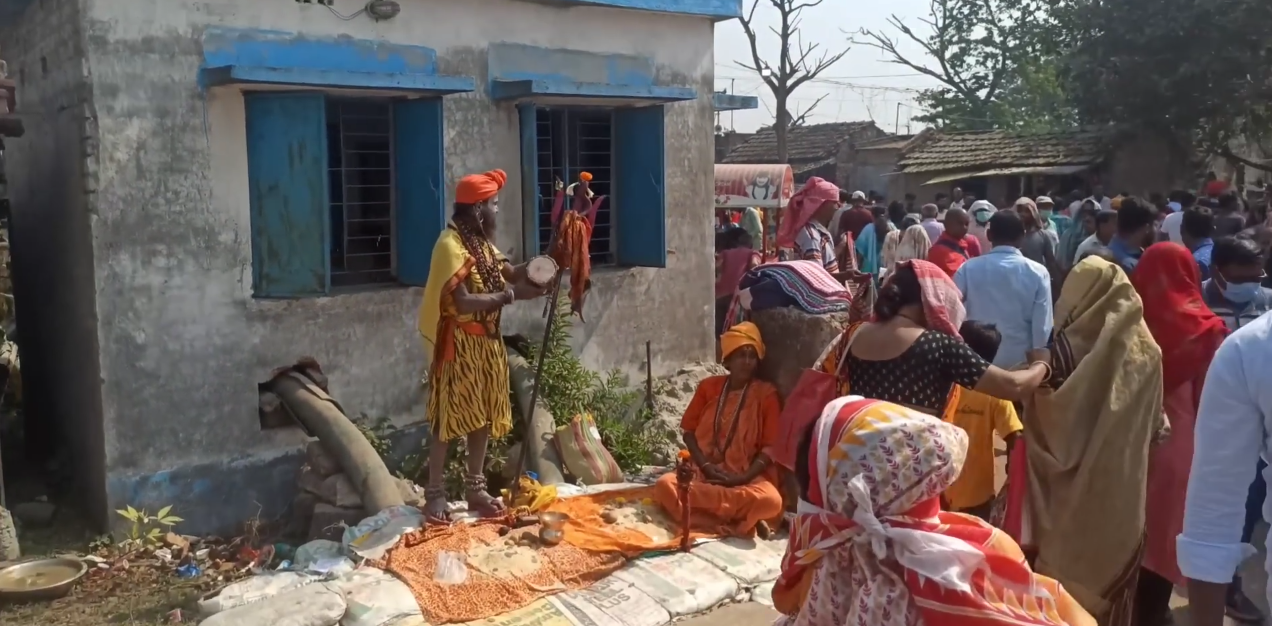
- Status: active
- Genre: Fair
- Frequency: Every year
- Venue: Banks of Hooghly River
- Locations: Bansberia, West Bengal
- Country: India
- Participants: Akharas, pilgrims and merchants

Bansberia Kumbh Mela, also known as Bansberia Tribeni Sangam Kumbha Mela, is a mela, or religious gathering, associated with Hinduism and held at the town Bansberia, West Bengal, India, at the Triveni Sangam, the confluence of the Hooghly, Saraswati, and the Jamuna river.

The tradition of organizing the Kumbh Mela during Makar Sankranti (Magh Sankranti) at this site existed for centuries. In Raghunandan Bhattacharya's Prayaschitta Tattva, Tribeni is referred to as the Prayag of the South. After the Gangasagar Mela, saints and sages would travel on foot to Tribeni to bathe in its holy waters. Tribeni, along with Saptagram, served as a center of education, culture, and trade. However, during Muslim rule and the British era, the temples and pilgrimage sites of Tribeni were destroyed, leading to the decline of the Kumbh Mela tradition.

== History and Mythology ==
=== History ===
Some historians claim that the last Bansberia Kumbha Mela occurred in 1298 AD. In 1979, researcher Alan Morinis mentioned Tribeni's holy bathing in Sankranti in his research paper submitted to Oxford University. The mela is also referenced in Bengali literature. After 700 years, the Kumbh Mela was revived in Bansberia Tribeni, in 2022.

=== Mythology ===
According to Skanda Purana, King Priyavanta of Kashadwipa had seven children - Agnitra, Medhatithi, Vapusman, Jyotisman, Dutisman, Saban, and Bhavya - who made it through the hardships to achieve Siddhi. They built ashramas in seven villages in the vicinity of Tribeni Dham - Basudevpur, Banshberiya, Nityanandpur, Krishnapur, Devanandpur, Shivpur and Baladghati which are collectively called Saptagram, once famous trading ports.

The significance of Triveni Sangam in Prayagraj and Tribeni Sangam in Hooghly is distinct. The ancient Saraswati River is ephemeral in Prayagraj which meets the Ganges and Yamuna, earning it the moniker 'Yaktabeni' while at Hooghly's Tribeni, Yamuna is ephemeral and the Ganges and Saraswati have freed here, known as 'Muktabeni'.
