= 2001 Prayag Kumbh Mela =

Event in Prayagraj, Uttar Pradesh, India

The 2001 Prayag Kumbh Mela was a gathering held at the convergence of the Ganga, Yamuna, and Saraswati rivers in Prayagraj, Uttar Pradesh, held from 9 January to 21 February. It was the first Kumbh Mela in the millennium and attracted around 70 million visitors.

The Kumbh Mela was also auspicious considering it coincided with astrological planetary alignment occurring only once in 144 years. The event was held in a 6000-acre area; it had particularly significance for being held once in 12-year period in Hindu mythology as its believed that the battle for nectar between gods and demons lasted for 12 years. The event was also held in Haridawar, Ujjain, and Nashik.

== Attendees ==
Maha Kumbh 2001 Mela had the presence of important movie stars and politicians such as Sonia Gandhi who participated by taking bath in the Sangam.

== Promotions ==
The 2001 Prayag Kumbh Mela had a promotional expenditure of more than Rs 5 to 7 crores for FMCG Companies.

== See also ==
- Maha Kumbh 2013 Mela
