= Rajim Kumbh Mela =

Hindu pilgrimage

- Genre: Pilgrimage
- Frequency: Every year
- Locations: Rajim, Gariaband district, Chhattisgarh, India
- Country: India

Rajim Kumbh Mela (Devanagari: राजिम कुम्भ मेला) is an annual Hindu pilgrimage held in Rajim, located in Gariaband district, Chhattisgarh, India. The pilgrimage is similar to the traditional pilgrim fairs like those held in Haridwar and Prayagaraj. Like them, it's a kumbh, where devotees flock in to bathe en masse in sacred rivers to wash off their sins and attain redemption.

Rajim has long been a hotspot for the Vaishnavites. It is also a known Shaiva dharma centre. It was also a stopping place on the pilgrimage route to other pilgrim centres in the vicinity. The ritual of Kalpwas is performed at Rajim just like it is at Prayagraj. The religious congregation at Rajim performs a ceremony known as the 'fifth Kumbh' similar to the traditional 'Punni mela' observed every year at the famous Rajiv Lochan temple located near the holy confluence of the Mahanadi, Pairi and Sondur rivers in Rajim.

The Rajim Kumbh Mela is celebrated every year during February–March for about 15 days. The Kumbh is attended by thousands of devotees and saints from various parts of India and abroad.

The Kumbh was brought to much spotlight with significant investment by the local government and especially by the efforts of the present state minister for Agriculture Shri Brijmohan Agrawal who has raised the stature of the kumbh in the country by personally investing in the fair and its infrastructure giving it a modern template without losing its Vedic spirit.

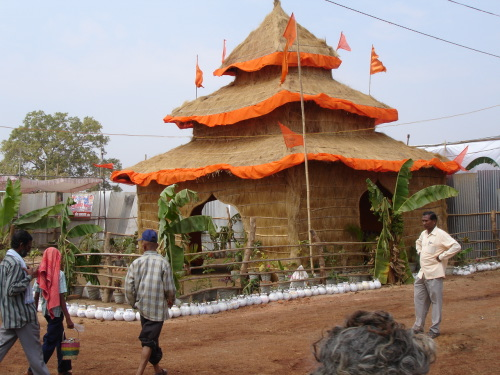
Rajim Kumbh Mela 2007

== History ==
Rajim Kumbh Mela has been celebrated as a proper kumbh since being brought forth into the limelight by the efforts of both the state and central government. Though significantly it is a huge Kumbh Mela and regarded as the ‘5’th Kumbh Mela, the Rajim Kumbh Mela missed the coverage and the limelight the major kumbh festivals have received.

=== Patrons of Rajim Kumbh Mela ===
Shri Brijmohan Agrawal is the minister for religious trust and endowments with varied portfolio in the government of Chhattisgarh. He has been influential in bringing the Rajim Kumbh Mela to the fore investing in the spiritual and financial aspects of the Kumbh. He is highly regarded as the guardian and whole soul of the Rajim Kumbh Mela by the locals as he with his fleet is a regular at the Kumbh and manages the daily affairs and management of the Kumbh. Shri Brijmohan personally takes care of the arrangements of sheltering, lodging and food for thousands of devotees that throng to one of the largest religious congregation in India. He has been prompt in divesting the state government as well the centre to invest in the infrastructural development and sustenance of the Kumbh that it accommodate more pilgrims with better conveniences.

== Mythology ==
There are many folklores associated with the Rajim Kumbh Mela with slight variations they all essentially points to a Vaishnavite significance of the place.

In some oral traditions, it is told that Lord Vishnu asked Lord Vishwakarma, the chief architect of the universe, to build for him a temple cum earthly abode at such a place upon the land where it has not been defiled by dead or burnt carcasses or incremation to a periphery of about 10 miles. Lord Vishwakarma scoured the planet in vain and returned vaikuntha empty-handed to which Lord Vishnu hurled a Lotus towards Earth and asked Lord Vishwakarma to erect a temple at the site where the flower kisses the ground. Thus a temple was built upon the nectars of the heavenly lotus known today as the Rajim Lochan temple, and the 5 petals eventuated the Panchkoshi Dhaam viz. Kuleshwarnath (Rajim), Champeshwarnath (Chamaranya), Bramhkeshwarnaath (Bramhani), Pandeshwarnath (Fingeshwar) and Kopeshwarnaath (Kopra).

Another legend is that King Ratnakar a very religious person who was a very pious person once, while performing a Yagya, was attacked by demons. They obstructed his ritual. Helpless and depressed King Ratnakar wailed and beckoned the gods. Meanwhile his royal elephant Gajendra was battling for life being caught by a croc named Grah. The elephant in grave pain, requested Lord Vishnu to help save him and it was then that Lord Vishnu came barefoot in rescue. After salvaging the helpless elephant, Lord Vishnu heard the plea of the king and appeared before him. He also blessed King Ratnakar and promised to stay in the earth as ‘Rajim Lochan’, where the pitcher fest started for being another abode of lord Venkateswara or Vishnu.

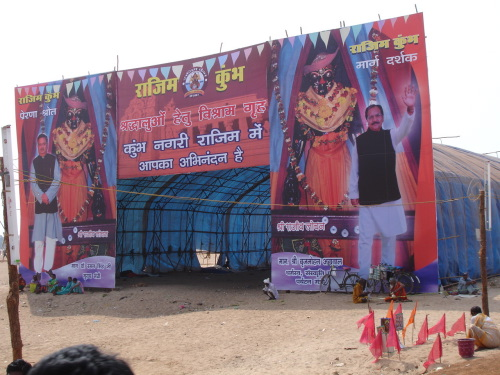
Rajim Kumbh Mela 2007

== Rituals ==
Thousands of Naga Sadhus, Sants, Mahatmas, Rishis, Munis and Margdarshak Gurus come to Rajim Kumbh Mela each year for the festival. People start flocking to Rajim a day ahead of the festival, and take part in the special puja performed at midnight. Two temples that are prominently visited by the pilgrims during the kumbh are the Shri Kuleshwar Mahadev and Shri Rajiv Lochan.

=== Shahi snan in shahi kund ===
In the ghats of the Mahanadi that streams Rajim, the sadhus and other pilgrims take holy dips.

=== Holy bath in the Triveni Sangam ===
Devotees also take a holy bath in the Triveni Sangam, the confluence of the three rivers.

=== Shobha Yatra (rally) ===
Sobha yatras are daily carried out through the festival ground and the town, with devotees and sadhus carrying images of Lord Vishnu and occasionally of lord Shiva.

=== Archana ===
Daily archanas are conducted in various parts of the ghats and makeshift temples erected at the festival site, attended by thousands of locals and tourists.

In ‘Brahma Puranas’, 14 kinds of acts have been advised as unholy during ‘Kumbha-Parva’ such as having bath in river using soap, washing clothes, utensils in river water, throwing trash and excretion, etc. Those doing such things have been described as sinners; their sin considered to be as grave as slaughtering of cow. The state management erects notice bearing the same in various parts of the kumbh site.

== Location information ==
Rajim is in Gariaband district, about 45 kilometres from the Chhattisgarh's capital Raipur.

Besides the Rajim Lochan Mandir there are other temples and ashrams, in the area.

Rajim is also known as the Prayagraj of Chhattisgarh for an abundance of temples in the area. Some of the renowned sacred temples at Rajim are Rajiv Lochan, Mama Bhanja, Kuleshwar Mahadev, etc. The Kuleshwar Mahadev temple is situated in the midst of the confluence of three river streams Pairi, Sondur and Mahanadi.

Local Chhattisgarhi food and Indian cuisine is available in the area.

There is a ban on liquor and non-veg food in the town during the festival. Although the restriction is only in the vicinity of the kumbh festival.

Some of the prominent temples in Rajim are:

- Rajim Lochan temple
- Kuleshwar Temple
- Rajeshwar temple
- Daneshwar temple
- Jagannath temple
- Pancheshwar Mahadev
- Bhooteshwar Mahadev
- Someshwar Mahadev

== 2017 Rajim Kumbh Mela ==
In the year 2017, the Kumbh was organized from February 10 to 24.

Rajim Kumbh Mela 2017 was significant and very auspicious as it had taken the form of a Maha Kumbh upon its completion of 12 years. The Rajim Maha Kumbh was attended by about a million pilgrims mostly sadhus and mahants. The fest embarked a plethora of religious ceremonies, functions and celebration across Rajim and the state.

== 2020 Rajim Kumbh Mela ==
In the year 2020, the Kumbh was organized from February 9 to 21.

== How to Reach Rajim ==
By Air:- Swami Vivekananda Airport at Raipur is the nearest airport to Rajim, 43.6 km away. Raipur is connected to major cities in India by air. It has direct air connectivity with New Delhi, Mumbai, Bhopal, Pune, Hyderabad, Nagpur, and Indore. Taxi services are available to reach Rajim from Raipur airport.

By Train:- Raipur railway station is a major junction of south east central railway zone. It has many long-distance and direct trains to almost all parts of India.

By Road:- Rajim is well connected by road. Regular bus services are available from Raipur (46 km).
