= Nick Day (film director) =

British American filmmaker

Nick Day is a British born, US-based filmmaker specializing in the topic of consciousness. His most notable work to date as director is the documentary Short Cut to Nirvana: Kumbh Mela.

== Career ==
Day trained and worked as an editor in London while studying cinema as part of the British Film Institute/University of London diploma program. After relocating to the US, he worked for several years in television production on a wide range of programming, including commercials, news, current affairs, and arts and entertainment for broadcast in Italy, Brazil, Germany, as well as the US. He later produced and directed the documentary Short Cut to Nirvana: Kumbh Mela with Maurizio Benazzo, which won several awards.

Day also won an award for best screenplay for The Fallen, a World War I drama directed by Ari Taub. Day currently produces the DVD series The Consciousness Chronicles, which documents the latest research and theory of consciousness, and includes interviews with David Chalmers, Rupert Sheldrake, Deepak Chopra, Marilyn Schlitz, Dean Radin, and Stuart Hameroff. He is also director and co-writer with Stuart Hameroff of Mindville, an animated feature film currently in development.

Day has appeared on panels on conscious filmmaking and guest-lectured at USC School of Cinematic Arts and University of California, Berkeley's Department of Anthropology. He speaks on consciousness and the cinema, and has also presented at the Toward a Science of Consciousness conference in Tucson, AZ. Day is a member of the National Guild of Hypnotists.

== Filmography ==
=== Director ===
- Mindville (TBA)
- Short Cut to Nirvana: Kumbh Mela (2004)

=== Producer ===
- The Consciousness Chronicles (2011)

=== Screenplay ===
- The Fallen (2004)
