= 2016 Ujjain Simhastha =

Religious event

Kumbh Mela 2016 was held in the ancient religious city of Ujjain, India, along the banks of the Kshipra River. Approximately five crores pilgrims from around the world participated in this month-long event to take a holy bath. The event is held in the city every 12 years as part of a four-legged rotation of the Kumbh festival, with the other three being Haridwar, Allahabad, and Nashik.

== Significance ==
Kumbh Mela 2016 was held in the ancient religious city of Ujjain, with the gathering of millions of pilgrims who took a holy bath in the Kshipra River at Ramghat. Kumbh Mela 2016 was organised in Ujjain and was also called Simhasth Maha Kumbh. Ujjain Sinmasth is part of the four-legged cycle of Kumbh, with the other three being Haridwar, Allahabad, and Nashik, where the festival is held after the turn of every 12 years.

== Uniqueness ==
Kumbh Mela 2016 was unique due to the participation of new akhara of transgender members.

== Important dates ==
Kumbh Mela 2016 had the following auspicious days-

- Full Moon on 22 April 2016
- Vaishakh Krishna Amavasya on 6 May 2016
- Shukla/Akshay Tritya on 9 May 2016
- Shukla Panchami and Ekadashi on 11 and 17 May 2016
- Purnima on 21 May 2016

== See also ==
- Maha Kumbh 2013 Mela
