= Makar Mela =

Hindu pilgrimage and festival in Nepal

- Genre: Pilgrimage
- Frequency: Every 12 years
- Location: Panauti
- Country: Nepal

Makar Mela is a traditional Hindu festival celebrated every 12 years in the month of Magh (mid-January to early February) in Panauti town of Nepal. The festival attracts Hindu pilgrims from all over Nepal, India and some foreign tourists. Pilgrims believe that taking a dip in the holy river during the festival washes away their sins.

The festival is celebrated for the whole month of Magh at Tribenighat, the confluence of three rivers viz. Punyamati, Roshi (also called Lilawati) and Rudrawati. The festival starts when the sun enters Makara Rashi as per the Hindu astrology. Pilgrims bathe in the river and worship Basuki Naag which is considered to be the caretaker of Panauti. Then they proceed to worship Indreshwor Mahadev.

== Mythology ==
According to the mythology, once Indra, the king of heaven, suffered from an incurable disease. To cure it, he meditated for 12 years to get rid of disease by pleasing Shiva at Tribenighat. Shiva mixed some nectar in Rudrawati river to cure the disease. When Indra dipped in the river, he got cured. It is believed that every 12 years, the nectar flows in the river which will cure all the diseases.

Another mythology describes that the festival is celebrated from the time of king Dirgharath of Panauti and king Satyawar of Patan which they started to pray goddess Phulchowki for the rivers Roshi and Godawari.

== Others ==
- As a ritual, the festival was forbidden to be visited by the King of Nepal because the kings of Nepal and the main god of the festival - Vishnu were considered to be the same god. However, the last King of Nepal, Gyanendra visited the festival.
- Some environmental concerns have been raised because of the water pollution caused during the festival.

== Festival years ==
- 2066 B.S.
- 2078 B.S. (2021)
- 2090 B.S.
