= Chahar Gulshan =

18th-century book by Rai Chatar Man Kayath

- Author: Rai Chatar Man Kayath
- Language: Persian
- Subject: History of India
- Genre: non-fiction
- Published: 1759 (manuscript)
- Publication place: Mughal Empire

Chahar Gulshan ("Four Gardens") is an 18th-century Persian language book about the history of India. It was written by Rai Chatar Man Kayath of the Mughal Empire in 1759 CE. It is also known as Akhbar-un Nawadir or Akhbaru-l-Nawadir ("Accounts of Rare Things").

== Date and authorship ==
The book was written by Rai Chatar Man Kayath, also known as Rai Chaturman Saksena Kayasth. The author was a Kayastha of the Saksinah (Saxena) clan. The preface states that the book was completed in 1173 A.H. (1759 CE), and was commissioned by Wazir Gazi-ud-din Khan.

Chahar Gulshan was completed only a week before the author's death. His grandson Rai Chandrabhan Raizadah re-arranged the content and added a second preface to the book in 1789. Raizada's copy is the earliest surviving manuscript, likely copied from the original. It is held in the Bodleian Library, with the shelfmark MS Elliott 366.

== Content ==
The title of the book ("four gardens") refers to its four sections.

1. Ahwal-i Padshahan-i Hindostan
  - Description of the kings of Hindustan (northern India) from the legendary Yudhishthira to Shah Jahan II
  - Information on provinces (subahs) of the Mughal Empire, except those in Deccan.
2. Ayan-i subahjat-i junubistan
  - Information on the provinces of the Deccan region
  - Information on the Deccan Sultans
3. Musafat-o manazil
  - Road maps with distances and list of sarais (roadside inns)
  - Topgraphy (Rivers, embankments, bridges and canals)
4. Silasil fuqra‘-wa darveshan-i Hunud
  - Description of dervishes and saints
  - Largely based on Akhabar al-Akhiyar, but also contains some unique information on local saints

The book contains important statistical data, including total cultivated area, number of villages and mahal-wise revenue. However, these statistics are from a period earlier than the book's completion date, likely 1720 CE. By the time the book had been completed (1759 CE), the Mughal emperor was a figurehead. Ahmad Shah Durrani had captured Punjab. The Marathas had gained control of western Deccan and had crossed Narmada. Nizam-ul-Mulk Asaf Jah I, the Mughal viceroy of Deccan, had set up a practically independent state. The book itself states that statistics of Bijapur and Hyderabad are incomplete, as Asaf Jah I had carried away all the records.

=== Section 1: Hindustan ===
The first gulshan contains information on the following provinces:

1. Delhi:
  - Kings, saints, Hindu shrines, melas, chhatars, rivers and canals, mines, province- and sarkar-level statistics
2. Agra
  - Rulers, saints, forts, buildings, Hindu shrines, rivers, mines, province- and sarkar-level statistics
3. Punjab
  - Kings, saints, Hindu shrines, forts and buildings, mosques and gardens, doabs and rivers, mines, provincial/detailed statistics
4. Multan
  - Rulers, saints, forts, provincial/detailed statistics
5. Thatta
  - Kings, provincial/detailed statistics
6. Kashmir
  - Kings, lakes, hills, shrines, springs, mines, rivers, provincial/detailed statistics
7. Orissa
  - Saints, temples, provincial/detailed statistics
8. Bengal
  - Rulers, divisions and neighbouring countries, provincial/detailed statistics
9. Bihar
  - Kings and saints, rivers, Hindu shrines, provincial/detailed statistics
10. Allahabad
  - Kings, saints, Hindu holy places, forts, mines, provincial/detailed statistics
11. Awadh
  - Holy tombs, kings and saints, Hindu holy places, other towns, provincial/detailed statistics
12. Ajmer
  - Kings and saints, forts and mines, provincial/detailed statistics
13. Gujarat
  - Kings and saints, Hindu holy places, cities, provincial/detailed statistics
14. Malwa
  - Kings, citites, provincial/detailed statistics
15. Kabul
  - Description of Swad

=== Section 2: Deccan ===
The second gulshan contains information on the 6 provinces of Deccan:

1. Berar
  - Provincial/detailed statistics
2. Khandesh
  - Provincial/detailed statistics
3. Aurangabad
  - Provincial/detailed statistics, crops
4. Bijapur
  - Provincial/detailed statistics, Nagarkot fort, revenue in money
5. Hyderabad
  - Mughal conquest of Golconda, Provincial/detailed statistics
6. Bidar
  - Provincial/detailed statistics, industries and fruits

This section also contains additional sub-sections on:

- Sultans of Deccan
- Forts of the Deccan provinces
- Saints of the Deccan provinces
- Hindu shrines, springs and rivers in Deccan

=== Section 3: Road book ===
The third gulshan describes the 24 important roads connecting the main cities of the Mughal Empire:

1. Agra-Delhi
2. Delhi-Lahore
3. Lahore-Gujrat-Atak
4. Atak-Kabul
5. Kabul-Ghazni-Qandahar
6. Gujrat-Srinagar
7. Lahore-Multan
8. Delhi-Ajmer
9. Delhi-Bareilly-Benares-Patna
10. Delhi-Kol
11. Agra-Allahabad
12. Bijapur-Ujjain
13. Sironj-Narwar
14. Aurangabad-Ujjain
15. Golconda-Asir-Hindia
16. Hindia-Sironj
17. Narwar-Gwalior-Dholpur
18. Dholpur-Agra
19. Multan-Bhakkar
20. Srinagar-Atak
21. Ajmer-Ahmedabad
22. Surkhab-Kabul
23. Qandahar-Atak
24. Qandahar-Multan

=== Section 4 ===
The fourth gulshan describes "Hindu faqirs" (including the Sikh Gurus) and Muslim saints.

== Writing style ==
The Chahar Gulshan is a condensed book of history. Unlike the contemporary Persian-language works that featured flowerly language, it contains short and simple sentences. Jadunath Sarkar remarked that the book appears to be a "set of notes" rather than a finished treatise.

== Translations and editio princeps ==
A partial English translation of the book was published in Jadunath Sarkar's India of Aurangzib (1901). However, his translation has several statistical errors, because he misinterpreted the raqam notation used in the original work. In addition, Sarkar omitted several parts. For example:

- the "vague and rhetorical" details of fairs and amusements
- "dry and short" chronicles of kings
- chronicles that "disturbed the holy repose" of the saints (including the entire Section 4)

Muhammad Riazuddin Khan translated the work into Hindi (1990, Tonk). This work contained an editio princeps of the original manuscript, which was not annotated and edited.

In 2011, the National Mission for Manuscripts published a version annotated and edited by Chander Shekhar. This version was based on five manuscripts:

1. National Museum New Delhi (1794)
2. Khuda Bakhsh Oriental Library, Patna (1803)
3. Salar Jung Museum, Hyderabad (1811)
4. Maulana Azad Library, Aligarh (not dated)
5. Maulana Abul Kalam Azad Arabic Persian Research, Tonk (not dated)
