= 2013 Prayag Kumbh Mela =

Hindu festival in Prayagraj, Uttar Pradesh, India

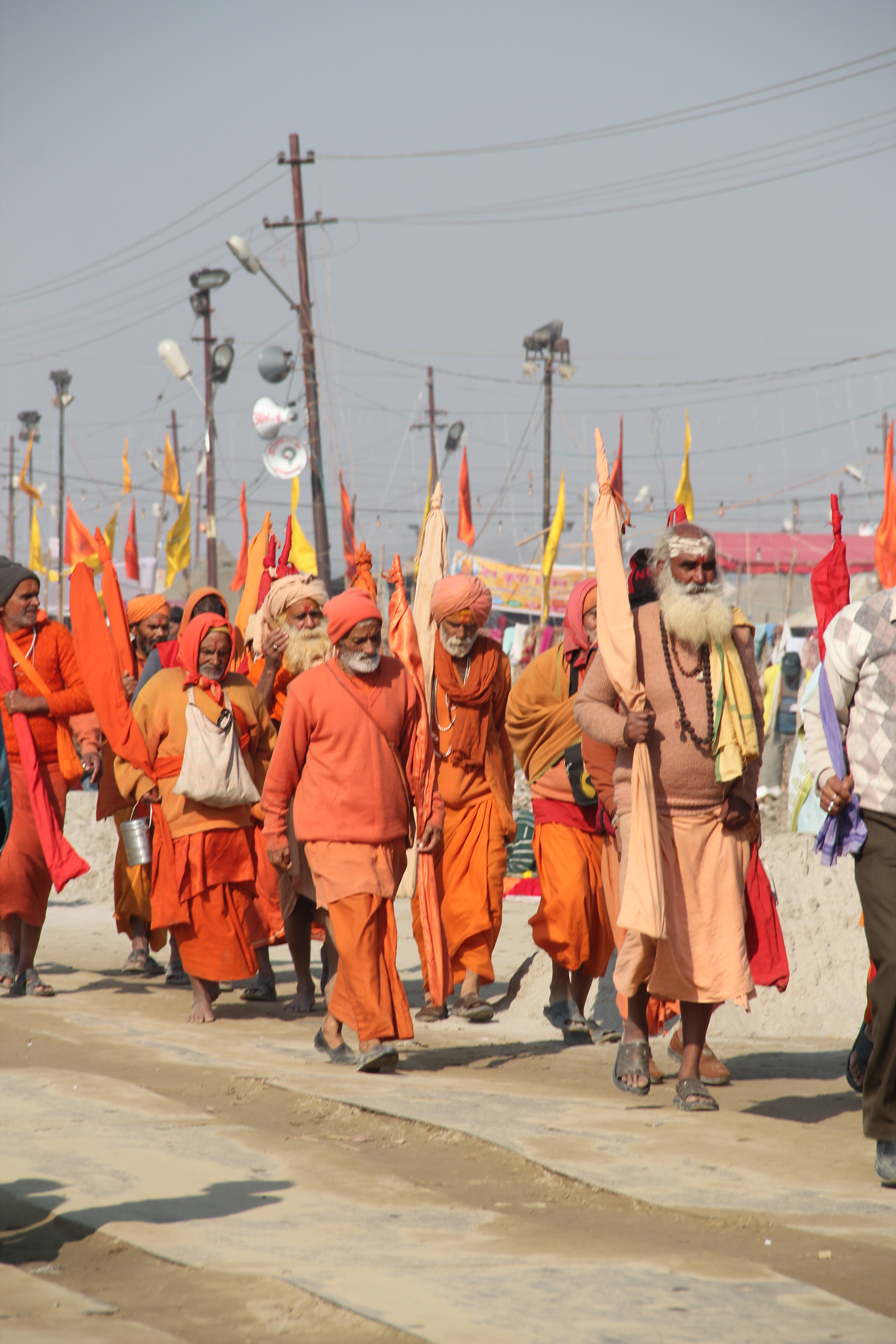
A group of Hindu monks walking their way to the Kumbh Mela 2013

2013 Kumbh Mela was held at convergence place of Ganga, Yamuna and Saraswati rivers in Prayagraj, Uttar Pradesh, as once in 12 years event as a 55 day event had attracted around 80 to 100 million visitors. It has a significance of being held once in 12 year period in Hindu Mythology as its believed that the battle for nectar between Gods and Demons lasted for 12 years. This event is also held in the cities of Haridawar, Ujjain and Nashik in a cyclic order with another city holding the event next time.

== Significance ==
Kumbh Mela 2013 was held for 55 days as a once in 12 year event which was attended by around 80 to 100 million pilgrims.

Kumbh Mela 2013 had the message "Did you clean your hands with Lifebuoy" in the 2.5 million chapatis served during the period.

== Area ==
Kumbh Mela 2013 was spread across 23.5-square-kilometer area and was held from 14 January 2013 (Maha Sankranti Day) to 10 March 2013 (Maha Shivratri).

== Case study ==
Kumbh Mela 2013 Mela was taken as case study by Harvard University as it was considered as World's Largest Public Gathering.

== Cost of infrastructure ==
Kumbh Mela 2013 costed Rs 1300 crore for various infrastructure projects.

== Pollution ==
Kumbh Mela 2013 is believed to have raised pollution levels in the convergence of Rivers Ganga and Yamuna as around 8 million people took bath.

== Stampede ==
During Kumbh Mela 2013 there was a stampede tragedy in which 36 people were killed on the auspicious day of Mauni Amavasya.

== See also ==
- Prayag Kumbh Mela
