= List of disasters in New York City by death toll =

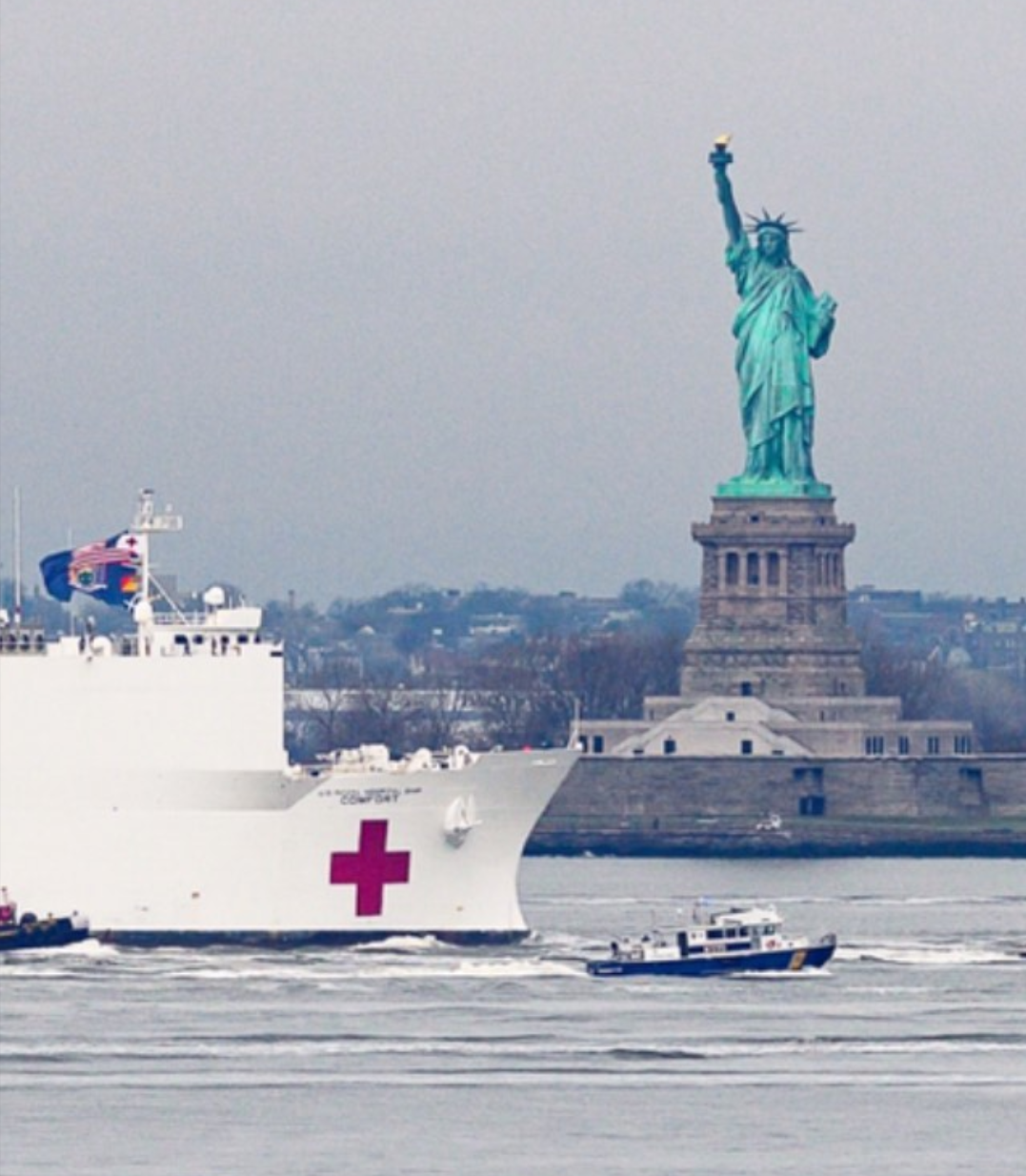
COVID-19 pandemic

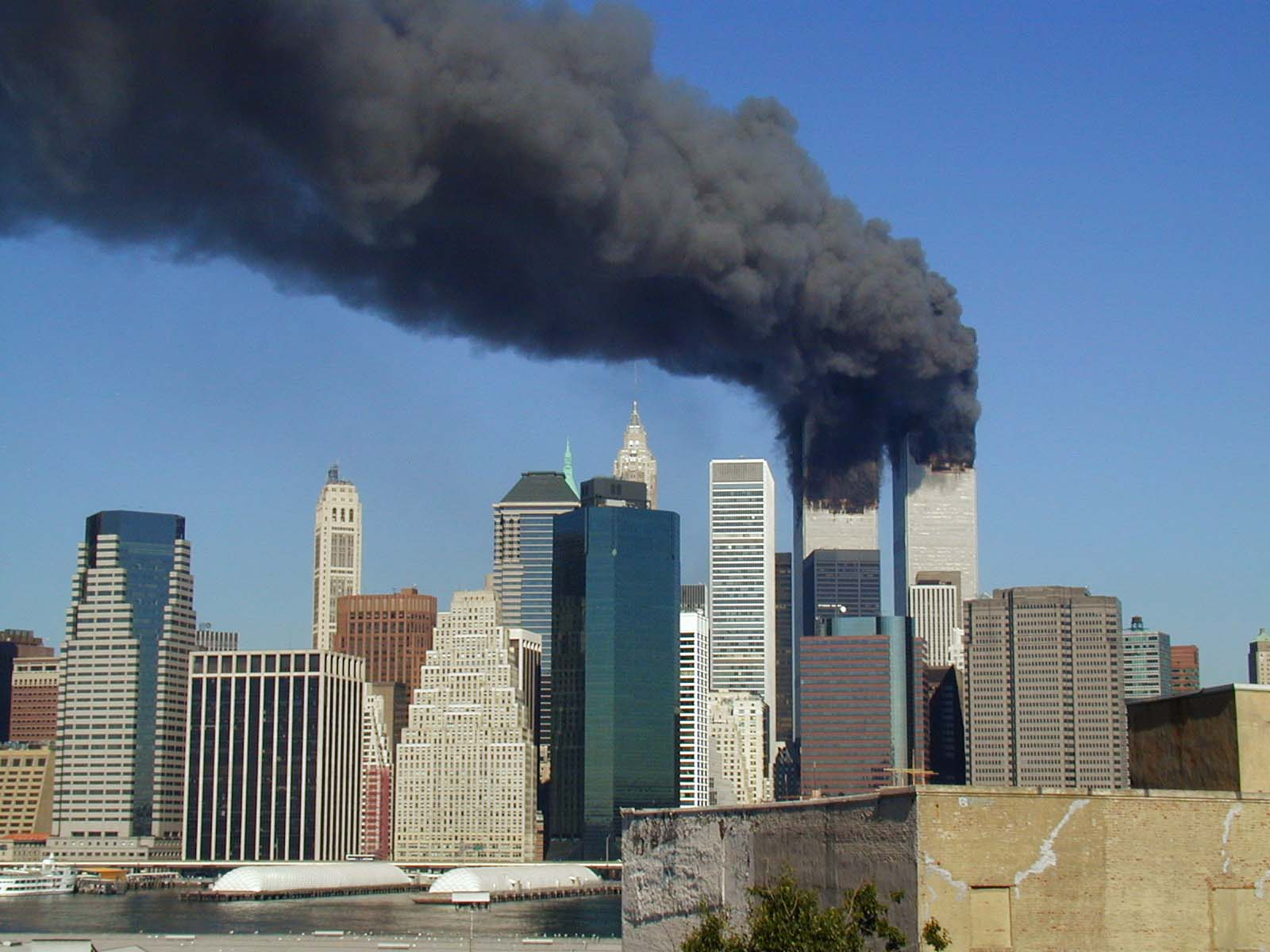
September 11, 2001

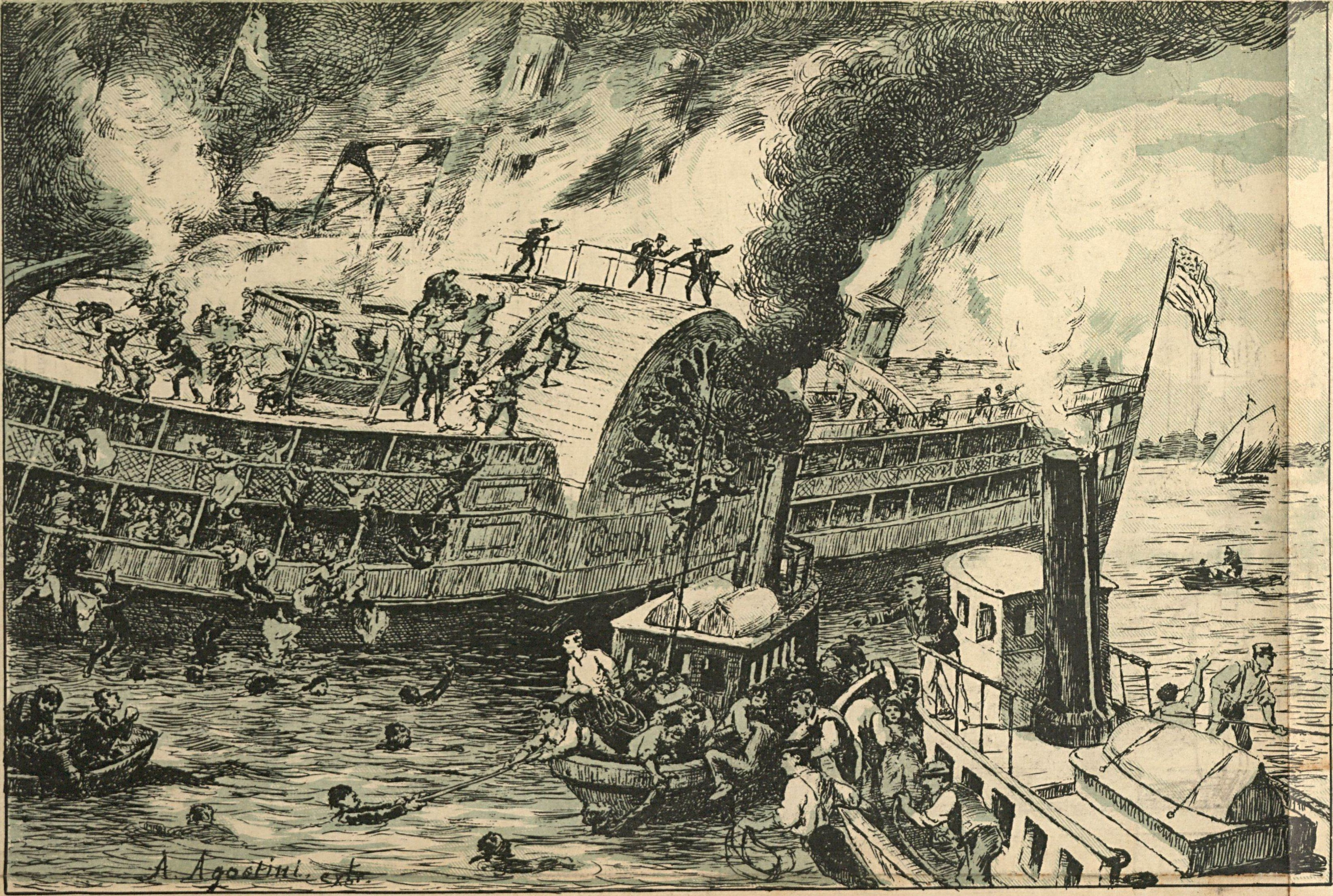
General Slocum disaster

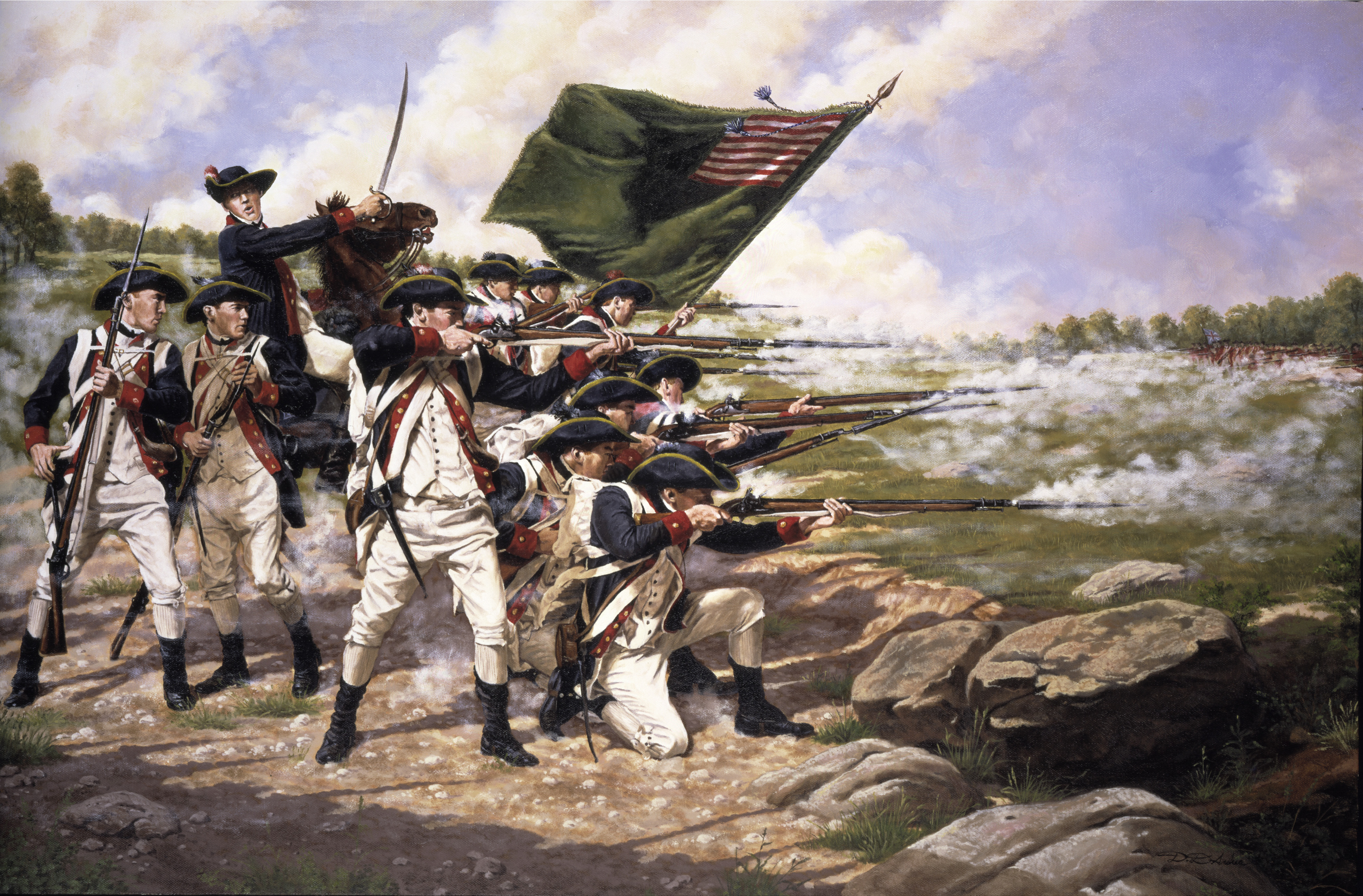
Battle of Long Island

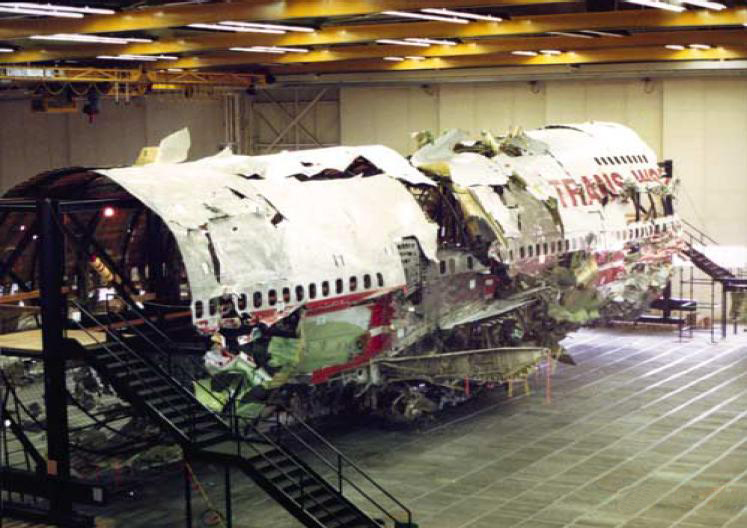
TWA Flight 800

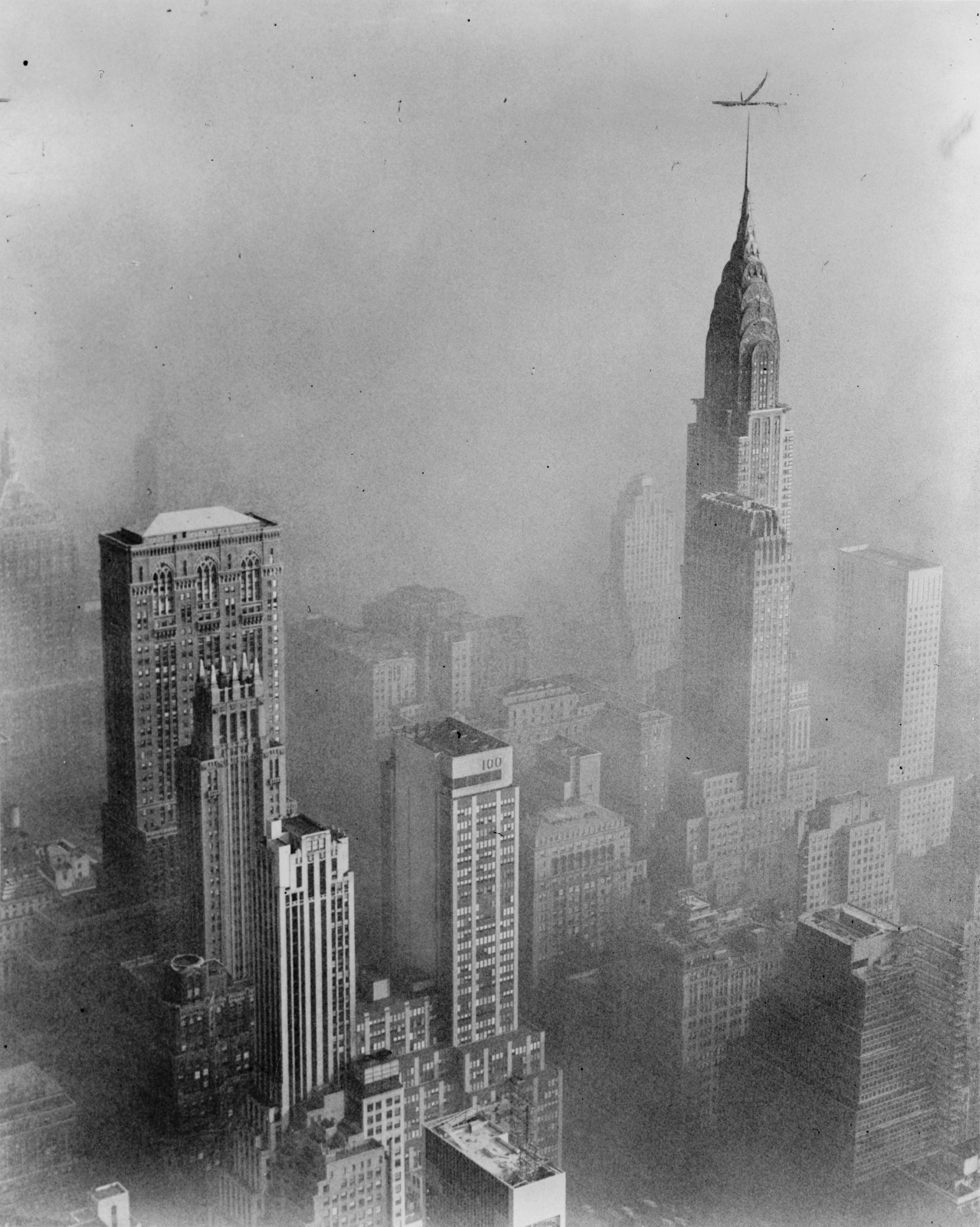
1953 smog

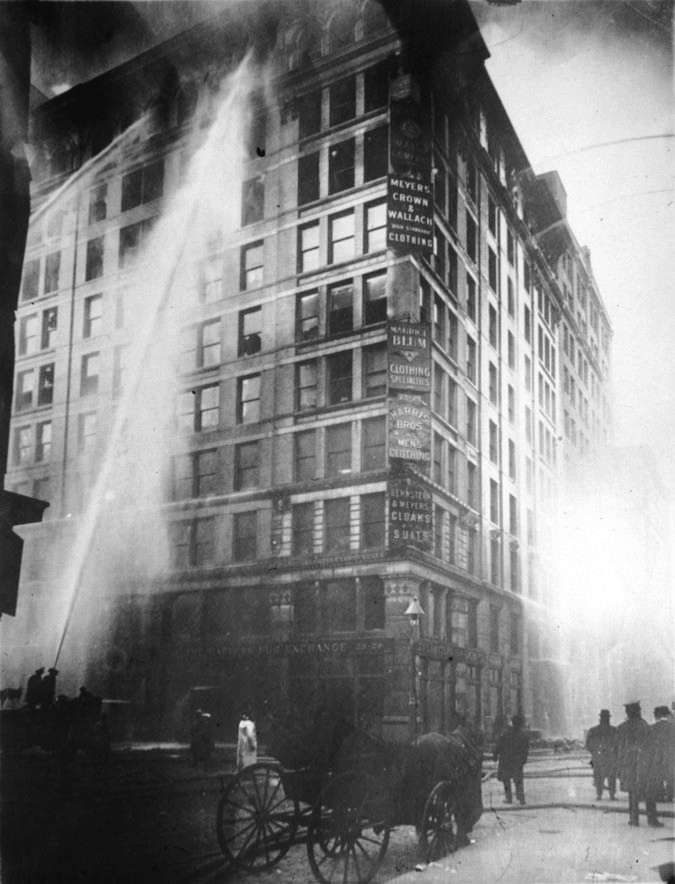
Triangle Shirtwaist Factory fire

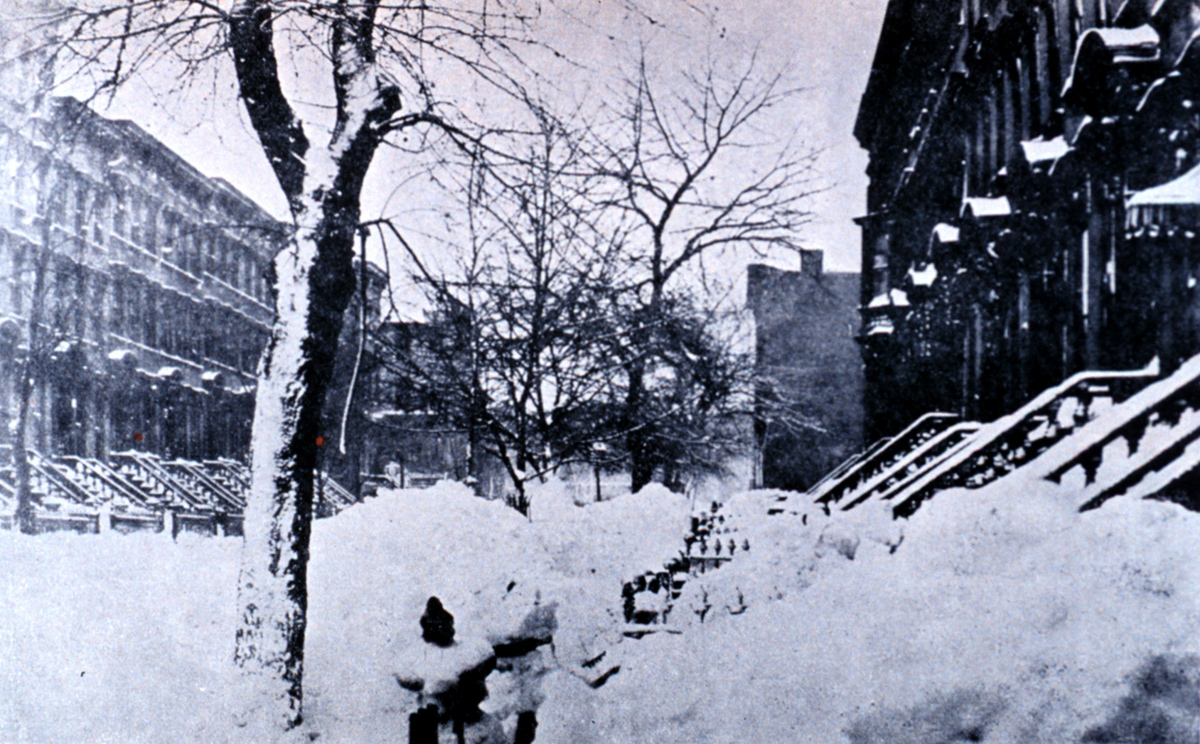
Great Blizzard of 1888

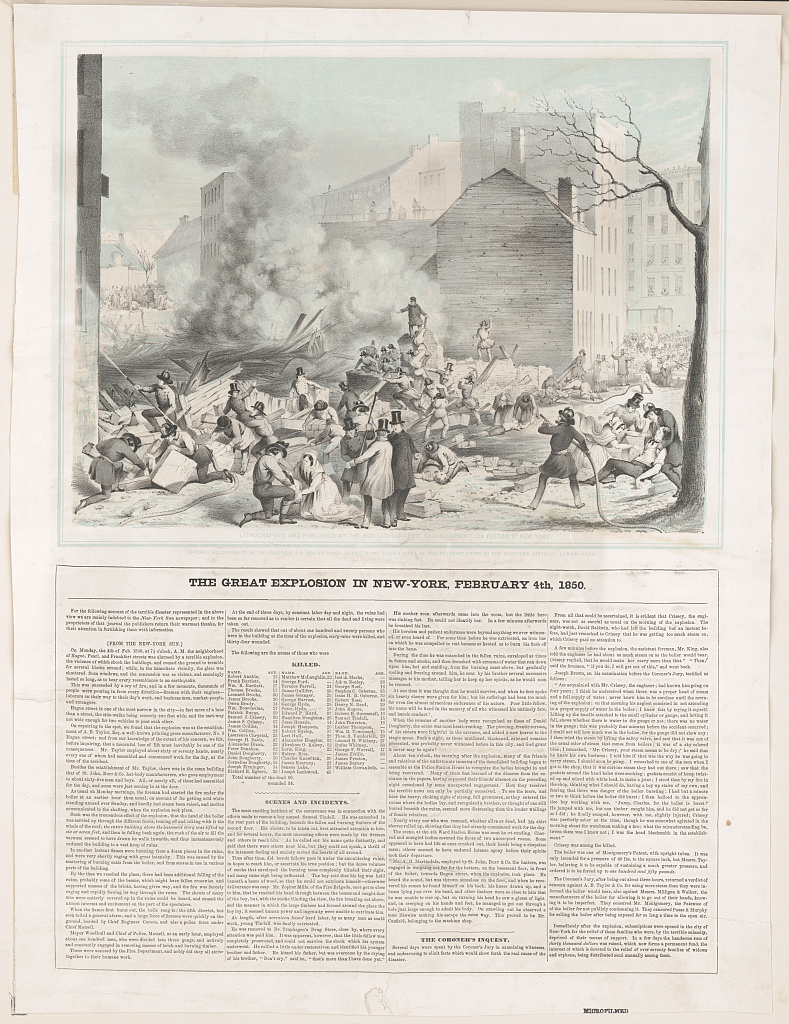
Hague Street explosion

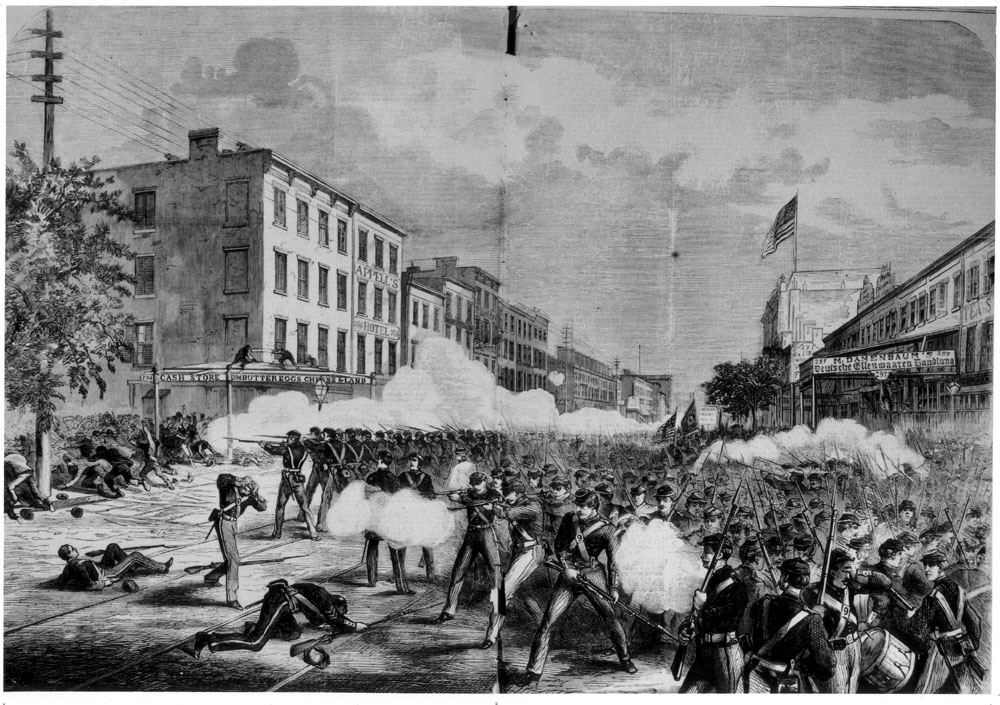
Second Orange Riot

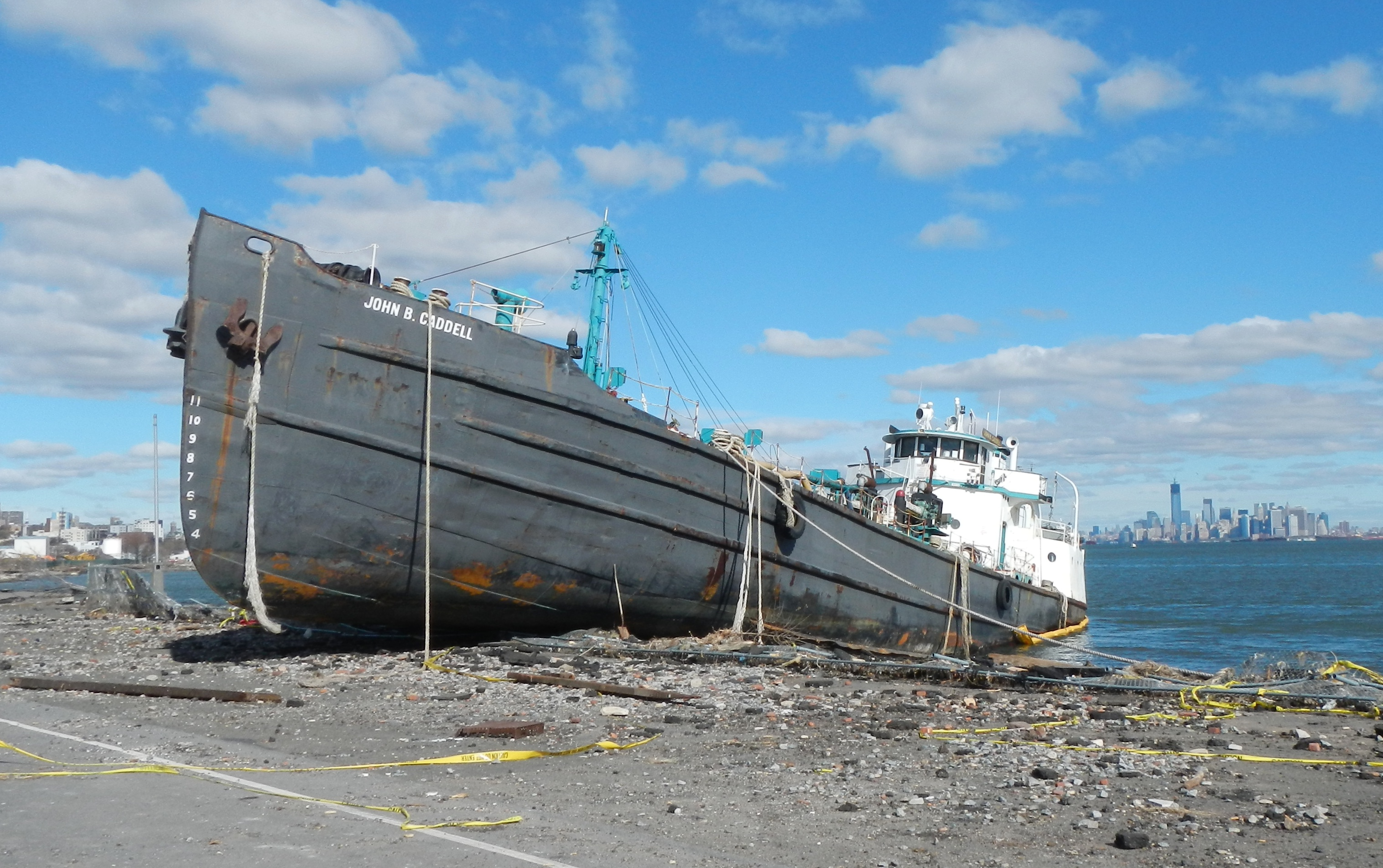
Hurricane Sandy

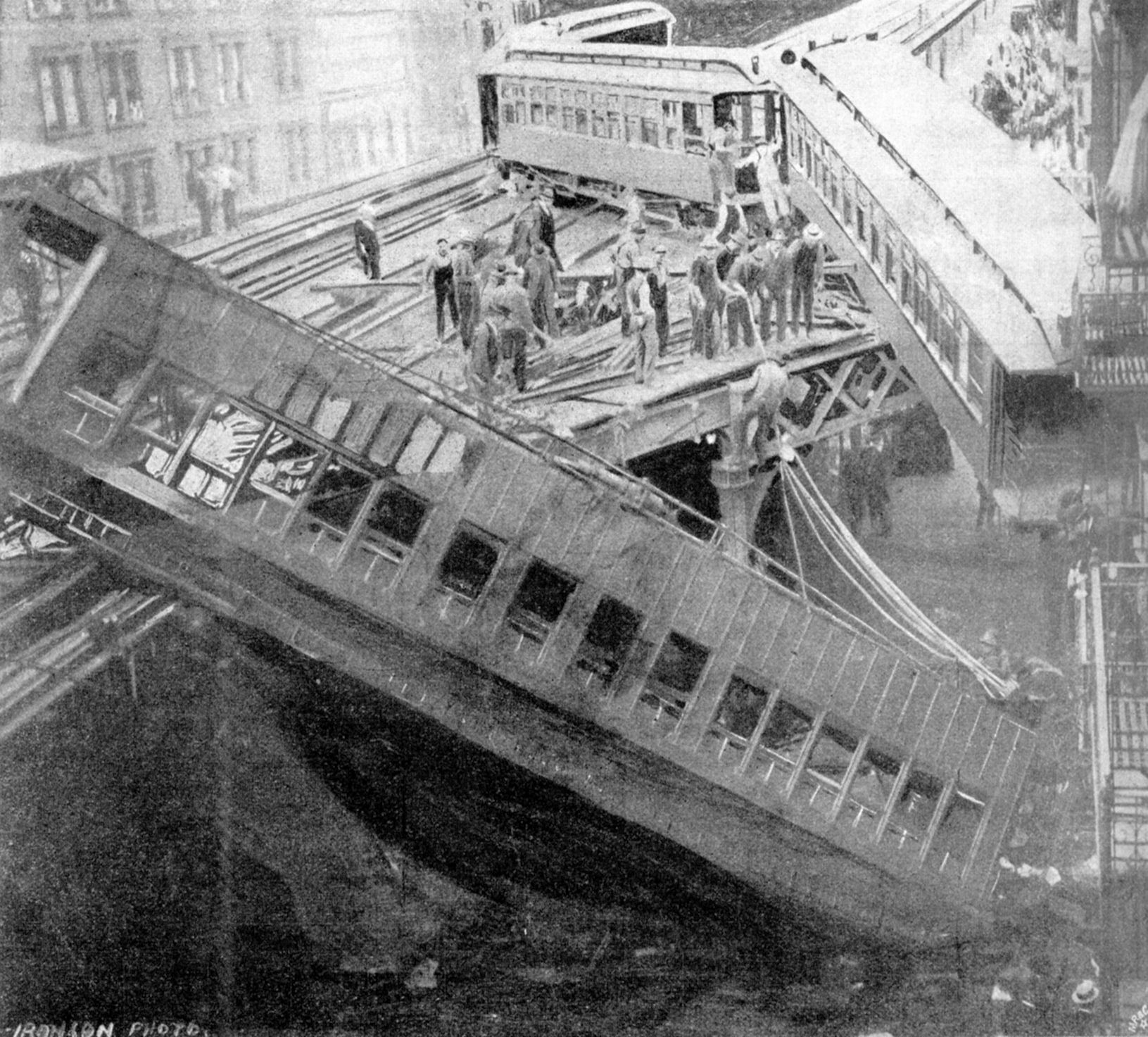
Ninth Avenue derailment

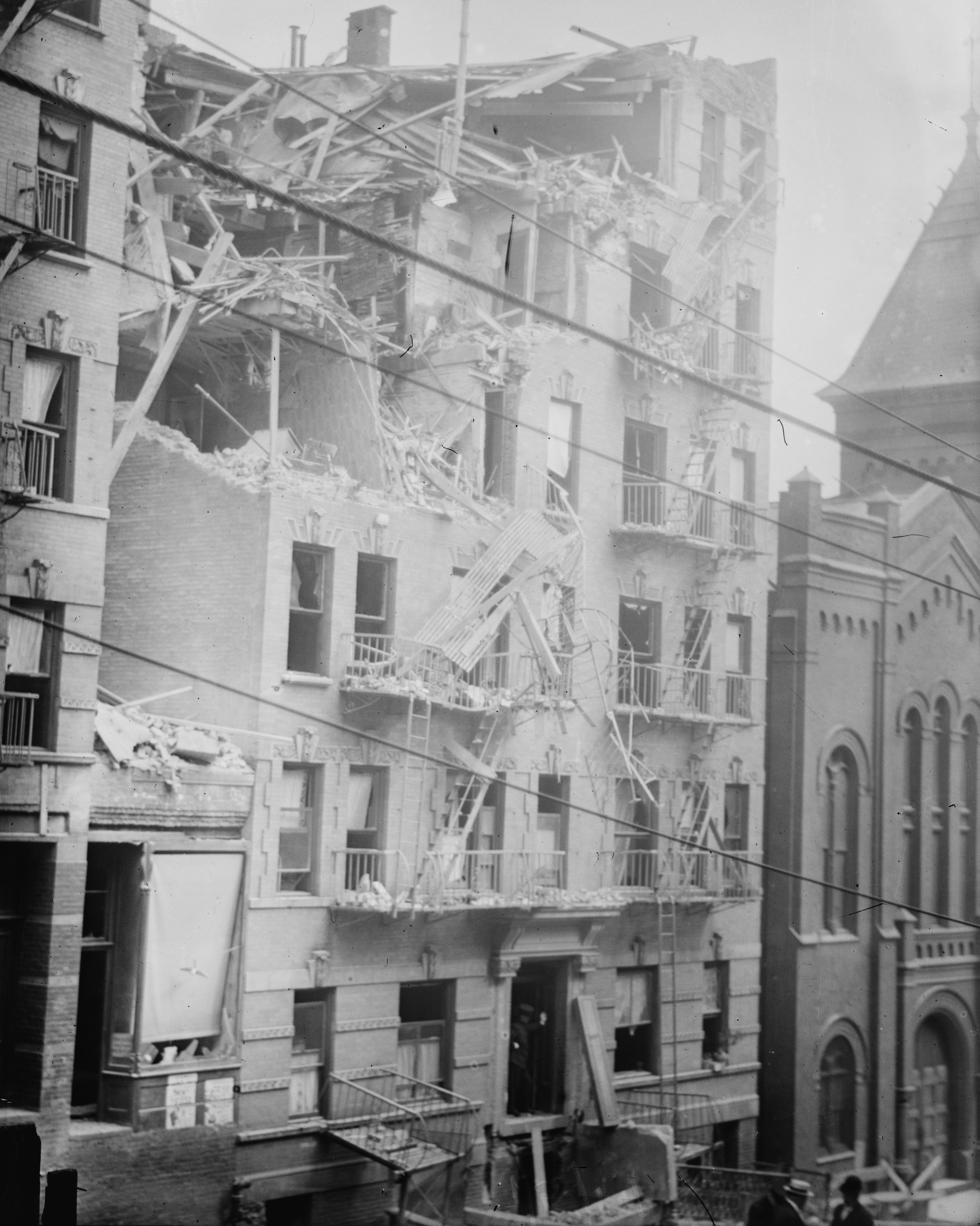
Lexington Avenue explosion

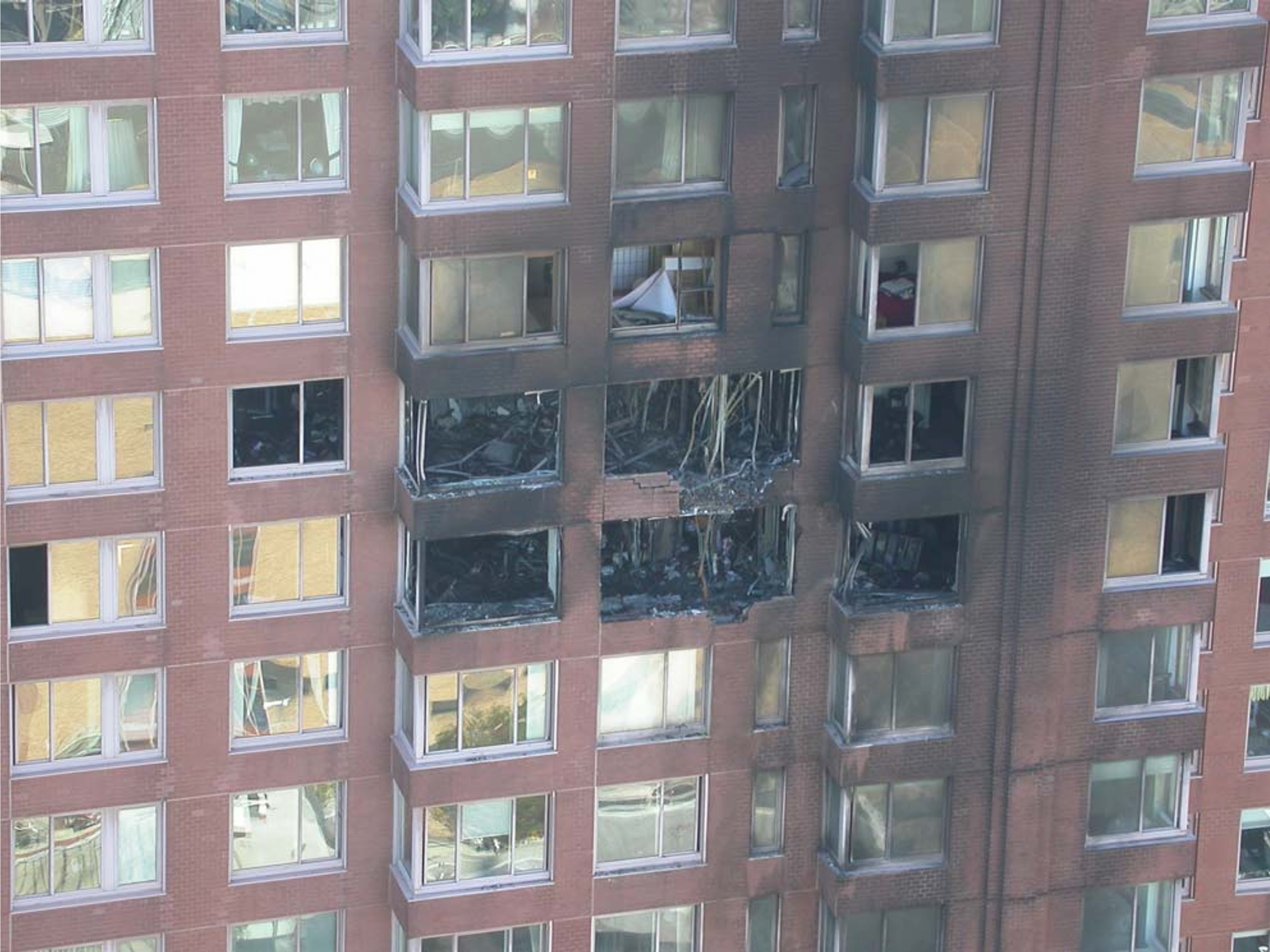
2006 Cirrus SR20 crash

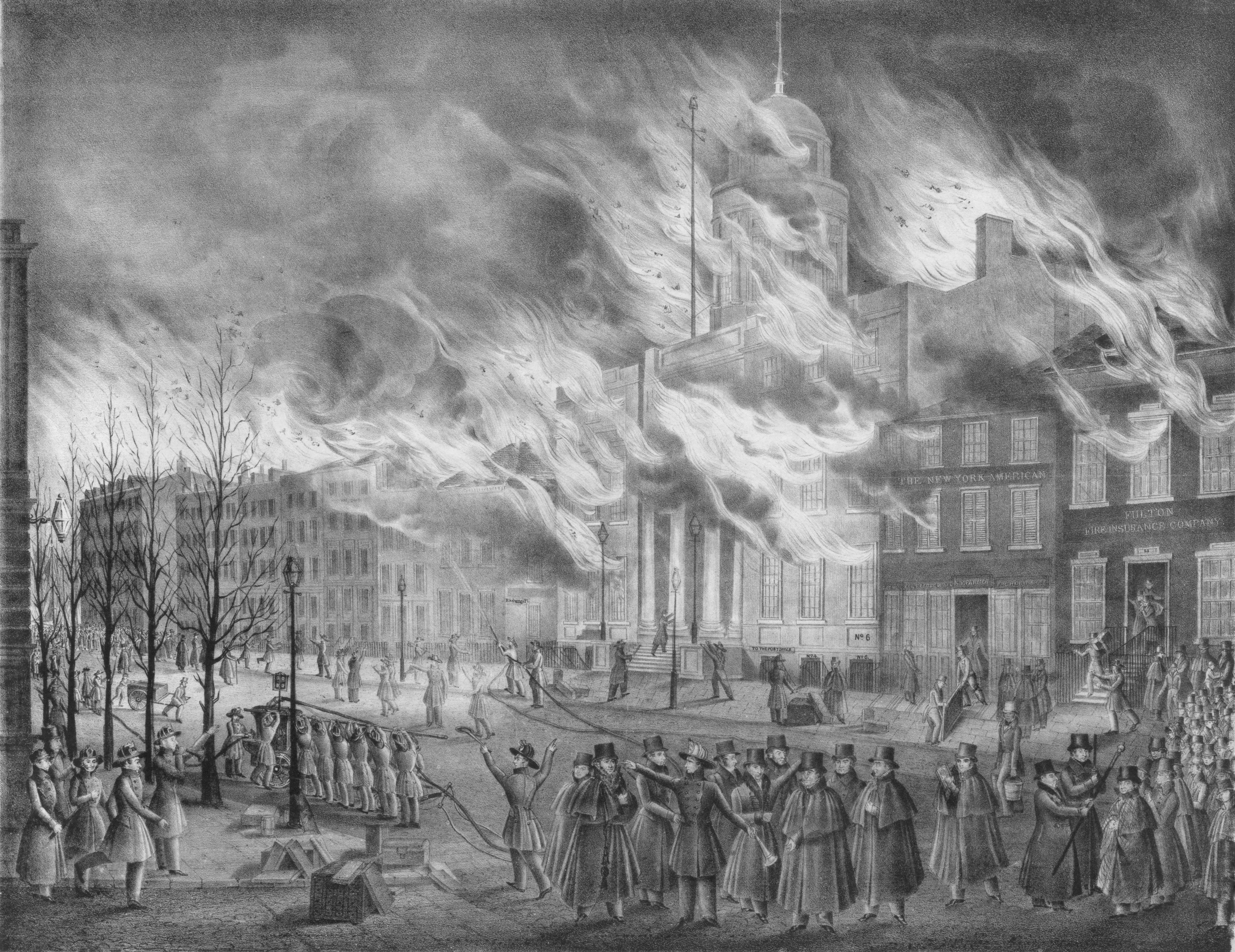
Great Fire of New York (1835)

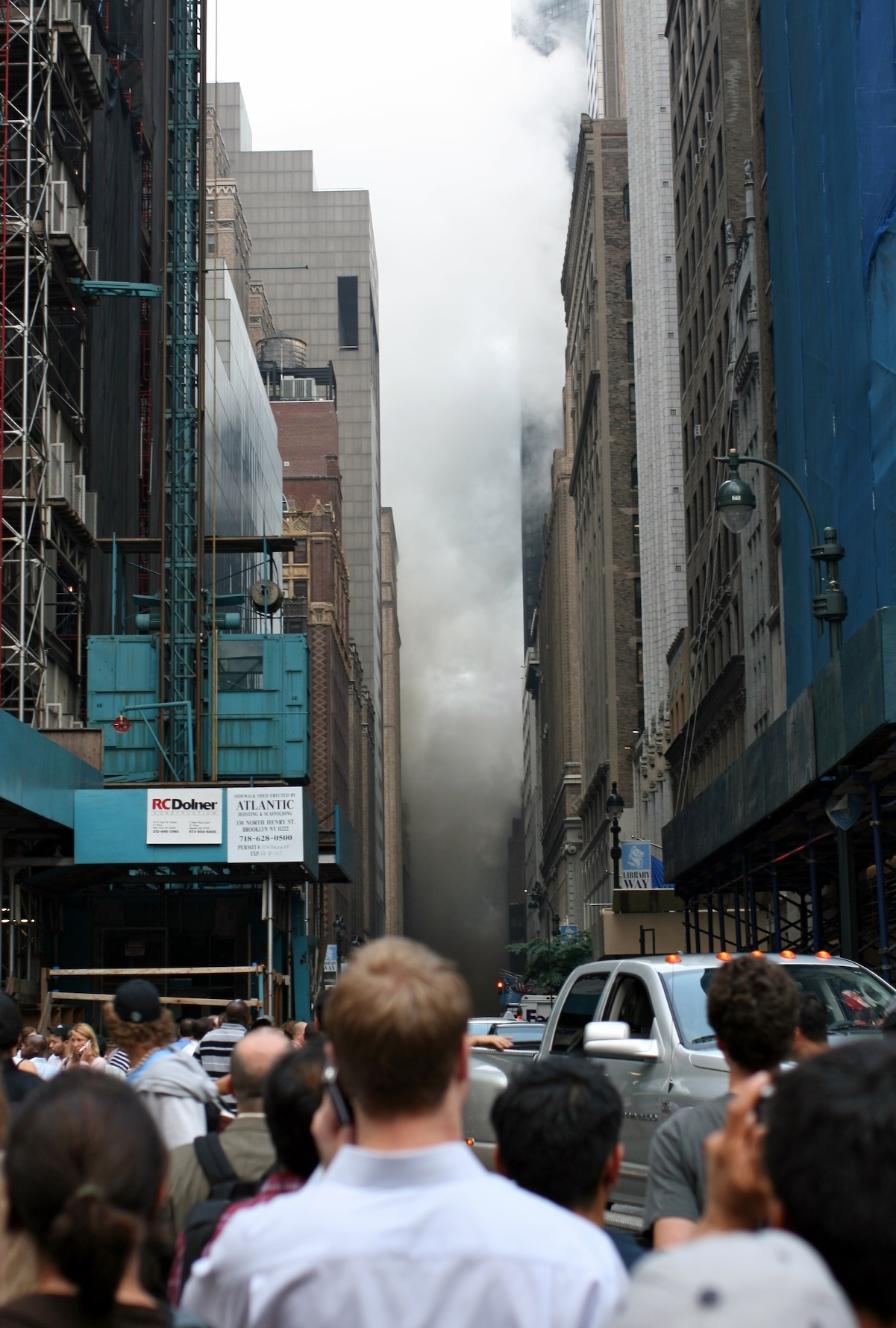
2007 steam explosion

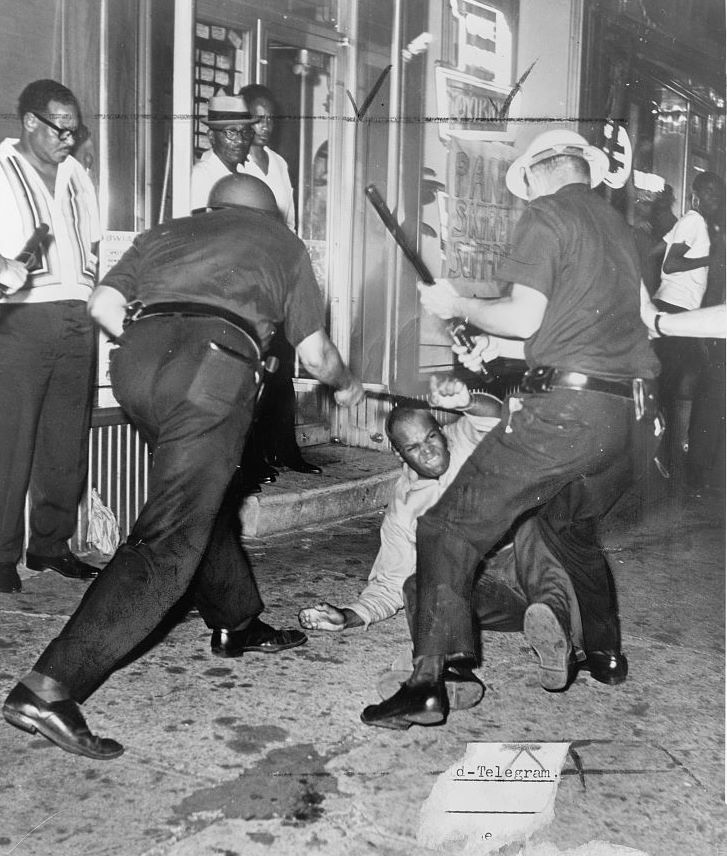
Harlem riot of 1964

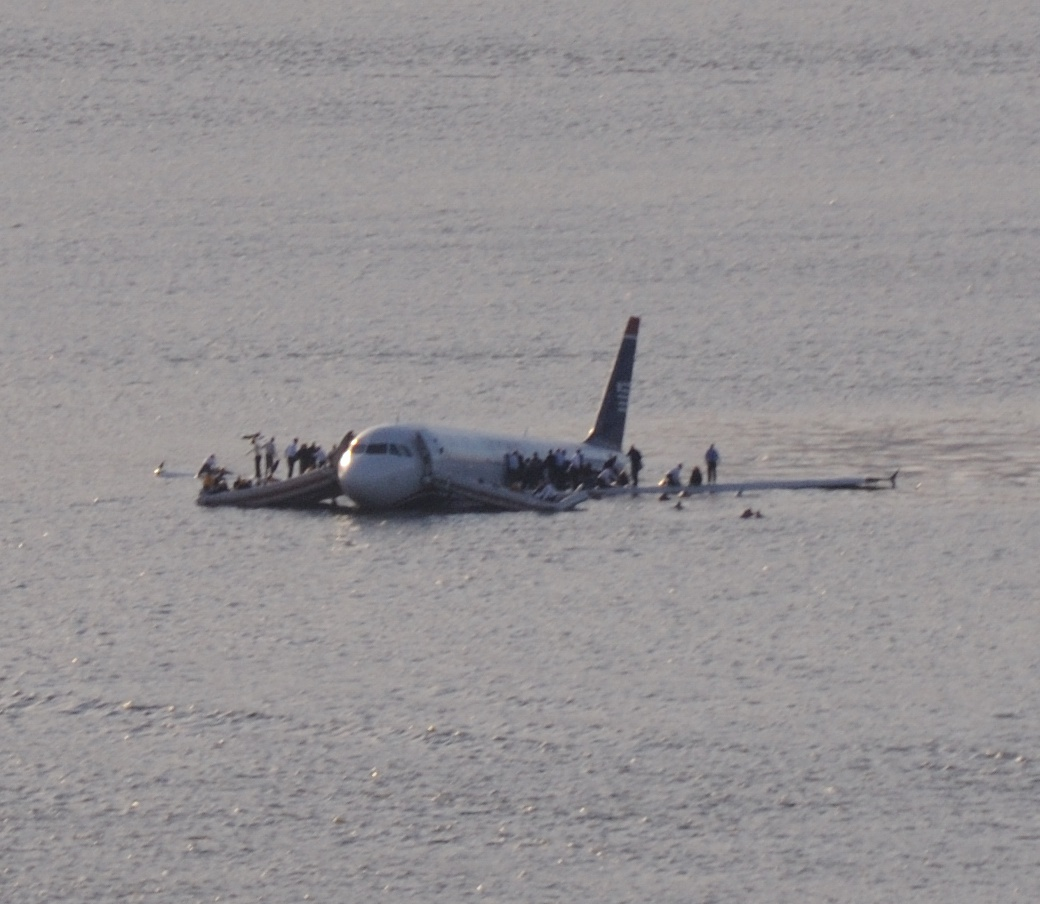
US Airways Flight 1549

This is a list of disasters that have occurred in New York City organized by death toll. The list is general and comprehensive, comprising natural disasters (including epidemics) and man-made disasters both purposeful and accidental. It does not normally include numerous non-notable deadly events such as disease deaths in an ordinary year, nor most deaths due to residential fires, traffic collisions and criminal homicide. Particularly for epidemics, years reflect when the event impacted New York City rather than the world at large.

Year	Event	Type	Death toll	Notes and sources
1982–present	HIV/AIDS epidemic	disease	84,027+	(Note: New York State was on track to announce the end of the HIV/AIDS epidemic in 2020; however, due to an increase in HIV cases during the COVID-19 pandemic, this has been delayed until at least 2024.)
2020–2023	COVID-19 pandemic	disease	38,795–45,194	(Note: Lower limit includes confirmed deaths only; upper limit includes confirmed and probable deaths.)
1918–1919	Spanish flu	disease	20,403–33,000	(Note: Includes deaths from pneumonia, which frequently results from influenza.)
1849	Third cholera pandemic (1st wave)	disease	5,071	
1832	Second cholera pandemic (1st wave)	disease	3,513	
2001	September 11 attacks	terrorism	2,753	
1854	Third cholera pandemic (2nd wave)	disease	2,509	
1798	Yellow fever	disease	2,086	(Note: At least one other source reports only 714 deaths.)
1916	1916 New York City polio epidemic	disease	2,000+	
1872	Smallpox epidemic	disease	1,666	(Note: At least one other source reports 1,866 deaths.)
1896	1896 Eastern North America heat wave	weather	1,300	(Note: The estimated death toll of "nearly 1,300" people is restricted to the (1896) cities of New York and Brooklyn; the heat wave is considered to have killed approximately 1,500 people in total. Other sources put the death toll at around 3,000 people.)
1866	Fourth cholera pandemic	disease	1,137	
1904	General Slocum disaster	maritime	1,021	
1834	Second cholera pandemic (2nd wave)	disease	971	
1972	Heat wave	weather	891	
1795	Yellow fever	disease	732	
1731	Smallpox	disease	549	
1702	Yellow fever	disease	500	
1776	Battle of Long Island	warfare	364	
1963	1963 New York City smog	pollution	300–405	
1876	Brooklyn Theatre fire	fire	278+	(Note: The exact death toll is uncertain, with various sources claiming at least 278, approximately 295 or over 300 people died.)
2001	American Airlines Flight 587 crash	aircraft	265	
1996	TWA Flight 800 explosion	aircraft	230	
1953	1953 New York City smog	pollution	200–260	
1966	1966 New York City smog	pollution	168–400	
1911	Triangle Shirtwaist Factory fire	fire	146	
1776	Battle of Fort Washington	warfare	143	
1840	Lexington fire	maritime	139–154	(Note: Various sources place the death toll at 139, 146, 150 and 154 people.)
1960	Park Slope plane crash	aircraft	134	
1776	Battle of Harlem Heights	warfare	122	
1863	New York City draft riots	mass unrest	119–120	
1975	Eastern Air Lines Flight 66 crash	aircraft	113	
1871	Westfield disaster	maritime	104–125	
1888	Great Blizzard of 1888	weather	100–200	
1918	Malbone Street Wreck	rail	93–102	
1962	American Airlines Flight 1 crash	aircraft	95	
1990	Happy Land fire	fire	87	
1899	Windsor Hotel fire	fire	86	(Note: Death toll includes 45 recovered bodies and 41 missing persons.)
1965	Eastern Air Lines Flight 663 crash	aircraft	84	
1852	Henry Clay Steamboat disaster	maritime	80	
1950	Kew Gardens train crash	rail	78	
1932	Observation explosion	maritime	72	
1732	Yellow fever	disease	70	
1850	Hague Street explosion	explosion	67+	
1959	American Airlines Flight 320 crash	aircraft	65	
1871	Second Orange Riot	mass unrest	62	
1891	Park Place disaster	explosion	61	
2012	Hurricane Sandy	weather	53	
1926	Linseed King	maritime	51–58	
1960	USS Constellation fire at the New York Naval Shipyard	maritime	50	
1947	United Airlines Flight 521 crash	aircraft	43	
1851	Ninth Ward School disaster	fire	43	
1969	February 1969 nor'easter	weather	42	
1973	1973 Staten Island gas explosion	explosion	40	
1643	Massacre at Corlears Hook	warfare	40	
1920	Wall Street bombing	terrorism	38	
1946	Knickerbocker Ice Company disaster	fire	37	
1741	New York Conspiracy of 1741	mass unrest	34	
1966	New York Harbor tanker collision	maritime	33	
1845	Great New York City Fire of 1845	fire	30	
1712	New York Slave Revolt of 1712	mass unrest	29–36	(Note: Death toll includes nine white settlers plus an uncertain number of black slaves. Sources report that 20, 21, 23 or 27 slaves died either by execution or suicide.)
1892	Hotel Royal fire	fire	28	
1992	USAir Flight 405	aircraft	27	
1923	Manhattan State Hospital fire	fire	27	
1954	Alitalia Flight 451 crash	aircraft	26	
1976	Puerto Rican Social Club fire	fire	25	
1962	Eastern Air Lines Flight 512 crash	aircraft	25	
1958	Monarch Underwear Company fire	fire	24	
1880	Seawanhaka disaster	maritime	24–35	
1962	New York Telephone Company boiler explosion	explosion	23	
1849	Astor Place Riot	mass unrest	22–31	
1902	Park Avenue Hotel fire	fire	21	
1908	Gold Street explosion	explosion	20+	
1905	Allen Street tenement fire	fire	20+	
1957	Northeast Airlines Flight 823 crash	aircraft	20	
1860	Elm Street tenement fire	fire	20	
1937	New Brighton tenement collapse	structural collapse	19	
2022	2022 Bronx apartment fire	fire	17	
1885	Glass House disaster	structural collapse	17	
1928	1928 Times Square derailment	rail	16–18	
1895	Ireland Building collapse	structural collapse	16	
1893	1893 Long Island Rail Road collision	rail	16	
1902	Park Avenue Tunnel crash	rail	15–17	
2011	World Wide Tours bus crash	road	15	
1902	Madison Square fireworks explosion	explosion	15	
1883	Church of the Most Holy Redeemer school fire	fire	14–16	
1945	1945 Empire State Building B-25 crash	aircraft	14	
2021	Hurricane Ida	weather	13	
1968	Williamsburg apartment fire	fire	13	
1905	Ninth Avenue derailment	rail	13	
1899	Andrews mansion fire	fire	13	
1877	E. Greenfield candy factory fire	fire	13	
2017	2017 Bronx apartment fire	fire	12	
1970	1970 New York City gas explosion	explosion	12	
1966	23rd Street Fire	fire	12	
1915	Diamond Candy Company fire	fire	12	
1883	1883 Brooklyn Bridge stampede	mass unrest	12	
2003	2003 Staten Island Ferry crash	maritime	11	
1975	LaGuardia Airport bombing	terrorism	11	
1970	Trans International Airlines Flight 863 crash	aircraft	11	
1929	Pathé Studios fire	fire	11	
1854	W. T. Jennings fire	fire	11	
1984	Palm Sunday massacre	homicide	10	
1956	Bush Terminal explosion	explosion	10	
1938	1938 New England hurricane	weather	10	
1910	Grand Central Station explosion	explosion	10	
2009	Hudson River mid-air collision	aircraft	9	
1991	City College stampede	mass unrest	9	
1977	Everard Baths fire	fire	9	
1894	Newtown Creek Bridge disaster	structural collapse	9	
2026	New York City building collapse	structural collapse	8	
2017	New York City truck attack	terrorism	8	
2014	East Harlem gas explosion	explosion	8	
1995	Freddy's Fashion Mart attack	homicide	8	
1932	Ritz Tower Hotel fire and explosion	explosion	8	
1923	1923 Brooklyn elevated train crash	rail	8	
1902	1902 New York City Subway explosion	explosion	8	
1870	First Orange Riot	mass unrest	8	
1882	1882 Spuyten Duyvil train wreck	rail	8	
1857	Dead Rabbits riot	mass unrest	8	
2008	2008 Manhattan crane collapse	structural collapse	7	
1915	1915 New York City Subway explosion	explosion	6–25	
1917	Domino Sugar Refinery explosion	explosion	6–12	
2025	2025 Hudson River helicopter crash	aircraft	6	
1993	World Trade Center Bombing	terrorism	6	
1978	Waldbaum's fire	fire	6	
1967	1967 New York City freight train collision	rail	6	
1962	Queens soap plant fire	fire	6	
1943	Harlem riot of 1943	mass unrest	6	
1912	Equitable Life Building fire	fire	6	
1891	1891 New York City train collision	rail	6	
2018	2018 New York City helicopter crash	aircraft	5	
1991	Union Square derailment	rail	5	
1977	Pan Am Building helicopter crash	aircraft	5	
1959	American Airlines Flight 514	aircraft	5	
1952	1952 Queens plane crash	aircraft	5	
1946	40 Wall Street plane crash	aircraft	5	
1901	1901 Staten Island Ferry crash	maritime	4–5	
2025	2025 Midtown Manhattan shooting	homicide	4	
2013	December 2013 Spuyten Duyvil derailment	rail	4	
1975	Fraunces Tavern bombing	terrorism	4	
1973	Broadway Central Hotel collapse	structural collapse	4	
1947	North American blizzard of 1947	weather	4	
1929	1929 New York City Subway collision	rail	4	
1914	Lexington Avenue explosion	terrorism	4	
1691	Leisler's Rebellion	warfare	4	(Note: Death toll includes two killed in battle and two subsequently executed.)
2025	Brooklyn club shooting	homicide	3	
1788	Doctors' riot	mass unrest	3–20	
1989	Gramercy Park asbestos steam explosion	explosion	3	
1970	Greenwich Village townhouse explosion	terrorism	3	
1946	1946 St. George Terminal fire	fire	3	
1935	Harlem riot of 1935	mass unrest	3	
2026	Air Canada Express Flight 8646	aircraft	2	
2015	East Village gas explosion	explosion	2	
2006	2006 New York City Cirrus SR20 crash	aircraft	2	
1991	Crown Heights riot	mass unrest	2	
1989	USAir Flight 5050 crash	aircraft	2	
1958	1958 East River collision	maritime	2	
1947	1947 New York City smallpox outbreak	disease	2	
1929	1929 Yankee Stadium stampede	mass unrest	2	
1835	Great Fire of New York	fire	2	
2020	2020 New York City Subway fire	rail	1	
2019	2019 New York City helicopter crash	aircraft	1	
2007	2007 New York City steam explosion	explosion	1	
1995	Williamsburg Bridge subway collision	rail	1	
1964	Harlem riot of 1964	mass unrest	1	
1956	Sylvania Electric Products explosion	explosion	1	
1949	Holland Tunnel fire	fire	1	
1942	SS Normandie	maritime	1	
1915	1915 New York City Subway fire	rail	1	
1770	Battle of Golden Hill	warfare	0–1	
2009	US Airways Flight 1549 crash	aircraft	0	
1975	Overseas National Airways Flight 032	aircraft	0	
1969	1969 New York City gas explosion	explosion	0	
1919	1919 Standard Oil Company fire	fire	0	
1866–present	Greenpoint oil spill	pollution	unknown	(Note: The spill was discovered in 1978. Cleanup operations are ongoing.)
1776	Great Fire of New York	fire	unknown	(Note: The city had already been largely evacuated due to American Revolutionary War.)
1655	Peach War	warfare	unknown	(Note: Various sources report 100 Dutch settlers killed across Hoboken (in modern day New Jersey), Pavonia (now Jersey City, New Jersey), Staten Island and New Amsterdam (Lower Manhattan), along with 150 taken hostage. The number killed in what comprises New York City today is unknown, although one self-published source reports zero deaths in New Amsterdam. The number of Native Americans killed is unknown.)
1643–1645	Kieft's War	warfare	unknown	(Note: The year 1642 became known as "the year of blood" among Dutch colonists. Historian John Romeyn Brodhead described the Native American revolt as a "devastating tide" that "rolled over the island of Manhattan itself. From its northern extremity to the Kolck [southern tip], there were now no more than five or six bouweries [large farms] left; and these were 'threatened by the Indians every night with fire, and by day with the slaughter of people and cattle.'")

== See also ==
- List of accidents and disasters by death toll
- List of natural disasters by death toll
- List of disasters in the United States by death toll
