= List of accidents and incidents at John F. Kennedy International Airport =

John F. Kennedy International Airport has been the site of many aviation accidents and incidents.

== 1952 ==
5 April
A Curtiss C-46 Commando operating for US Airlines, leased from the USAF, a cargo flight with two occupants inbound from Raleigh-Durham International Airport, crashed 4.4 miles north of Idlewild tower in heavy rain and overcast conditions at the intersection of 169 Street and 89th Avenue in Jamaica, Queens, New York. Both occupants were killed and three on the ground also died. Cause of the accident was a loss of control following a sudden engine failure caused by a deteriorated fuel feed valve during an attempted missed approach.

== 1953 ==
19 October
An Eastern Air Lines flight from Idlewild International Airport (the former name of JFK) to San Juan, Puerto Rico, a Lockheed L-749A Constellation, N119A, crashed on take-off. Two passengers were killed.

== 1954 ==
18 December
Linee Aeree Italiane Flight 451, a Douglas DC-6, crashed on its fourth approach attempt to land at Idlewild, after circling for 2.5 hours. Twenty-six of the 32 passengers on board were killed.

== 1958 ==
10 November
Vickers Viscount CF-TGL of Trans-Canada Air Lines was destroyed by fire after it was struck by Lockheed L-749 Constellation N6503C of Seaboard & Western Airlines which had crashed on take-off.

== 1960 ==
16 December
A United Airlines Douglas DC-8 and a TWA Lockheed Super Constellation collided; the DC-8 crashed in Park Slope, Brooklyn, the Super Constellation on Staten Island, killing all 128 people on board both airliners and six on the ground.

== 1961 ==
19 January
Aeronaves de México Flight 401, a Douglas DC-8-21 with 97 passengers and 9 crew on board bound for Mexico City, crashed and burned after aborting takeoff from Runway 07R in marginally bad weather, there was snow on the runway, 4 crew members were killed.

== 1962 ==
1 March
American Airlines Flight 1, a Boeing 707 crashed on takeoff from Idlewild after its rudder jammed. All 87 passengers and 8 crew members were killed.

30 November
Eastern Air Lines Flight 512, a Douglas DC-7, crashed into the ground during a missed approach, killing 25 of the 51 on board.

== 1963 ==
4 October
New York Airways Flight 600, a Boeing Vertol 107 helicopter, crashed shortly after takeoff from Idlewild Airport (now JFK) en route to Newark via Wall Street. All three passengers and all three crew members died. The accident was blamed on a mechanical failure due to contaminated lubricants.

== 1965 ==
8 February
Eastern Air Lines Flight 663, a Douglas DC-7, crashed off Jones Beach after takeoff when the pilots found themselves on an apparent collision course with an inbound Pan Am Boeing 707 and made evasive maneuvers. All 84 passengers and crew perished.

== 1969 ==
15 July
A New York Airways de Havilland Canada DHC-6 Twin Otter with 11 passengers and 3 crew bound for Newark International Airport lost control and crashed after taking off from a runway intersection, encountering wake turbulence from a recently departed jet, 2 crew members and 1 passenger were killed.

== 1970 ==
8 September
Trans International Airlines Flight 863, a DC-8-63CF ferry flight to Dulles International Airport, crashed on takeoff from runway 13R, killing all 11 crew members on board. The DC-8 freighter started rotating in a nose-high attitude 1,500 feet (460 m) into the take-off. After becoming airborne at 2,800 feet (850 m) down the runway, the aircraft climbed to about 300–500 feet, rolled 20 degrees to the left, crashed and caught fire. The loss of pitch control was caused by the entrapment of a pointed, asphalt-covered object between the leading edge of the right elevator and the right horizontal spar web access door in the aft part of the stabilizer.

== 1973 ==
23 June
Loftleiðir Icelandic Douglas DC-8 (registered N8960T) was damaged in a tail-first landing at John F. Kennedy International Airport, when it completed Flight 509 on the Stockholm-Oslo-Reykjavík-New York route with 119 passengers and nine crew members on board. An NTSB investigation found that the accident was caused by a flawed procedure when the spoilers were extended (right after touchdown rather than once the landing gear had been lowered).

== 1975 ==
24 June
Eastern Air Lines Flight 66, a Boeing 727 on final approach from New Orleans, crashed into the runway lights short of runway 22L, killing 113 passengers and crew. The cause of the crash was wind shear during a heavy thunderstorm.

12 November
Overseas National Airways Flight 032, a McDonnell Douglas DC-10-30, struck a flock of sea gulls during takeoff, crashing past Taxiway Z. All 129 passengers and 10 crew members escaped successfully while the aircraft was destroyed. The cause of the accident was determined to have been seagulls, which struck the landing gear and the right engine, resulting in an uncontained engine failure.

== 1984 ==
28 February
Scandinavian Airlines System Flight 901, a McDonnell Douglas DC-10-30 with 163 passengers and 14 crew on board arriving from Oslo, Norway overran runway 4R on landing in low visibility and wound up in shallow water 200 meters from the end of the runway, injuring 12 passengers. The cause of the accident was the crew's failure to monitor their airspeed and overreliance on the aircraft's autothrottle. Although substantially damaged, the plane was later repaired and returned to service.

== 1990 ==
25 January
Avianca Flight 52, a Boeing 707-321B arriving from Bogotá and Medellin, crashed at Cove Neck, Long Island, after a missed approach to runway 22L at JFK and subsequently running out of fuel. 73 passengers and crew perished while 85 survived.

== 1992 ==
30 July
TWA Flight 843, a Lockheed L-1011 TriStar departing for San Francisco, aborted takeoff shortly after liftoff. There were no fatalities among the 280 passengers and 12 crew, although the aircraft was destroyed.

== 1993 ==
11 February
Lufthansa Flight 592, an Airbus A310 from Frankfurt, was hijacked by an Ethiopian man seeking asylum in the United States, landed at JFK. The hijacker surrendered.

== 1996 ==
17 July
TWA Flight 800 was a Boeing 747-100 that exploded and crashed into the Atlantic Ocean near East Moriches, New York, at about 8:31 p.m. EDT, 12 minutes after takeoff from John F. Kennedy International Airport on a scheduled international passenger flight to Rome, with a stopover in Paris. All 230 people on board died in the third-deadliest aviation accident in U.S. history.

== 1999 ==
31 October
Egyptair Flight 990 was a Boeing 767-300ER that crashed 200 miles east of JFK after departing, while en route to Cairo, Egypt, killing all 217 occupants on board. The NTSB joined with the FBI and ECAA. the NTSB determined the probable cause was the result of the aircraft's departure from cruise and subsequent impact with the Atlantic Ocean, as a result of the first officer's intentional inputs. However, the ECAA´s final report stated the probable cause to be a mechanical malfunction in the aircraft's elevator. Both sides disputed this.

== 2001 ==
12 November
American Airlines Flight 587, an Airbus A300, crashed a few kilometers away from JFK, while en route to Santo Domingo in the Dominican Republic. During climb, the first officer's overuse of rudder controls in response to wake turbulence from a Japan Airlines Boeing 747-400 that took off minutes before it, caused the vertical fin to snap. The plane crashed into the Belle Harbor neighborhood of Queens. The crash killed all 260 people on the plane and five people on the ground.

== 2011 ==
11 April
Air France Flight 007, operated with an Airbus A380, collided with Delta Connection Flight 6293, a Bombardier CRJ 701, while the Airbus was taxiing for takeoff from JFK. None of the passengers or crew members on either airplane were injured.

== 2014 ==
5 December
In December 2014, Cho Hyu-ah, the daughter of the then Korean Air chairman, Cho An, ordered the pilot of a Korean Air to taxi back to the gate. The reason for this is the flight attendant had served peanuts to her in packaging as opposed to on a plate. Cho was later arrested by authorities and later resigned. Later it was found out that Cho acted the same way on another flight in 2013.

== 2018 ==
11 September
Air India Flight 101, a Boeing 777-300ER, developed a multiple system failure while landing at JFK. The aircraft's ILS (Instrument Landing System) and TCAS system had failed at final approach into JFK. The crippled aircraft was diverted to Newark Liberty International Airport and the aircraft safely landed there.

== 2020 ==
6 December
Aeroflot Flight 102, a passenger flight with the plane tail number of VQ-BIL coming from Moscow to New York, received a bomb threat that caused the temporary closure of a runway and the delay of Aeroflot Flight 103, a return flight back to Moscow. The bomb threat in question was published from a Twitter account that was compromised by hackers with the aliases of "Omnipotent" and "choonkeat".

== 2022 ==
17 June
ITA Airways Flight 611, an Airbus A330-202 (Registration EI-EJL) made contact with Air France Flight 008, a Boeing 777-228ER (Registration F-GSPQ) during taxi for takeoff at New York-JFK International Airport. At the time the flight crew of AFR008 had stopped with the parking brake set while waiting for the gate personnel to finish preparing gate 9 to receive their flight at Terminal 1. About the time the tug arrived, the crew said they felt the airplane move due to a "hard connection", but they were unaware of an airplane passing behind at that time. Maintenance informed the flight crew of damage to the elevator, and it was determined to be from the ITA Airways A330 that had passed behind. The Air France flight crew said they tried to contact the Air Traffic Control to stop the ITA Airways flight, but the ITA Airways flight 611 took off without receiving notification of the collision. On the Departure, New York TRACON controllers informed AZ611, reporting: "Another aircraft on the ground currently, Air France, said you hit them or something of that nature while you were taxiing. Did you experience any damage to the aircraft?" The ITA Airways pilot responded "Negative, sir." The flight continued to Rome and landed uneventfully; F-GSPQ was ferried to Paris on July 12.

== 2023 ==
13 January
A near-collision occurred when American Airlines Flight 106 crossed Runway 4L while Delta Air Lines Flight 1943 was using it for takeoff. After being warned by the air traffic controllers, Flight 1943 successfully aborted its takeoff after slamming on the brakes and stopped 1,000 feet (330 yd; 300 m) away from the intersection. The flight returned to the gate and was delayed overnight. The NTSB determined that the American Airlines crew were instructed to taxi to 4L via B, and hold short of Kilo. The Ground Controller then gave AAL106 clearance to cross 31L at Kilo. They read this back. Instead, the AAL crew kept going on Juliet and crossed 4L. The ASDE-X system in the Kennedy Tower cab alerted the Local Controller to a safety alert. The NTSB determines the probable cause to this incident is the loss of situational awareness of the AAL 106 crew. Contributing factors include the failure of the Ground controller not noticing the deviation of taxi, timing of the runway safety light system. The FAA issued multiple recommendations to prevent an incident like this.

30 October
JetBlue Flight 1401, a flight from John F. Kennedy International Airport to Fort Lauderdale–Hollywood International Airport, suffered a fire prior to takeoff after a portable charger exploded inside the backpack of a passenger. No one was injured.

9 November
An Air Atlanta Icelandic Flight 4592 operated by CM Airlines, to Liège Airport in Belgium, diverted back to the airport, dumping more than 45,000 lbs of fuel, after one of its horses broke free from its horse stall.

== 2024 ==
5 April
After an earthquake in central New Jersey about 50 miles west of JFK, the Federal Aviation Administration temporarily stopped all New York and North Jersey airport operations for two hours.

17 April
A SWISS flight bound to Zurich had to cancel their takeoff in order to prevent a collision after four other aircraft, belonging to American Airlines, Delta and Republic, were cleared to cross runway 4L while the Swiss flight was departing on it. With the ATC not aware of it, they gave Delta flight DL668 clearance to land on 4L, while the SWISS A330 was still on it.

24 July
A fire broke out in Concourse C of Terminal 8 at 7 in the morning when an escalator caught fire, sending smoke through the terminal. Ten were injured and the terminal was evacuated, with flights being canceled. Operations resumed an hour after the fire was extinguished.
