= Pathé Studios fire =

Multiple fatalities, New York City

The Pathé Studios fire of December 10, 1929, in New York City, killed 11 people and gutted the building. The fire coincided with the beginning of a larger retreat in film production in New York and New Jersey. It was the worst film-studio disaster in U.S. history.

== Description ==
Pathé Studios was a "two-story brick building located at the corner of 134th Street and Park Avenue" that had been used for filmmaking since 1919. In 1928 it was remodeled and offered for rent under the name Manhattan Studios. In September 1928, Pathé and FBO head Joseph P. Kennedy put Robert Kane in charge of production at the studio, and per film historian Richard Koszarski, it is "remarkable how much footage Kane was able to generate in this cramped facility during 1929, most of it photographed by veteran cameramen Harry Stradling and Phil Tannura." Kane left in October 1929, "to run the new Pathé-Natan sound studio outside of Paris, taking several key staff members with him." He was replaced by production manager Fred Lalley, but "the Motion Picture Herald reported that 'John C. Flinn, vice-president of Pathé, is the real voice behind what happens at the studio.'"

Lalley began production on, among other films, a two-reeler called The Black and White Revue, from a series called Harry Delmar's Melody Comedies, a mish-mash of vaudeville-style comedy acts and dance-hall girls. The fire was started on the set of The Black and White Revue at Pathé Studios when an incandescent bulb ignited some fabric used on the set of a musical film. It was 9 a.m. on Tuesday, December 10, 1929, when an "enormous sun arc" started a fire on a 25' x 20' velvet curtain, while the band rehearsed downstairs and the dancers were in their dressing rooms on the balcony level above. The curtain had the dual purpose of baffling sound for the new talking pictures and hiding a storage area full of "unused scenery, papier-mâché props, and half-empty paint cans." On orders from the assistant director, the crew tore down the burning curtain, which promptly ignited everything nearby. The assistant director ran to warn the dancers on the balcony; two electricians tried to turn on the fire hose but were trampled before they could open the valve, one was later found dead at the bottom of the stairs. Among the 11 victims were "four chorus girls, a prop man, a bookkeeper, three electricians, and a makeup man," who had gone back into the building looking a woman who worked in wardrobe (she had already escaped). The fire spread so fast that by the time many heard the noise and noticed the smoke, "flames were already licking at the nearby fire escapes." It was the worst film studio disaster in U.S. history.

The New York Board of Underwriters report on the fire noted that "the production of sound pictures has developed an additional hazard in the use of considerable quantities of draperies, property, and sound-deadening material." The building was only required to have fire sprinklers if more than five tins of nitrate film were stored on site. Flinn and Lalley were arrested for second-degree murder when 140 tins were found in the building but a grand jury later dropped the charges. The film was finished at Fort Lee and released as Sixteen Sweeties.

In part because of increased regulation and in part because of changing audience taste, many smaller film production companies in the New York area shut down in the year following the fire.

== See also ==
- List of disasters in New York City by death toll

== Sources ==
- Koszarski, Richard (2002). "Laughter, Music and Tragedy at the New York Pathé Studio". Film History. 14 (1): 32–39. ISSN 0892-2160.
- Thompson, Emily Ann (2002). The soundscape of modernity: architectural acoustics and the culture of listening in America, 1900–1933. Cambridge, Massachusetts: MIT Press. ISBN 978-0-262-20138-4.
