= City College stampede =

1991 crowd crush event in City College of New York

- Date: December 28, 1991
- Time: c. 7:00 p.m. (EST)
- Venue: City College of New York gymnasium
- Location: New York City, US; 40.8194°N 73.9500°W
- Type: Crowd crush
- Deaths: 9
- Injuries: 29

The City College (CCNY) stampede was a crowd crush event on December 28, 1991, in the City College of New York gymnasium during a charity basketball game organized and promoted by hip hop celebrities P. Diddy and Heavy D. Nearly 5,000 people tried to pack into the gymnasium, which could fit 2,730 people. Outside, people broke through at least one glass door leading to the gymnasium lobby. The crowd rushed the lobby and down a short staircase that led to the gymnasium. However, doors at the bottom of the stairs opened inward into the lobby, not outward into the gymnasium. The doors were left closed for up to 15 minutes as the crush worsened. Nine people were crushed to death at the bottom of the staircase, while 29 others were injured.

== Background ==
Billed as "the first annual Heavy D and Puff Daddy Celebrity Charity basketball game", the event was promoted heavily on Kiss 98.7 FM, a soul and R&B station in New York City. Tickets were $12 in advance and $20 at the door, with the flyers stating a portion of the proceeds would be donated to an AIDS education group. Participating in the game as players included Michael Bivins, Boyz II Men, Run D.M.C., Redhead Kingpin, EPMD, Phife Dawg, Big Daddy Kane, Jodeci, and Ed Lover from Yo! MTV Raps.

== Timeline ==
=== Build-up ===
Doors to the Nat Holman Gymnasium were set to open at 5 p.m. At approximately 5:30 p.m., the doors closed with hundreds of people still outside. Nearly 5,000 people were trying to get into a gymnasium that had a maximum capacity of 2,730 people.

=== Stampede ===
List of deaths

- Darren Brown, 28, The Bronx
- Yul Dargan, 24, The Bronx
- Laytesha Heard, 19, The Bronx
- Dawn McCaine, 20, Brooklyn
- Leonard Nelson Jr., 17, The Bronx
- Charise Ann Noel, 26, Brooklyn
- Jabaal Rainey, 15, Harlem
- Dirk Swain, 20, The Bronx
- Sonya Williams, 20, New Rochelle

Before the basketball game began, at approximately 7 p.m., people who had not been let in broke a glass door and swarmed towards the entrance of the gym. The crowd went down a short staircase that led to the gymnasium. However, doors at the bottom of the stairs opened inward into the lobby, not outward into the gymnasium. The doors were left closed for up to 15 minutes as the crush worsened. It was estimated that victims were asphyxiated between 7 p.m. and 7:15 p.m., and the police stated they were not able to see the crush at the base of the stairwell from their position on the first floor.

All of the people killed were from the New York City area. The death toll was initially eight, but increased to nine after 20-year old Dawn McCaine died at St. Luke's Hospital on January 1, 1992, after being removed from life support. 29 people were injured.

=== Immediate response ===
Two 911 calls were received at 7:14 p.m., one of them reporting shots fired. Ambulance response was mistakenly canceled after a police sergeant on scene reported there was no gunfire at the scene. An ambulance was not dispatched until 7:22 p.m., and arrived at the scene at 7:28 p.m.

A witness reported that an announcement was made over the intercom system stating the basketball game would not be going forward due to several deaths outside. People then fled the scene en masse.

In the immediate aftermath of the stampede, Mayor David Dinkins and Police Commissioner Lee Brown, among other officials, traveled to the site. Dinkins called an emergency meeting for the next day, with representatives from the college, EMS, the medical examiner, police, fire, and the city.

== Aftermath ==
=== Grief and outrage ===
Funerals for victims of the stampede were attended by hundreds of mourners. At the service in memory of Sonya Williams, reverend Al Sharpton and minister Louis Farrakhan were present. Boxer Mike Tyson, who had been at the gymnasium when the stampede occurred, also attended. Mourners expressed anger about what they felt was an "easily preventable disaster."

An interfaith memorial service was held on January 12 outside the gymnasium.

=== Discussions of culpability ===
In a statement at City Hall, Black community activist Al Sharpton criticized those in the crowd who had broken a glass door to forcibly enter the building and swarmed past ticket collectors. He said, "We are ashamed of those young people [who] conducted themselves in a way that hurt innocent young people." He led a rally of about 400 people to promote Black self-respect. Beginning at P.S. 175, he led a march to City College. There, accompanied by State Senator David Paterson and civil rights activist C. Vernon Mason, Sharpton acknowledged the perceived failings of police and security but also asked for increased community accountability.

Writing for the Associated Press, Rick Hampson wrote that although victims' families had variously blamed police, college administrators, and promoters for the incident, a "gang of rowdy youths" bore the real responsibility for the incident.

City College alleged that student leader Cassandra Kirnon misled them about who was performing at the event. However Jean Charles, the director of the student center, admitted in interviews that he did not ask Kirnon key questions about how the event would be planned, advertised, and executed.

In an interview with Newsday, Sean Combs (then known as Puff Daddy) said the police had failed to act, ignoring his multiple pleas for help — at first to disperse the crowd outside, and later when it was clear people had been injured. Although Police Commissioner Lee Brown initially claimed officers were outside the gymnasium and unaware of what was happening inside, he later acknowledged police had been present in the lobby at the time of the stampede.

=== Investigation ===
Ordered by Mayor David Dinkins, the investigation into the City College Stampede took 17 days, and consisted of at least 107 interviews, as well as review of multiple tapes and videotapes of the stampede. Deputy Mayor Milton Mollen's report, either 66 or 67 pages, was titled "A Failure of Responsibility." It concluded that "almost all of the individuals involved in the event" acted improperly, and highlighted the following key factors:

- Police did not intervene quickly enough, even after it was clear there was a disturbance taking place outside of the event.
- City College officials took a generally hands-off approach in allowing their student groups to plan events, and did not make enough of an effort to investigate despite warning signs about the event's scope and potential security concerns.
- Promoter Sean Combs delegated planning to assistants with insufficient experience and failed to purchase the necessary insurance.
- Evening Student Government, led by Cassandra Kirnon, dismissed questions from administrators and failed to follow college policies.
- People in the crowd ignored directives and made a rush for the entrance despite being turned away.

It also noted the issues with EMS response time to the scene, but added that the medical examiner did not think a faster response would have saved any of the victims' lives. The investigation was unable to determine who had closed the door at the bottom of the stairs, a crucial factor of the incident.

The report cast a broad net of blame, but also clarified unsubstantiated or false early reports. They stated that Combs had not hired members of the Nation of Islam to provide security, as the college's chief of security had initially reported. They also said that Combs had not necessarily sold too many tickets, but more so had failed to account for the number of people that would arrive without them. It was also pointed out that although the incident was popularly referred to as a stampede, the injuries were more consistent with crowd crush than a trampling. None of the victims had any broken bones.

Commissioner Lee Brown disputed the report's findings, saying there was no evidence any officers had acted improperly.

=== Lawsuits ===
On January 3, the first lawsuit was filed on the behalf of Dawn McCain's family, seeking $500 million from police, EMS, the security agency, performers, and promoters. The family attorney also gave notice they would sue City College.

Although no criminal charges were ultimately sought against anyone for the City College stampede, multiple wrongful death and personal injury lawsuits were filed.

In 1997, Sean Combs paid $50,000 to Sonny Williams, whose sister Sonya Williams died after attending the basketball game. Two years later, a lawsuit found Combs, Dwight Myers (Heavy D), and City College negligent and equally liable for monetary damages.

=== Impact and legacy ===
In 2004, Vice Chancellor of CUNY Allan Dobrin testified at a City Council hearing about how the institution had changed their security policies in response to the tragedy.

A documentary about the stampede titled City College 9 was released in 2006. It was directed and produced by Jason Swain, the younger brother of victim Dirk Swain.

Investigation Discovery's documentary series The Fall of Diddy, which primarily detailed the Sean Combs sexual misconduct allegations, also highlighted his involvement in promoting the event where the stampede ultimately took place.

== See also ==
- Crowd collapses and crushes § Crowd "stampedes"
- List of disasters in New York City by death toll
- Astroworld Festival crowd crush
