= Spencer Kellogg & Sons, Inc. =

Former US plant oil and Shipping Company

- Industry: Plant oils, Shipping
- Founded: 1912 in Buffalo, New York, United States
- Fate: Sold to Textron in 1961
- Key people: Spencer Kellogg; Howard Kellogg; Morris Kellogg; Donald Kellogg.
- Products: Linseed oil, Soybean oil and Castor oil

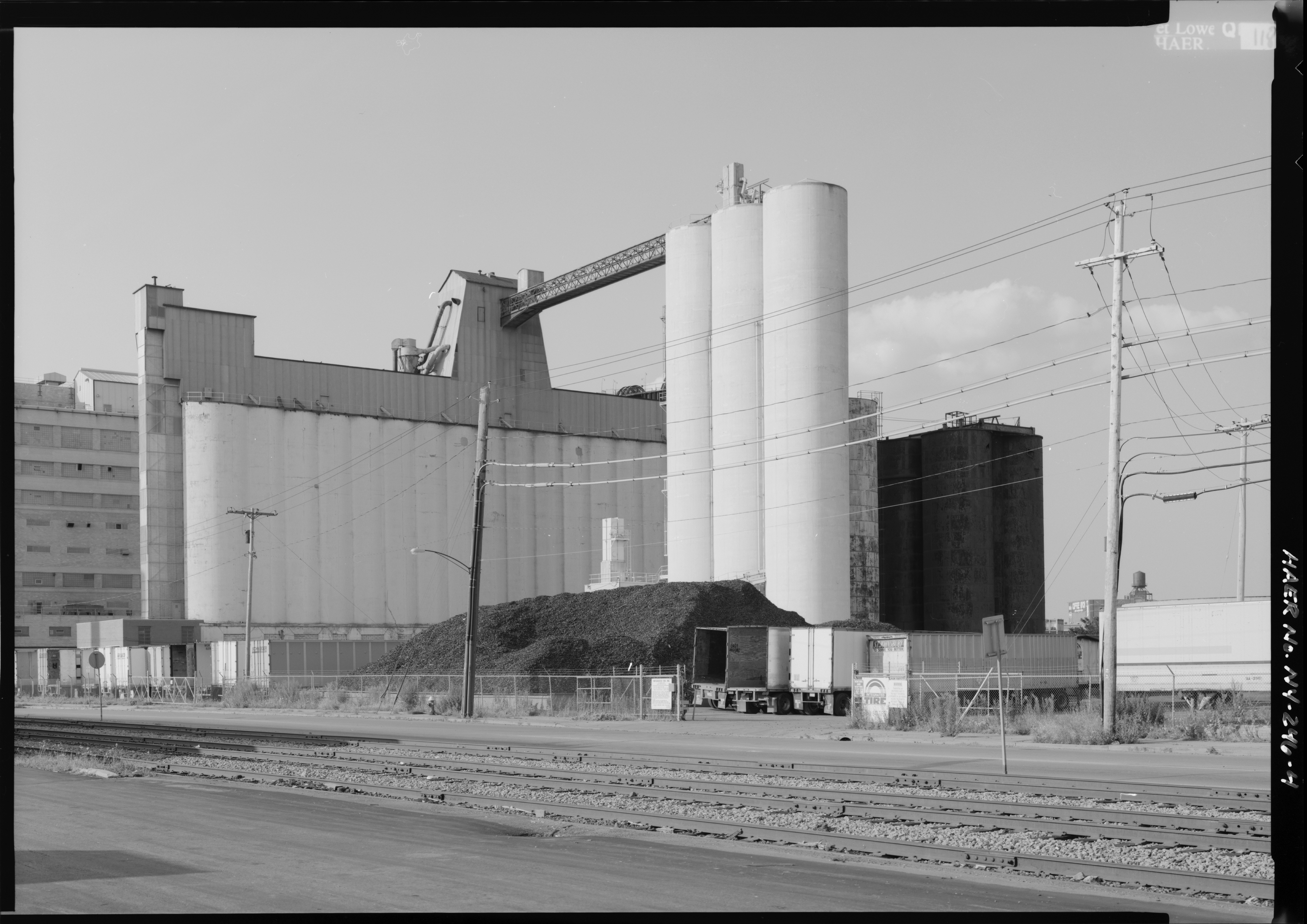
Spencer Kellogg & Sons, Inc. grain elevator storage at 389 Ganson Street, Buffalo, built in 1910, 154 feet tall

The Spencer Kellogg & Sons, Inc. company was incorporated in 1912 with its headquarters in Buffalo, New York. The company operated four flaxseed crushing plants, four soybean crushing plants, one copra crushing plant in Manila, one castor bean crushing plant and one tung oil rectifying and refining plant in Hankou, China. It became the largest manufacturer of Soybean oil, castor oil, linseed oil and other oils.

== History ==
The company was founded by Spencer Kellogg in 1912 in Buffalo, New York. Spencer Kellogg & Sons, Inc. operated a linseed oil mill. Oil was extracted from flax seeds. Later, castor oil and other oils were added to the product line. Spencer Kellogg & Sons, Inc. Spencer Kellogg & Sons furthermore had a coconut oil plant in Manila, and a tung oil plant in Hankou, China. The products were shipped by truck and rail. As they grew, products were shipped by steamships. They founded a subsidiary, Kellogg Steamship Corporation, which purchased their first ship in 1934, the SS Elizabeth Kellogg, a 5,189-ton tanker ship. Spencer Kellogg learned the linseed oil trade from his grandfather, Supplina Kellogg, who started his trade in 1824 in the Mohawk Valley, in Amsterdam, New York. Spencer Kellogg's sons worked at Spencer Kellogg & Sons, Inc.: Howard Kellogg, Morris Kellogg, and Donald Kellogg. Spencer Kellog and his wife, Jane Morris, also had four daughters, Elizabeth, Gertrude, Ruth, and Doris. Howard Kellogg became president of Spencer Kellogg & Sons, Inc. in 1922. Spencer Kellogg & Sons Buffalo Terminal, Buffalo was located south of the Prenatt Street rail tracks. The terminal had bulk storage of linseed oil in large tanks. Spencer Kellogg & Sons, Inc had an oilseed processing plant, pier & transit warehouse in Edgewater, New Jersey. In 1938 the company established its soybean headquarters in Decatur, Illinois. Spencer Kellogg & Sons, Inc. were active in supporting the World War II effort. In 1961 the company was sold to Textron.

== World War II ==
Spencer Kellogg & Sons fleet of ships that were used to help the World War II effort. During World War II Spencer Kellogg & Sons operated Merchant navy ships for the United States Shipping Board. During World War II Spencer Kellogg & Sons was active with charter shipping with the Maritime Commission and War Shipping Administration. Spencer Kellogg & Sons operated Liberty ships and Victory ships for the merchant navy. The ship was run by its Spencer Kellogg & Sons crew and the US Navy supplied United States Navy Armed Guards to man the deck guns and radio.

== Ships ==
- SS Elizabeth Kellogg, on Nov. 23, 1943 was hit on the port side by torpedo from U-516 north of Colón, Panama.
- SS Linseed King, port was pier at Edgewater, used to transport workers, ship sank Dec. 20, 1926 in the Hudson River, with lose of 51 to 58 lives.

Liberty ship of World War II

- Liberty ships operated for World War II:
  - Oscar S. Straus
  - Joseph Goldberger
  - Christopher L. Sholes
  - Richard J. Cleveland
  - Thomas F. Cunningham
  - Henry L. Ellsworth

== See also ==
- World War II United States Merchant Navy
