= Park Place disaster =

1891 gas explosion in New York City

Coordinates: 40°42′50.5″N 74°0′40″W

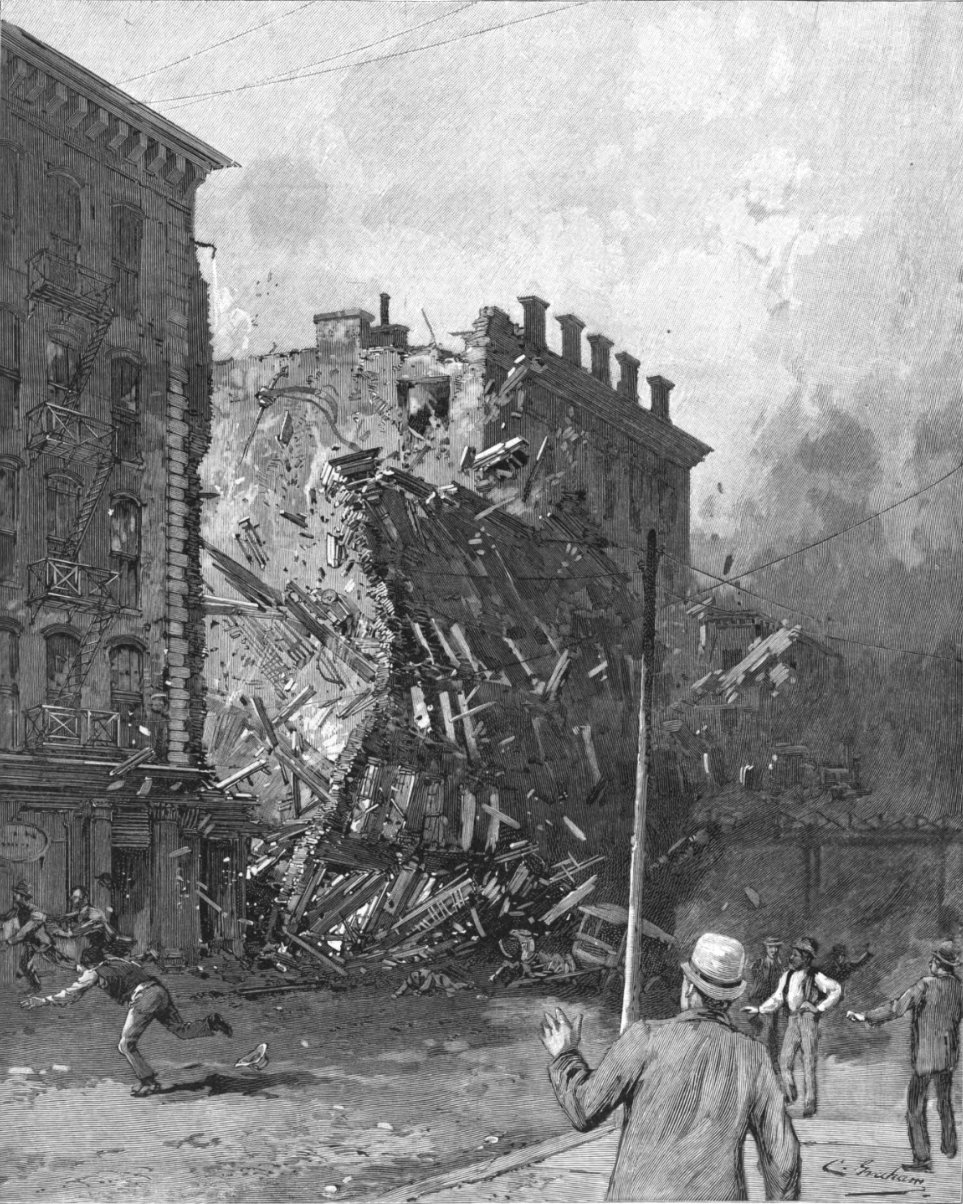
An artist's illustration of the collapse

The Park Place disaster occurred on August 22, 1891, in New York City when benzene vapor from a bronze powder manufacturer ignited, causing an explosion that resulted in the collapse of the five-story Taylor Building that housed the manufacturer along with other businesses. Two fires then broke out, one in the ruins of the manufacturer and the other in a restaurant that was caused by a natural gas leak. The disaster killed 61 people, while local residents were admonished in the press for rubbernecking and general insensitivity. A grand jury declined to indict any of the owners or occupants of the building, however legislation was introduced in the New York State Assembly that sought to tighten the building code in light of this disaster and the 1892 Hotel Royal fire.
