= 1967 New York City freight train collision =

Train accident

Coordinates: 40°49′42″N 73°57′6″W

On May 22, 1967, two New York Central Railroad freight trains collided head-on on the West 30th Street Branch line in Manhattan, New York City. That morning track two of the line was closed for repair, and so trains were single-tracking on track one. A 15-car, three-engine train traveling south from Syracuse, New York, collided with a northbound 60-car, four-engine train on a curve just south of 147th street, killing six crew members—three from each train Both trains were traveling around 40 miles per hour (64 km/h). This was the first accident investigated by the newly-formed U.S. National Transportation Safety Board, which blamed the New York City 72nd Street tower operator for failing to restrict the movement of the northbound train, along with other contributing dispatcher and operator errors.
