= Brooklyn Bridge stampede =

Stampede on May 30, 1883

Coordinates: 40.7092°N 74.0008°W

Depiction of the Brooklyn Bridge stampede by Frank Leslie for his illustrated newspaper

The Brooklyn Bridge stampede occurred on May 30, 1883, the week after the Brooklyn Bridge opened. Twelve people died and 36 were seriously injured.

== Background ==
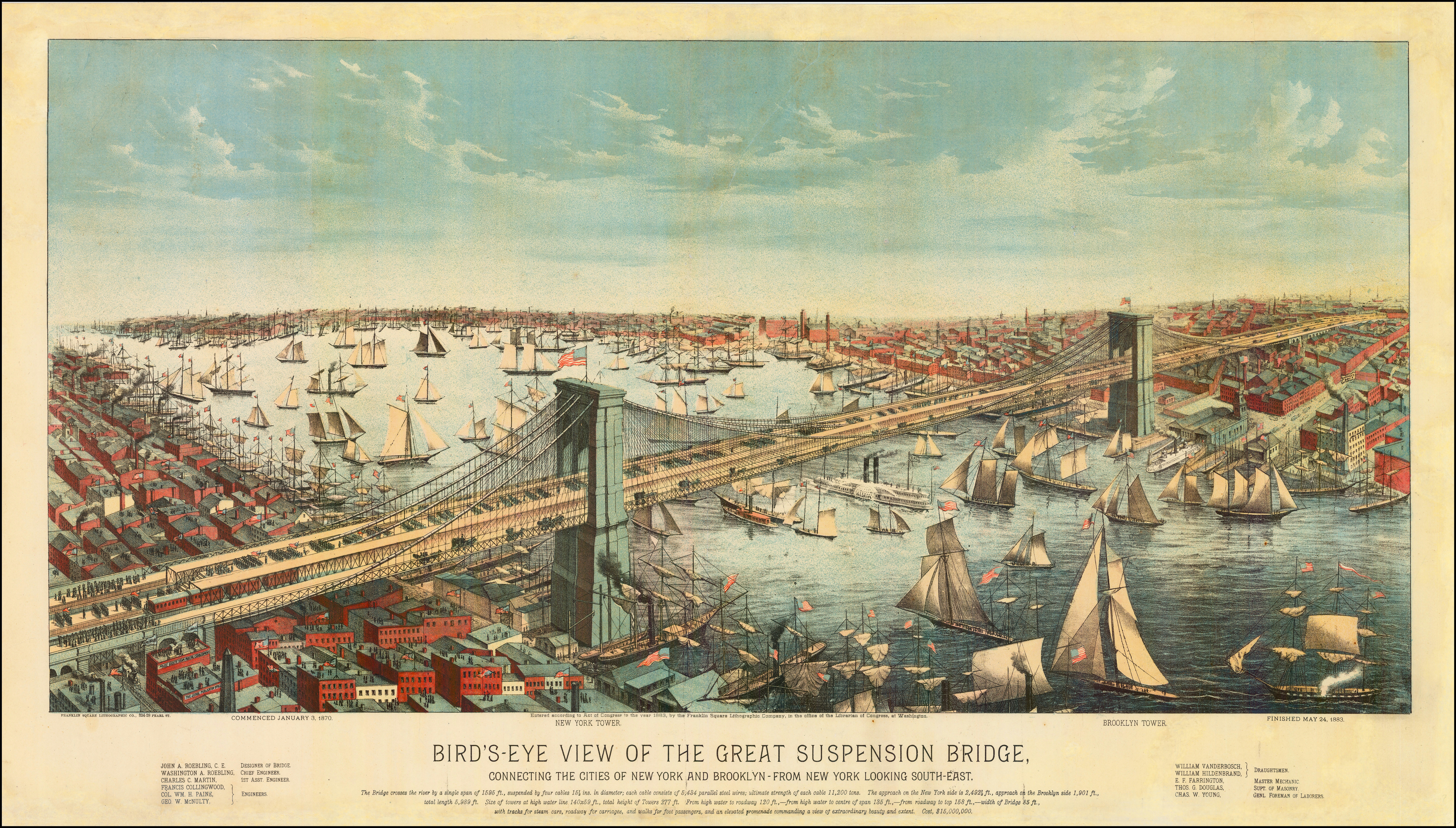
The Brooklyn Bridge in 1883

Due to predispositions towards suspension bridges, skepticism about the Brooklyn Bridge's safety was prevalent among the New York populous. Regardless, the day after the opening of the Brooklyn Bridge on May 24, 1883, over one hundred thousand civilians traversed the bridge. The closing of businesses and excitement about the recent opening of the bridge generated a larger crowd to the bridge.

== Incident ==
The stampede occurred on Memorial Day (which at the time was always observed on May 30), and a large crowd flocked to the bridge due to businesses being closed, causing a pedestrian bottleneck. When a woman fell down the stairs, another woman screamed (supposedly claiming that the bridge was collapsing) which induced a panic onto the crowd. The subsequent rushing to an entrance bottlenecked an entrance leading to trampling. According to the New York Times, "In a moment the whole stairway was packed with dead and dying men, women and children piled upon another in a writhing, struggling mass." Workers and soldiers nearby aided the crowd, ripping off parts of the iron fence to widen allow for the crowd to exit.

== Aftermath ==
Shortly after, rumors and sensational newspaper capitalized off of the tragedy. Much of the blame was directed to the bridge's management, leading to uniformed officers to move the people along the bridge in future. In order to secure public trust, on May 17, 1884, P. T. Barnum was permitted to parade a group of camels and elephants, including Jumbo, across the bridge.
