= Hotel Royal fire =

1892 hotel fire in New York City

Coordinates: 40°45′12.2″N 73°59′5.5″W

The Hotel Royal fire occurred on February 7, 1892, at the Hotel Royal in New York City, killing 28 people. The fire began in the hotel's elevator shaft, where the night engineer was performing maintenance work by the light of a candle. The candle's flame either ignited a gas leak in the shaft, or it caught a dry tinder such as dust and was then flamed by the strong winds blowing through the shaft. A coroner's jury assigned no fault for the fire and made no recommendations for safety improvements; however, legislation was introduced in the New York State Assembly that sought to tighten the building code in light of the fire as well as the 1891 Park Place disaster.
