= Ninth Ward School disaster =

1851 mass crush in New York City

Coordinates: 40°44′7.5″N 74°0′0″W

The Ninth Ward School disaster occurred on November 20, 1851, at Ward School No. 26 at 38 Greenwich Avenue where Charles Street ends in New York City. While classes were in session, panic suddenly arose among the teachers and students about a possible fire in the building. A mass of students proceeded to flee down a staircase, causing the bannister to fail and the students to tumble into a large pile—reportedly 10 to 12 feet (3.0 to 3.7 m) deep—at the bottom of the staircase. Forty-three students died, mostly due to suffocation. An investigation determined that the students' escape had been slowed by inward-swinging exit doors and that the construction of the staircase bannister was insufficient to support the weight of the students. While a coroner's jury found no fault in the accident, it recommended that all schools be built with fire-protected stairways and outward-opening exit doors.
