= Hague Street explosion =

Industrial disaster in New York City

Coordinates: 40.707°N 74.007°W

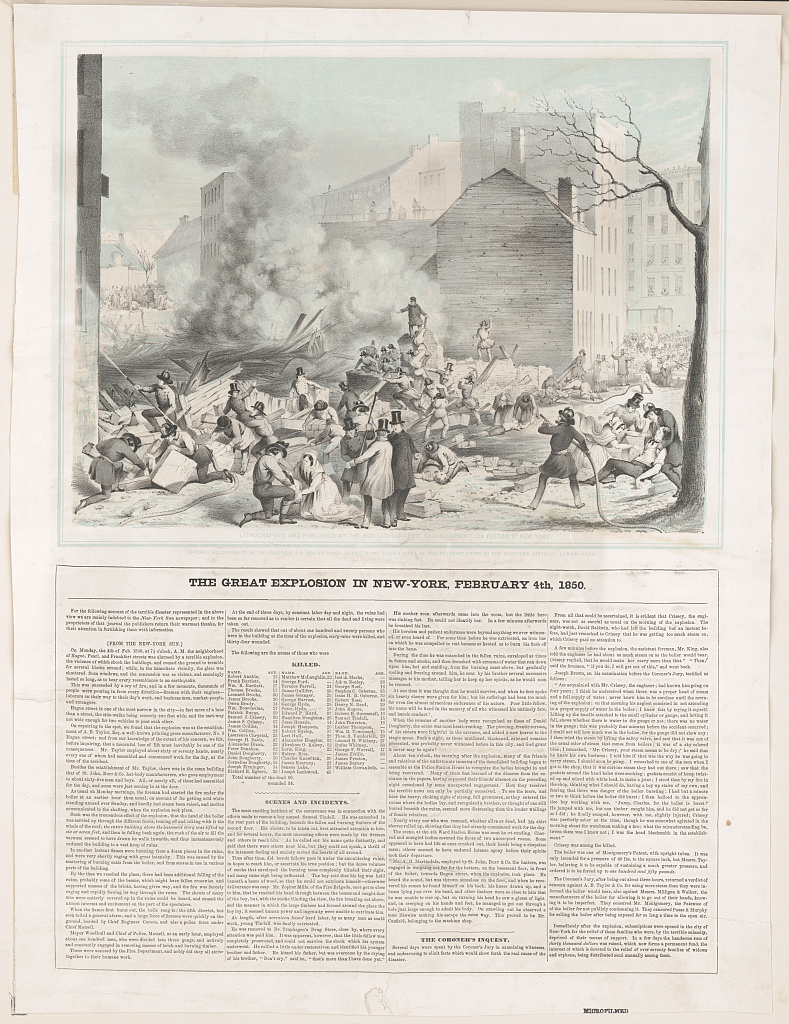
A lithograph of the event issued several months afterward

The Hague Street explosion occurred on February 4, 1850, in New York City, when a boiler exploded at a printing press manufacturer. The blast killed at least 67 people, injured around 30, and sent thousands running into the streets. According to news reports at the time, the head of the boiler was carried up through all six of the building's stories and finally tore off the building's roof, while the building itself lifted six to seven feet (1.8 to 2.1 m) in the air, causing it to collapse in on itself. One report stated,

The windows and doors across Hague Street, and in the rear of houses [on] Pearl Street, were burst in as if with cannon shot, and everything around indicates that the explosion was one of the most violent that could occur. So powerful was the explosion that the shock, like the trembling of an earthquake, was felt in some of the stores [on] Broadway, a distance, in a direct line, of about a quarter of a mile, and was probably felt at a greater distance.

The rescue effort was led by New York City Mayor Caleb Smith Woodhull and the New York City Police Department, with assistance from the fire department. About 100 rescuers were divided into three teams, working in shifts. The last person to be rescued was a young boy who had been trapped for 17 hours under a mass of wood and iron beams. The boy died of burn injuries shortly after his rescue; his story featured prominently in newspaper reports of the day.
