= Observation (steamboat) =

The Observation was a steamship that exploded on September 9, 1932, in the East River of New York City. Workers were being transported to the construction site of the Rikers Island penitentiary complex when the explosion happened. 72 men died.

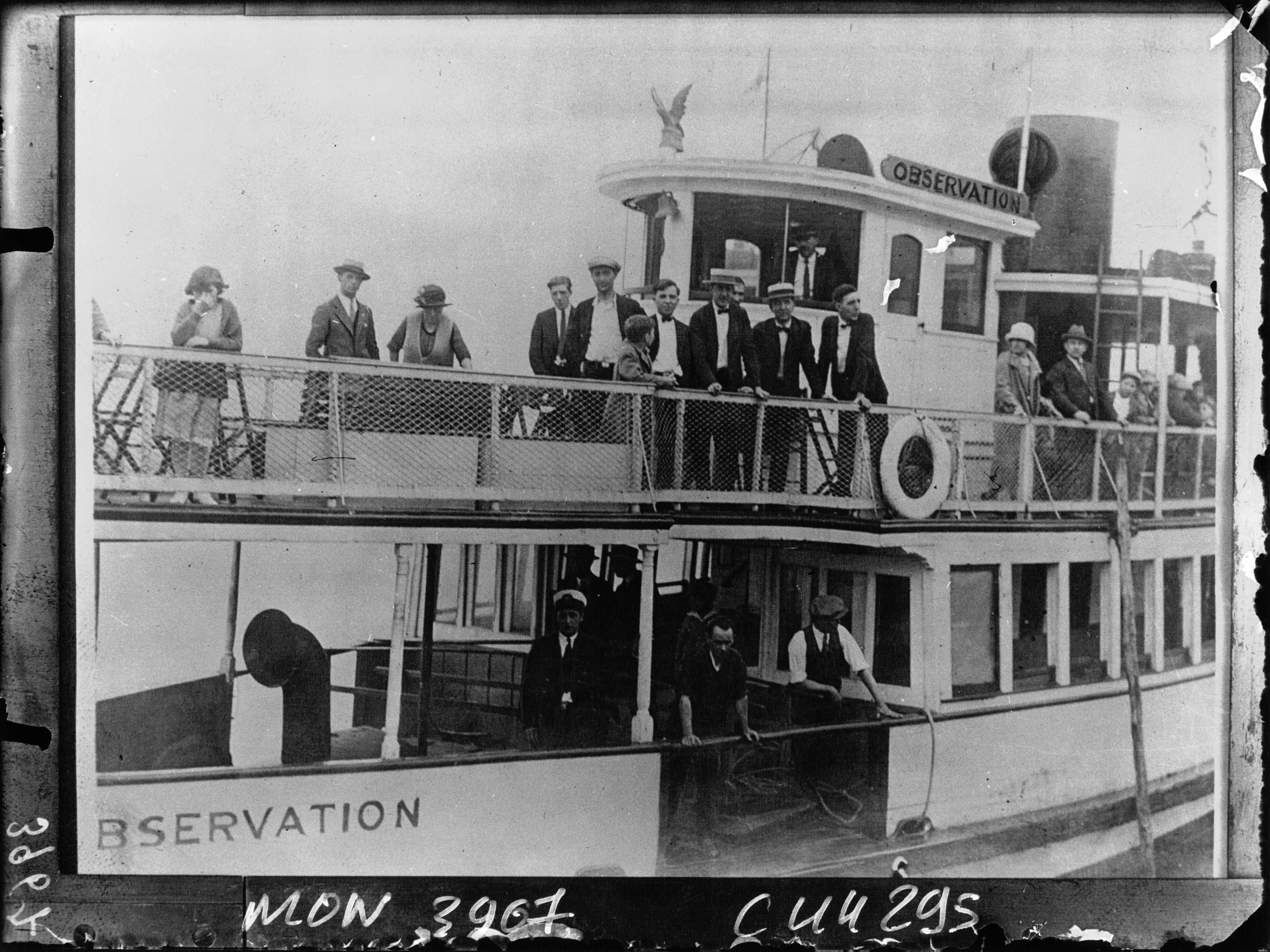

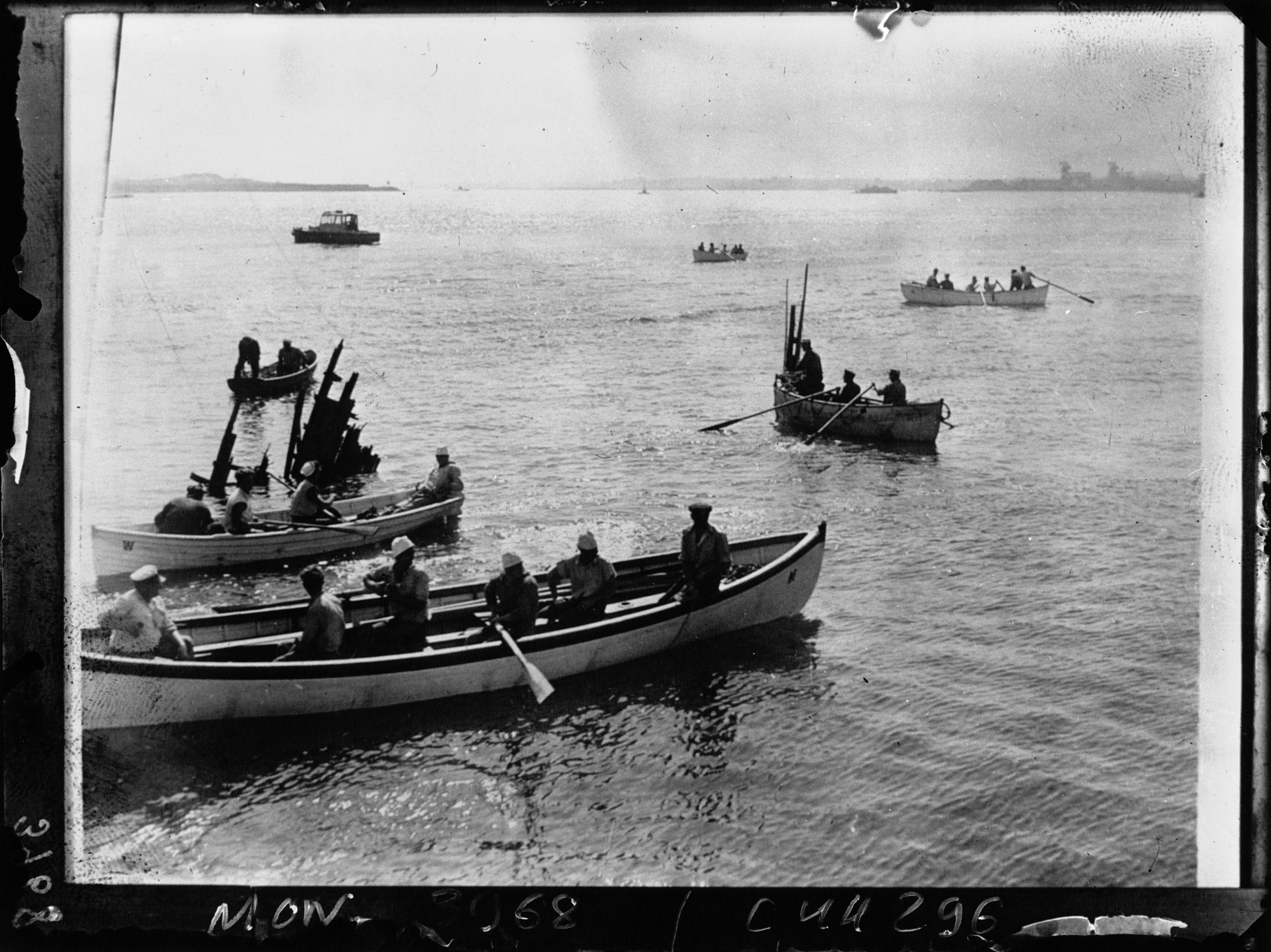

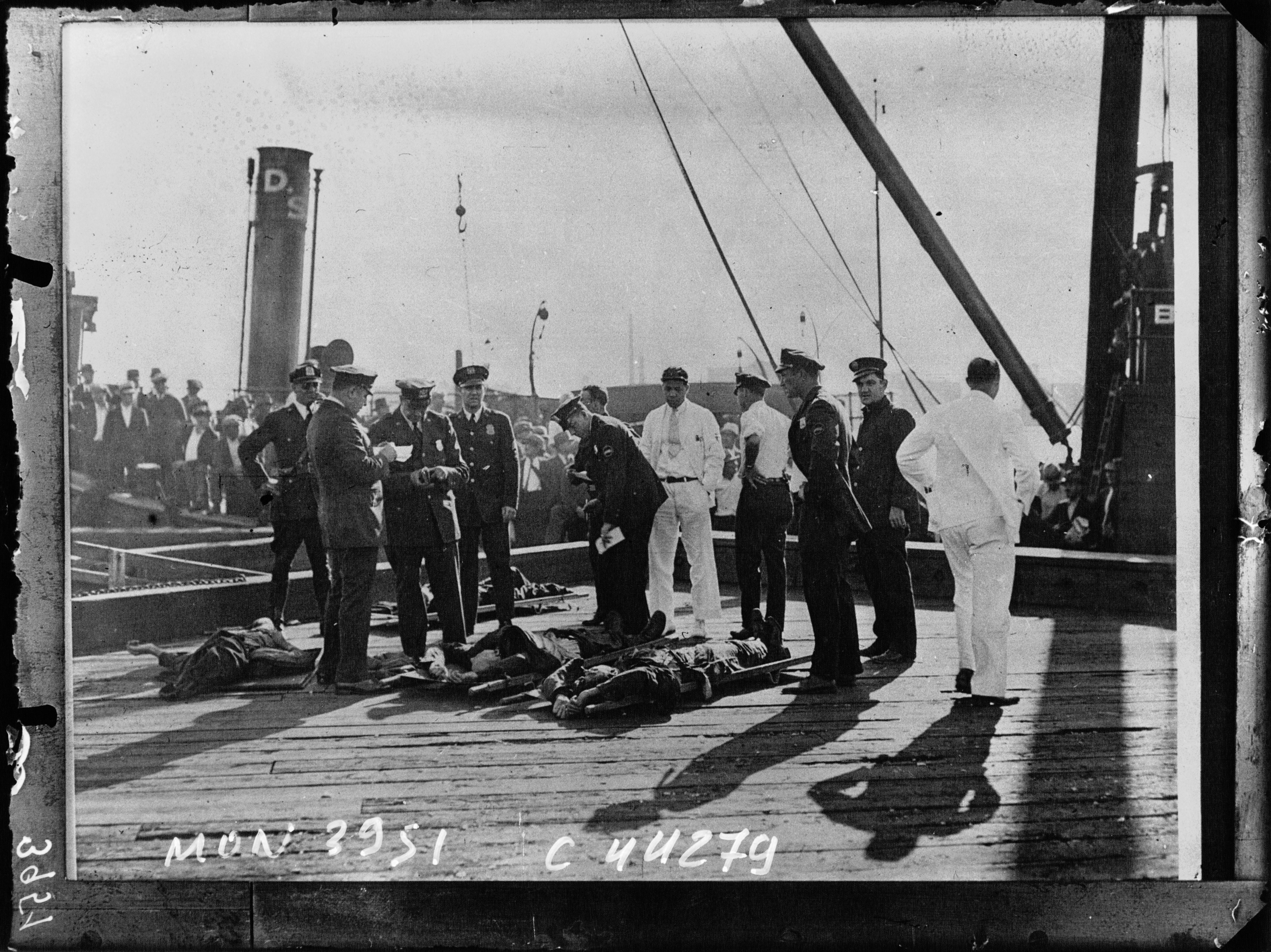
