= Seawanhaka disaster =

Coordinates: 40.786°N 73.938°W

History
- Name: Seawanhaka
- Port of registry: United States
- Builder: Terry
- Laid down: 1866
- Fate: Exploded and sunk June 28, 1880

General characteristics
- Class & type: Paddle steamer
- Tonnage: 611.74 grt
- Length: 225 ft (69 m)
- Beam: 40 ft (12 m)
- Draft: 6 ft (1.8 m)
- Decks: 2

On June 28, 1880, a boiler aboard the steamboat Seawanhaka exploded while the boat was in the East River near Wards Island, New York City, setting the boat on fire and resulting in the deaths of 24 to 35 people. A coroner's jury found that although the boiler had passed inspection the prior March and should have been in good working condition, the loss of life was exacerbated by the poor discipline of the boat crew following the explosion.
