= Linseed King =

Boat that sank in 1926

History
- Name: Linseed King
- Owner: Spencer Kellogg & Sons, Inc.
- Port of registry: United States
- Laid down: 1919
- Fate: Sank December 20, 1926

General characteristics
- Class & type: Launch
- Tonnage: 10.75 grt
- Length: 45 ft (14 m)
- Beam: 10 ft (3.0 m)
- Depth: 4.5 ft (1.4 m)
- Installed power: Gasoline engine

The Linseed King was a gasoline-powered launch owned by Spencer Kellogg & Sons, Inc., that sank in the Hudson River near New York City on December 20, 1926, resulting in the deaths of between 51 and 58 people. The boat departed Manhattan's 95th Street pier at 6:30 in the morning in darkness, carrying between 75 and 86 people, mainly workers destined for Spencer Kellogg & Sons' plant in Edgewater, New Jersey. Just past midstream, the boat struck a heavy object, likely an ice floe, opening a 19-inch (48 cm) tear in her port bow. She sank in about two minutes. Twenty-nine people survived by clinging to the launch or by swimming to ice floes, while the remainder, unable to escape the boat's cabin, drowned in the icy water. It was the deadliest maritime accident in New York City history since the sinking of the PS General Slocum in 1904.
