= Eastern Air Lines Flight 512 =

1962 aviation accident

Coordinates: 40.641°N 73.807°W

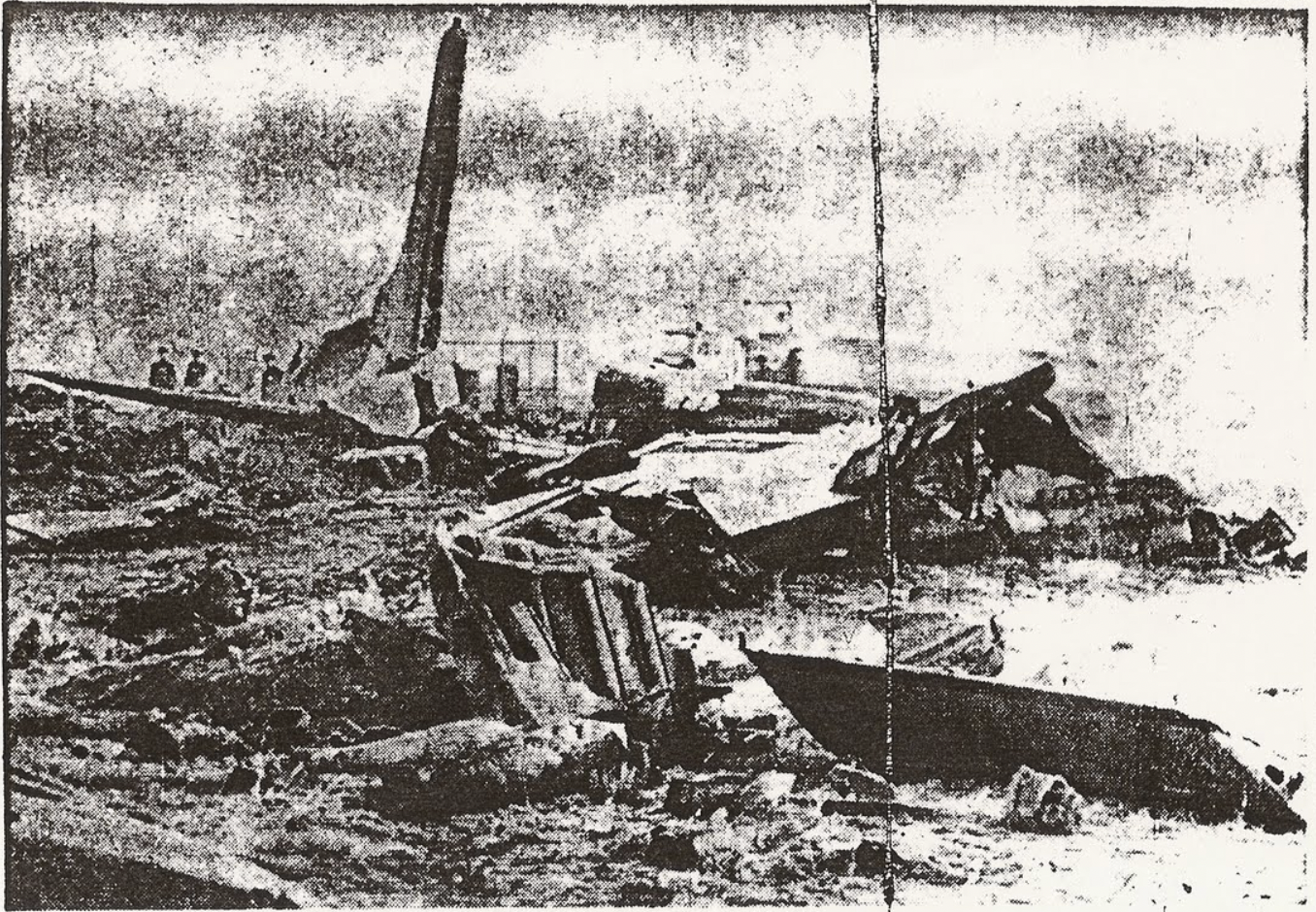
- The wreckage of the aircraft

Accident
- Date: November 30, 1962
- Summary: Pilot error
- Site: Idlewild Airport New York City, US

Aircraft
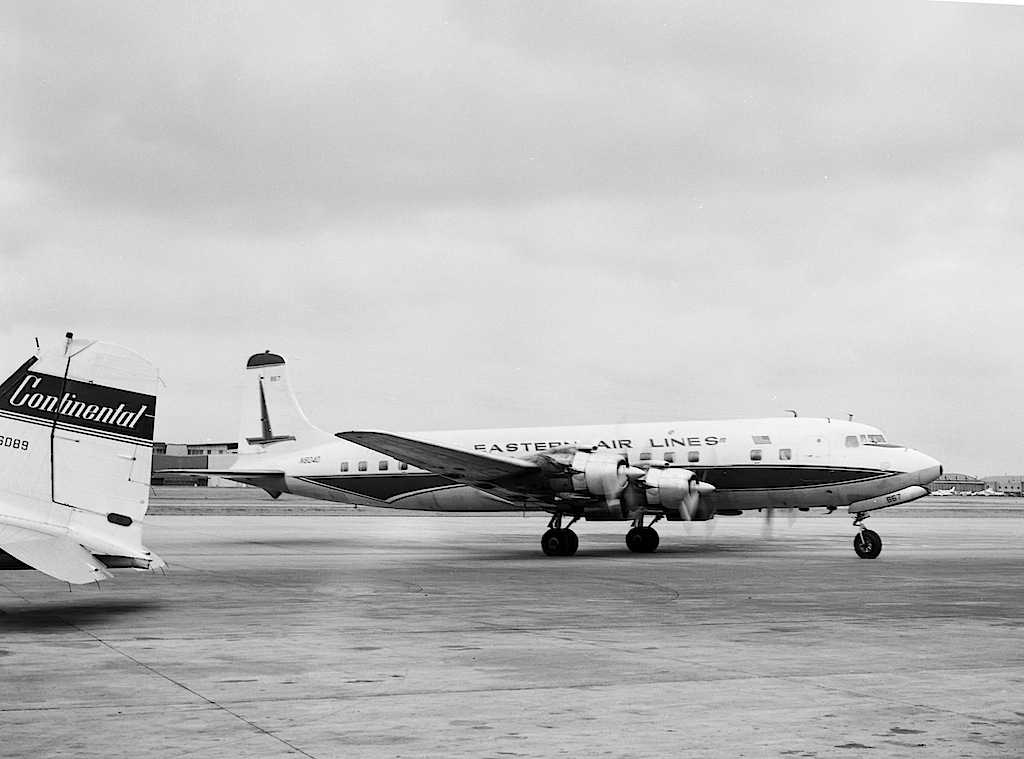
- An Eastern Air Lines DC-7, similar to the one involved in the crash
- Aircraft type: Douglas DC-7B
- Operator: Eastern Air Lines
- Registration: N815D
- Flight origin: Charlotte Municipal Airport; Charlotte, North Carolina, US
- Destination: Idlewild Airport; New York City, US
- Occupants: 51
- Passengers: 45
- Crew: 6
- Fatalities: 25
- Survivors: 26

Eastern Air Lines Flight 512 was a scheduled American domestic passenger flight operated by Eastern Air Lines from Charlotte Municipal Airport in Charlotte, North Carolina, to Idlewild Airport in New York City. On November 30, 1962, while attempting to abort an attempted landing at its destination, the Douglas DC-7B operating the flight crashed after it failed to gain altitude and struck the ground. 25 of the 51 occupants of the plane died in the accident. Emergency crews responded, but rescuers were delayed by the thick fog and the soft terrain. An investigation launched after the crash found that the probable cause of the accident was that the pilots had made critical mistakes during the go-around that prevented the aircraft from gaining altitude.

== Accident ==
The flight left Charlotte Municipal Airport at 7:41 p.m. Eastern Standard time en route to Idlewild Airport in New York City. Federal Aviation Agency (FAA) notifications had made the crew aware that the precision approach radar system at the airport was out of service. The weather forecast called for clear skies or scattered clouds. While the flight was en route, patches of ground fog started developing at Idlewild. At 8:57 p.m., the pilots were advised that there would be a delay of an undetermined length due to the fog. The flight entered a holding pattern until 9:33 p.m. when it was instructed to enter the approach path to runway 4R. Other aircraft landing ahead of the flight reported dense fog at ground level with extremely low visibility; pilots of one flight that had been cleared to take off requested a delay because the fog was too dense for safe operation. Runway visual range instruments in the United States Weather Bureau office at the airport recorded visibility that had dropped to virtually zero shortly before the instruments failed completely, but this information was not communicated to the tower personnel. As a result, the pilots of inbound aircraft were not made aware of the reduced visibility. Instead, the tower reported visibility of one mile (one point six kilometers), although flight crews would have likely heard radio traffic from other pilots describing the poor conditions. Rules that were in effect at the airport required a visibility of at least 2,000 feet (610 m) for a runway to remain open.

As Flight 512 approached the runway, the pilots descended to as low as 25 feet (8 m) above the ground, about 1,000 feet (300 m) beyond the touchdown point on the runway. At that point, the crew decided to abandon the approach. They retracted the landing gear, changed the flaps setting from 40 degrees to 20 degrees, and angled the aircraft to begin climbing, with a climb angle of between three and five degrees above the level position. However, the pilots did not increase the engine power. Because they had retracted the flaps without increasing the power that the engines were providing, the aircraft lost lift, one of the wings struck the ground, and the aircraft tumbled across a marsh.

The fuselage separated from the wings on a mound of earth approximately 3 feet (1 m) high, located 3,600 feet (1,100 m) down the runway. The fuel tanks in the left wing ruptured, igniting a fire on the ground. The fuselage broke apart approximately at the separator between the tourist and first class sections and came to rest in soft sand approximately 200 yards (180 m) from the runway. At 9:45 p.m., tower personnel saw a bright orange flash and initiated emergency procedures. They requested that the crew of American Airlines Flight 8, which was on approach immediately after Flight 512, overfly the runway to see if they could see what had happened. After the flyover, the crew reported back that they could see a fire to the left of the runway.

== Aftermath ==
After the crash, emergency vehicles were dispatched to the accident site, but they were delayed by the thick fog and the soft marshy terrain where the aircraft ended up. One ambulance driver reported that visibility was as low as five feet (two meters), which made it difficult to locate the crash victims. The arrival of some of the emergency vehicles from areas outside the airport was delayed by slow-moving traffic on nearby roads. Police prevented all but emergency traffic from entering the area, but curious onlookers still caused traffic congestion on the streets around the airport. Many were seen walking around the perimeter, having left their vehicles on surrounding roads. The airport was closed to air traffic until 7:10 a.m. the following morning.

Survivors said that the plane burst into flames immediately after the crash. While the rear section of the fuselage remained relatively intact, other sections of the fuselage, engine parts, and broken pieces of propellers, were scattered around the crash site.

Many of the survivors were thrown clear of the aircraft when it hit the ground, still strapped to their seats. Others climbed out of the broken fuselage and were assisted by the two flight attendants to safety. Victims were taken to the airport's medical center, Peninsula General Hospital, or Queens General Hospital. Two of the survivors had critical injuries, while others were less seriously injured.

== Aircraft ==
The aircraft was a Douglas DC-7B four-engined passenger aircraft. It was manufactured in September 1956 and had manufacturer's serial number 45084. It was registered by Eastern Air Lines with tail number N815D and had a total flying time of 18,411 hours at the time of the crash. It was powered by four Wright model 972TC18DA piston propeller engines.

== Passengers and crew ==
The captain of the flight was Edward Bechtold, aged 43. He had been employed at Eastern Air Lines since April 1945 and had logged a total of 15,644 hours of flight time, including 2,700 on the DC-7 type aircraft. In 1943, he received the Air Medal for meritorious achievement from Lieutenant General George C. Kenney, commander of Allied air forces in the Southwest Pacific. He was the chairman of the New York Air Safety Committee. The copilot was Julius Wagner, aged 45. He had been employed at the airline since March 1951 and had accumulated a total of 9,042 hours of flight time, including 1,610 hours in the DC-7. The flight engineer was Robert Voorhees, age 31. He had accumulated a total of 4,080 hours of flight time, which included 149 hours as a flight engineer and 718 hours as a pilot in DC-7 aircraft. He had been employed at the airline since August 1957. All three pilots were killed in the crash. An additional crew member who was not working this flight occupied the jump seat in the cockpit and was also killed.

The two flight attendants survived the crash and assisted with the evacuation of survivors of the crash. They were credited with saving the lives of people who might have otherwise died in the fire that consumed the aircraft after the crash.

The plane carried 45 passengers at the time of the crash. All of the passengers were from the United States except one, who was from Canada. Twenty one of the passengers were killed, and some of the survivors were injured. All of the survivors were seated in the rear half of the plane, which remained intact long enough for them to escape.

== Investigation ==
A team of 80 flight experts, including a team of 24 from the Civil Aeronautics Board (CAB), began an investigation, supervised by G. Joseph Minetti and assisted by George A. Van Epps, supervisory air safety investigator for the New York Region. The overall investigation was directed by Arthur E. Newsmann, the person in charge of the Denver office.

On October 10, 1963, the CAB released its final accident report. In it, they found that the probable cause of the accident was the technique employed by the crew during their abandonment of the aircraft's approach in the unexpected fog conditions. The board concluded that if the crew had either rotated the aircraft to a higher nose-up position, or had used more engine power, the plane's descent would have been arrested and the accident avoided.
