= Trans International Airlines Flight 863 =

1970 aviation accident

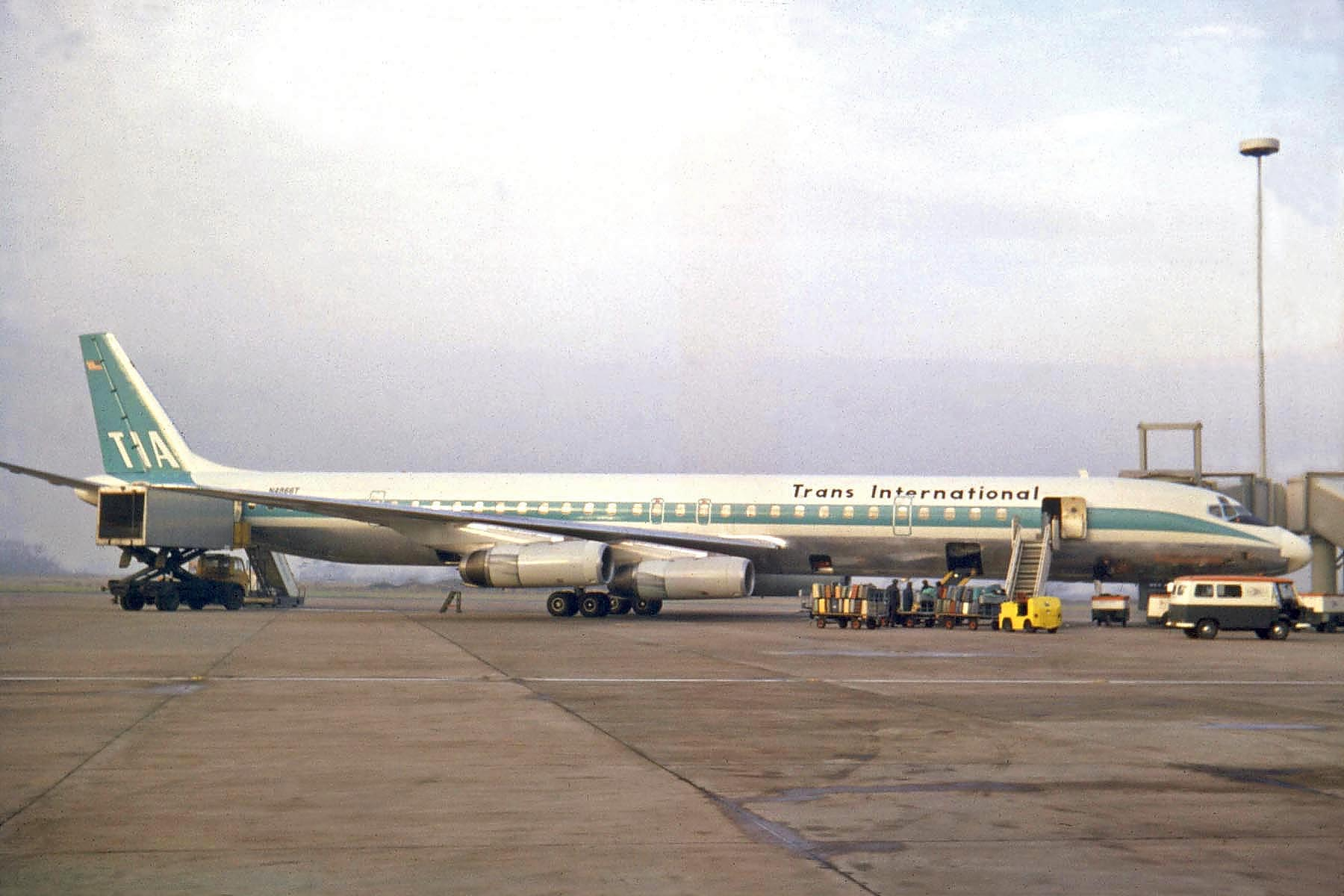
- A Trans International Airlines DC-8 similar to the aircraft involved in the accident

Accident
- Date: September 8, 1970
- Summary: Right elevator jammed by foreign object; further aggravated by pilot error, resulting in loss of pitch control
- Site: John F. Kennedy International Airport, New York City, New York, United States; 40°39′N 73°47′W

Aircraft
- Aircraft type: Douglas DC-8-63CF
- Operator: Trans International Airlines
- IATA flight No.: TV863
- ICAO flight No.: TV863
- Call sign: TRANS-INTERNATIONAL 863
- Registration: N4863T
- Flight origin: John F. Kennedy International Airport, New York City
- Destination: Washington Dulles International Airport, Virginia
- Occupants: 11
- Passengers: 0
- Crew: 11
- Fatalities: 11
- Survivors: 0

Trans International Airlines Flight 863 was a ferry flight from John F. Kennedy International Airport in New York City to Washington Dulles International Airport. On September 8, 1970, the Douglas DC-8 (registration N4863T) crashed during take-off from JFK's runway 13R. None of the 11 occupants, who were all crew members, survived.

The probable cause of the accident was an asphalt-covered object lodged in between the right elevator and the right horizontal stabilizer, that jammed the elevator and caused the loss of pitch control.

== Aircraft and crew ==
The aircraft involved was a Douglas DC-8-63CF, built in 1968. The aircraft was powered by four Pratt and Whitney JT3D-7 engines. The aircraft had 7,878 hours at the time of the accident.

The captain was 49-year-old Joseph John May, who had 22,300 flight hours, including 7,100 hours on the DC-8. Other TIA pilots referred to him as "Ron". The first officer was 47-year-old John Donald Loeffler, who had 15,775 flight hours, with 4,750 of them on the DC-8. The flight engineer was 42-year-old Donald Kenneth Neely, who had 10,000 flight hours, including 3,500 hours on the DC-8. Eight flight attendants also were on board.

== Accident ==
At 16:04 (EST), the aircraft was cleared to take off from JFK Airport runway 13R. The take-off roll commenced one minute later. The rotation occurred extremely early, at very slow speed only 1,550 feet (470 m) down the runway. Due to the slow rotation, a tailstrike occurred and the tail skidded on the runway for 1,250 feet (380 m). The cockpit voice recorder (CVR) recorded the sound of the tailstrike.

At 16:05:35, Captain May said, "let's take it off," with First Officer Loeffler replying, "can't control this thing, Ron." The aircraft became airborne at 2,800 feet (850 m) down the runway. About 2 seconds after takeoff, the stick-shaker activated, warning the flight crew that the aircraft was in danger of stalling. The aircraft pitched 60–90° nose-up, rising only 300–500 feet (91–152 m) above the ground. The aircraft then rolled 20° to the right, then sharply to the left, and stalled in a nose-down position. The aircraft crashed into the ground at 16:05:52. The aircraft exploded and burst into flames on impact, killing the crew.

== Investigation ==
The National Transportation Safety Board (NTSB) investigated the crash. The accident was labeled as "nonsurvivable." While examining the wreckage, investigators discovered a foreign object lodged in between the right elevator and the right horizontal stabilizer. The NTSB determined that this jammed the elevator and caused the loss of pitch control, but could not determine how the object got lodged in between the two surfaces, though one scenario stated that the object was blown in by wake turbulence from the aircraft that took off before Flight 863.

The NTSB published its final report on August 18, 1971, with the "probable cause" section stating:

The Board determines that the probable cause of this accident was a loss of pitch control caused by the entrapment of a pointed, asphalt-covered object between the leading edge of the right elevator and the right horizontal spar web access door in the aft part of the stabilizer. The restriction to elevator movement, caused by a highly unusual and unknown condition, was not detected by the crew in time to reject the take off successfully; however, an apparent lack of crew responsiveness to a highly unusual emergency situation, coupled with the captain's failure to monitor adequately the take off, contributed to the failure to reject the take off.

== Aftermath ==
After the accident, the Federal Aviation Administration instituted new time minima between aircraft in line-up for take off.

== See also ==
- Emery Worldwide Airlines Flight 17 – another accident involving a DC-8 freighter also involving problems with the right elevator
