= List of human stampedes in Hindu temples =

The List of human stampedes in Hindu temples/holy places in India includes:

Human stampedes in Hindu temples in India
Deaths	Date	Name	Location	Description
10+	5 May 2016	Unnamed	Madhya Pradesh	
430	March 1820	Kumbh Mela, Haridwar	Uttarakhand	
50	March 1986	Kumbh Mela, Haridwar	Uttarakhand	
50+	January 1840	Kumbh Mela, Allahabad	Uttar Pradesh	
50+	January 1906	Kumbh Mela, Allahabad	Uttar Pradesh	
50+	January 1986	Kumbh Mela, Allahabad	Uttar Pradesh	
29	14 July 2015	Rajahmundry Maha Pushkaralu stampede	Rajahmundry, Andhra Pradesh	On the first day of the Maha Pushkaralu festival, large crowds gathered at the Kotagummam Pushkar Ghat to bathe in the Godavari River. The stampede was caused by a large amount of pilgrims rushing towards the three gates and attempting to climb them.
10	25 August 2014	Chitrakoot Satna	Madhya Pradesh	
115	13 October 2013	Ratangarh Mata Temple, Datia	Madhya Pradesh	
36	10 February 2013	2013 Prayag Kumbh Mela stampede	Allahabad, Uttar Pradesh	A crowd crush occurred at a train station due to severe overcrowding.
3	21 October 2012	Bijasan Devi Salkanpur	Madhya Pradesh	
12	24 September 2012	Satsanga Deoghar disaster	Deoghar, Jharkhand	After an elderly woman fell in the overcrowded prayer hall of the Satsang Ashram, others fell and were trampled due to being pressured from the crowd behind them.
12	14 January 2012	Hussain Tekri, Ratlam	Madhya Pradesh	
102	15 January 2011	2011 Sabarimala crowd crush	Kerala	
63	4 March 2010	Kripalu Maharaj Ashram, Kunda	Uttar Pradesh	
146	3 August 2008	Naina Devi temple	Himachal Pradesh	A rumour of a landslide spread amongst the crowd and they trampled others in a panic to get away.
65	3 August 1978	Naina Devi temple	Himachal Pradesh	
224	30 September 2008	Chamunda Devi temple, Jodhpur	Rajasthan	
9	27 March 2008	Karila Devi Temple Ashok Nagar	Madhya Pradesh	
291	25 January 2005	Mandher Devi temple, Satara	Maharashtra	
5	17 November 2001	Sharda Devi Maihar	Madhya Pradesh	
52	14 January 1999	1999 Sabarimala stampede	Kerala	
60	15 July 1996	Haridwar and Ujjain stampedes	Madhya Pradesh (Haridwar) and Uttarakhand (Ujjain)	
48+	18 February 1992	Mahamaham tank, Kumbakonam	Tamil Nadu	
500–800+	3 February 1954	Kumbh Mela, Allahabad	Uttar Pradesh	
39	27 August 2003	Kumbh Mela, Nashik	Maharashtra	
6	3 July 2008	Jagannath Puri	Odisha	
7	14 January 2010	Makar Sankranti, Gangasagar mela	West Bengal	
7	14 April 2010	Unnamed	Haridwar, Uttarakhand	After Pilot Baba's car crashed into the crowd waiting to bathe in the river, panic spread and a crush ensued. Pilot Baba was charged with reckless driving.
116	2 July 2024	2024 Hathras crowd crush	Hathras district, Uttar Pradesh	At the end of a satsang with self-styled holy man Narayan Sakar Hari in Fulrai village, a crowd of devotees rushed forward to meet him and collect soil from around his feet.
7	12 August 2024	Baba Siddheshwar Nath Temple stampede	Jehanabad district, Bihar	An altercation caused the crowd of worshipers to surge into the temple. The temple was experiencing large crowds due to 12 August being a holy day.
6	8 January 2025	Tirupati stampede	Tirupati, Andhra Pradesh	A crowd of around 2,500 people gathered at the Venkateswara Temple to collect free ticket passes and surged forward after the gate was opened.
30	29 January 2025	2025 Prayag Maha Kumbh Mela crowd crush	Prayagraj, Uttar Pradesh	During the 2025 Prayag Maha Kumbh Mela, a crowd surged forward to bathe at the Triveni Sangam, and breached the barricades.
7	3 May 2025	Shree Lairai Devi Temple stampede	Shirgao, Goa	A crowd of 30,000−40,000 people gathered to participate in the Lairai Jatra festival. Some people standing on a slope fell, which caused others to fall over each other.
3	29 June 2025	Shree Gundicha Temple stampede	Puri, Odisha	A crowd rushed abruptly to see the god idols atop three chariots during the Ratha Yatra.
6	27 July 2025	Mansa Devi Temple stampede	Haridwar, Uttarakhand	An electric cable fell onto a narrow path, causing a large crowd to rush forward. The crush was worsened by the presence of a wall adjacent to the path.
2	28 July 2025	Avsaneshwar Temple stampede	Barabanki, Uttar Pradesh	A live electrical cord fell onto a tin shed, causing panic amongst the devotees inside.
9	1 November 2025		Srikakulam, Andhra Pradesh	
7	17 August 2026		Lakhisarai district, Uttar Pradesh	A falling electricity pole falling at Ashokdham Temple led to a rumour that a live wire had fell onto the crowd, leading to a crush on the women's queue.
19	17 October 2026		Kolkata, West Bengal	

== See also ==
- List of fatal crowd crushes
- Lists of Hindu temples
