= 2025 Prayag Maha Kumbh Mela crowd crush =

Crowd crush in January 2025 at the Kumbh Mela festival

- Part of 2025 Prayag Kumbh Mela
- Prayag Maha Kumbh Mela stampede (Uttar Pradesh) Prayag Maha Kumbh Mela stampede (India)
- Date: 29 January 2025
- Location: Prayagraj, Uttar Pradesh, India; 25.431388°N 81.887971°E
- Also known as: 2025 Prayag Maha Kumbh Mela Crowd collapses
- Type: Crowd collapses and Stampede
- Cause: Broken barrier
- Deaths: 37 (official); 37-82 (Sources disputed)
- Injuries: 60 (official); 90-200 (sources)

On 29 January 2025, crowd crushes occurred at the 2025 Prayag Kumbh Mela at the confluence of the Ganges, Yamuna, and Saraswati rivers in Prayagraj, in the northern Indian state of Uttar Pradesh. At least 30 people were killed, while 60 others were injured. This is the sixth crowd crush during the Kumbh Mela in the past 70 years. A second crush in the following hours killed seven people including a three-year-old child. The official death toll count has been disputed, with reports suggesting the actual number of fatalities being higher than the government’s figure. A Newslaundry report based on hospital and police records claims the death toll to be at least 79. These discrepancies have led to criticism of the government’s handling of the incident and calls for greater transparency.

== Background ==
The Kumbh Mela is a Hindu festival which is held every 12 years and lasts for around six weeks. It is considered as one of the most important festivals in the Hindu religious calendar. The 2025 edition was expected to see 400 million people in attendance. Multiple crowd crushes have occurred during the festival, with at least 400 people dying in the 1954 edition and 36 killed in an incident at Railway station at 2013.

== Incident ==
The incident occurred during the Amrit Snan on Mauni Amavasya, which was regarded as the most important day of the festival. On the day of the incident, around 100 million people were expected to be in attendance. The crush started at around 1 am IST, when the crowd surged forward to bathe at the confluence of three rivers, which is considered the holiest place to bathe. The festival's special executive officer Akanksha Rana said the incident began after a festival barrier broke, while Uttar Pradesh chief minister Yogi Adityanath blamed the incident on devotees trying to cross over barricades delineating the designated bathing area for akharas.

As pilgrims tried to escape from the site of the first crush, which officials said was "not serious", they were caught up in another crowd crush at an exit. They then returned towards the pontoon bridges looking for another exit, generating another crush when it was found that the bridges had been closed by authorities. Some attendees resorted to jumping over barricades. Officials tried to divert incoming crowds away from the site of the crush and told them using megaphones to bathe at other locations but were sidelined by attendees.

== Casualties ==
Conflicting reports emerged over the number of casualties, with the number of deaths ranging from 15 people to 79, and the number of injured estimated to be at least 200. The Guardian reported that at least 39 people were killed, with the death toll expected to rise. An investigation by Newslaundry put the toll at 79. A sting operation conducted by 4PM news network, reported the death toll as 58. A BBC investigation identified at least 82 deaths.

The victims were transported to makeshift hospitals at the festival site as well as a hospital in Prayagraj city. Some of them were sleeping on the river bank when they were trampled on by other worshippers trying to bathe. Others sleeping on the river bank were beaten with wooden sticks by police trying to move them before the crowds arrived. Authorities initially denied that the crush or casualties had occurred before announcing on the evening of 29 January that at least 30 people had died.

== Response ==
The Rapid Action Force was deployed to the scene. In a phone call with Uttar Pradesh chief minister Yogi Adityanath, Prime Minister Narendra Modi called for "immediate support measures". He later expressed condolences to the victims. Several Akharas decided to cancel their participation in the Amrit Snan. The Government of Uttar Pradesh ordered a retired judge to conduct an investigation. The administration also revoked VIP passes to streamline people’s entry. Earlier, those having VIP passes were allowed access to tents of Akhadas and sadhus in various sectors.

Leader of the Opposition Rahul Gandhi blamed the incident on "mismanagement" and a "focus on VIP movement" by organisers, which were also part of recurring complaints by ordinary attendees.

Despite the crush, the festival continued, with about 30 million people having taken a bath in the area by 8 am on 29 January. Authorities banned vehicles, except for police vehicles, administration vehicles, ambulances, and other essential service providers, from entering the festival grounds until 4 February.

== See also ==
- 2025 New Delhi railway station stampede
- 1954 Prayag Kumbh Mela stampede
- 2013 Prayag Kumbh Mela stampede
