= Sabarimala stampede =

Sabarimala stampede may refer to these stampedes in Sabarimala Temple, Kerala, India:

- 1999 Sabarimala stampede, a stampede at Sabarimala in January 1999
- 2011 Sabarimala stampede, a stampede at Sabarimala in January 2011
