= Ratangarh Mata Temple =

Hindu temple in Datia, Madhya Pradesh, India

Coordinates: 26°5′46″N 78°37′30″E

Ratangarh Mata Temple is a Hindu temple in Datia Bundelkhand, Madhya Pradesh, India. It is dedicated to Shakti.

== History ==
It is believed that Samarth Ramdas, guru of Maratha king Shivaji, camped here to plan Shivaji's rescue from Agra Fort in 1666. Shivaji's cavalry commandos brought him at Ratangarh Mata Temple after the rescue as it was too dense of a jungle for the Mughal army to comb.

== Stampede ==
October 13, 2013, a stampede broke out during the Navratri festival, near the Ratangarh Mata Temple, killing 115 people and injuring more than 100.

== See also ==
- 2013 Madhya Pradesh stampede
- List of deadly human stampedes in Hindu temples
- List of human stampedes
