= Prayag Kumbh Mela =

Gathering or a fair held every 12 years at Prayagraj in India

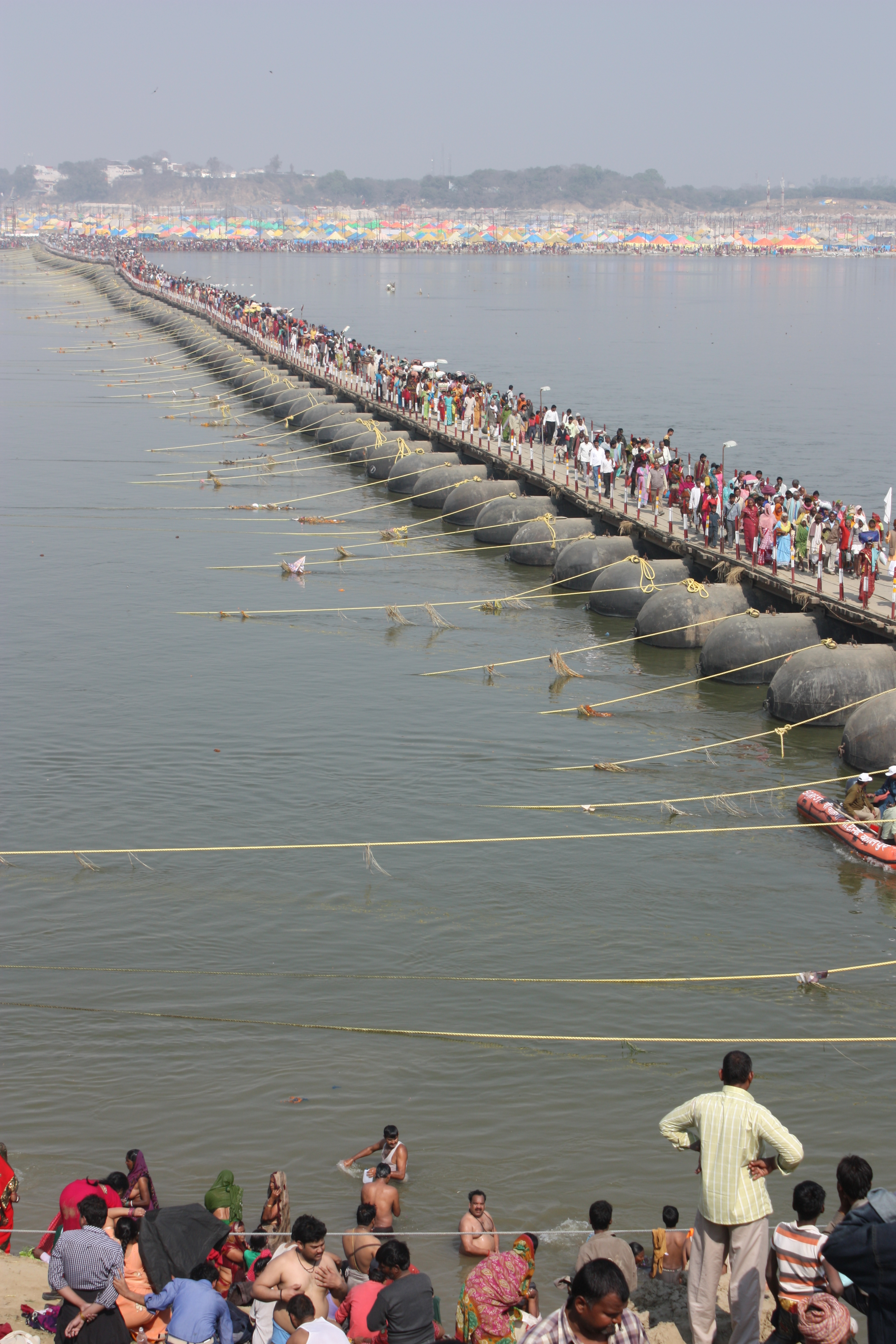
- 2013 Maha Kumbh Mela
- Status: Active
- Genre: Fair
- Frequency: Every 12 years
- Venue: Triveni Sangam
- Locations: Prayagraj, Uttar Pradesh
- Coordinates: 25.431°N 81.885°E
- Country: India
- Previous event: 2025 (Purn Kumbh / Maha Kumbh Mela)
- Next event: 2031 (Ardh Kumbh Mela)
- Participants: Akharas, pilgrims and merchants
- Budget: est. ₹4,200 crores
- Major events: Rituals
- Organiser: Prayag Mela Authority
- Sponsor: East India Company until 1857; British Raj until 1947; thereafter Government of India.
- Website: kumbh.gov.in

The Prayag Kumbh Mela, also known as Allahabad Kumbh Mela, is a mela, or religious gathering, associated with Hinduism and held in the city of Prayagraj, India, at the Triveni Sangam, the confluence of the Ganges, the Yamuna, and the mythical Sarasvati river. The festival is marked by a ritual dip in the waters, but it is also a celebration of community commerce with numerous fairs, education, religious discourses by saints, mass feedings of monks or the poor, and entertainment spectacle. Approximately, 660 million people attended the 2025 Prayag Maha Kumbh Mela, 50 and 30 million people attended the Prayagraj Ardh Kumbh Mela in 2019 and Maha Kumbh Mela in 2013 respectively to bathe in the holy river Ganges, making them the largest peaceful gathering events in the world.

The full Kumbh mela is held every 12 years, while an ardha (half) mela is held after about 6 years at the same site. The 2013 Kumbh mela was the largest religious gathering in the world with almost 120 million visitors. An Ardh Kumbh Mela was held in early 2019. The most recent was held in 2025 which was a Maha Kumbh held after 12 Purn Kumbhs (144 years, lastly in 1881). The next Purn Kumbh mela is scheduled for 2037 (Ardh Kumbh in 2031) and next Maha Kumbh for 2169. The exact date is based on the Hindu luni-solar calendar and is determined by the entry of planet Jupiter in Taurus zodiac and while the sun and the moon is in Capricorn. (Note: Approximately once a century, the Kumbh mela returns after 11 years. This is because of Jupiter's orbit of 11.86 years. With each 12 year cycle per the Gregorian calendar, a calendar year adjustment appears in approximately 8 cycles.)

The Mela is one of the four fairs traditionally recognised as Kumbh Melas. An annual fair, known as Magh Mela, has been held at Prayag Triveni sangam since ancient times (at least early centuries CE). The site, its sacredness, bathing pilgrimage and the annual festival is mentioned in the ancient Puranas and the epic Mahabharata. The festival is also mentioned in later era texts such as those by Muslim historians of the Mughal Empire. However, these sources do not use the phrase "Kumbh Mela" for the bathing festival at Allahabad. The earliest mention of a Kumbh Mela at Allahabad occurs only after the mid-19th century in colonial era documents. The Prayagwals (local Brahmins of Prayag) are believed to have adopted the 6 year kumbha, the 12-year cycle of the historic Maha Kumbh Mela and annual Magh Mela around this time. Since then, every 12 years, the Magh Mela turns into a Maha Kumbh Mela, and six years after a Kumbh Mela, it is an Ardh Kumbh ("Half Kumbh") or Kumbh Mela.

== Dates ==
The Kumbh Mela at Allahabad is held in the month of Magh when Jupiter is in Aries, and Sun and Moon are in Capricorn; or Jupiter is in Taurus, and Sun in Capricorn. However, at times this astrological combination (Kumbh Yoga) does not coincide with the month of Magh. In such a case, the mela is still held in Magh. For example, the 1989 Kumbh Mela should have begun in mid-March according to astrological calculations; however, it started in January.

There have been multiple incidences of Hindu astrologers disagreeing over the exact condition that ushers in a mela. As a result, fairs claimed to be Kumbh Melas have been at the same place in successive years. For example, 1941 and 1942 in Allahabad; and again, 1965 and 1966 in Allahabad.

== History ==
According to Hindu mythology, Vishnu dropped drops of amrita (the drink of immortality) at four places, while transporting it in a kumbha (pot). These four places, including Prayagraj, are identified as the present-day sites of the Kumbh Mela. The river-side fair at Prayagraj is centuries old, but its association with the kumbha myth and a 12-year old cycle dates back to the 19th century. The priests of Prayagraj borrowed these concepts from the Haridwar Kumbh Mela and applied it to their local Magh Mela, an annual celebration. The Magh Mela probably dates back to the early centuries CE, and has been mentioned in several Puranas.

=== Early records of the Magh Mela ===
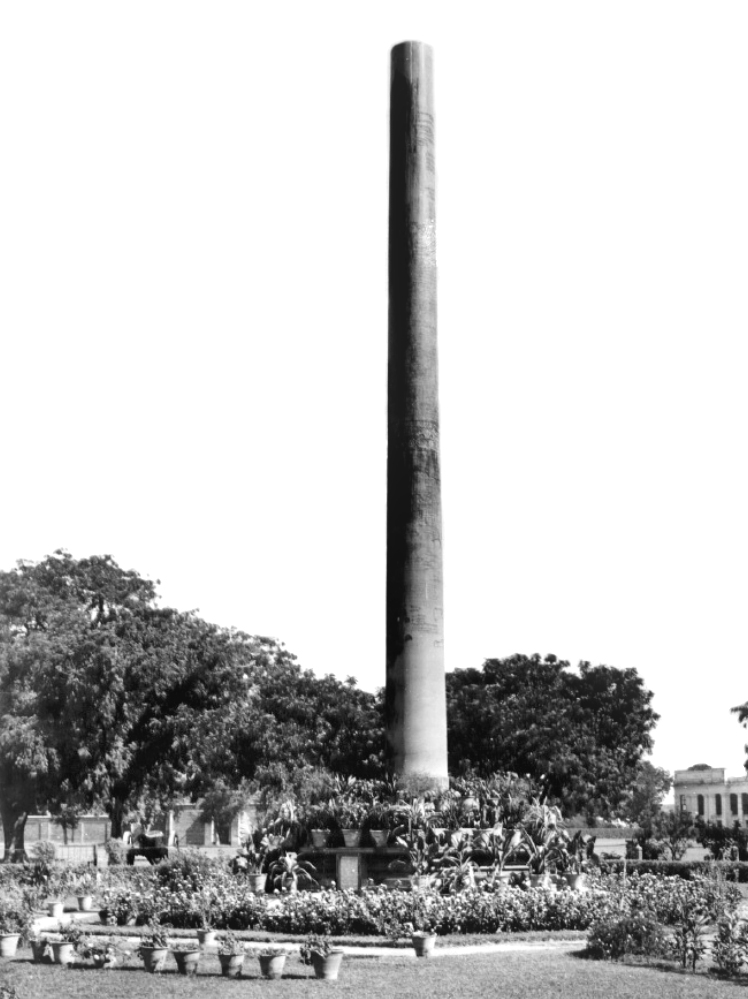
The Ashoka pillar at Prayagraj (photo c. 1900) contains many inscriptions since the 3rd century BCE. Sometime around 1575 CE, Birbal of Akbar's era added an inscription that mentions the "Magh mela at Prayag Tirth Raj".

The writings of the Chinese traveller Xuanzang (Hiuen Tsang) possibly contain a reference to an ancient version of this fair in 644 CE. Xuanzang mentions that Emperor Shiladitya (identified with Harsha) distributed his wealth among the public once every five years; his treasury was then replenished by his vassals. He describes such a ritual at a site located at the confluence of two rivers, in the kingdom of Po-lo-ye-kia (identified with Prayaga). He also mentions that many hundreds take a bath at the confluence of two rivers, to wash away their sins. According to some scholars, this is earliest surviving historical account of the Kumbh Mela or its predecessor. However, Australian researcher Kama Maclean notes that the Xuanzang reference is about an event that happened every 5 years (and not 12 years), and might have been a Buddhist celebration (since, according to Xuanzang, Harsha was a Buddhist emperor).

A common conception, advocated by the akharas, is that Adi Shankara started the Kumbh Mela at Prayag in the 8th century, to facilitate meeting of holy men from different regions. However, academics doubt the authenticity of this claim.

There is no record of a Kumbh Mela with a 12-year cycle at Prayag before the 19th century. The Prayag Mahatmya section of the Matsya Purana states the exalted holiness of Prayag in the Magha month, but does not mention any "Kumbh Mela". Bengal's prominent spiritual leader Chaitanya visited Prayag in 1514, and participated in a bath on the Makara Sankranti. The Bengali language source Chaitanya Charitamrita mentions that he visited a Magh Mela (and not a Kumbh Mela). The 16th century Ramcharitmanas of Tulsidas mentions the mela in Allahabad as an annual one, but does not contain any reference to a 12-year cycle. Tabaqat-i-Akbari (c. 1590s) of Nizamuddin Ahmad also mentions that the mela as annual. It states that after the rabi harvest, Hindus came to the Triveni Sangam in such large numbers that the jungles and the plains were not sufficient to hold them. Ain-i-Akbari, also from the 16th century, mentions that Allahabad is especially holy in the month of Magha. Khulasat-ut-Tawarikh (c. 1695-1699) uses the term "Kumbh Mela" to describe only the Mela at Haridwar; it only mentions the existence of an annual Mela at Allahabad. Yadgar-i-Bahaduri (1834 CE) similarly mentions that the mela at Allahabad is held every winter in Magha, when the sun enters the Capricorn.

The British East India Company gained control of the Prayagraj area after the Treaty of Allahabad in 1765. The early British records contain detailed information about the annual Magh Mela at Prayagraj, collected for tax-related and administrative purposes. But none of these records call the mela by the name "Kumbh", nor do they suggest any specific significance (such as larger crowds) to a Mela held every 12th year. In contrast, there are multiple references to the name "Kumbh Mela" as well as a 12-year cycle for the Haridwar Kumbh Mela. There are several records of applications from Hindu princes seeking tax-free attendance at the Mela at Prayagraj. Again, all of these describe the mela as an annual one. Bholanath Chunder (1869) of Asiatic Society also mentions "the especial great mela" at Allahabad as an annual one, held in January.

=== Company-era Magh Melas ===
Some of the Company-era Magh Melas include:

==== 1790 ====
A letter from Scindia praises a Muslim named Mir Muhammad Amjad for rendering good service to Hindu pilgrims from the Deccan. Amjad was an officer of Asaf-ud-daula. Asaf-ud-Daula, the Nawab of Awadh, greatly reduced the pilgrim tax this year.

==== 1801 ====
The Company outsourced the tax collection at the mela to a native to escape the complexity of the tax system as well as the accusations of profiting from the non-Christian practices.

==== 1806 ====
The Company took over the pilgrim tax collection, and imposed a tax of ₹ 1 for anyone who wanted to bathe at the Mela. According to Welsh travel writer Fanny Parkes, the tax was severe: in those days 1 rupee was enough to keep a man "in comfort for one month". Another contemporary source puts the tax imposed by company at ₹ 3 and mentions greater expense is incurred in charity and gifts to Brahmins sitting by the river side.

==== 1808 ====
The Company announced waiving of pilgrim taxes for native soldiers wishing to bathe at Allahabad. This move was intended at strengthening their loyalty to the British government.

==== 1812 ====
The Company made arrangements for a "great" congregation of people at the "melah" that had not occurred in 28 years.

==== 1833 ====
Bishunath Singh, the prince of Rewa, refused to pay tax on the grounds that he did not take a bath. However, the local British Collector sent Rewa a tax bill of ₹ 5,490 (a hefty amount in those days), on the basis that he had employed Prayagwals, and people in his retinue had their heads tonsured.

==== 1836 ====
The Raja of Rewa requested the British to grant a tax exemption for his 5000-strong retinue. The British agreed to grant an exemption only for 1000 people. An angry Raja abandoned his trip to Allahabad.

==== 1840 ====
The British abolished the pilgrim taxes as "a measure calculated to augment the popularity of Government... in these disaffected times". A huge number of people attended the Magh Mela that year. A stampede occurred, in which 2 people were killed and another 2 were injured.

==== Others ====
Like the Haridwar mela, the Prayag mela also had a mercantile component, but on a far smaller scale. European traveller Charles James C. Davidson visited the fair twice, and described it in his book Diary of Travels and Adventures in Upper India (1843). According to him, the wares put up for sale at the mela were low-value items "usually found in all Indian fairs".

=== Transformation of the Magh Mela into Kumbh Mela ===
It is difficult to determine the exact year in which the Magh Mela was first celebrated as a Kumbh Mela. The 1870 fair at Allahabad is the earliest fair that is described as a "Kumbh Mela" by contemporary sources. The previous Kumbh Mela would have been scheduled in 1858; but that year, no fair was held in Allahabad because of disturbances resulting from the 1857 uprising. Before that, a Kumbh Mela would have been held in 1846, but there are no records to suggest this. In 1874, G. H. M. Ricketts — the Commissioner of Allahabad — wrote that the fair became more sacred every seventh year, and attracted a larger number of pilgrims and merchants. Beyond this, he wrote, the administration had little knowledge of the factors that resulted in increased or decreased attendance at the fair in a given year.

The earliest reference to a Kumbh Mela at Allahabad is from a British report of 1868. In this report, G. H. M. Ricketts (then the Magistrate of Allahabad) discusses the need for sanitation controls at the "Coomb fair" (Kumbh Mela) to be held in 1870. He also mentions that he had witnessed huge crowd at an "Ad Coomb" (Ardh Kumbh) four years earlier. In his report on the 1870 Magh Mela, the Commissioner of Allahabad J. C. Robertson also stated that this year's fair was a "Koombh". This report is also the earliest extant source that mentions a procession of sadhus at Allahabad; this procession occurs only during a Kumbh Mela, and not during a Magh Mela.

Historian Kama Maclean hypothesizes that the 1870 Mela was the first fair at Allahabad to be called a "Kumbh Mela". Historically, the Magh Mela has been an important source of income for the Prayagwal Brahmins of Allahabad. The British attempts to profit from the Mela by imposing a hefty religious tax on the pilgrims brought the Company into direct conflict with the Prayagwals. Even after the Company abolished the pilgrim tax in 1840, it continued to levy taxes on traders and service providers (such as barbers) at the Mela. The first British reference to the Kumbh Mela in Prayag occurs only in an 1868 report, which mentions the need for increased pilgrimage and sanitation controls at the "Coomb fair" to be held in January 1870. According to Maclean, the Prayagwals coopted the Kumbh legend and brand from Haridwar to the ancient annual Prayag Magh Mela given the socio-political circumstances in the 19th century.

=== Christian missionaries attack on Hinduism ===
The Prayagwals along the general Hindu community disliked the presence of Christian missionaries at the Mela. Prayagwals objected to and campaigned against the colonial government supported Christian missionaries and officials who treated them and the pilgrims as "ignorant co-religionists" and who aggressively tried to convert the Hindu pilgrims to a Christian sect. According to Maclean, the missionaries distributed literature – printed in Indian languages – at the large pilgrimage gathering of Hindus at Allahabad. These attacked the Hindu "devotional practices", "Rama and Lachmad [sic]", the idolatry and Hindu rituals. Some of the missionary literature accused the Prayag pilgrimage as "mere superstition" and "not even sanctioned in the higher sacred books of the Hindus".

The Prayagwals and other Hindus found this offensive. They argued – "powerfully" states Maclean – that Hindus were not given the freedom under the British government to enter Christian premises, set up camps, preach and distribute their religious material to Christians near their churches or criticise Christianity on Christian festivals. In contrast, the Christian missionaries under the protection of the British government do exactly that to the Hindu community that gathers to celebrate their own festival. This orientalist discrimination, the newspapers stated was because of "the helplessness of the mild Hindu who identifies his Christian rulers with the Padres and fears to raise his hand against the White Preacher or his black converts." The government ignored these petitions, states Maclean, "perhaps recognizing that once missionaries had been excised from the [Kumbh] mela, government would be next". Despite the aggressive proselytisation methods used by Christian missionaries at the Prayag Kumbh melas, states Maclean, they had little success in converting any Hindus there. However, it did help develop vibrant Hindu-owned printing press operations, in reaction to the Christian missionary tactics, that began publishing and widely distributing pro-Kumbh mela, pro-Hindu and anti-colonial literature.

=== 1857 rebellion ===
The colonial government accused the Prayagwals of contributing to the unrest in Allahabad and in part, for the outbreak of the 1857 uprising at Allahabad. According to the colonial archives, the Praygawal community helped seed and perpetuate the resistance against the Christian missionaries and the 1857 rebellion to the colonial rule. During the 1857 rebellion, Colonel Neill targeted the Kumbh mela site and shelled the region where the Prayagwals lived, destroying it in what Maclean describes as a "notoriously brutal pacification of Allahabad". Prayagwals too targeted and destroyed the "mission press and churches in Allahabad". Once the British had regained control of the region, the Prayagwals were persecuted by the colonial officials, some convicted and hanged, while others – for whom the government did not have proof enough to convict – were persecuted nevertheless. Large tracts of Kumbh mela lands near the Ganga-Yamuna confluence were confiscated and annexed into the government cantonment. In the years after 1857, the Prayagwals and the Kumbh Mela pilgrim crowds carried flags with images alluding to the rebellion and the racial persecution. The British media reported these pilgrim assemblies and protests at the later Kumbh Mela as "strangely hostile" and with "disbelief", states Maclean.

== British Raj ==
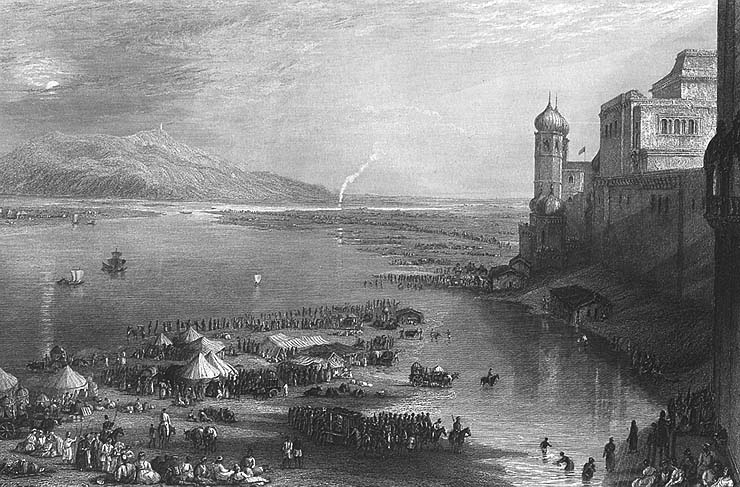
Kumbh Mela in the 1850s

Mid-19th century onwards, the improving road and railway networks helped the pilgrims. However, the attendance varied over time for many reasons and reliable estimates of attendance are scant. The historical and modern estimates of attendance vary greatly between sources. For example, the colonial era Imperial Gazetteer of India reported that between 2 and 2.5 million pilgrims attended the Kumbh mela in 1796 and 1808, then added these numbers may be exaggerations. Between 1892 and 1908, in an era of major famines, cholera and plague epidemics in British India, the pilgrimage dropped to between 300,000 and 400,000.

The British government collected taxes, as well as began managing the camping and mela services particularly from the 1860s onwards. It allowed missionaries to camp and distribute their literature, appointed Muslim officials to manage the festival reasoning they were more indifferent to the holy men and "superstitions" at the festival, gave official licences to "gambling carnivals". The Hindus objected to these appointments and licences, petitioned against the voyeurism, found the favouritism to and presence of Muslim officials as unacceptable and asked for Hindu officials to lead the festival. Over time, the communal sentiments intensified and the Kumbh mela became an "ideal place to articulate and promote Hindu interests". However, the Kumbh festival itself remained peaceful and "not a venue for Hindu-Muslim violence", states Maclean.

=== Kumbh Mela, 1882 ===
The mela became a source of scandal when a Muslim named Husain was appointed as the Kumbh Mela manager, and Indian newspaper reports stated that Husain had "organized a flotilla of festooned boats for the pleasure of European ladies and gentlemen, and entertained them with dancing girls, liquor and beef" as they watched the pilgrims bathing.

=== Ardha Kumbh Mela, 1888 ===
A Christian missionary asked the government not to get involved in organisation of Kumbh Mela as it made them complicit in idolatry. However, the Magistrate of Allahabad refused to oblige, arguing that the British involvement was necessary to keep the militarised Sadhus under control. Prayag Samachar, a newsletter, blamed Muslims for lighting a fire at the mela. District Magistrate Porter tried to ban nudity, arguing that no Hindu scriptures authorised it. He was supported by the Commissioner of Allahabad, but Lieutenant Governor Auckland Colvin rejected the idea. Colvin, a former Magistrate of Allahabad, argued that there was no need to interfere in a Hindu ceremony which only the Hindus needed to attend.

=== Kumbh Mela, 1894 ===
According to Paramahansa Yogananda in his work the Autobiography of a Yogi, it was during the Kumbh Mela in January 1894 at Prayag that his Guru Sri Yukteswar met Mahavatar Babaji for the first time.

=== Kumbh Mela, 1906 ===
In 1905, a group of prayagwals ceased eating at a charitable feast due to presence of a Muslim police officer. Prayag Samachar, which frequently published communal sentiments – urged the government to ban Muslim police from the area. A clash between the Naga Sadhus occurred at the 1906 Mela. The police ordered a cavalry charge to break up the conflict.

=== Kumbh Mela, 1942 ===
In 1941, the Government banned sale of tickets intending to travel to Allahabad during 4 January - 4 February 1942. Due to Japan's entry into the World War II, the Government wanted to keep the number of attendees low. There were rumours that Japan was going to bomb Allahabad.

Also, in 1941, Daraganj-based Mahanirvani Akhara asked the Government to ban the presence of non-Hindus (Muslim police and Christian missionaries) at the mela. The Akhara also expressed displeasure with granting of official licences to "gambling carnivals" at the mela.

Many newly prosperous villagers started attending the Mela a status symbol, and documented their claimed lineages in the registers of the Pryagwals. Many also documented their land ownership claims in these registers, so that these could be used in court cases, in case of any disputes.

== Independent India ==
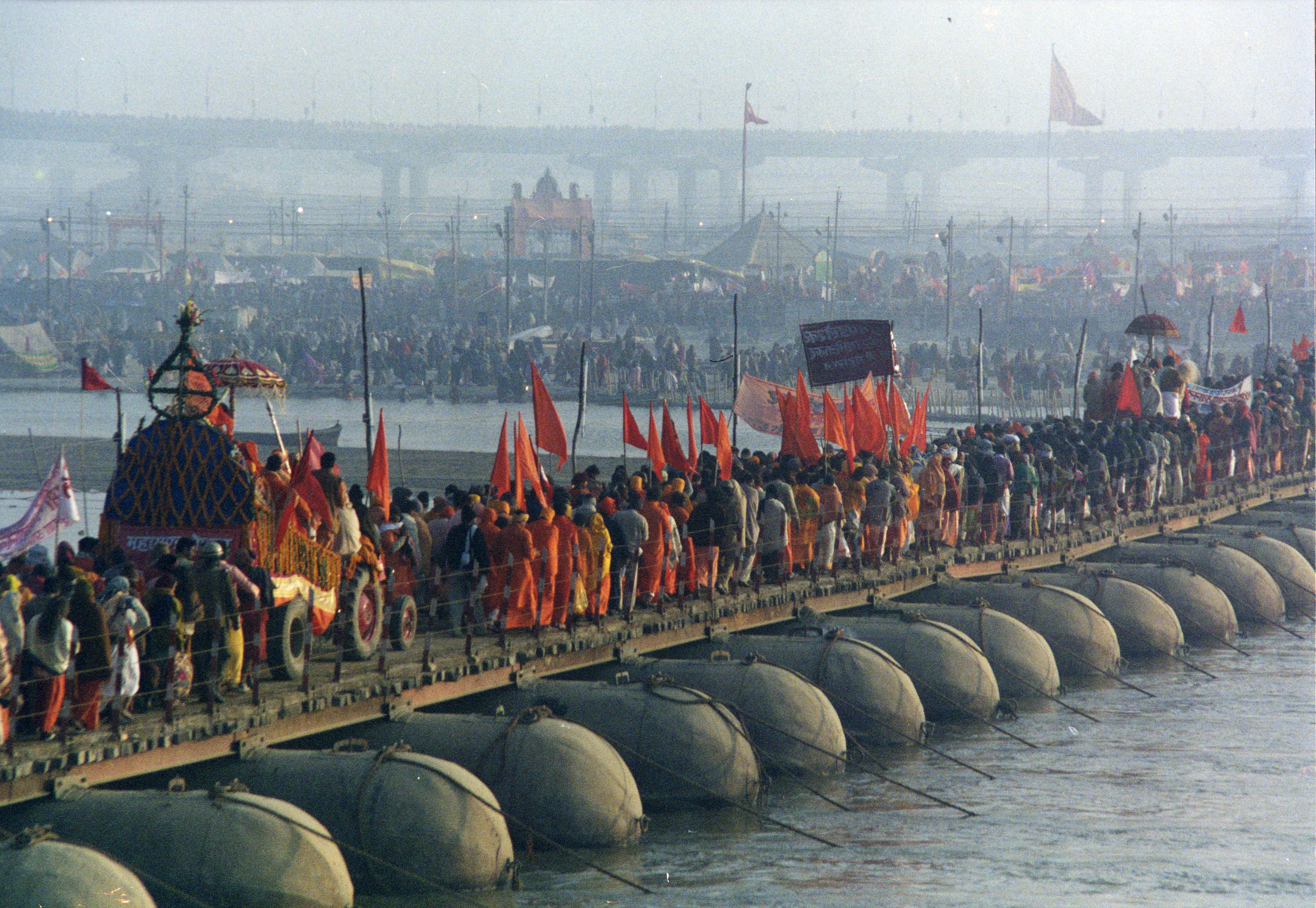
Procession of sadhus at the 2001 Kumbh Mela

=== Kumbh Mela, 1954 ===
Around 800 people were killed in the 1954 Kumbh Mela stampede on 3 February 1954. Around 5 million pilgrims had visited the festival that year.

=== Ardh Kumbh Mela, 2007 ===
More than 70 million people visited Ardh Kumbh Mela during a 45-day period.

=== Kumbh Mela, 2013 ===
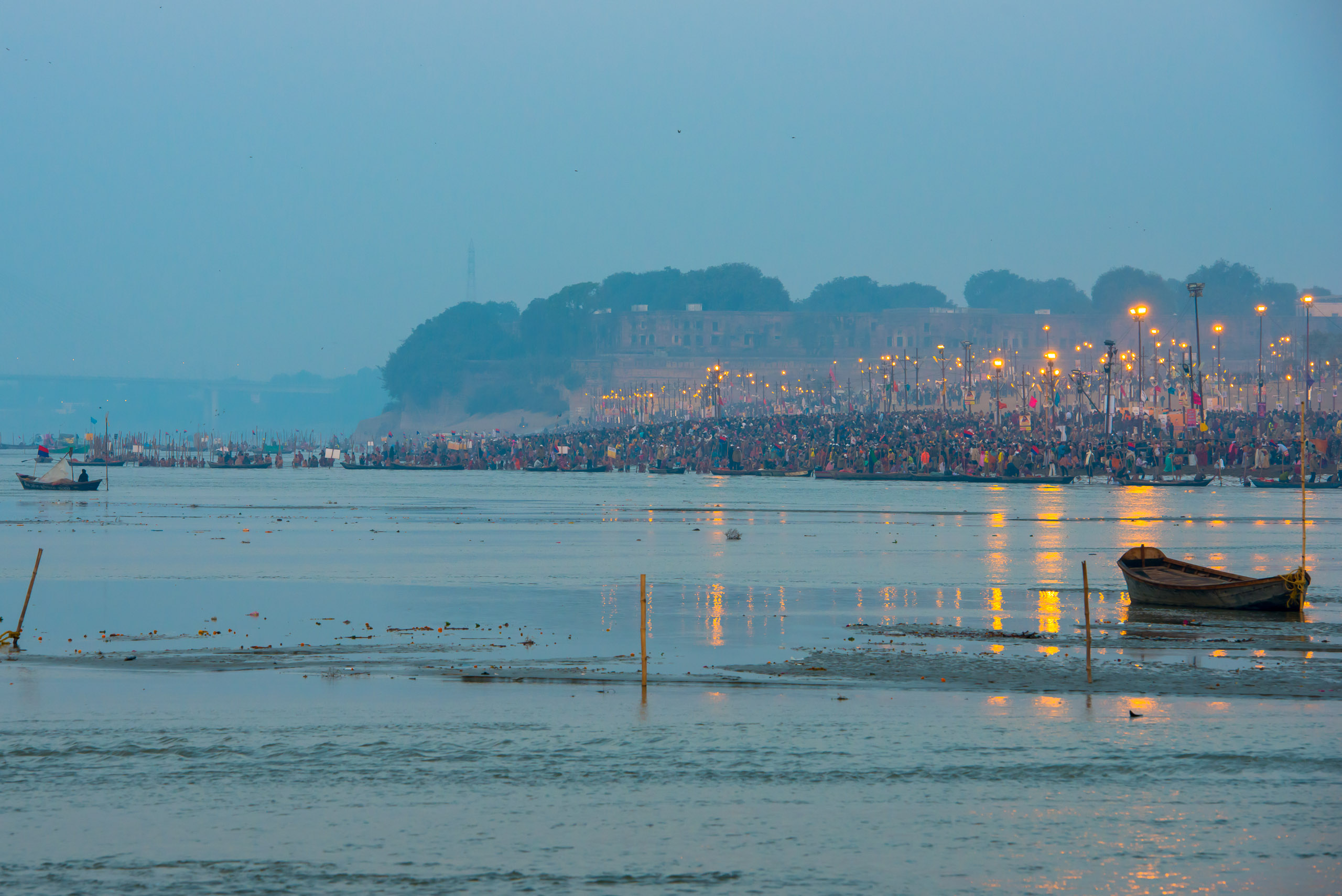
2013 Kumbh Mela

An estimated 120 million people visited Maha Kumbh Mela in 2013 in Prayagraj over a two-month period, including over 30 million on a single day, on 10 February 2013 (the day of Mauni Amavasya).The 2013 festival in Prayagraj was one of the first mass gatherings to have cloud-based near real time disease surveillance.

=== Prayagraj Kumbh 2019 ===
In December 2017, UNESCO declared the Kumbh to be an "intangible cultural heritage of humanity". On 12 December 2017, Yogi Adityanath, the chief minister of Uttar Pradesh, announced the renaming of the "Ardh Kumbh" as the "Kumbh". On 22 December 2017 the Uttar Pradesh Assembly enacted a law setting up the Prayagraj Mela Authority, and implementing the change of name that Adityanath had announced on 12 December. The Hindustan Times suggested that the reason for the changes may have been to increase revenue from tourists. Ram Govind Chaudhary said that the law setting up the authority had many provisions that were against the established tenets of sanatan dharma and Hindu dharma. Suresh Khanna said though the new law was attempting to change the tradition related to Kumbha, it would not change the beliefs and the process of taking the dip in the river.

Around ₹2,500 crore will be allotted by the state government for the Ardh Kumbh 2019, over two times more than it had spent on the last Kumbh held in 2013. About 199 projects of 16 government departments are underway under four phases which includes a six-lane bridge over the Ganges and a four-lane railway over-bridge worth ₹275 crore. The Public Works Department has to execute projects worth ₹430 crore including building an inner ring road in the city. ₹210 crore would be spent on safe drinking water facilities and ₹60 crore to electrify the Kumbh area. Focus is also laid on solid waste management to ensure that Ganga water is not contaminated and putting up LED lights. Moreover, widening and beatification of 18 roads and 25 road crossings is being done with the deadline of October 2017.

=== Prayag Maha Kumbh Mela 2025 ===
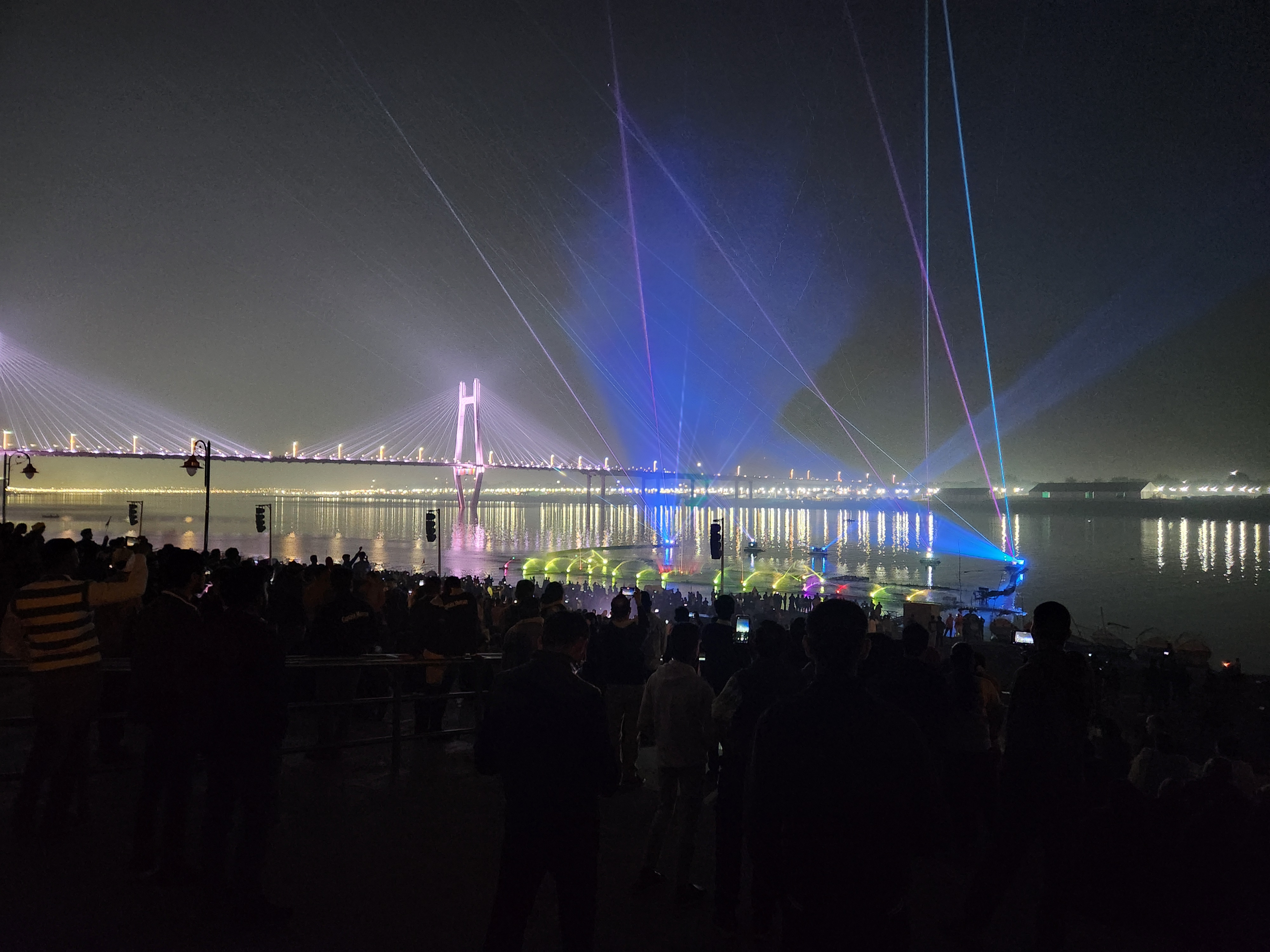
Laser show, Mahakumbh 2025 - Prayagraj view of the Kumbh Mela

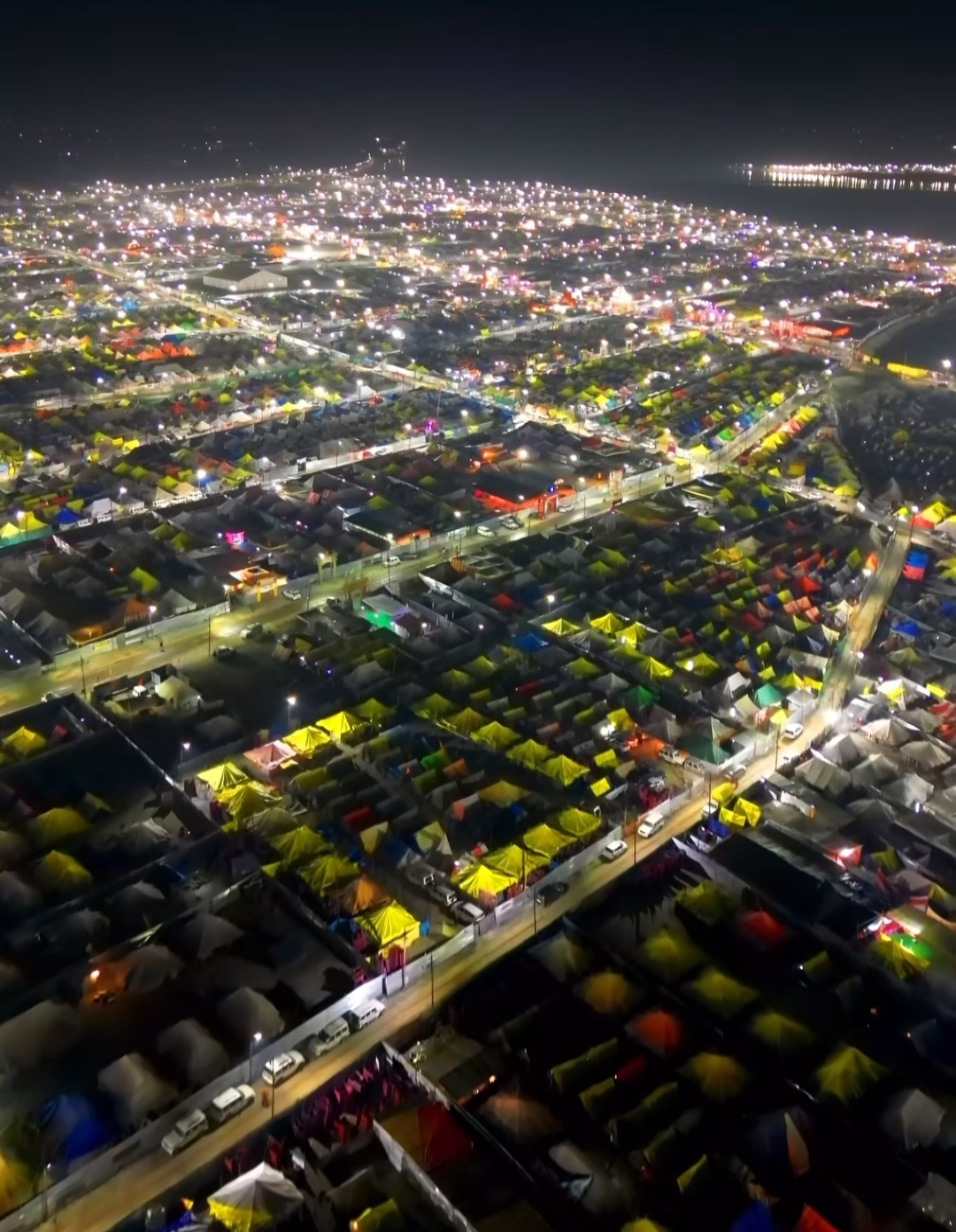
Nighttime view of the Kumbh Mela tents

2025 Maha Kumbh, is the ongoing iteration of the Maha Kumbh Mela. It is scheduled to take place from 13 January to 26 February 2025, at the Triveni Sangam in Prayagraj, Uttar Pradesh, India.

== Stampedes ==
Several stampedes have occurred at the Prayag Kumbh Mela, in 1840, 1906, 1954, 1986, 2013 and 2025. The deadliest of these was the 1954 stampede, which left 800 people dead.
