= Makara Jyothi =

Star appearing at Sabarimala Temple

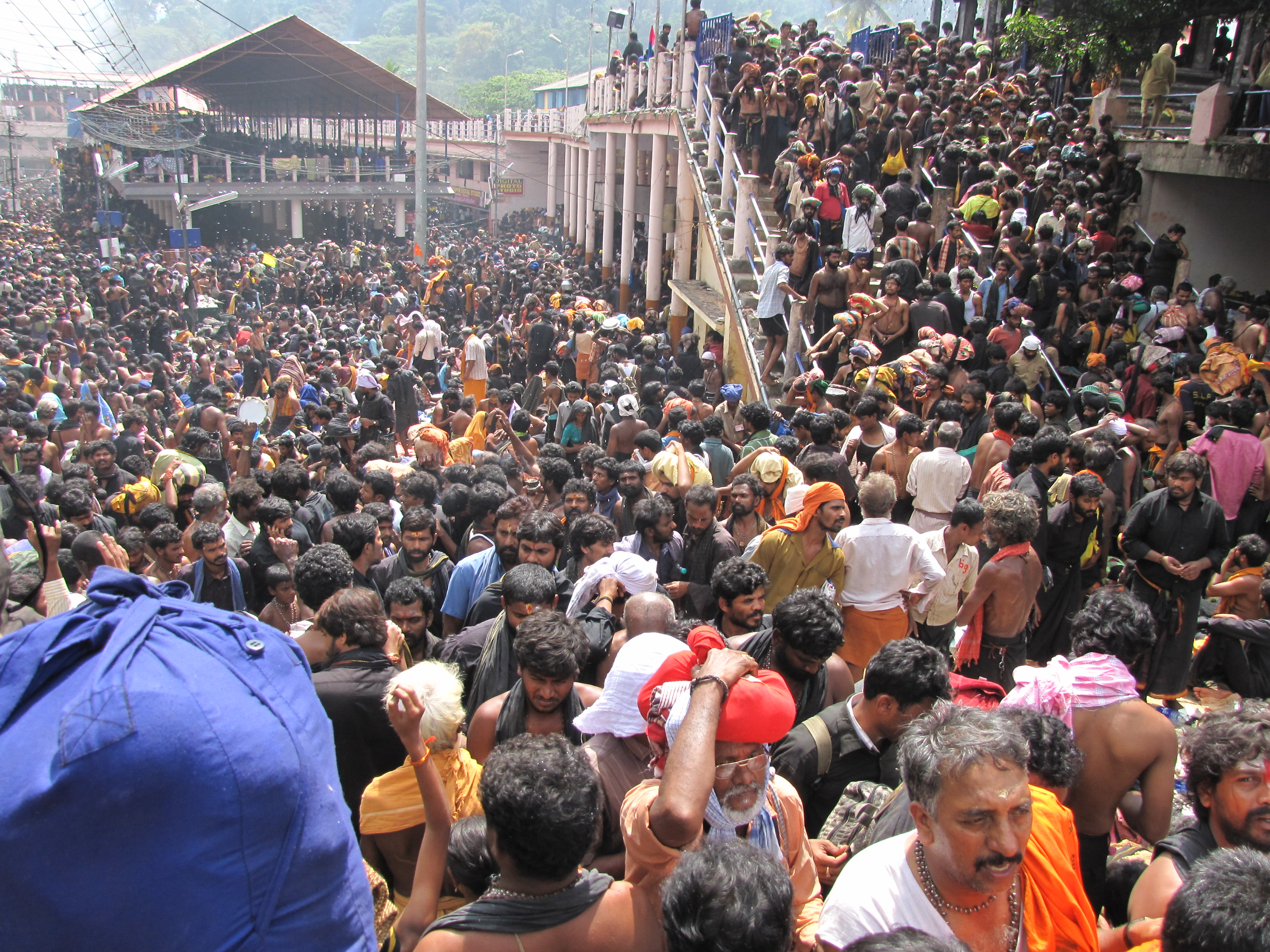
Devotees gathering at Sabrimala sannidhanam to get a glimpse of divya Makara Jyothi around Makaravilakku, in 2010

Makara Jyothi is the celestial star Sirius, which can be seen above the secret firelit event of Makaravilakku. This event takes place annually on Makara Sankranti and is held at Ponnambalamedu, near Sabarimala Temple in Kerala. The event is conducted by the Travancore Devasom Board (TDB), with the help of the Kerala Forest Department, KSEB, Kerala Police and other agencies of the Government of Kerala. When the fire is lit by the TDB team, Sirius can be seen directly above it when viewed from Sabarimala.

In 2008, Raman Nair, who headed the Devaswom Board, said that it was “the police and officials of the Travancore Devaswom Board who would jointly light the fire at Ponnambalamedu" and claimed that this took place on the orders of the state government.

== Etymology ==
Makara (Sanskrit: मकर) is the name of a zodiac sign in Indian languages known as Capricorn in English. Jyoti means "light" in Sanskrit.

== Popularity of the ritual ==
The huge crowd of pilgrims that witnesses the event has increased every year. It is believed that 1.5 million devotees witnessed Makara Jyoti in 2010. The revenue collection during the Makaravilakku period Tas also been increasing: the total donations in 2008 were Rs.725 million, compared to Rs.723 million in 2007.

== Issues ==
=== Stampedes ===
Crowd crushes have occurred twice: In 1999 and 2011, both on the 14 January. These crushes killed 53 and 106 people, respectively. Following both crushes, investigation committees were formed to determine responsibility.

=== Authenticity debate ===
In 1999, the Justice T Chandrasekhara Menon committee that investigated the stampede refrained from going into the details of authenticity of Makara Jyothi. It stated that Makara Jyothi is a matter of belief and could not be investigated, although Justice Menon had probed the veracity of Makara Jyoti and appointed an advocate of the commission to witness it.

Amid a renewed debate after the 2011 stampede, the Kerala High Court aimed to determine whether Makara Jyoti was a man-made phenomenon, asking about the authenticity of the hallowed celestial light visible from Sabarimala. Kantararu Maheswararu, the head of the Thazamon Thanthri family and head priest of the temple, argued that a distinction had to be made between the Makaravilakku and Makara Jyothi: "the Jyothi is a celestial star. Makarvilakku is lit [by people]." After this, M Rajagoplan Nair, president of the TDB, said that it was "known to everybody that Makara Jyothi is a fire lit up by men at Ponnabalamedu" but that there was a Hindu belief behind it.
