= 2019 Prayag Ardh Kumbh Mela =

Ardh Kumbh Mela held in Allahabad from January to March 2019

2019 Prayagraj Ardh Kumbh Mela
- English name: Kumbh festival 2019
- Date: 15 January – 4 March 2019
- Duration: 55 days
- Venue: Triveni Sangam
- Location: Prayagraj; 25.431°N 81.885°E
- Also known as: Ardh Kumbh Mela
- Type: Social practices
- Theme: Festive events
- Cause: Rituals
- Motive: Religious pilgrimage
- Budget: ₹4200 Crores ($605,400,000)
- Patrons: Ascetics, Saints, Sadhus, Sadhvis, Kalpvasis, and Pilgrims
- Organised by: Prayagraj Mela Authority
- Participants: 120 million Hindu devotees
- Website: kumbh.gov.in

The 2019 Prayagraj Ardh Kumbh Mela was the Ardh Kumbh Mela held at Triveni Sangam in Prayagraj, Uttar Pradesh, India from 15 January to 4 March 2019. This event was followed by the 2025 Prayag Maha Kumbh.

== Governance ==
A bill was passed in Uttar Pradesh Legislative Assembly to set up Prayagraj Mela Authority, a permanent body to oversee the mela. The divisional commissioner of Prayagraj serves its chairperson while the district magistrate and inspector general of police as the vice-chairpersons. Mela officers and other district officials are also the members of this authority.

== Projects ==
Around ₹4200 crore was allotted by the state government for the Ardh Kumbh 2019, over twice what it had spent on the previous Kumbh held in 2013. About 199 projects of 16 government departments were completed under four phases which included a six-lane bridge over the river Ganges and a four-lane railway over-bridge worth ₹275 crore. The Public Works Department executed projects worth ₹430 crore including building an inner ring road in the city. ₹210 crore was spent on safe drinking water facilities and ₹60 crore to electrify the Kumbh area. Focus was also laid on solid waste management to ensure that the Ganges is not contaminated as well as putting up LED lights. Moreover, the widening and beautification of 18 roads and 25 road crossings was completed before the deadline of October 2018.

== Promotion ==
The logo of 2019 Kumbh shows a group of Sadhus bathing in the Sangam confluence of the Ganga and the Yamuna. The Uttar Pradesh government has decreed that all state government documents, letterheads and publicity material, including advertisements and hoardings, should carry the new logo. Moreover, cinema halls in the state are directed to display the logo straight after the national anthem is played.

== See also ==
- Prayag Kumbh Mela
