= Ratangarh, Datia =

Coordinates: 26°40′12″N 78°40′22″E

Ratangarh
- Village
- Interactive map of Ratangarh
- Country: India
- State: Madhya Pradesh
- District: datia

Languages
  - Official: Hindi
- Time zone: UTC+5:30 (IST)
- ISO 3166 code: IN-MP
- Vehicle registration: MP
- Nearest city: Datia (M.P)

Ratangarh is a village in the district of Datia, in Madhya Pradesh, India. The village is located in Tehsil Seondha near the Sindh river. The village is located about 60 km from Datia city.

== Village ==
The village is 175 km away from Madikheda Dam in Shivpuri District. Ratangarh is 320 km away from Bhopal the state capital.

== Ratangarh Mata temple ==
The Ratangarh Mata temple is a popular Durga temple in this village. On 13 October 2013, 115 pilgrims were killed and over 100 injured in a stampede at the Mandula Devi temple in Ratangarh.
