= 2025 New Delhi railway station crowd crush =

2025 crowd crush in New Delhi, India

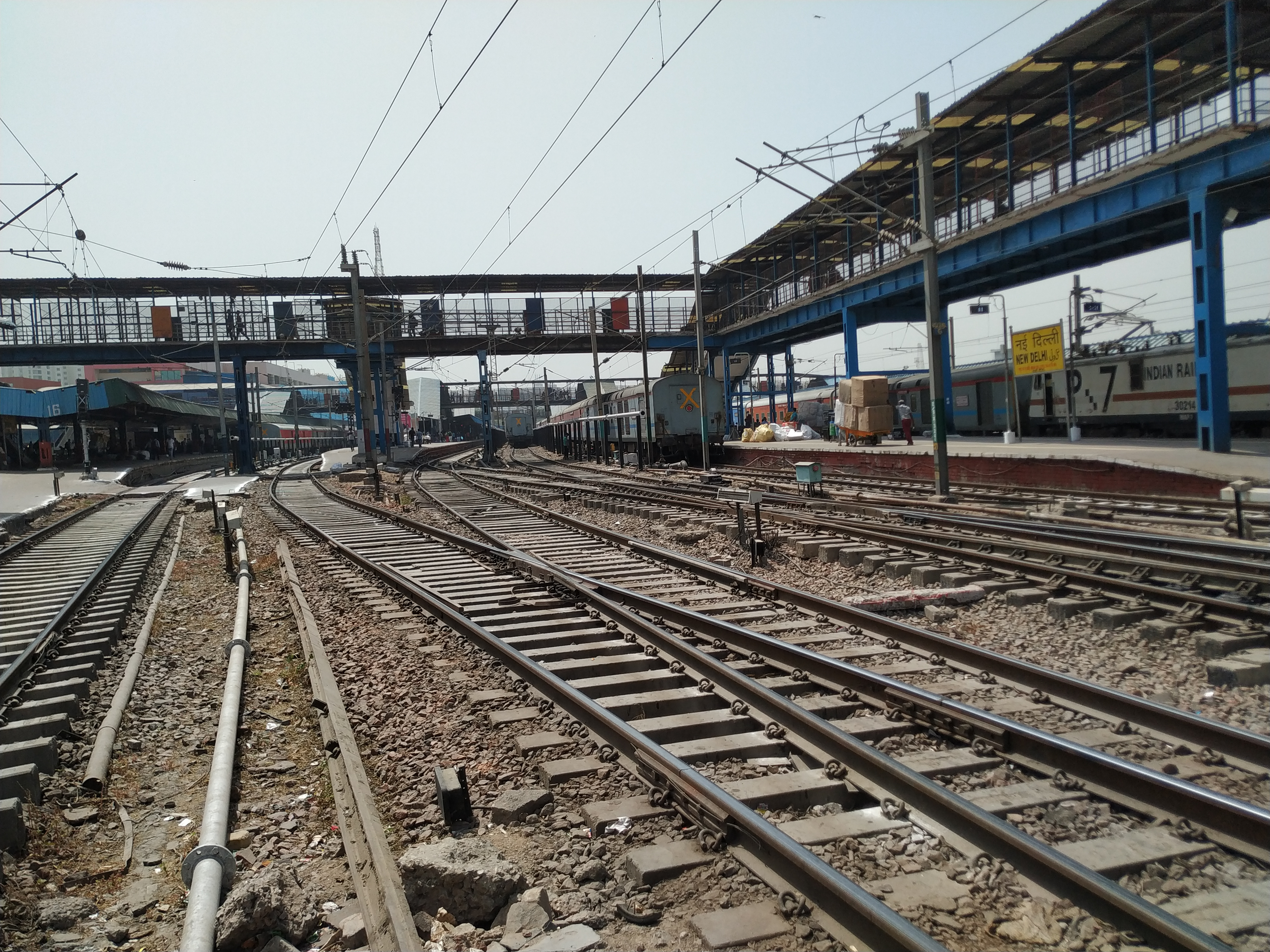
- The footbridge above platforms 14 and 15 of the New Delhi railway station, where the crowd crush took place
- Date: 15 February 2025
- Location: New Delhi railway station, New Delhi, India; 28°38′27.7″N 77°13′17.4″E
- Type: Crowd collapse and crush
- Cause: Train delays leading to overcrowding
- Deaths: 18
- Injuries: 15

On 15 February 2025, a crowd crush killed at least 18 people and injured 15 others at the New Delhi railway station in New Delhi, India. The crush occurred after some passengers began to slip on a footbridge above platforms 14 and 15, causing a crushing pile of people to form in the already overcrowded station.

Leading up to the incident, between 400–500 million Hindu worshipers had been traveling to the religious festival Maha Kumbh in Prayagraj, northern India, a festival which takes place every three years in one of four cities in the country. Overbooking tickets, train delays, and confusion between similar-sounding rail lines all led to the hazardous and crowded conditions which caused the crush. The youngest victim was a 7-year-old girl, and the oldest a 79-year-old woman.

According to The Hindu, the railway and public officials attempted to silence information about the casualties of the crush. Lieutenant Governor of Delhi Vinai Kumar Saxena is reported to have edited a post he made about the incident on X to remove any mentions of the deaths. The information was eventually released, and a ₹1,000,000 ex gratia compensation fund was established for the families of the victims. A high-level investigation made up of a two-member committee was launched to determine the cause of the crush. New crowd control measures including special holding areas and operating manual updates were announced for sixty high-traffic stations following the incident.

== Background ==
In the days leading up to the tragedy, the major religious festival Maha Kumbh had been taking place in Prayagraj, Uttar Pradesh, northern India, about 624 km (388 mi) southeast of the capital of New Delhi. The festival, which ran from 13 January to 26 February 2025, involves devotees bathing in the holy water at the confluence of the Ganges and Yamuna rivers to wash away sins. The festival, which takes place every three years in one of four cities in India, regularly saw a large number of Hindu pilgrims. An estimated 400–500 million believers had visited the festival since it began, more than usual as the festival also coincided with a celestial alignment occurring every 144 years. Despite a prior history of crowd crushes at large religious events in the country, including one which took place just a few weeks prior during the same festival which saw 30 casualties, around 1,500 tickets were regularly sold every hour at the train station, with an excess 2,600 tickets over the 5,000 maximum sold the day of the incident. This caused the platforms, which were only built to hold up to 3,000 passengers comfortably, to be overcrowded.

== Incident ==
I have been working here for nearly 25 years, but have never seen anything like this [crowd] before during the Kumbh Mela

— Railway porter Lakhanlal Meena, reporting on the incident to the magazine Frontline

Between 9:15pm and 9:30pm on February 15, 2025, thousands had gathered to board a train at the New Delhi railway station for the festival. The delay of two trains beforehand, however, had led to many of those waiting to become impatient. Furthermore, confusion between the routes "Prayagraj Special", arriving at platform 16, and "Prayagraj Express", already arrived at platform 14, confused some passengers, making them believe they would miss their train. Additionally, while rope dividers and heightened security was typically present during other large travel seasons like Chhath, no such precautions were in place on 15 February.

While passengers were traversing an overhead footbridge connecting platforms 14 and 15, some began to slip while descending, possibly due to a passenger fainting, which caused a crushing pile of people to form. Alongside the already large amount of people running and pushing to try to board the train, panic quickly arose and the situation deteriorated quickly. According to those who witnessed the crush, the piling of people soon turned into chaos, only worsened after someone in the crowd called "stampede". Railway porters and "coolies" became the first responders to the incident, carrying victims and unconscious passengers away from the crush, as well as using private vehicles to drive them to the nearby Lok Nayak Hospital, as ambulances could not reach the scene. An emergency call was made during the incident at around 9:55pm, where four fire tenders became the first proper emergency staff on the scene, arriving 40–45 minutes after the incident had begun. Police and relief teams later helped to control the situation. According to the coolies and other witnesses originally at the scene, hardly any of the relief help came from the police and railway authorities, recounting that there were only two Railway Protection Force (RPF) authorities present when the incident began. Despite the low number present, video of a RPF woman saving a five-month-old baby from the incident circulated online. Four trains were additionally sent to evacuate the sudden surge of passengers.

== Casualties and information blackout ==
Victims and wounded were brought to Lok Nayak Hospital

According to the Indian newspaper The Hindu, the railway initially tried to prevent news about any casualties from reaching the press. Originally, statements from the railway only said some passengers had been rushed to the hospital. Furthermore, press was not allowed to enter the hospital which received victims from the crush. This was likely due to multiple victims from the crush being crammed onto a single bed due to a lack of space at the hospital, according to the family of some of the victims. In contrast to this information blackout, Union Defence Minister Rajnath Singh and Lieutenant Governor of Delhi Vinai Kumar Saxena posted on X condoling the deaths. Saxena's post was then edited around 12:24am to remove any mention of casualties. Singh's remained unedited, however, and the Chief Casualty Medical Officer at the hospital confirmed the deaths soon after. Only 20 hours after the incident did the railways officially acknowledge any deaths had occurred. Initial reports by the chief minister of the National Capital Territory of Delhi stated there had been 15 casualties and 15 injured. By the following day, this number had increased to 18 casualties: 14 of whom being women, and 5 of whom being children. The youngest victim was a 7-year-old girl and the oldest a 79-year-old woman. Other victims included an 8-year-old girl, a 12-year-old boy, a 15-year-old girl, a 24-year-old woman, a 25-year-old man, nine 35-to-45-year-old women, a 45-year-old man, and a 47-year-old man. Many of the victims were rushed to the nearby Lok Nayak Hospital in New Delhi.

== Response ==
Following the crowd crush, security was heightened at train stations to help in crowd management and to prevent further incidents from immediately occurring. This was accomplished through the deployment of the Government Railway Police (GRP) and Railway Protection Force (RPF) to the area, who used loud speakers to make continuous announcements to the crowds of passengers. Additionally, the four additional trains sent to the station stayed to help carry travelers for the remaining duration of the festival, with five additional trains expected to join in the effort on 17 February. On 17 February 2025, new temporary and permanent holding areas outside the platforms were announced at sixty railways, including New Delhi's, experiencing a high volume of passengers to prevent a similar incident from occurring. These temporary holding areas until trains arrive reportedly had worked well in Prayagraj where the festival was taking place, but had not been implemented at other stations. Furthermore, a separate manual for crowd control was released by Union Minister of Railways Vaishnaw, which included raising awareness for passengers to not sit on the footbridge stairs while waiting, among other advice.

Indian Prime Minister Narendra Modi released a statement that he was "distressed by the stampede." The Delhi High Court on February 19, 2025 ordered the Indian Railways and other stakeholders to find ways to prevent such tragedies from happening again. The Union Minister of Railways Ashwini Vaishnaw stated a high-level investigation made up of a two-member committee had been launched to determine the cause of the crush; consisting of the Northern Railway Principal Chief Commercial Manager (PCCM), Narsingh Deo, and its Principal Chief Safety Commissioner (PCSC), Pankaj Gangwar. All CCTV footage from the station, alongside eyewitness testimony, was being collected for the investigation. No officials have been named responsible for the incident pre-investigation, and the investigation has no deadline for when it is to be completed. The Railway Ministry also announced a ₹1,000,000 compensation to the families of victims, ₹250,000 to those with serious injuries (including 3 people), and ₹100,000 to those with minor injuries (including 12 people). The ex gratia payment notably took place before any official statement about casualties had been made by the railway. Lieutenant Governor of Delhi Vinai Kumar Saxena went to visit some of those injured in the hospital. Opposition leaders in the country criticized the government for not having properly prepared the railways for the festival season, and called for more of the money spent on the advertising the festival to instead go towards safety precautions. General Secretary of the All India Congress Committee, Randeep Surjewala, called on Union Minister of Railways Vaishnaw to resign from the incident.

== See also ==
- 2025 Prayag Maha Kumbh Mela crowd crush
- List of fatal crowd crushes
- 2025 in India
- Crowd collapses and crushes#Crowd "stampedes"
