= 2013 Madhya Pradesh stampede =

Human crush in Pradesh, India

- Date: 13 October 2013
- Location: Ratangarh, Datia, Madhya Pradesh, India; 26°5′34″N 78°38′31″E
- Deaths: 115
- Injuries: 110

On 13 October 2013, during the Hindu festival of Navratri, a stampede broke out on a bridge near the Ratangarh Mata Temple in Datia district, Madhya Pradesh, India, killing 115 people and injuring more than 110.

== Background ==
The stampede occurred during the Navratri festival dedicated to the worship of the Hindu goddess Durga. About 500,000 pilgrims were estimated to have flocked to the Ratangarh Mata Temple, located in the village of Ratangarh in Datia district of Madhya Pradesh in central India. The worshippers were mainly from Datia and the neighbouring state of Uttar Pradesh.

In 2006, 56 pilgrims died at the same site after being washed away by water released upstream from the Sindh River. In response to that disaster, the state government built a bridge over the Sindh. The bridge, located 1.5 kilometres (0.93 mi) from the temple, is 400 metres (1,300 ft) long and 7 metres (23 ft) wide. It was less than four years old and reportedly in good condition when the stampede took place.

== The stampede ==
Approximately 25,000 people were on the bridge at about 9 a.m. on Sunday, 13 October 2013, and a section of the railing was broken. Rumour spread that the bridge was about to collapse, and the crowd panicked and began pushing their way off. Many were killed or injured in the ensuing crush, and others drowned after jumping into the swelling river. Most of the victims were women and children.

There were conflicting reports about the cause of the stampede. One report said that the rumour of the bridge's impending collapse began when a section of the railing broke, but another said that the bridge had been hit by a tractor before the stampede. Others said that a group of pilgrims intentionally spread the rumour, hoping to cut the long line. Some witnesses said that the stampede started when the police charged into the crowd wielding canes, but the allegation was denied by police officials.

== Aftermath ==
Rescue operations were hampered by a 7-kilometre-long traffic jam on the only road to the temple. Angry at the delay, relatives of the victims pelted stones at police officers, injuring several.

News agencies carried reports, including eyewitness reports, that policemen robbed and also threw dead bodies and even living survivors off the bridge into the swollen Sindh River below apparently in an effort to reduce the death count; D. K. Arya, the Deputy Inspector-General of Police (DIG) for the Chambal Range based at Morena categorically denied the possibility.

The Madhya Pradesh government has announced a compensation of Rs. 150,000 for each of the deceased and Rs. 50,000 to those who suffered serious injuries.

Chief Minister Shivraj Singh Chouhan ordered the establishment of a judicial commission to probe allegations of corruption and police misconduct.

The state government suspended the Collector and some police officials in Datia for negligence leading to the stampede.

Congress Party representatives allege that the true death toll is higher, possibly touching 400. The representatives criticized the State Administration for allegedly fudging the records and demanded the resignation of Chouhan, but the ruling BJP rebuffed the demand and accused the Congress Party of playing politics.

== See also ==
- 2013 Kumbh Mela stampede
