= 1954 Prayag Kumbh Mela stampede =

Indian stampede

1954 Kumbh Mela stampede
- Date: 3 February 1954
- Location: Prayagraj, Uttar Pradesh, India
- Cause: failure of crowd control measures
- Deaths: 316–800
- Injuries: 2000

1954 Kumbh Mela crowd collapses was a major crowd crush that occurred on 3 February 1954 at Kumbha Mela in Prayagraj in Uttar Pradesh state in India. It was the main bathing day of Mauni Amavasya (New Moon), when the incident took place. 4–5 million pilgrims took part in the festival that year, which was also the first Kumbh Mela after India's Independence.

The figures for the tragedy varied according to different sources. Officially, 316 people lost their lives. While The Guardian reported more than 800 people died, and over 100 were injured, TIME reported "no fewer than 350 people were trampled to death and drowned, 200 were counted missing, and over 2,000 were injured". According to the book Law and Order in India, over 500 people died.

== Reasons and aftermath ==
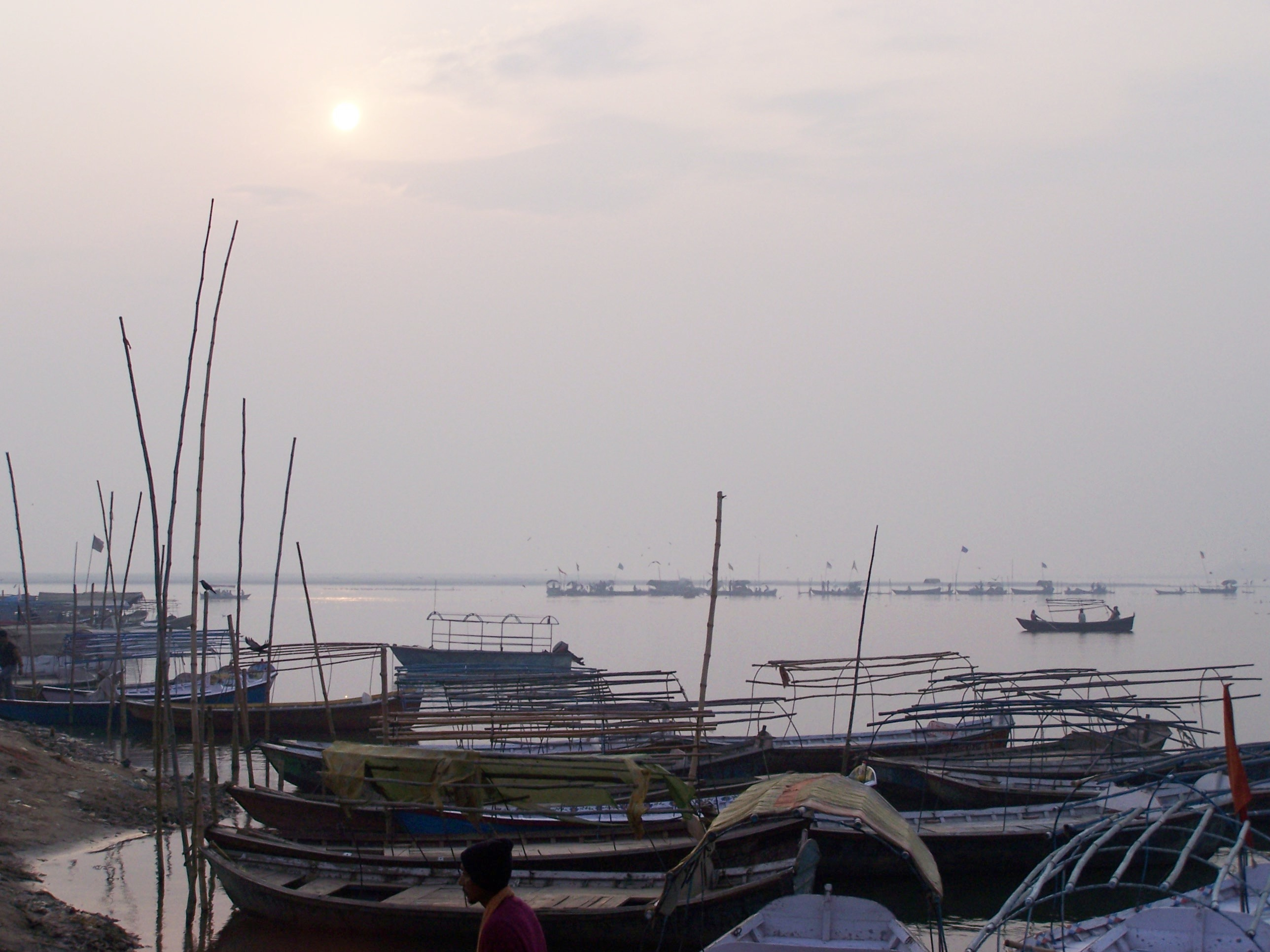
The Triveni Sangam, or the intersection of Yamuna River and Ganges River and the mythical Saraswati River, where devotees perform rituals, and the site of the great baths during the Kumbh Mela

The 1954 Kumbh Mela occasion was used by politicians to connect with the Indian populace as the first Kumbh Mela after Independence in 1947, with more than 5 million pilgrims in attendance for the 40-day festival, at Allahabad, (today known as Prayagraj); many leading politicians visited the city during the event.

In addition to the compounding failures of crowd control measures, and the presence of a large number of politicians, a major factor contributing to the incident was that the Ganges River had changed course and moved in closer to the Bund (embankment) and the city, reducing the available space of the temporary Kumbh township, and restricting movement of the people. Ultimately, what triggered the tragedy was a crowd surge that broke through the barriers, separating them from a procession of sadhus and holy men of various akharas, resulting in the fatal crush.

After the event, Prime Minister Jawahar Lal Nehru suggested that politicians and VIPs should refrain from visiting the Mela, and were all exonerated, along with the government, of any wrongdoing after an inquiry. The judicial inquiry commission, set up after what was one of the worst crowd crushes in India's history, was headed by Justice Kamala Kant Verma, and its recommendations became the basis for better management of future events in the coming decades. This tragedy has stood as a grim reminder to Mela planners and district administrators. Over the years, the crowds have progressively increased, so much so that 80–100 million people took part in the 2010 Kumbh Mela, making it the largest gathering anywhere in the world. Among the other fatal Kumbh Mela crushes, the most notable have been in the years 1840, 1906, 1954, 1986, 2003 (39 deaths), 2010 (7 deaths), 2013 (36 deaths) and 2025 (30 deaths).

== In popular culture ==
- There is a reference to the 1954 Kumbh Mela Stampede in the 1993 novel A Suitable Boy by Vikram Seth. In the novel, the event is called "Pul Mela" instead of "Kumbh Mela". It is also depicted (again as "Pul Mela") in the 2020 television adaptation.
- In the novel written by Kalkut (Samaresh Basu), Amrita Kumbher Sandhane, the disaster is highlighted along with reaction of the pilgrims. It was later made into a film.

== See also ==
- 2013 Kumbh Mela stampede
- Crowd collapses and crushes § Crowd "stampedes"
