= 1996 Haridwar and Ujjain stampedes =

Crowd crushes in India

The 1996 Haridwar and Ujjain stampedes were two crowd crushes that occurred on 15 July 1996 Kanwar Yatra pilgrimage, in the holy Indian towns of Haridwar and Ujjain, killing 21 and 39, and injuring 40 and 35 Hindu devotees at respective places.

== See also ==
- Crowd collapses and crushes
