= Peshwai Procession =

Peshwai Procession is a royal procession of the Naga Sadhus during Kumbh Mela. The Peshwai marks the arrival of the members of an akhara or sect of sadhus at the Kumbh Mela. The procession pomp and ceremony with elephants, and horses. During the procession, sadhus perform acrobatic skills and breathtaking display of their martial skills with the help of swords.

The term Peshwai means the reception of a guest; the office or function of a Maratha chief (or Peshwa).

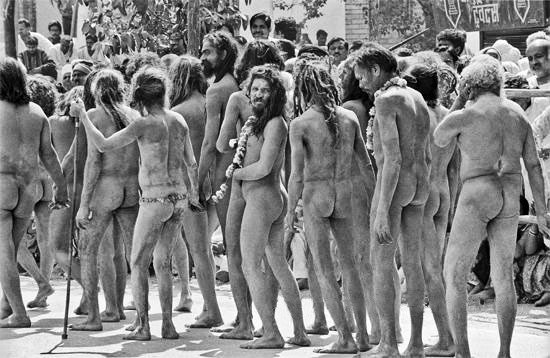
Naga Sadhus at Kumbh Mela

== See also ==
- Kumbh Mela
- Peshwa
