= Satsanga Deoghar disaster =

2012 stampede in India

The Satsang Deoghar disaster is a human stampede that occurred on 24 September 2012, in which twelve people died and thirty people were injured at the Satsang Ashram in Deoghar, Jharkhand.

The tragedy occurred when over 200,000 devotees assembled in the satsang complex in the prayer hall at the samadhi of Anukulchandra Chakravartyto celebrate the 125th anniversary of the ashram.
