= Mauni Amavasya =

Hindu festival in the lunar month of Magha

Mauni Amavasya is a divine occasion in Hindu religious practice followed for honouring ancestors or forefathers. The term Mauni in Sanskrit means silence, hence the day is spent in silence and many religious rites are performed on this day. As the moon plays a significant role in the Hindu calendar for performing religious rituals for ancestors soul, it is also called as Magha Amavasya or New moon day. The word "Mauni" also closely resembles word "Muni" meaning saint. Amavasya is a combination of "ama" meaning together and "vasya" means to live and hence living together.

== Significance ==
Mauni Amavasya, as per the Hindu calendar, is followed on the new moon day of the Magha month. As the name "Mauni" is symbolic of silence,the day is spent in silence.

== Things to avoid ==
On Mauni Amavasya day, it is suggested to avoid below things-

- Avoid lying and remain in silence as much as possible during the day.
- Avoid arguments, quarrels or personal grudges.
- Avoid visiting crematorium.

== Rituals ==
Mauni Amavasya puja rituals are as follows

- Early morning wake up and having holy bath which is believed will remove sins.
- Fasting and remaining silent which helps in restraining thoughts and hence the name Mauni meaning silent.
- Lighting a diya with ghee in remembrance of ancestors and forefathers.
- Performing pitru tarpan or pitru puja if possible.
- Make offering of Arghya to Sun God after holy bath.
- Auspicious for performing Hawan, Gayatri jap or reading Bhagavad Gita.
- As meritorious service feeding Brahmins.

== See also ==
- Amavas
