= 2025 Prayag Maha Kumbh Mela =

Indian fair

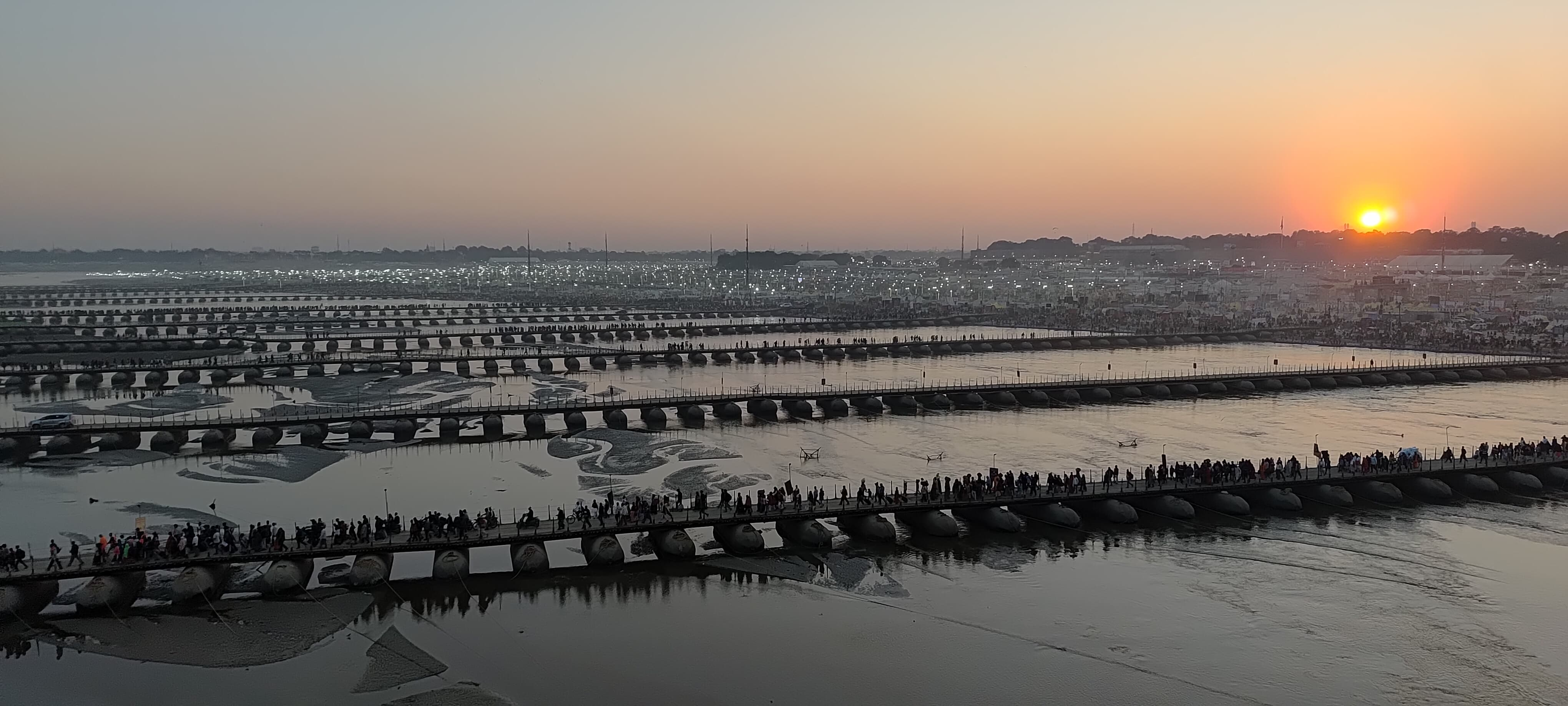
- Pilgrims at Triveni Sangam
- Date: 13 January – 26 February 2025
- Venue: Triveni Sangam
- Location: Prayagraj, Uttar Pradesh, India; 26.431°N 82.885°E
- Type: Hindu festival
- Budget: ₹73.82 billion (US$770 million)
- Patron: Government of Uttar Pradesh
- Organised by: Prayagraj Mela Committee
- Website: kumbh.gov.in

The 2025 Prayag Maha Kumbh Mela was the most recent iteration of the Kumbh Mela, a Hindu pilgrimage festival that marked a full orbital revolution of Jupiter around the Sun. It was scheduled from 13 January to 26 February 2025, at the Triveni Sangam in Prayagraj, Uttar Pradesh, India. It was the world's largest gathering, and according to data released on 26 February, more than 660 million (66 crores) people had taken a dip in the river. This event marked the completion of a 12-year Kumbh Mela cycle and was officially termed a Maha Kumbh Mela, spanning 45 days.

The Kumbh Mela had been organised for many centuries with its commencement date unknown. As per astrological calculations, the 2025 edition was unique since the constellation alignment seen was witnessed once in 144 years. The site of each Kumbh Mela was decided by the astrological alignment of Jupiter, the Sun and the Moon. The Kumbh Mela had been recognised as part of Intangible Cultural Heritage by UNESCO.

== Financials ==
The budget for the event was about ₹63.82 billion (US$660 million) and it is estimated that the event will generate a revenue of more than ₹2 trillion (US$21 billion).

== Infrastructure ==
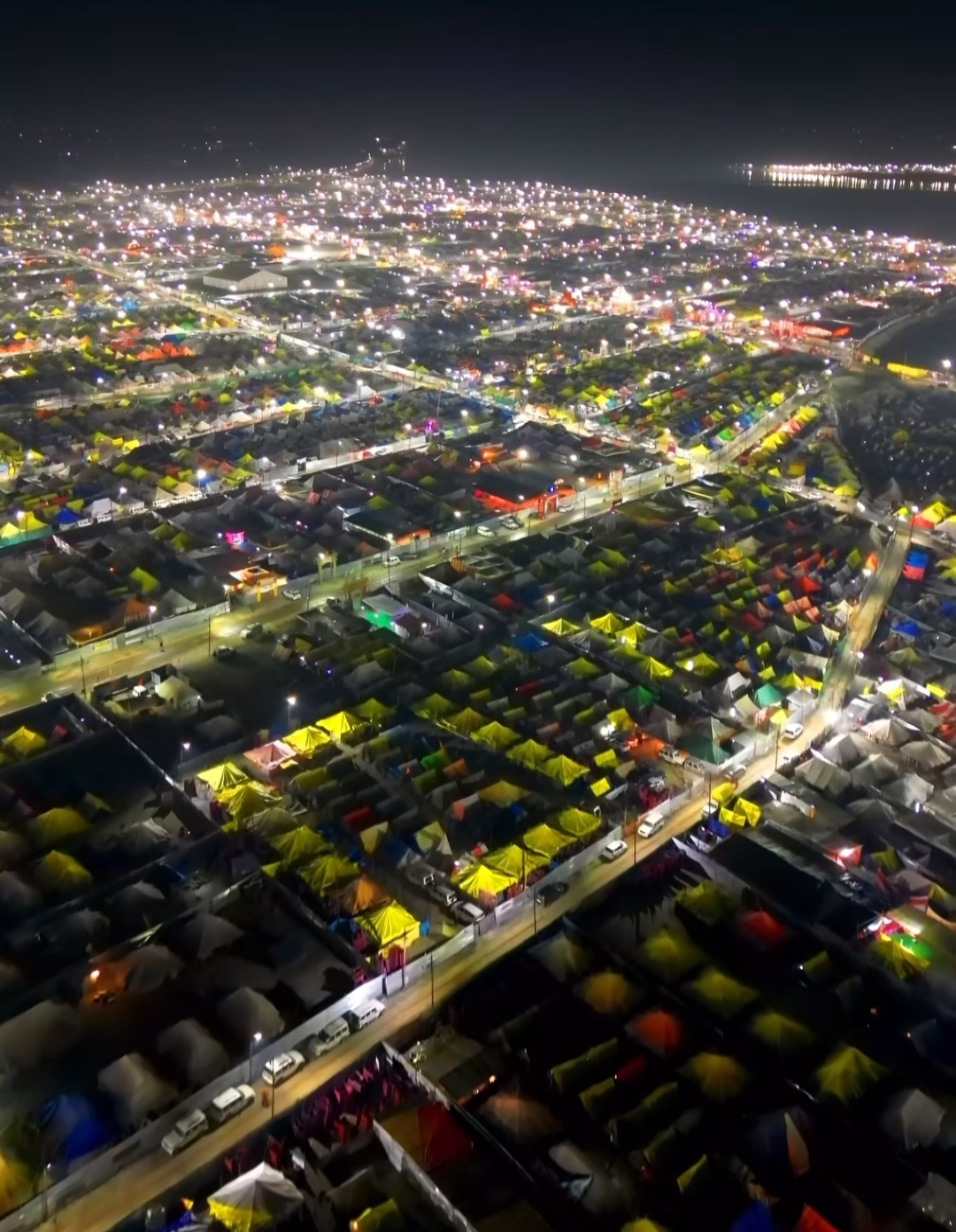
Night time view of the tents in the Kumbh Mela area

The Government of Uttar Pradesh have set up a temporary city covering 4,000 hectares (40 km^{2}) to accommodate the pilgrims attending the event. To expand the available land, four dredging machines were used to reclaim 26 additional hectares (0.26 km^{2}), significantly increasing the capacity to three times more than in 2019 Prayag Ardh Kumbh Mela. Prayagraj is also embracing smart city technologies to enhance urban living. The total length of the ghats is 12 km (7.5 mi), and the surrounding area has been divided into 25 sectors. About 150,000 tents were established to provide accommodation. Nearly 83 projects were completed at a cost of ₹14.28 billion (US$150 million) for the event.

=== Transport ===
Parking facilities cover an area of 1,850 hectares (18.5 km^{2}). The total road length within the area was increased over 450 km (280 mi) to improve accessibility. Indian Railways has announced an increase in the number of coaches in key trains, such as the Prayagraj Express and Lucknow Mail, to accommodate the expected influx of pilgrims during the Mahakumbh 2025. Indian Railways operated special trains to various railway stations in the area. About 360 trains including 190 special trains, 110 regular trains and 60 MEMU trains to cater to the pilgrims on the day of Mauni Amavasya on 29 January 2025. Prayagraj Airport (IATA Code:IXD) is another way to reach out to 2025 Prayag Maha Kumbh Mela from other parts of India with daily flights from all major cities including Delhi, Mumbai, Kolkata, Bangalore, etc.

=== Health and sanitation ===
The Prayagraj Mela Committee set up 150,000 toilets and urinals in the Maha Kumbh area, and a monitoring system was launched to track sanitation levels in toilets. About 10,000 sanitation workers were engaged for cleaning activity. One cleaner was allocated for every ten toilets with a supervisor monitoring a batch of ten such personnel. The Uttar Pradesh State Government deputed 500 dedicated Ganga Praharis for cleaning the river during Maha Kumbh. During the Mahakumbh, the CPCB released a report stating that the water quality at the Maha Kumbh was found unfit for dips. However, after the conclusion of the Maha Kumbh, the CPCB published a new report stating that the water was fit for bathing, and that water quality varied significantly at different spots. The earlier report, it noted, did not accurately represent the overall water quality across the entire river stretch.

=== Safety and security ===
About 40,000 police officers from the Uttar Pradesh Police and surveillance systems were deployed for the event. Additionally, forces from the Uttar Pradesh Provincial Armed Constabulary (UP-PAC), National Disaster Response Force, and Central Armed Police Forces assisted in maintaining security. A network of around 2,300 cameras provided round-the-clock monitoring, enhancing surveillance across the Mela area. Underwater drones capable of diving up to 100 m (330 ft) were used in recovery operations. Maharashtra Police sent two teams to study the security arrangements and traffic management in the area during the Mahakumbh Mela, so they can use the same strategy with the Kumbh Mela in Nashik in 2027.

The state government allocated ₹1.31 billion (US$14 million) for the fire department. The Uttar Pradesh Fire and Emergency Services Department deployed 351 firefighting vehicles and 2000+ personnel across 50+ fire stations and 20 fire posts. It also deployed four articulating water towers to enhance fire fighting capabilities. These towers can extend 30 m (98 ft) horizontally, and 35 m (115 ft) vertically, and are designed to handle large fire events. Video recorders and thermal imaging cameras were deployed for real-time monitoring and precise firefighting.

The organising committee set up ten lost and found centres across various sectors to reunite missing individuals with their families. These centres use digital registration to keep track of people, with details on missing individuals displayed at all centres. Regular audio announcements, and messages across social media platforms were used to spread information on lost individuals. A mobile application was launched which provided information to the pilgrims. Artificial intelligence tools and chatbots were used to assist tourists and pilgrims.

== Amrit Snan ==
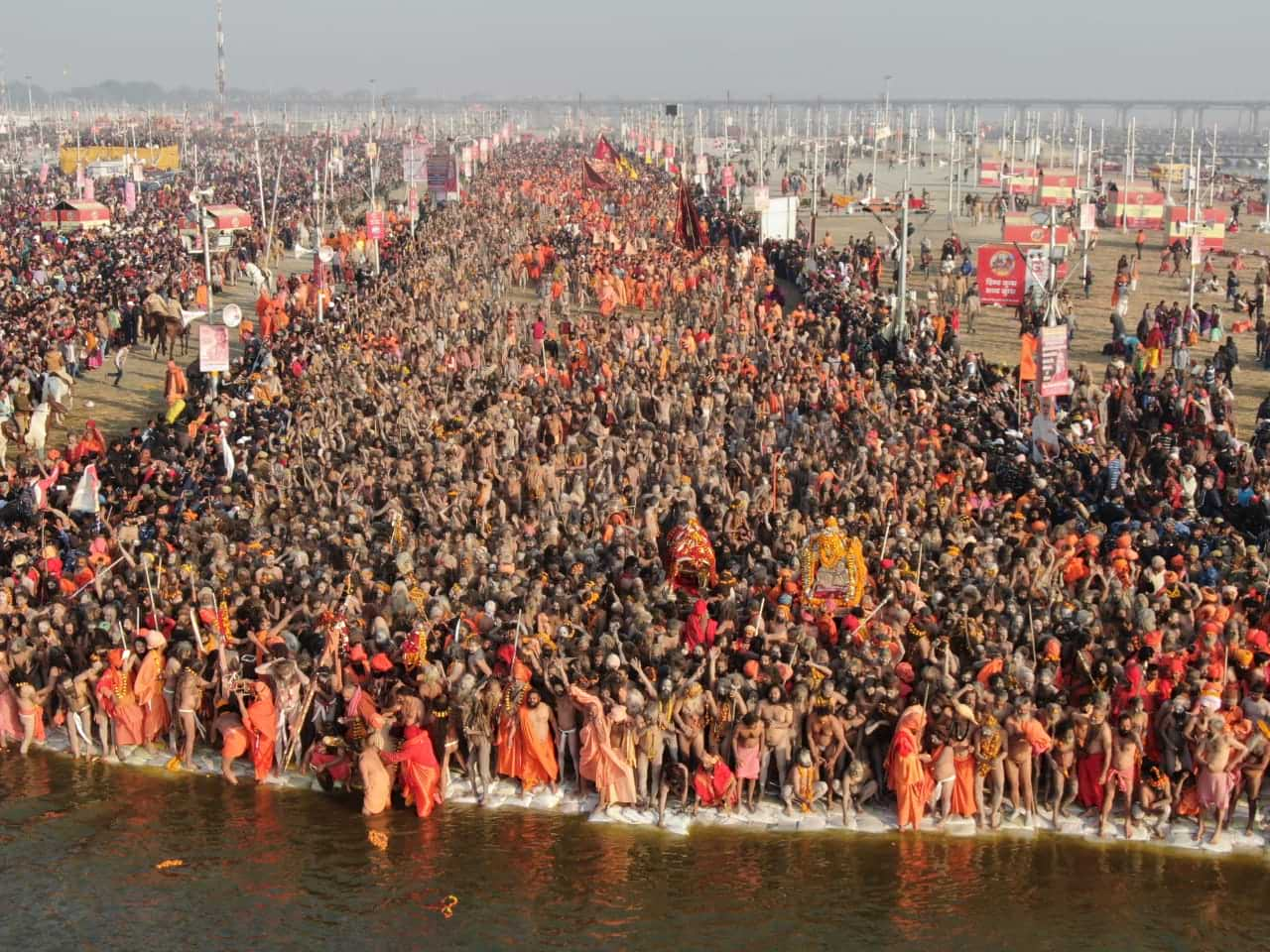
Amrit Snan at Kumbh Mela

Amrit Snan (transl. Nectar Baths) or Shahi Snan (transl. Royal Baths) are being held as follows:

Day	Date		Amrit Snan Occasions (engl.)	अमृत स्नान के पर्व (हिन्दी)	Description
Day	Gregorian	Panchanga	Amrit Snan Occasions (engl.)	अमृत स्नान के पर्व (हिन्दी)	Description
Monday	13 January 2025		Pausha Purnima	पौष पूर्णिमा	Official start of the Maha Kumbh Mela; significant bathing day
Tuesday	14 January 2025		Makara Sankranti	मकर संक्रांति	First Amrit Snan (royal bath), a major highlight of the festival
Wednesday	29 January 2025		Mauni Amavasya	मौनी अमावस्या	Second Amrit Snan; believed to be highly auspicious for cleansing sins
Monday	3 February 2025		Vasant Panchami	वसंत पंचमी	Third Amrit Snan; marks the arrival of spring and is significant for devotees
Wednesday	12 February 2025		Magha Purnima	माघ पूर्णिमा	Important bathing day; an opportunity for spiritual renewal
Wednesday	26 February 2025		Maha Shivaratri	महा शिवरात्रि	Concludes the Maha Kumbh Mela; another important bathing day

== Cultural programmes ==
The festival featured live performances by noted musicians including Shankar Mahadevan, Mohit Chauhan, and Kailash Kher. Exhibitions such as "One District, One Product" showcased local craftsmanship, while Kalagram served as a living museum of Indian arts and cuisine. Drone shows recreating scenes from the Prayag Mahatmyam and the Samudra Manthan were also presented to visitors.

== Incidents ==
- On 19 January a fire caused by an exploding gas cylinder destroyed at least 18 temporary tents at the festival grounds. No injuries were reported.
- On 15 February an SUV carrying pilgrims from Chhattisgarh heading to the festival collided with a bus in Prayagraj, killing all ten people aboard the SUV.
- On 22 February, an SUV carrying pilgrims from West Bengal crashed into a truck near Dhanbad while traveling to the festival, killing six people and injuring two others.
- On 24 February, 6 pilgrims were killed and 2 injured after a minibus they were taking from Gokak turned upside down.

=== Crowd crush ===
On 29 January 2025, a crowd crush at the festival grounds left at least 30 people dead and 60 others injured. A second crush in the following hours killed seven people including a three-year-old child. A report based on hospital and police records claimed the death toll was at least 79, and opposition parties said there were still 1,500 missing people as of 5 February. These discrepancies led to criticism of the government's handling of the incident and calls for greater transparency. Later on 15 February, a crowd crush at New Delhi railway station left 15 people dead after trains carrying pilgrims to the festival were delayed.

== Attendance ==
The 2025 Maha Kumbh Mela made preparations for the attendance of up to 40 crore (400 million) visitors. Some reports claimed this figure was exceeded. As of 12 February 2025, the Maha Kumbh Mela in Prayagraj has seen an unprecedented number of devotees participating in the sacred bathing rituals. By 6 AM on 12 February, over 73 lakh (7.3 million) devotees had taken the ritual dip at the Triveni Sangam and other ghats during the Maghi Purnima Snan.

According to the Economist, the attendance figures "implausibly imply that half of all Indians made the pilgrimage". The Times of India estimated that on an average day, there were 50-60 lakh (5-6 million) devotees staying at Kumbh Mela plus 10-15 lakh (1.0-1.5 million) temporary visitors, for a total of 65-70 lakh (6.5-7.0 million) per day. Attendance numbers were computed from a mix of manual counts, train arrivals, satellite imagery and camera footage.

Many tourists and pilgrims came from various countries such as Australia, Bhutan, Brazil, Bulgaria, Canada, China, Fiji, Finland, France, Germany, Greece, Guyana, Indonesia, Israel, Italy, Japan, Malaysia, Mauritius, Mexico, Mongolia, Nepal, Netherlands, Pakistan, Russia, Singapore, South Africa, Spain, Sri Lanka, Taiwan, Thailand, Trinidad and Tobago, Ukraine, United Arab Emirates, United Kingdom and United States.

A delegation of 118 diplomats, including the Heads of Mission, their spouses, and diplomats from 77 countries, visited the Maha Kumbh Mela on 1 February 2025.

=== Arrival of President Droupadi Murmu ===
President Droupadi Murmu on 10 February visited the Maha Kumbh Mela in Prayagraj and took a holy dip at the Triveni Sangam. After taking the dip, she offered prayers at Triveni Sangam—which is a confluence of the Ganges, Yamuna and Saraswati.

=== Arrival of Vice President Jagdeep Dhankhar ===
On 3 February 2025, Vice President of India Jagdeep Dhankhar along with his wife Sudesh Dhankhar, took a sacred dip at the Prayagraj Sangam during Maha Kumbh 2025.

=== Arrival of Prime Minister Narendra Modi ===
On 5 February 2025, Prime Minister Narendra Modi arrived at Prayagraj to participate in the ongoing Kumbh Mela. As part of the sacred rituals, he took a dip in the Triveni Sangam. His visit was marked by grand ceremonial events and prayers, and a boat ride to the Sangam with Uttar Pradesh Chief Minister Yogi Adityanath. The visit was widely covered by media outlets.

=== Arrival of King of Bhutan ===
On 4 February 2025, Bhutan's King Jigme Khesar Namgyel Wangchuck visited the Maha Kumbh and took a holy dip at the Triveni Sangam.

=== Celebrities and public figures ===
Several prominent business figures and celebrities visited the Maha Kumbh Mela. Industrialists Mukesh Ambani and Gautam Adani were among the notable attendees. British musician Chris Martin, lead singer of Coldplay, also visited the festival.

=== Notable people ===
==== Spiritual leaders ====
Various Akharas such as Digambar Akhara, Juna Akhara, Agni Akhara, Avahan Akhara, Kinnar Akhara, Mahanirvani Akhara, Atal Akhara, Niranjani Akhara, Nirmohi Akhara, and Udasi Akhara were part of the Kumbh Mela. Spiritual leaders who were part of the festivities include:

- Dhirendra Krishna Shastri, Peethadhish of the Bageshwar Dham Sarkar
- Swami Avdheshanand Giri, Acharya Mahamandaleshwar of Juna Akhara
- Swami Nischalananda Saraswati, 145th Shankaracharya of the Purvamnaya Sri Govardhana Peetham, Puri
- Swami Ramabhadracharya, founder of Tulsi Peeth and an incumbent Jagdguru Ramanandacharya
- Swami Ramdev, yoga guru
- Sri Sri Ravi Shankar, founder of the Art of Living Foundation.

==== Chief Ministers ====
- Yogi Adityanath, Chief Minister of Uttar Pradesh with his cabinet
- Prem Singh Tamang, Chief Minister of Sikkim
- N. Biren Singh, Chief Minister of Manipur
- Manik Saha, Chief Minister of Tripura
- Mohan Yadav, Chief Minister of Madhya Pradesh
- Bhupendrabhai Patel, Chief Minister of Gujarat.
- Himanta Biswa Sarma, Chief Minister of Assam
- Pushkar Singh Dhami, Chief Minister of Uttarakhand
- Vishnu Deo Sai, Chief Minister of Chhattisgarh
- Bhajan Lal Sharma, Chief Minister of Rajasthan
- Devendra Fadnavis, Chief Minister of Maharashtra
- D. K. Shivakumar, Deputy Chief Minister of Karnataka
- Brajesh Pathak, Deputy Chief Minister of Uttar Pradesh
- Akhilesh Yadav, former Chief Minister of Uttar Pradesh
- Pramod Sawant, Chief Minister of Goa
- Arjun Munda, former Chief Minister of Jharkhand
- Pawan Kalyan, Deputy CM of Andhra Pradesh.
- Sukhvinder Singh Sukhu, Chief Minister of Himachal Pradesh
- Eknath Shinde, Deputy Chief Minister of Maharashtra
- Mohan Charan Majhi, Chief Minister of Odisha

==== Union Ministers ====
- Amit Shah, Minister of Home Affairs
- Rajnath Singh, Minister of Defence
- Kiren Rijiju, Minister for Minority Affairs
- Piyush Goyal, Minister of Commerce and Industry
- Nitin Gadkari, Minister of Road Transport & Highways
- Dharmendra Pradhan, Union Minister of Education
- Chirag Paswan, Minister of Food Processing Industries
- Pralhad Joshi, Minister of Consumer Affairs, Food and Public Distribution and Minister of New and Renewable Energy
- J. P. Nadda, Minister of Health
- Jitan Ram Manjhi, Minister of Micro, Small and Medium Enterprises

==== Others ====
- Suvendu Adhikari, LoP, West Bengal Legislative Assembly
- Nara Lokesh, state minister, Andhra Pradesh
- Sachin Pilot, General Secretary of INC for Chattishgarh, Member of Legislative Assembly from Tonk and former Deputy Chief Minister of Rajasthan
- Vijay Kumar Sinha, Deputy Chief Minister of Bihar
- Dattatreya Hosabale, General Secretary of the Rashtriya Swayamsevak Sangh
- Anurag Thakur, Member of Parliament from Hamirpur
- Harivansh Narayan Singh, Deputy Chairperson of the Rajya Sabha
- Arun Govil, Member of Parliament from Meerut
- Hema Malini, Member of Parliament from Mathura
- Ravi Kishan, Member of Parliament from Gorakhpur
- Dilip Ghosh, Former Member of Parliament from Medinipur and former national vice President of BJP
- Jyotiraditya Scindia, Member of Parliament from Guna
- Nupur Sharma, ex-BJP spokesperson
- Navneet Kaur Rana, Former Member of Parliament from Amravati
- Rachna Banerjee, Indian actress, Trinamool Congress leader and Member of Parliament from Hooghly
- Raghavendra Kumar Singh, INC leader and Member of Legislative Assembly from Akaltara
- Om Birla, Lok Sabha Speaker & Member of Parliament from Kota
- Manoj Tiwari, Member of Parliament from North East Delhi
- Arif Mohammad Khan, Governor of Bihar
- Raghuraj pratap singh, Member of legislative assembly uttar pradesh from Kunda
- Dhananjay Singh
- T. Raja Singh MLA Telangana Legislative Assembly
- Venkaiah Naidu, Former Vice president of India
- K. Laxman, Former MLA
- Tejasvi Surya, Member of Parliament from Bangalore South and President of BJYM
- Sambit Patra, Member of Parliament from Puri
- Gurmit Singh (general), Governor of Uttarakhand
- R. N. Ravi, Governor of Tamil Nadu
- Kambhampati Hari Babu, Governor of Odisha
- Gyanesh Kumar, Chief Election Commissioner of India
- Premchand Aggarwal, Member of Legislative Assembly from Rishikesh
- Annamalai Kuppusamy, State president of the Bharatiya Janata Party in Tamil Nadu.
- Sajeev Kandoth, Karayogam President, Rabigh

==== International Government and Politics ====
- Erik Solheim, Former Norwegian Minister for Climate and Environment,

==== Film and media ====
- Adah Sharma, Hindi and Telugu actress
- Anupam Kher, Bollywood actor and producer
- Akshay Kumar, Bollywood actor.
- Avinash Tiwary, Indian actor
- Bhagyashree, Indian Bollywood actress
- Chris Martin, British singer and co-founder of the rock band Coldplay
- Dakota Johnson, American actress and daughter of Don Johnson and Melanie Griffith
- Esha Gupta, Indian actress and model
- Guru Randhawa, singer, songwriter and music composer
- Himansh Kohli, Indian Bollywood actor
- Juhi Chawla, Indian actress.
- Katrina Kaif, India-based British actress
- Kabir Khan, director, screenwriter and cinematographer of Bollywood
- Kubbra Sait, Indian actress
- Mamta Kulkarni, former Bollywood actress
- Milind Soman, Indian Bollywood actor
- Neena Gupta, Indian Bollywood actress
- Nas Daily (Nuseir Yassin), Israeli-Palestinian vlogger
- Pankaj Tripathi, Indian Bollywood actor.
- Neeti Mohan, Indian singer
- Poonam Pandey, Indian model and actress
- Preity Zinta, Indian actress
- Raj Arjun, Indian Actor
- Sara Arjun, Indian actress
- Remo D'Souza, choreographer, film director, and producer
- Rajkummar Rao, Indian Bollywood actor
- Roshni Walia, Indian actress
- Sanjay Mishra, Indian Bollywood actor
- Sonal Chauhan, Indian actress
- Sourabh Raaj Jain, Indian Bollywood actor
- Shankar Mahadevan, singer and composer
- Shivangi Joshi, lead actress at Yeh Rishta Kya Kehlata Hai
- Shreema Bhattacherjee, Bengali actress
- Siddharth Nigam, Indian actor from Prayagraj
- Srinidhi Shetty, Indian kannada actress
- Sunil Grover, actor and comedian, part of The Kapil Sharma Show
- Sunil Shetty, Indian Actor.
- Tina Ambani, former actress and wife of Anil Ambani
- Vicky Kaushal, Indian actor.
- Tanisha Mukherjee, Indian actress
- Vidyut Jammwal, Indian actor
- Vijay Deverakonda, Indian actor
- Vivek Oberoi, Indian actor.
- Sivamani, Indian percussionist.
- Puneet Issar, Indian actor, writer, director, producer and dialect coach.
- Rupali Ganguly, Indian actress.
- Malina Joshi, Nepali actress and Miss Nepal 2011
- Malini Awasthi, Indian folk singer.
- Shaan, Indian playback singer.
- Tejendra Majumdar, Indian sarod player
- Tanmoy Bose, Indian tabla player and composer
- Tamannaah Bhatia, Indian actress
- Akhilesh Gundecha, Indian pakhawaj player
- KG Prasad, Carnatic and devotional singer, and percussionist
- Nimrat Kaur, Indian actress.
- Sanchita Basu, lead actress at Thukra Ke Mera Pyaar
- Raveena Tandon, Indian actress.
- Kailash Kher, Indian music composer and singer.
- Mohit Chauhan, Indian playback singer.
- Dalljiet Kaur, Indian actress
- Kanikka Kapur, Indian actress
- Aneri Vajani, Indian actress

==== Business ====
- Balkrishna, chairman of Patanjali Ayurved
- Anil Ambani, chairman and managing director of Reliance Group
- Akash Ambani, chairman of Reliance Jio
- Gautam Adani, founder and chairman of the Adani Group
- Isha M. Ambani, Member of the Board of Reliance Industries.
- Laurene Powell Jobs, founder and president of the Emerson Collective
- Mukesh Ambani, chairman and managing director of Reliance Industries.
- Nita Ambani, chairman, founder and managing director of Reliance Foundation
- Pieter Elbers, CEO of IndiGo
- Sudha Murty, founder and chairperson of Infosys Foundation

==== Sports ====
- The Great Khali, retired professional wrestler
- Mary Kom, former Olympic boxer
- Suresh Raina, former Indian cricketer
- Jay Shah, Chairman of the International Cricket Council
- R. P. Singh, former Indian cricketer
- Navdeep Singh, Indian para-athletics
- Saina Nehwal, Indian badminton player
- Anil Kumble, former Indian cricketer.
- Sunil Gavaskar, former Indian cricketer
- Sandeep Lamichhane, Nepali international cricketer
- Mayank Agarwal, Indian cricketer
- Ishant Sharma, Indian cricketer

== See also ==
- Prayag Kumbh Mela
