= 2011 Sabarimala crowd crush =

Crowd crush in India

- Date: 14 January 2011
- Location: Pullumedu, Sabarimala, Kerala, India; 9°27′48″N 77°05′37″E
- Deaths: 106
- Injuries: 456

The 2011 Sabarimala crowd crush (often incorrectly described as a human stampede) took place on 14 January 2011, Makara Jyothi Day at Pullumedu near Sabarimala in Kerala, India. It broke out during an annual pilgrimage, killing 106 pilgrims and injuring about 100 more declared later as "National disaster". The pilgrims were returning from a Hindu shrine on the last day of a yearly festival which attracts millions of devotees. It began after a Jeep toppled over.

== Background ==
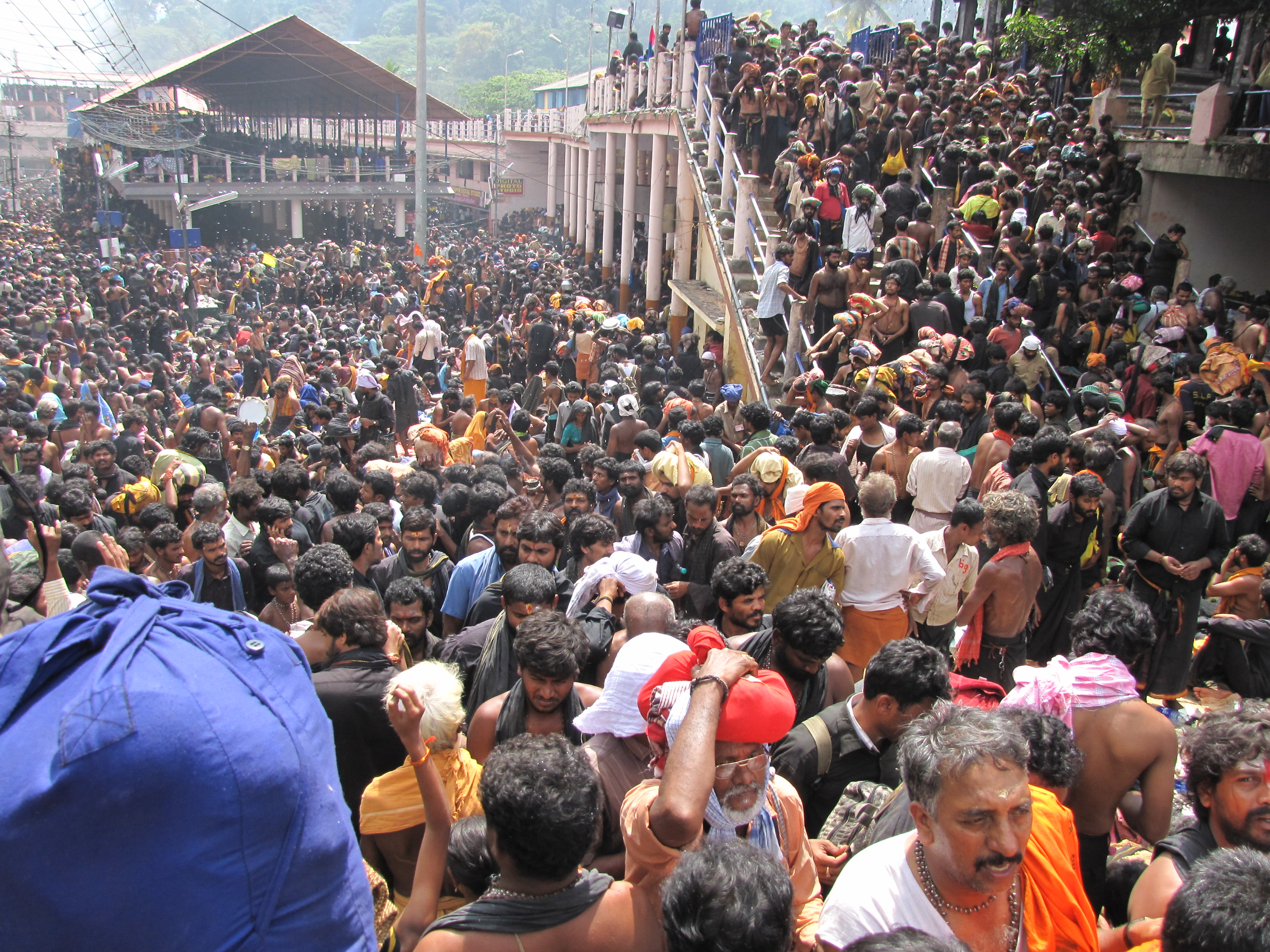
Pilgrims gathering in Sabarimala for the Makarajyothi in 2010

Makara Jyothi is a star which is worshiped by pilgrims in huge numbers at Sabarimala Temple in Kerala on Makara Sankranti on 14 January every year. It is believed that the deity Ayyappan asserts himself as Makara Jyothi to bless his devotees.

The crowd crush is the worst recorded accident to have occurred in Sabarimala. In the past on 14 January 1952, 66 Ayyappa pilgrims were burnt to death when two fireworks sheds caught fire, while on the same day in 1999, 52 pilgrims were killed following a crowd crush during their return after witnessing the Makara Jyothi at Pamba.

The two-month-long pilgrimage, which had started in November 2010, had been mostly incident-free before this crowd crush.

== The incident ==
The incident happened around 8 p.m. local time. Most of the dead were from the states of Andhra Pradesh, Karnataka, Tamil Nadu and Kerala. There are various versions of the accident as reported in various newspapers and television reports. The victims were going back home through the forest after Makara Jyothi darshanam, thought to be a celestial phenomenon on the hill shrine of the Hindu god Ayyappan. The crowd crush was reportedly caused by an SUV which blocked the path, near Pullumedu, possibly after breaking down. When moved it may have overturned and caused people to stumble, triggering the stampede or by too many people running down the hill towards the road where there was already a pack of vehicles. There is a version of an accident between an autorickshaw and a Jeep. The real trigger of the incident remains a mystery given the fact that the spot where the stampede occurred is an open field.

== Relief efforts ==
Kerala Chief Minister V. S. Achuthanandan announced a judicial inquiry into the stampede tragedy and also announced a grant of ₹5,00,000 for families of each of the victims. Prime minister of India Manmohan Singh offered condolences for the deaths and announced a compensation of ₹1,00,000 to the next of kin of the dead and ₹50,000 for those injured. A team of National Disaster Response Force (NDRF) was sent to the scene. Tamil Nadu Chief Minister M. Karunanidhi announced ₹1,00,000 to the family of each victim from Tamil Nadu.

== See also ==
- 1999 Sabarimala stampede
- Nalpathiyonnu (41) movie released on 2019 Directed by Lal Jose; the climax of the movie depicts this tragedy.
