= 1999 Sabarimala stampede =

Crowd crush in India

- Date: 14 January 1999
- Location: Sabarimala, Kerala, India
- Type: crowd crush
- Deaths: 53
- Injuries: unknown

The Sabarimala stampede was a human crowd crush that occurred at Sabarimala Temple in the Indian state of Kerala on the 14 January, 1999. 53 of the pilgrims who had come to see Makara Jyothi died, the majority of them from outside Kerala. The crush outside Pamba base camp was caused by the collapse of the sides of a hillock. Some pilgrims were killed in the collapse, but most died in the ensuing stampede.

== Justice Chandrasekhara Menon Committee ==
A judicial commission, headed by Justice Chandrasekhara Menon, was constituted to investigate the tragedy. Justice Menon's report found the State Government guilty of "negligence in ensuring the safety of the pilgrims coming from different parts of the country." Amongst other recommendations, the report pointed out the need to provide basic amenities on the Pullumedu route, through which a large number of pilgrims from Tamil Nadu travel. Since over 60% of devotees coming to Sabarimala during the pilgrimage season are from other states, the route is especially popular since it provides them easy access to temple towns like Madurai on their return journey. Most of the committee's proposals were not enacted and huge public outcry broke out after the 2011 Sabarimala crowd crush.

== See also ==
- 2011 Sabarimala crowd crush
