= 2013 Prayag Kumbh Mela stampede =

Deadly human stampede in Uttar Pradesh, India

Kumbh Mela stampede Allahabad 2013
- Date: 10 February 2013
- Location: Allahabad, Uttar Pradesh, India
- Deaths: 42
- Injuries: 45

On 10 February 2013, during the Hindu festival of Kumbh Mela, a stampede broke out at the train station in Allahabad, Uttar Pradesh, India, killing 42 people and injuring at least 45 people.

== Background ==
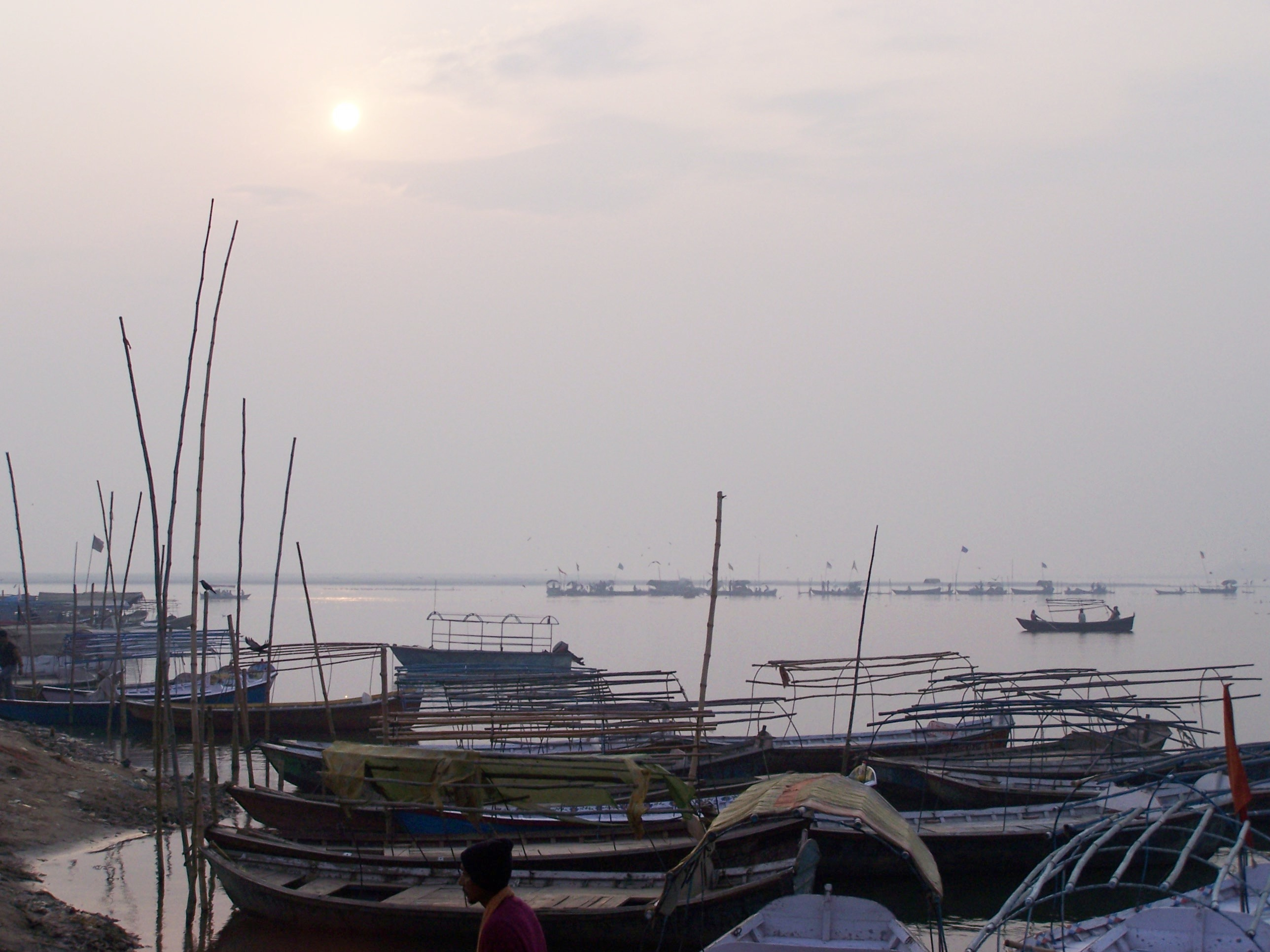
The Triveni Sangam, or the intersection of Yamuna River and Ganges River and the mythical Saraswati River, where devotees perform rituals, and the site of the great baths during Kumbh Mela

Kumbh Mela is a major Hindu religious festival that is celebrated every three years in four rotating places. The 2013 event was considered a Maha Kumbh Mela, which comes around only once every 12 years. It lasted 55 days and was expected to be attended by 100 million pilgrims, making it the largest temporary gathering of people in the world at that time. A temporary city covering an area larger than Athens was set up to accommodate the crowds. Sunday, 10 February was considered the most auspicious day, and 30 million people descended to Allahabad to bathe at the confluence of the Yamuna and the Ganges rivers.

== The stampede ==
According to initial reports, the stampede broke out after a railing on a footbridge collapsed at the Allahabad railway station. Eyewitnesses, however, said that the stampede was triggered after the railway police charged at the crowd with wooden sticks in order to control the huge rush at the station. 42 people were killed by the crush of people, including 29 women, 12 men, and an eight-year-old girl who died after waiting almost two hours for help. At least 45 people were injured in addition.

In an unrelated event earlier that day, two people were killed in another stampede.

== Reaction ==
Prime Minister Manmohan Singh expressed condolences and offered compensation to the affected people. Uttar Pradesh chief minister Akhilesh Yadav constituted a committee to probe the stampede. Uttar Pradesh's Panchayati Raj minister, Balram Yadav said that the inquiry would be launched and completed within a month.

On 11 February 2013, Samajwadi Party leader Azam Khan, who was in charge of the Kumbh Mela, took responsibility for the stampede and resigned. Praising the minister for his sincere work, Uttar Pradesh Chief Minister, rejected Khan's resignation.

== Other stampedes ==
Due to the huge number of attendees stampedes are relatively common during Kumbh Mela festivals. The 1954 Kumbh Mela stampede was the deadliest since India's independence, with an estimated 1,000 deaths. The 2003 Kumbh Mela stampede killed 39 people in the city of Nashik, and seven were killed during the 2010 Kumbh Mela in Haridwar.
