= List of neighbourhoods in Mecca =

This is a list of neighbourhoods in the city and province of Mecca in western Saudi Arabia.

== List ==
- Al Faisaliyyah
- Ajyad
- Al Adl
- Al Buhayrat, which is located near At-Tanʽim
- Al Ghassalah
- Al Hindawiyyah — commercial center south of the Al Haram District.
- Al Iskan — includes the King Fahd Housing complex, A residential district.
- Al Jumaizah
- Al Maabda
- Al Muaisem
- Al Nuzha
- Al Rasaifah
- Al Shoqiyah
- Al Shubaikah
- Al Sulaimaniyyah
- At-Tan'im, which contains Masjid ʿAʾishah, which is used as a miqat for people living in Makkah, who want to perform the pilgrimages of Ḥajj and ʿUmrah
- Al Tundobawi
- Al Utaibiyyah
- Al Zahir
- Al Zahra
- Al-Khalidiya
- Aziziyah
- Gazza
- Jabal Al Nour
- Jabal Omar
- Jarwal (Mecca neighborhood)
- Jurhum (Mecca neighborhood)
- Mina — incorporates the tents, the Jamarat area, and the slaughterhouses just outside the tent city.
- Misfalah
- Muzdalifah
- Shar Mansur

== See also ==
- Ḥaram
- Holiest sites in Islam
- Middle East
  - Arabia
