= Miqat Dhu al-Hulayfah =

One of several Miqats for Muslims on pilgrimage to Mecca for umrah or hajj

- Arabic: ميقات ذو الحليفة
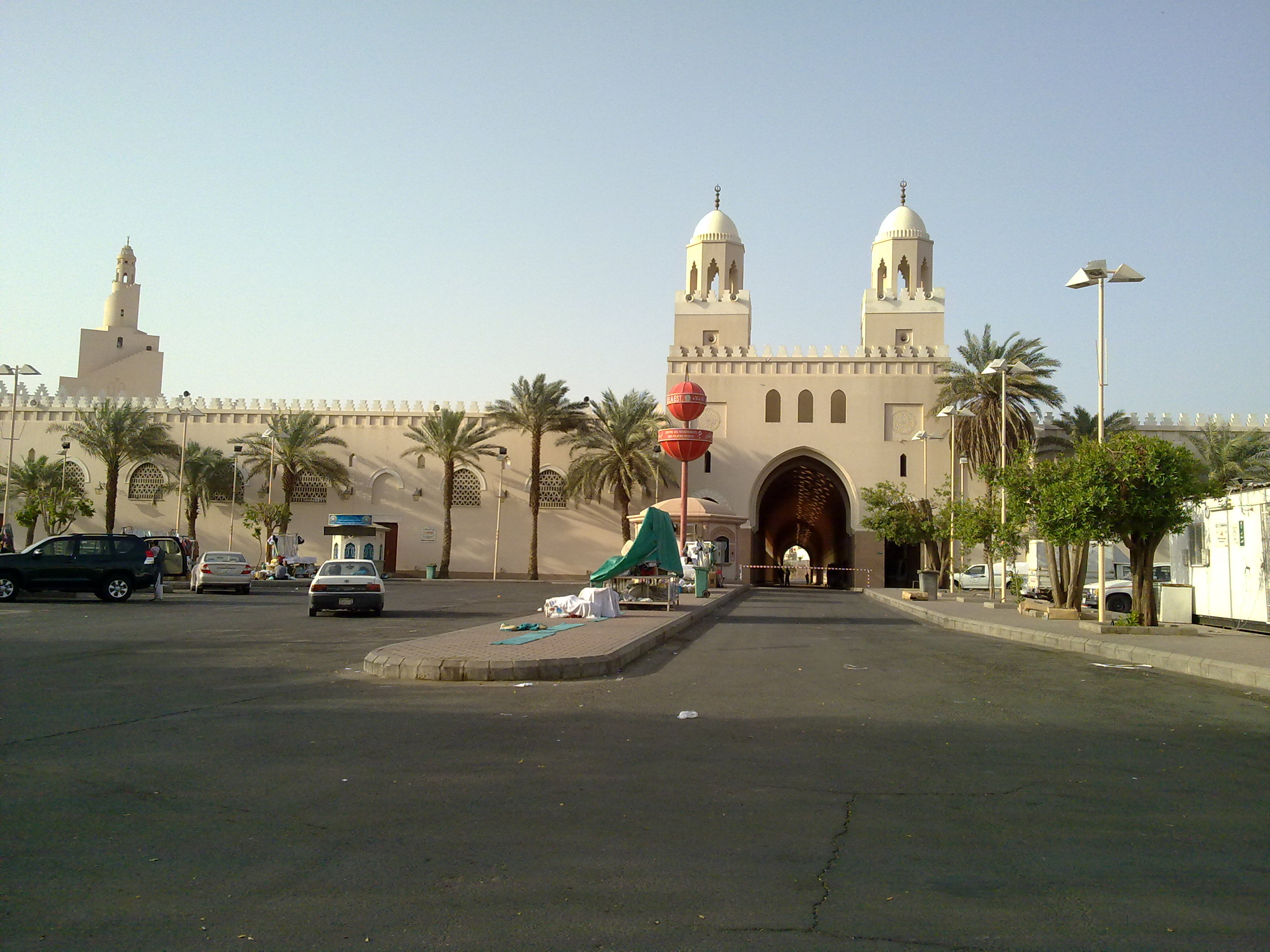
- Masjid ash-Shajarah in 2011

- Location of the miqat mosque in Saudi Arabia

Religion
- Affiliation: Islam
- Branch/tradition: Ihram
- Ecclesiastical or organisational status: Miqat Mosque
- Status: Active

Location
- Location: Abyar 'Ali, Medina, Madinah Province
- Country: Saudi Arabia
- Coordinates: 24°24′49″N 39°32′33″E

Architecture
- Architect: Abdel-Wahed El-Wakil

Specifications
- Capacity: 5,000 worshippers
- Length: 190 m (620 ft)
- Width: 190 m (620 ft)
- Interior area: 6,400 m^{2} (69,000 sq ft)
- Dome: 13
- Minaret: 5
- Minaret height: 64 m (210 ft) (tallest)
- Site area: 37,000 m^{2} (400,000 sq ft)
- Elevation: 180 m (591 ft)

The Mīqāt Dhu al-Ḥulayfah (Arabic: مِيْقَات ذُو ٱلْحُلَيْفَة, lit. 'Mosque of the Tree'), also known as Masjid Dhu al-Hulayfah (Arabic: مَسْجِد ذُو ٱلْحُلَيْفَة), is a miqat and mosque in Abyār ʿAlī, Medina, Saudi Arabia. The miqat mosque is located west of Wadi al-'Aqiq, where the final Islamic prophet, Muhammad, entered the state of ihram before performing 'Umrah, after the Treaty of Hudaybiyyah. The mosque is located 7 km (4.3 miles) SW of the Al-Masjid an-Nabawi and was defined by Muhammad as the miqat for those willing to perform the Hajj or Umrah pilgrimages from Medina.It is the second-largest miqat mosque after the Miqat Qarn al-Manazil in As-Sayl al-Kabir.

== History ==
The mosque was first built during the time of Umar II ibn 'Abdulaziz, who was the Umayyad governor of Medina from 87 AH (705/706 CE) to 93 AH (711/712 CE), and has been renovated several times since, the last major renovation being under King Fahd (r. 1982–2005), who increased the area of the mosque by many times its original size and added several modern facilities.

== Architecture ==
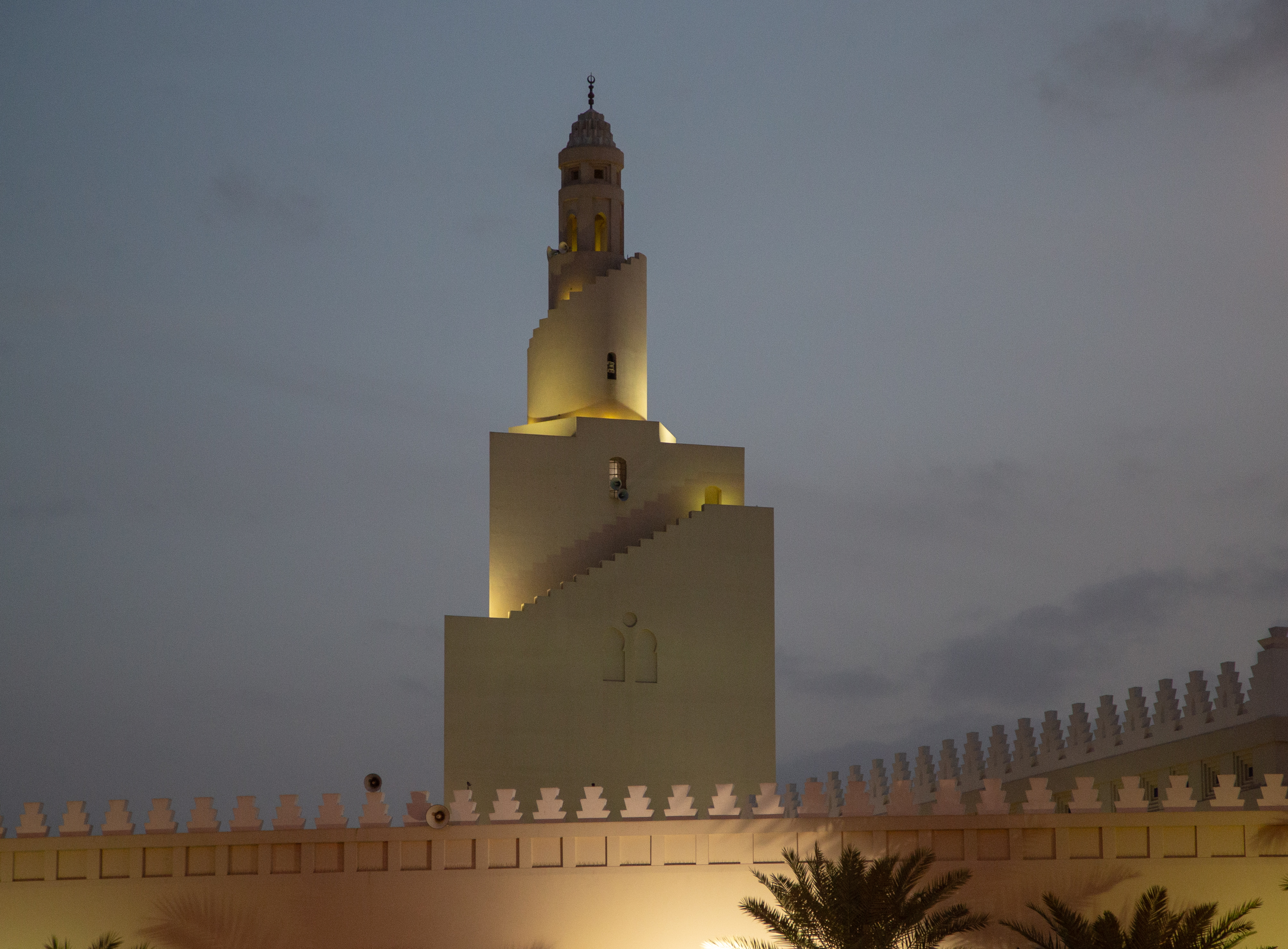
This minaret of Dhu al-Hulayfah is distinct from the others both architecturally and in the fact that it is more than twice as tall as the others.

The current mosque building was built during the reign of King Fahd. It is in the shape of a square of an area of approximately 6,000 m^{2} (65,000 sq ft) inside a 36,000 m^{2} (390,000 sq ft) square-shaped enclosure. It consists of two sets of galleries separated by a wide yard of approximately 1,000 m^{2} (11,000 sq ft). The galleries are shaped as arches ending with long domes. At the center of the mosque is spring of water housed inside a dome. The portion of the enclosure that does not include the mosque, measuring around 20,000 m^{2} (220,000 sq ft), includes multiple restrooms and areas for changing into ihram and performing wudu. Most of the inner area is pathways, galleries and trees. All 13 domes are located on the roof of the mosque, while the five minarets are located around the enclosure. One of the mosque's minarets stands distinct from the others, square at the bottom but round at the top in a diagonal shape, rising to a height of 64 metres (210 ft).

== See also ==
- Islam in Saudi Arabia
- List of mosques in Saudi Arabia
- Bayda (land)
