= At-Tanʽim =

At-Tanʽīm Arabic: ٱلتَّنْعِيْم
- Neighbourhood
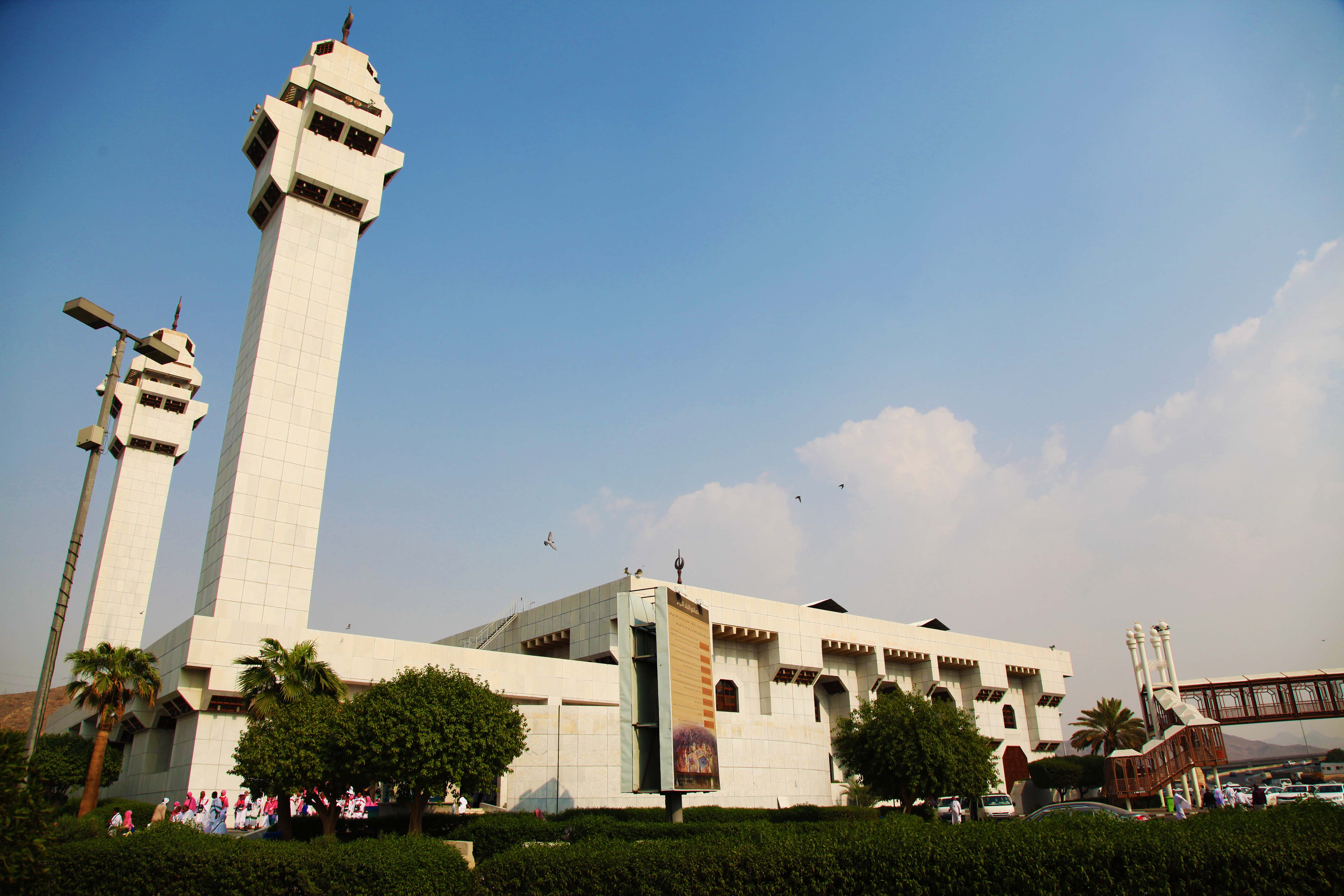
- Masjid A'ishah in At-Tan'im

- Location in Saudi Arabia At-Tanʽīm (West and Central Asia)
- Coordinates: 21°28′57″N 39°48′18″E
- Country: Saudi Arabia
- Province: Makkah Region
- City: Makkah
- Time zone: UTC+3 (EAT)
  - Summer (DST): UTC+3 (EAT)

At-Tanʿīm (Arabic: ٱلتَّنْعِيْم) is a neighbourhood of Makkah in western Saudi Arabia. In this district is Masjid A'ishah, a boundary of the Ḥaram, where pilgrims of Ḥajj and ʿUmrah can put on Iḥram.

== See also ==
- List of cities and towns in Saudi Arabia
- Regions of Saudi Arabia
