= Masjid at-Taneem =

Mosque in Saudi Arabia

Aisha Mosque
- Masjid ʾat-Tanʿīm (مَسْجِد ٱلتَّنْعِيْم); Masjid ʿĀʾishah (مَسْجِد عَائِشَة)
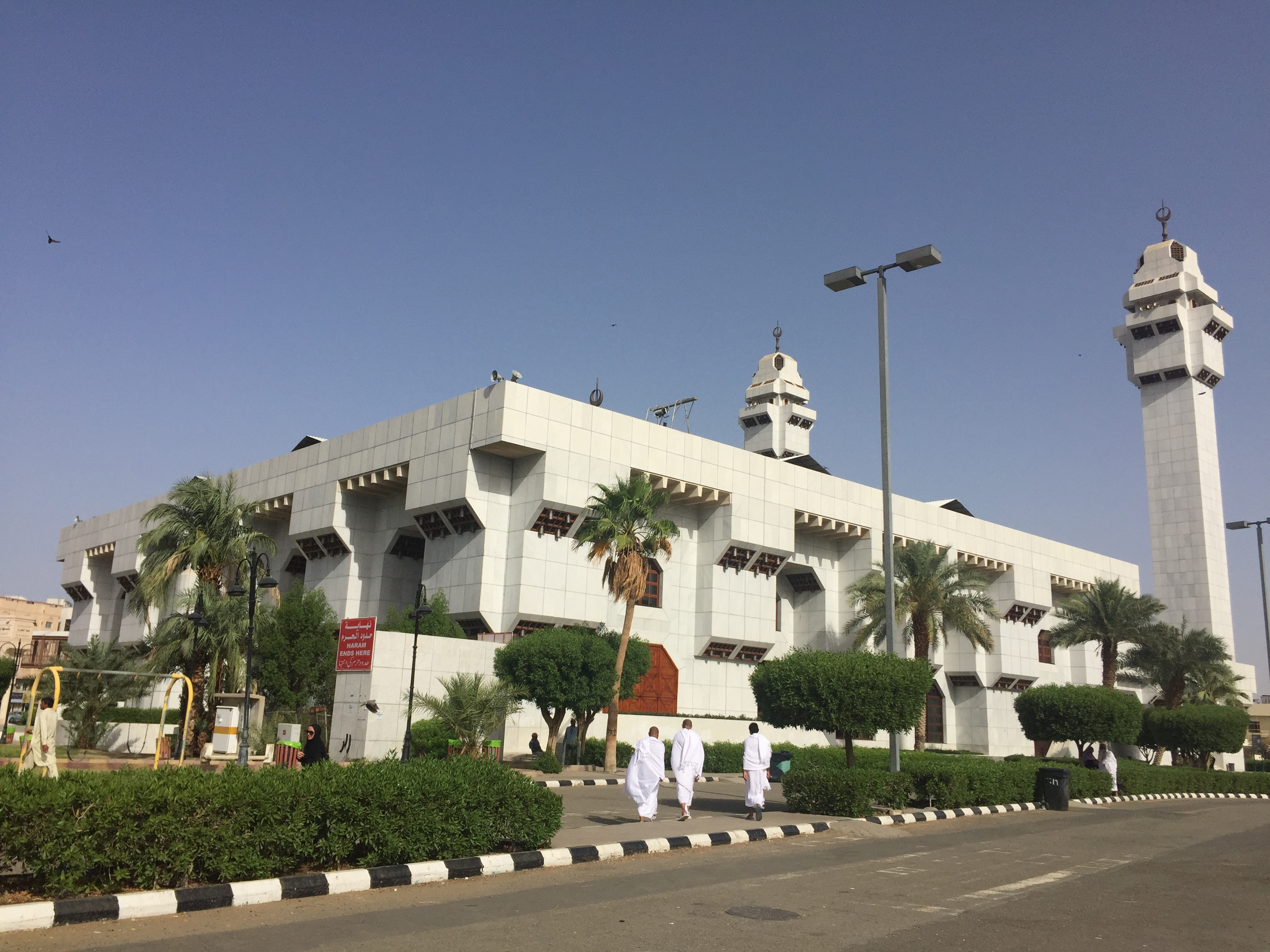

- Location within Saudi Arabia

Religion
- Affiliation: Islam
- Branch/tradition: Hajj / Umrah
- Ecclesiastical or organizational status: Mosque
- Status: Active

Location
- Location: At-Tanʽim, Makkah, Hejaz
- Country: Saudi Arabia
- Interactive map of Aisha Mosque
- Coordinates: 21°28′04″N 39°48′05″E

Architecture
- Type: Mosque architecture

The Masjid at-Taneem (Arabic: مَسْجِد ٱلتَّنْعِيْم, romanized: Masjid ʾat-Tanʿīm) is a historic mosque in the area of Al-Hil, approximately 8.0 kilometres (5 miles) from the Kaaba, in the neighbourhood of At-Tan'im in Mecca, Saudi Arabia.

== Overview ==
It is a boundary of the Ḥaram, therefore pilgrims of Ḥajj and ʿUmrah can put on Iḥram. This mosque is also known as Masjid Aisha (Arabic: مَسْجِد عَائِشَة, romanized: Masjid ʿĀʾishah), since Aisha bint Abu Bakr, wife of the Islamic prophet Muhammad, had put on her Ihram from this place once.

This was allowed by the prophet as a special case when Aisha could not complete her umra on account of being in an impure state due to menstrual period. Aisha's brother who accompanied her to Taneem and back did not perform another umra along with his sister, understanding that it was a special allowance made for Aisha or any woman who happens to become impure, due to her menstrual period. Nowadays It is the nearest and most convenient location to enter into Ihram for those residing within the boundaries of the Haram.

The Aisha Mosque covers an approx area of 6,000 sq, with facilities for baths, ablution and changing, available for pilgrims and those who come to offer regular prayers.

The mosque has two minarets.

== See also ==
- Islam in Saudi Arabia
- List of mosques in Saudi Arabia
