= Nigeria–Saudi Arabia relations =

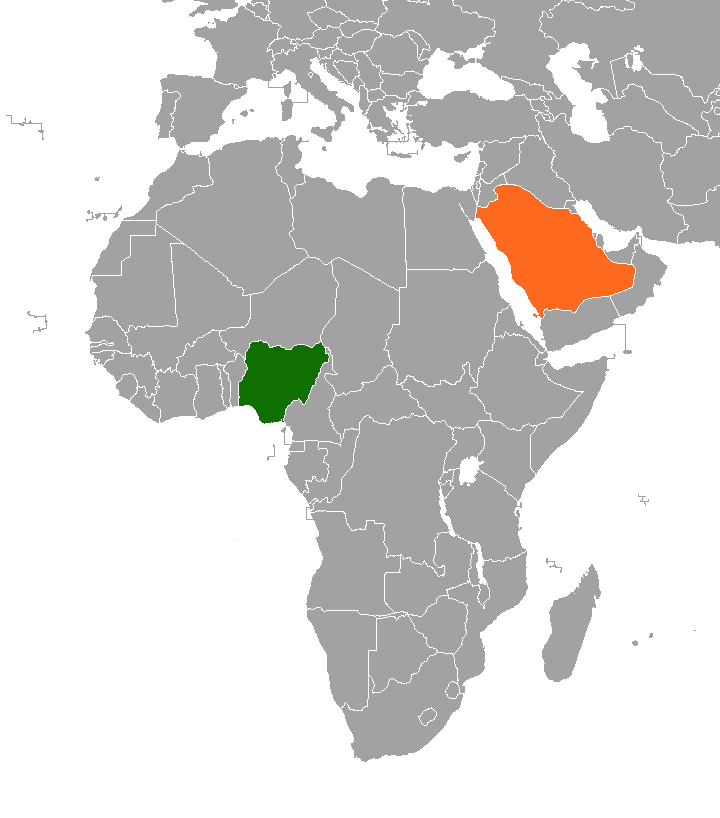

- Nigeria: Saudi Arabia

Nigeria–Saudi Arabia relations are the bilateral relations between Nigeria and Saudi Arabia. Nigeria has an embassy in Riyadh while Saudi Arabia has an embassy in Abuja. Both countries are member of OPEC.

== History ==
Relations between the two nations have existed since 1960.

In 2021, Nigerian Senate President Ahmad Lawan asked the Government of Saudi Arabia to bring back over 10,000 detained citizens held in detention centers in Saudi Arabia. Many were detained for breaking Saudi Arabia's ban on Nigerian pilgrims to Hajj. Lawan also appealed to Saudi Arabia to use its influence in OPEC to increase Nigeria's crude oil production quota.

Saudi Ambassador to Nigeria, Faisal Ebraheem Alghamdi, stated the Kingdom is ready to expand its bilateral relations with Nigeria in critical economic sectors such as Oil, Gas and Agriculture.

In 2021, Saudi Arabia banned Nigerian pilgrims from attending the 2021 Hajj due to COVID-19 concerns. Over 70,000 pilgrims from Nigeria were given refunds for their deposits. It was the second year in a row that the Saudi Arabia Ministry of Hajj and Umrah banned Nigerian pilgrims from attending.

== Trade ==
In 2019, Nigeria exported US$12.4 million worth of goods to Saudi Arabia. The biggest export was charcoal. Saudi Arabia in the same year exported US$334 Million of which the largest export was Polypropylene.

== Resident diplomatic missions ==
- Nigeria has an embassy in Riyadh and a consulate-general in Jeddah.
- Saudi Arabia has an embassy in Abuja.

== See also ==
- Foreign relations of Nigeria
- Foreign relations of Saudi Arabia
