= Hadith of Mut'ah and Imran ibn Husain =

Hadith about the prohibition of Mut'ah

A famous recorded oral tradition among Muslims (Arabic: Hadith) is about comment made by Imran ibn Husain, one of the companions of the Islamic prophet Muhammad and a Narrator of hadith. The comment was regarding the prohibition of Mut'ah, a word with several meanings. It is used in both Nikah mut'ah and Mut'ah of Hajj.

Although the narration is prominently quoted and referred to, it is not given any formal name, in contrast to other hadith such as the Hadith of the pond of Khumm or the Hadith of Qur'an and Sunnah

== Narration ==
A hadith in Sahih Bukhari state:

Narrated 'Imran: The Verse of Mut'ah was revealed in Allah's Book, so we performed it with Allah's Apostle, and nothing was revealed in Qur'an to make it illegal, nor did the Prophet prohibit it till he died. But the man (who regarded it illegal) just expressed what his own mind suggested.

— Sahih Bukhari

Another hadith under the topic of Hajj states:

حWe performed Mut'ah in the lifetime of Allah's Messenger and then the Qur'an was revealed (regarding Hajj-at-Tamattu`) and somebody said what he wished (regarding Hajj-at-Tamattu`) according his own opinion.

The hadith recorded from him in Sahih Muslim states:

'Imran b. Husain said there was revealed the verse of Tamattu' in Hajj in the Book of Allah and the Messenger of Allah commanded us to perform it. and then no verse was revealed abrogating the Tamattu' (form of Hajj), and the Messenger of God did not forbid to do it till he died. So whatever a person said was his personal opinion.

Another recorded by Sahih Muslim states:

Mutarrif reported: 'Imran b. Husain sent for me during his illness of which he died, and said: I am narrating to you some ahadith which may benefit you after me. If I live you conceal (the fact that these have been transmitted by me), and if I die, then you narrate them if you like (and these are): I am blessed, and bear in mind that the Messenger of Allah combined Hajj and Umra. Then no verse was revealed in regard to it in the Book of Allah (which abrogated it) and the Messenger of Allah did not forbid (from doing it). And whatever a person ('Umar) said was out of his personal opinion.

== Muslim view ==
Muslims view this hadith as notable since it can be seen as related to the Hadiths regarding the legality of Nikah Mut'ah, and is often mentioned when discussing those topics.

The comment of Imran ibn Husain is regarding the Hadith of Umar's speech of forbidding Mut'ah.

All Muslims agree that this hadith is authentic, and that Umar did indeed forbid Mut'ah. However, there is dispute on how to define "Mut'ah" and whether or not it was forbidden before Umar. The hadith tells about a "Verse of Mut'ah" revealed in the Qur'an. Muslims disagree which verse is alluded to, since two different verses can be seen as the Verse of Mut'ah.

- The first one is found in Sura An-Nisa, verse 24. We read:

And (also forbidden are) all married women except those whom your right hands possess (this is) Allah's ordinance to you, and lawful for you are (all women) besides those, provided that you seek (them) with your property, taking (them) in marriage not committing fornication. Then as to 'those whom you profit by (istamta´tum), give them their dowries as appointed; and there is no blame on you about what you mutually agree after what is appointed; surely Allah is Knowing, Wise.

— Quran 4:24

The word "istamta´tum" is notable, because the word used literally means "to benefit, to enjoy, to profit". Muslims differ on what is meant by Mut'ah here, and which judgement the verse gives about it. Generally, Shi'a Muslims tend to believe that Mut'ah here refers to the temporary marriage, and that this verse permits it. Among the Sunnis, different view exists:

1. Some sunnis do not believe that this verse refers to the Nikah Mut'ah at all. This view was favored by Suyuti.
2. Some agree that the verse refers to the temporary marriage, but disagree that the verse permits it. Ibn Kathir cited the hadith from Mujahid ibn Jabr to this effect.
- The second possibility is that "The Verse of Mut'ah" refers to Al-Baqarah, 196. We read:

And accomplish the pilgrimage and the visit for Allah, but if, you are prevented, (send) whatever offering is easy to obtain, and do not shave your heads until the offering reaches its destination; but whoever among you is sick or has an ailment of the head, he (should effect) a compensation by fasting or alms or sacrificing, then when you are secure, whoever profits (tamattu´) by combining the visit with the pilgrimage (should take) what offering is easy to obtain; but he who cannot find (any offering) should fast for three days during the pilgrimage and for seven days when you return; these (make) ten (days) complete; this is for him whose family is not present in the Sacred Mosque, and be careful (of your duty) to Allah, and know that Allah is severe in requiting (evil).

— translated by Muhammad Habib Shakir

The phrase "...whoever profits by combining the visit with the pilgrimage" is notable, because the Arabic word used here is tamattu`, which literally means "to do Mut'ah". All Muslims agree that this verse refers to the Mut'ah of Hajj.

=== Sunni view ===
Sunnis considered this hadith as Sahih and it is found in the first and second of their Six major Hadith collections, the Two Sahihs, both believed by Sunnis to contain only authentic hadith (Arabic: sahih). In both of them, it is included among the chapters of the Hajj related subjects.

Muslim ibn al-Hajjaj, a 9th century sunni Islamic scholar comments in his Book Sahih Muslim:

This hadith been narrated on the authority of Jurairi with the same chain of transmitters, and Ibn Hatim said in his narration:" A person said according to his personal opinion, and it was Umar."

A Sunni tafsir includes:

The Sahaba of Rasulullah Imran Ibn Abi Husain said the verse of Mut'ah appeared in the Hadith of Rasulullah and however no verse from the Quran descended allowing it. Rasulullah(s) gave order allowing for the practise of Mut'ah for a specific situation and we did practiced in with his knowledge. However, Rasulullah abrogated the ruling and forbade the practice before his death.

Some Sunni commentators of hadith have put Imran ibn Husain among the Salaf in favor of Nikah Mut'ah after Muhammad, based on this narration.

However, the major Sunni opinion is that this hadith actually refers to the Mut'ah of Hajj. Sunni Muslims believe that this view is strengthened by the fact that in both Sahih's, the hadith is included under Hajj-related topics. Yahya ibn Sharaf al-Nawawi, a 13th century Sunni Islamic scholar, the author of the commentary of Sahih Muslim supports the view that this hadith concerning Mut'ah refers to the Mut'ah of Hajj.

Ibn Kathir, a 14th century Sunni Islamic scholar wrote on his commentary of Al-Baqara, 196:

This last Hadith proves that Tamattu` (doing Mut'ah) is legislated. It is reported in the Two Sahihs that `Imran bin Husayn said, "We performed Hajj At-Tamattu` in the lifetime of Allah's Messenger and then the Qur'an was revealed (regarding Hajj At-Tamattu`). Nothing was revealed to forbid it, nor did he (the Prophet) forbid it until he died. And somebody said what he wished (regarding Hajj At-Tamattu`) according to his own opinion.

Ibn Kathir thus believed that "The verse of Mut'ah" mentioned in the hadith refers to Al-Baqara, 196.

The same view was held by Ibn Hajar al-Asqalani, a 14th century Sunni Islamic scholar and Ibn al-Jawzi.

=== Shi'a view ===
Shi'a view this hadith as notable and important on several accounts, and often include it when discussing the hadith that related to Nikah Mut'ah.

They view that this verse confirms that Umar prohibited Nikah Mut'ah, and that the reason the Sahaba were not more vocal in their rejection of Umar's verdict (fatwa) was due to fear of life. This, in turn, is line with the Shi'a notion of Umar being responsible for a military Coup d'état during the Succession to Muhammad.

Shi'a notice the Sahaba Imran ibn Husain waited till his dying state before passing on what he knew of the subject, and in fact insisted that the one receiving the information would not pass it on in case he survived.

Shi'a also complain about the Sunni translator Muhammad Muhsin Khan translating the Arabic word "Mut'ah" that appears in the original text into English Mut'ah of Hajj, making it impossible to interpretation as Nikah Mut'ah.

Shi'a view that what is called "Verse of Mut'ah" is a reference to an-Nisa, 24.

== See also ==
- List of hadith
