= Road to Makkah =

Makkah Route Initiative
- Mission statement: To streamline the immigration process for pilgrims to Makkah
- Commercial?: No
- Type of project: Initiative
- Location: Makkah, Saudi Arabia
- Owner: Ministry of Hajj and Umrah (Saudi Arabia)
- Founder: Ministry of Hajj and Umrah (Saudi Arabia)
- Established: 2019
- Status: Ongoing

Makkah Route Initiative is a Saudi Arabian initiative to streamline the immigration process for pilgrims to Makkah. The initiative was launched in 2019 by the Ministry of Hajj and Umrah and has been implemented in eight countries: Pakistan, Maldives, Malaysia, Indonesia, Morocco, Bangladesh, Côte d’Ivoire and Türkiye.

== History ==
The Road to Makkah initiative is part of Saudi Arabia's efforts to make the Hajj pilgrimage more convenient and efficient for pilgrims. The initiative has been praised by many pilgrims, who have said that it has made the process of traveling to Mecca much easier.

Under the Road to Makkah initiative, pilgrims are able to complete their immigration requirements at their home country's airport before they depart for Saudi Arabia. This saves pilgrims several hours upon arrival in the kingdom, as they can simply enter the country without having to go through immigration again.
