= Grand Hajj Symposium =

Cultural and scientific meeting in Mecca, Saudi Arabia

- Frequency: Annually
- Location: Makkah
- Years active: 1977
- Sponsor: Ministry of Hajj and Umrah

The Grand Hajj Symposium is a cultural and scientific meeting held annually in Mecca, Saudi Arabia, during the Hajj season. The first symposium was held in 1977 with under the title of "Acquaintance in Hajj". The symposium is organized by the Ministry of Hajj and Umrah with the participation of scholars, thinkers, Intellectuals, and writers of the Islamic world.

== Objectives ==
The Grand Hajj symposium has several goals to achieve; these include:

- Exhibiting the cultural and civilizational role of the two Holy Mosques throughout the various ages.
- Conducting an intellectual dialogue and discussion about issues related to the Hajj.
- Creating a scientific network to link specialist researchers around the globe.
- Raising awareness among Muslims through the cultural activities of Hajj.
