= Salm Alzwaher =

Village in Saudi Arabia

Salm Alzwaher Arabic: سلم الزواهر
- Village
- Location within Saudi Arabia
- Coordinates: 19°49′27″N 40°44′28″E
- Country: Saudi Arabia
- Province: Makkah
- Governorates: Laith

Population
  - Total: 5,000
- Time zone: UTC+3 (AST)
- Area code: 7HF2RPFR+JC

Salm Alzwaher (also known as Salm Al-Zawher) (Arabic: سلم الزواهر) is a village in the Emirate of Makkah in Saudi Arabia. It is located in the Laith Governorate. The village includes a mosque and train station is located in the village.
