= As Sayl as Saghir =

As-Sayl Aṣ-Ṣaġīr Arabic: ٱلسَّيْل ٱلصَّغِيْر
- Village
- Location in Saudi Arabia As-Sayl Aṣ-Ṣaġīr (Middle East) As-Sayl Aṣ-Ṣaġīr (West and Central Asia)
- Coordinates: 21°30′23″N 40°28′56″E
- Country: Saudi Arabia
- Province: Makkah
- Governorate: Taif
- Time zone: UTC+3 (EAT)
  - Summer (DST): UTC+3 (EAT)

Al-Sayl Al-Saghir (Arabic: ٱلسَّيْل ٱلصَّغِيْر, romanized: As-Sayl Aṣ-Ṣaġīr) is a village in Makkah Province, in western Saudi Arabia.

== See also ==
- List of cities and towns in Saudi Arabia
  - Miqat of Qarnul-Manazil at As-Sayl Al-Kabir
  - At-Ta'if
- Regions of Saudi Arabia
- Sarat Mountains
  - Hijaz Mountains
- Taif International Airport
