= Taif International Airport =

Taif International Airport مطار الطائف الدولي
- IATA: TIF; ICAO: OETF

Summary
- Airport type: Military/Public
- Operator: Military of Saudi Arabia
- Serves: Taif and Mecca
- Location: Taif, Saudi Arabia
- Elevation AMSL: 4,848 ft (1,478 m)
- Coordinates: 21°29′0.24″N 40°32′29.48″E

Map
- Location of airport in Saudi Arabia

Runways
Direction	Length		Surface
Direction	ft	m	Surface
07/25	12,254	3,735	Asphalt
17/35	10,991	3,350	Asphalt

Taif International Airport (IATA: TIF, ICAO: OETF), formerly Taif Regional Airport, is an airport in Taif, Saudi Arabia. The airport is located 30 km to the east of Taif and 70 km from Mecca. The airport is considered important in Saudi aviation history as it witnessed the first landing of Ibn Saud's plane, founder of the Kingdom. It was converted to a regional airport in 2009 when GACA allowed international airlines to operate at the airport as the city's population was increasing and to reduce pressure on the three main airports at the time.

== Airlines and destinations ==
Airlines	Destinations
Air Arabia	Sharjah
Air Arabia Egypt	Alexandria, Cairo
Air Cairo	Cairo
AlMasria Universal Airlines	Cairo
EgyptAir	Cairo
Flyadeal	Dammam, Riyadh
Flydubai	Dubai–International
Flynas	Dammam, Kuwait City, Muscat, Riyadh
Jazeera Airways	Seasonal: Kuwait City
Nesma Airlines	Cairo
Nile Air	Cairo
Oman Air	Muscat
Qatar Airways	Doha
SalamAir	Seasonal: Muscat
Saudia	Abha, Dammam, Jeddah, Jizan, Medina, Riyadh, Sharurah
Turkish Airlines	Istanbul

== See also ==
- List of airports in Saudi Arabia
- Saudia
- General Authority of Civil Aviation
- King Abdulaziz International Airport
- List of cities and towns in Saudi Arabia
  - As-Sayl As-Saghir
  - Miqat of Qarnul-Manazil at As-Sayl Al-Kabir
- Regions of Saudi Arabia
