= Nikah mut'ah =

Temporary marriage in Shiite Islam

Nikah mut'ah (Arabic: نكاح المتعة, romanized: nikāḥ al-mutʿah, "pleasure marriage"; temporary marriage) or sigheh (Persian: صیغه) is a private and verbal temporary marriage contract that is practiced in Twelver Shia Islam in which the duration of the marriage and the mahr must be specified and agreed upon in advance. It is a private contract made in a verbal or written format. A declaration of the intent to marry and an acceptance of the terms are required as in other forms of marriage in Islam. The Zaidi Shia reject Mutah marriage.

The length of a temporary marriage varies and can be as brief as an hour or stipulated to be as long as ninety-nine years. Traditionally, a temporary marriage does not require witnesses or registration, though taking witnesses is recommended. The Oxford Dictionary of Islam indicates the minimum duration of the marriage is debatable and periods of at least three days, three months, or one year have been suggested.

Some present this relationship as a more regular kind of trial marriage compared to the free relationship between men and women in the West.

Sunnis and Shiites agree that this marriage is a pre-Islamic Arabic tradition and is not prohibited by the Quran. According to Shiites, the tradition was approved by Muhammad and continued among Muslims during his lifetime. According to Sunnis, although the practice was initially approved by Muhammad, it was later banned by him. Both sides emphasize the sharp role of Caliph Omar in the ban. Quran 4:24, which is referenced on the subject, is given with translations that highlight different understandings. (see: Hadith of Mut'ah and Imran ibn Husain)

Some Muslims and Western scholars have stated that both Nikah mut'ah and Nikah misyar are Islamically void attempts to religiously sanction prostitution which is otherwise forbidden.

== Background ==
Historically there were many types of marriages, used for various purposes, as opposed to a full marriage; in mut'ah some of the rights of the husband and wife are non-existent. This was primarily used by those who could not stay at home with their wife and traveled a lot. For example, a traveling merchant might arrive at a town and stay for a few months, in that period he may marry a divorced woman or widow, and they would take care of each other. When he has to leave to the next town, the marriage is over, and he might sign a mut'ah contract at his next place. In modern times such a thing is considered obsolete, due to the availability of fast travel, and primarily exists in Iran and Shia regions for sexual pleasure reasons as a means of Halal dating.

Mut'ah, literally meaning joy, is a condition where rules of Islam are relaxed. It can apply to marriage (the nikah mut'ah) or to the Hajj (the obligatory pilgrimage) (the Mut'ah of Hajj). The permissibility of Mut'ah is disputed by majority of the Sunni scholars, who argue that the practice was banished by Muhammad. Twelver Shia scholars, on the other hand, assert that Mut'ah was sanctioned by Muhammad, but was banished by the Second Caliph 'Umar. Omar's abolition was not accepted in many scholarly circles and was met with staunch opposition from major companions like 'Imràn b. Husayn, Ibn 'Abbas, as well as Omar's son 'Abd Allàh b. 'Umar. Both Shias and Sunnis agree that, initially, or near the beginning of Islam, Nikah mut'ah was a legal contract.

The prominent companion and Caliph Abd Allah ibn al-Zubayr was born of nikah mut'ah between Zubayr ibn al-Awwam and Asma bint Abi Bakr. According to al-Raghib al-Isphahani, Abu Dawood al-Tayalisi, and Qadhi Sanaullah Panipati, were major scholarly personalities born of Mut'ah.

== Religious views ==
=== Twelver Shia ===
According to Twelver Shia jurisprudence, preconditions for mut'ah are: The bride must not be married, she must attain the permission of her wali if she has never been married before, she must be Muslim or belong to Ahl al-Kitab (People of the Book), she should be chaste, must not be a known adulterer, and she can only independently do this if she is Islamically a non-virgin or she has no wali (Islamic legal guardian). At the end of the contract, the marriage ends and the wife must undergo iddah, a period of abstinence from marriage (and thus, sexual intercourse). The iddah is intended to give paternal certainty to any children should the wife become pregnant during the temporary marriage contract. The Twelver Shias give arguments based on the Quran, hadith (religious narration), history, and moral grounds to support their position on mut'ah. They argue that the word of the Qur'an takes precedence over that of any other scripture, including Quran 4:24, known as the verse of Mut'ah.

According to Zeyno Baran, this kind of temporary marriage provides Shi'ite men with a religiously sanctioned equivalent to prostitution. These views are contested by others, who hold that mut'ah is a temporary wedlock option in Islam for avoiding illegal sex relations among those Muslims whose marriage is legitimate but, for certain constraints, they are unable to avail it. From this point of view, mut'ah is neither concubinage nor prostitution. Religious supporters of mut'ah argue that temporary marriage is different from prostitution for a couple of reasons, including the necessity of iddah in case the couple have sexual intercourse. According to this interpretation of the rules of iddah, if a woman marries a man in this way and has sex, she has to wait a number of months before marrying again and therefore, a woman cannot marry more than three or four times in a year.

Iranicaonline states that in Iran, which bans men and women from meeting freely, in order to overcome this ban, temporary marriage, which does not include sexuality, can be made with adult, children, or even infants. The purpose of this is to remove the legal consequences of meetings between men and women in their respective immediate families and enables them to circumvent the law of sexual segregation legitimately.

Despite mota'a being legally and religiously legitimate, it is still culturally marginalized and stigmatized in Iran, and contemptuously dismissed as prostitution by Iranians.

=== Sunni ===
In authentic hadith found in Sahih Muslim 1407, Ali himself corrected Ibn Abbas regarding nikah mut'ah that the prophet Muhammad forbade it forever on the day of Khaibar:

'Ali (Allah be pleased with him) heard that Ibn Abbas (Allah be pleased with them) gave some relaxation in connection with the contracting of temporary marriage, whereupon he said: Don't be hasty (in your religious verdict), Ibn 'Abbas, for Allah's Messenger (ﷺ) on the Day of Khaibar prohibited that forever - along with the eating of flesh of domestic asses.

— Sahih Muslim 1407

Ali also narrated in Sahih al-Bukhari 4216 that it was forbidden by the prophet Muhammad at Khaibar:

Narrated `Ali bin Abi Talib: On the day of Khaibar, Allah's Messenger (ﷺ) forbade the Mut'a (i.e. temporary marriage) and the eating of donkey-meat.

— Sahih Bukhari 4216

Because of these narrations (and many others forbidding it), all Sunni scholars consider it forbidden until the Day of Judgement, and that anyone who does not consider it forbidden either have not heard the authentic hadith on the topic yet or are following their own whims and desires and twisting interpretations of the Qur'an.

Regarding verse 4:24 of the Qur'an, Sunnis say this verse is not in reference to mut'ah marriage and this is a misinterpretation (intentional or not). Rather it is simply stipulating conditions for a normal, valid nikah. Their evidence is that the same wording for mahr, al-ajr, is used in another verse of the Qur'an: al-Ahzab 33:50, which again stipulates that mahr is a condition for a valid normal marriage contract. Even if the Shi'a were correct, for argument's sake, that the verse in surat al-Nisa' indicates mut'ah marriages, it still has been abrogated anyways by the prophet Muhammad as reported by imam Ali himself when he corrected ibn Abbas.

During the sixteenth century, during the reign of Akbar, the third emperor of the Mughal Empire who started the religion Din-i Ilahi, debates on religious matters were held weekly on Thursdays. When discussing nikah mut'ah, Shi'ite theologians argued that the historic Sunni scholar Malik ibn Anas supported the practice. However, the evidence from Malik's Muwatta (manual of religious jurisprudence) was not forthcoming. The Shi'ite theologians persisted and nikah mut'ah was legalized for the Twelver Shia during Akbar's reign.

According to Sunni Arab jurisdiction of Jordan; if the nikah mut'ah meets all other requirements, it is treated as if it were a permanent marriage (i.e. the temporary conditions are invalid and void).

The thirteenth century scholar, Fakhr al-Din al-Razi said,

Amongst the Ummah there are many great scholars who deem Mut'ah to have been abrogated, whilst others say that Mut'ah still remains.

The Gharab al-Quran, the dictionary of Qur'anic terms states,

The people of Faith are in agreement that Mut'ah is halal, then a great man said Mut'ah was abrogated, other than them remaining scholars, including the Shi'a believe Mut'ah remain halal in the same way it was in the past. Ibn Abbas held this viewpoint and Imran bin Husain.

De facto temporary marriages were conducted by Sunnis by not specifying how long the marriage would last in the written documents themselves while orally agreeing to set a fixed period.

Even though nikah mut'ah is prohibited by the four Sunni madh'habs (legal schools of law), several types of innovative marriage exist, including misyar (ambulant) and ʿurfi (customary) marriage; however these are distinct from the Twelver Shia understanding. Some regard misyar as being comparable to nikah mut'ah: for the sole purpose of "sexual gratification in a licit manner". In Ba'athist Iraq, Uday Hussein's daily newspaper Babil, which at one point referred to the Shi'ites as "Rafida", a sectarian epithet for Shia, condemned Wahhabi clerics as hypocrites for endorsing Misyar while denouncing Mut'ah.

According to classical Sunni scholars such as Ibn Hazm (384 - 456 A.H / 994 - 1064 C.E), Ibn Hajar al-Athqallani (773 - 852 A.H / 1372 - 1449 C.E), etc.; numerous prominent companions continued to believe in the permissibility of practising Mut'ah after the death of the Prophet. Early Sunni hadith scholars such as `Ata' ibn Abi Rabah, Ibn Jurayj, Ahmad ibn Hanbal etc. deemed Mut'ah marriages valid and permissible. Yemeni scholar Al-Shawkani (1759 CE /1173 AH - 1839 CE /1255 AH); reported in Nayl al-Awtar that the influential Sunni Mufassir Ibn Jarir al-Tabari (839–923 CE / 224–310 AH) held the same view. Some Sunnite scholars narrated that Malik ibn Anas and Al-Shafi'i sanctioned temporary marriages.

According to prominent Indian Salafi scholar Waheed-ud-Deen Zaman:

"On the topic of Mut'ah, differences have arisen amongst the Sahaba, and the Ahl al-Hadith, and they deemed Mut'ah to be permissible, since Mut'ah under the Shari'ah was practiced and this is proven, and as evidence of permissibility they cite verse 24 of Surah Nisa as proof. The practice of Mut'ah is definite and there is ijma (consensus) on this and you can not refute definite proof by using logic."

== Critical views ==
Some commentators have argued that mut'ah approximates prostitution, and asserted that it has been used to cover for child prostitution. Julie Parshall writes that mut'ah is legalised prostitution which has been sanctioned by the Twelver Shia authorities. She quotes the Oxford encyclopedia of modern Islamic world to differentiate between marriage (nikah) and Mut'ah, and states that while nikah is for procreation, mut'ah is just for sexual gratification. Dawoud el-Alami, a lecturer at the University of Wales, wrote that the recent resurgence in the practice of mut'ah among Iraqi and Iranian Shi'tes was equivalent to "disguised prostitution".

== In popular culture ==
The Girl Sitting Here is a (2021) short film directed by Azadeh Nikzadeh about a temporary marriage contract. Bahar (Bahar Beihaghi) a young woman, in exchange for funds to cover the costs of a surgery negotiates a temporary marriage deal with Mr. Payam (Neimah Djourabchi).

== See also ==
- Misyar marriage
- Criticism of Twelver Shia Islam
- Islamic marital jurisprudence
- Jihad al-nikah
- Marriage of convenience
- Nikah Halala
- Nikah Misyar
- Pilegesh
- Walking marriage
