= Jabal Omar =

Neighbourhood in Mecca, Saudi Arabia

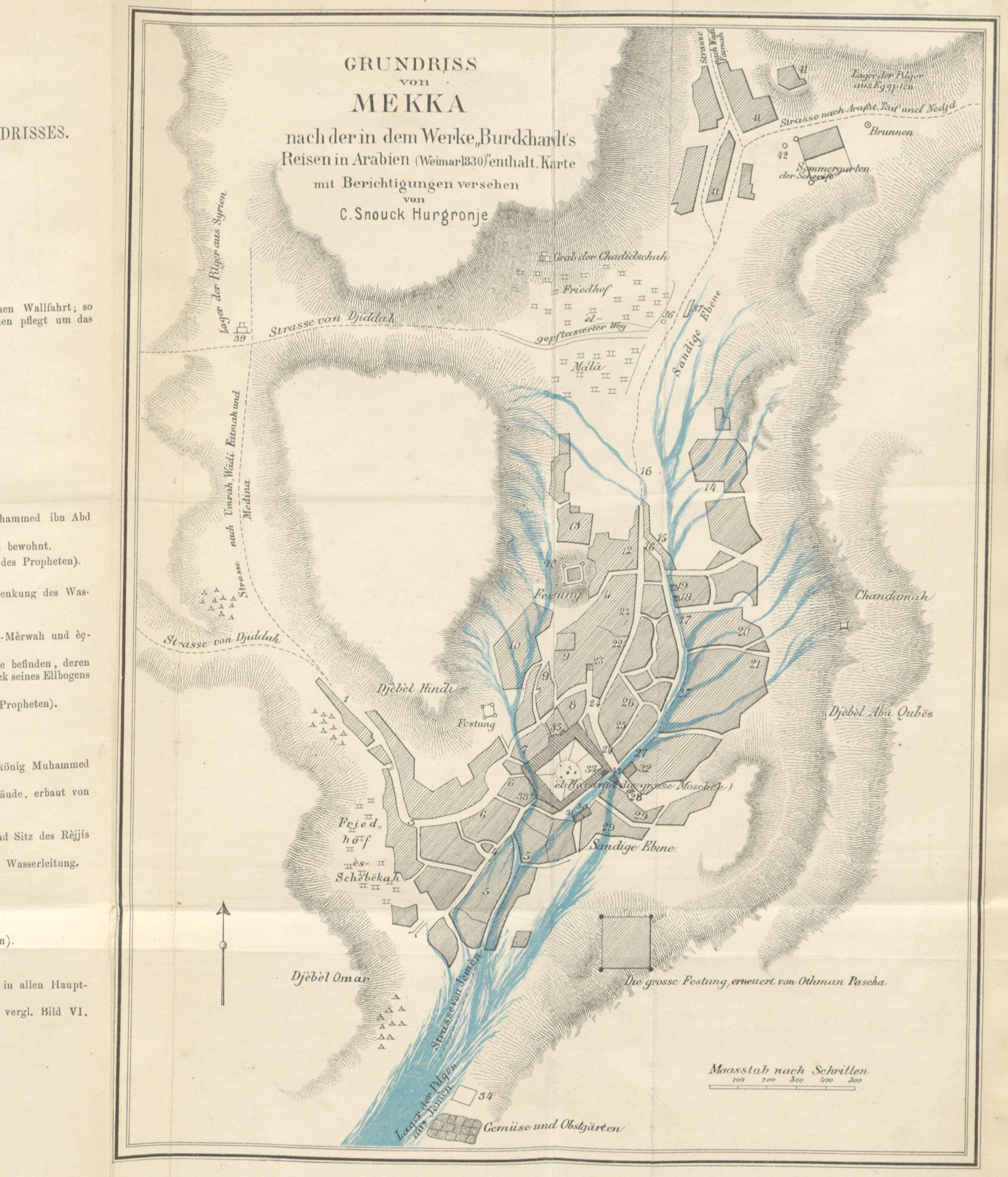
Map of 'Mekka 1830

'Jabal Omar (Arabic: جبل عمر) is a neighbourhood located in Makkah, Saudi Arabia south of the Al Haram district.

== Description ==
Jabal Omar is named for the hill Mount Omar that traditionally stood on the southern outskirts of Mecca and currently consists of a group of old housing units that were built randomly over the years. There are currently no facilities in the Jabal Omar area, especially sanitation facilities. However, in late 2006, a clearance program was begun in Jabal Omar to provide the necessary space for the establishment of the Jabal Omar project.

Jabal Omar is in the sub-municipality of Ajyad (بلدية أجياد).

== Jabal Omar project ==
The Jabal Omar project is a development project in Jabal Omar, including a mix of residences, hotels, and commercial buildings designed to serve people coming to the area on pilgrimage. It was started in 2006, when the Saudi government set up the Jabal Omar Development Company with an initial budget of $1.6 billion, and plans to construct over 90 buildings.

Designs and architectural support have come from companies including Foster and Partners and Buro Happold. As of 2024, the initial vision has not been realized, but construction has included a 15-tower complex abutting the southwest edge of the Masjid al-Haram plaza, and two residential towers.
