= Imran ibn Husain =

Companion of Muhammad

- Title: Imam

Personal life
- Born: Mecca
- Died: 673 Basra, Iraq
- Era: Sahaba
- Main interest(s): Hadith, Fiqh
- Other name: Abu Nujayd
- Occupation: Muhaddith, Qadi

Religious life
- Religion: Islam

Imran ibn Husain ibn ‘Ubayd ibn Khalaf al-Khuzā’i (Arabic: عمران بن حُصَيْن) (d. 52 AH c. 673 CE in Basra, Iraq) was one of the Sahaba (Companions) of the Islamic Prophet Muhammad and a well-known reciter of the Quran, a Qadhi (Judge) and narrator of hadith.

== Biography ==
Imran ibn Husain and his father, Husain ibn Ubayd, both embraced Islam in the seventh year after hijra, following the Battle of Khaybar. He participated in several battles under the leadership of Muhammad, and he held the banner of his tribe, the Banū Khuzā‘ah amid the Conquest of Mecca. During the caliphate of Umar Ibn Al-Khattab, Imran was sent to Basra, to preside as a judge and instruct its inhabitants in Islamic jurisprudence and administer as lieutenant to governor Abu Musa Ashāri while he was away from Basra. Hasan Al-Basri and Ibn Sirin said of him, "No one of Rasulullah’s Companions who entered Basra can be considered better than Imran Ibn Husain."

During the First Fitna (literally “trial”) period of dissension and civil war (656-661) between Imam Ali Ibn Abu Talib and Muawiyah I, Imran did not just hold a neutral position, but appealed to people to abstain from violence. Imran is recorded as having said, "I would prefer to be a shepherd on top of a mountain till I die rather than shoot an arrow at anyone in either party, right or wrong." Any Muslim he encountered, Imran would advise them by saying, "Keep to your mosque. If it is broken into forcefully, then keep indoors. If the doors are broken into forcefully by someone who aims at taking your life and wealth, then fight him."

=== Miracles ===
One of the miracles (kiramāt) that is widely related in traditional Islamic sources is that ‘Imran was able to hear the angels’ returning salutations to him (at the end of each ritual prayer) until he was cauterized. Thereafter he no longer heard their greetings until God later restored [that favor] to him.

== Views ==
Ibn Hazm, an 11th century Sunni Islamic scholar included him in a list of Sahaba who deemed Nikah Mut'ah (temporary marriage) to be legal.

== Legacy ==
Among the hadith he narrated are:

- Hadith of Mut'ah and Imran ibn Husain
