= Mut'ah of Hajj =

The "mut'ah of Hajj" ("hajj al-tamattu", meaning "joy of Hajj") is the relaxation of the ihram ("sacred state") between the Umrah and Hajj, including its dress code and various prohibitions.

== History ==
When arranging a pilgrimage, the participant is asked to declare their objective before the outset of the journey. If the pilgrimage begins with only the intention of it being a minor one and the pilgrim decides after starting it that it will be a major one, they need to go a certain distance away from Mecca, and then start a new pilgrimage, intending to do the greater one.

Muhammad decreed that Umrah and Hajj can be combined, i.e.: starting a pilgrimage with the intention of participating in both events.

== Overview ==
There exist two forms of pilgrimage, the "minor pilgrimage "(Arabic Umrah) and the "major pilgrimage" (Arabic Hajj). The major one contains more rules, and is obligatory upon all Muslims (if they can afford it financially, but if they can not afford it financially it is not obligatory) to perform once per life. While doing a pilgrimage, whether minor or major, the Muslim needs to adhere to some very strict dress codes that also includes some other rules (Arabic: Ihram).

In pre-Islamic Arabia, if one would go to the minor pilgrimage a short period before the major one would commence, he was forbidden to go out of the dress code if he intended to follow it up with a Major pilgrimage.

This rule was abrogated by Muhammad, who said it was permissible to leave the state of Ihram if one intended to attend Hajj. and this relaxation became known as "joy" (Arabic: Mut'ah) or more distinctly, the "joy of pilgrimage", Mut'ah of Hajj or in Arabic: Hajj al-Tamattu.

== See also ==
- Mut'ah
- Rashidun
- Triple talaq

== External sources ==
- https://web.archive.org/web/20050405010046/http://www.islam-pure.de/imam/fatwas/manasik02.htm
- https://quranx.com/Hadith/Bukhari/USC-MSA/Volume-2/Book-26/Hadith-635
- https://quranx.com/Hadith/Muslim/USC-MSA/Book-7/Hadith-2803.
