= Nusuk =

Saudi digital platform for Hajj and Umrah services

- Developer: Ministry of Hajj and Umrah
- Release: 26 September 2022; 4 years ago
- Operating system: iOS, Android
- Platform: Mobile app, web application
- Available in: 25 languages
- Type: Pilgrimage services
- Website: www.nusuk.sa

Nusuk (Arabic: نسك, romanized: Nusuk) is a Saudi digital platform and mobile application for planning and managing services related to the Hajj, Umrah and visits to Islamic holy sites in Saudi Arabia. It is developed by the Ministry of Hajj and Umrah and provides services including Umrah permits, bookings for visits to Al-Rawdah Al-Sharifah, support services and pilgrimage planning tools.

The platform was launched in September 2022 as a unified electronic gateway for pilgrims and visitors travelling to Mecca and Medina. Later service channels include Nusuk Hajj, for Hajj registration and package booking in eligible countries, and Nusuk Umrah, for international Umrah visa applications and related travel services. By March 2026, the platform had more than 51 million users worldwide.

== History ==
The Ministry of Hajj and Umrah (MHU) launched Nusuk on 26 September 2022 as a unified electronic platform and a gateway to Mecca and Medina. The launch followed the earlier Eatmarna application, whose services included registration for Umrah and Hajj performers and permits for visits to Al-Rawdah Al-Sharifah. The platform was intended to facilitate electronic visit and Umrah visa procedures and support pilgrim access to religious and historical sites in the kingdom.

For Hajj 2023, applicants from Australia, Europe and the Americas used Nusuk after Saudi Arabia moved away from the lottery system used for the previous Hajj. The platform covered applicants from 57 countries and listed Hajj packages and payment options; many applicants were selected in the order they applied until each country's quota was reached.

In 2023, Saudi officials promoted Nusuk internationally, including through a roadshow in Bangladesh. The platform was described as a system for planning, booking and creating Hajj or Umrah itineraries, including eVisa applications, hotels and flights.

In August 2025, Saudi Arabia launched Nusuk Umrah as a service allowing pilgrims outside Saudi Arabia to apply for Umrah visas and book pilgrimage-related services online without an intermediary. The service functions as a direct digital channel for visas, accommodation, transportation, cultural tours and support services, while accredited local agents remain available through the Nusuk Umrah system.

In June 2026, Mashariq Al-Dhahabiah (Sana), a Saudi Hajj service provider, announced that all Nigerian pilgrims would receive their Nusuk cards before departing for the 2027 Hajj.

== Services ==
Nusuk provides digital services in 25 languages connected to pilgrimage planning, religious visits, travel bookings and movement in Mecca and Medina. Services available through the app include issuing Umrah permits, booking visits to Al-Rawdah Al-Sharifah, checking crowd density, accessing support services, booking Haramain High Speed Railway tickets, arranging hotel accommodation and booking flights.

The Ministry of Hajj and Umrah stated in 2025 that the application offered over a hundred digital services. The app also includes maps, guided tours, the Quran, supplications, prayer times and qibla direction.

In October 2025, the ministry launched a service through Nusuk allowing citizens and residents in Saudi Arabia to order 330 ml bottles of Zamzam water for home delivery.

In August 2025, the MHU announced that Nusuk app access would be available offline for visitors through cooperation with Saudi telecom providers.

=== Nusuk Hajj ===
Nusuk Hajj is the Hajj registration and package booking channel of the platform. Applicants using Nusuk Hajj create an account, upload documents, complete an application, select a preferred category, top up an eWallet, browse service providers, select and book a package, and review their itinerary.

The platform supports the Direct Hajj Program, which allows eligible pilgrims in countries without official Hajj missions, including Muslim-minority countries, to register and book packages directly online. In 2023, Nusuk was used by applicants from 57 countries and offered packages and payment options for Hajj applicants.

In November 2025, registration for Hajj 2026 opened on Nusuk Hajj for pilgrims covered by the Direct Hajj Program. The ministry said applicants should register through the platform and avoid intermediaries, external offices or third-party services.

=== Nusuk Umrah ===
Nusuk Umrah is a digital service for international pilgrims seeking to perform Umrah. Introduced in August 2025, it allows users outside Saudi Arabia to request Umrah visas and arrange pilgrimage-related services through the platform rather than through a separate intermediary. Users can choose bundled packages or individual services, including visa processing, accommodation, transportation, cultural tours and other support services.

The service is offered in seven languages and is connected with relevant Saudi government platforms. It supports electronic payment and lets users complete the process online from application to visa issuance.

=== Nusuk Card ===
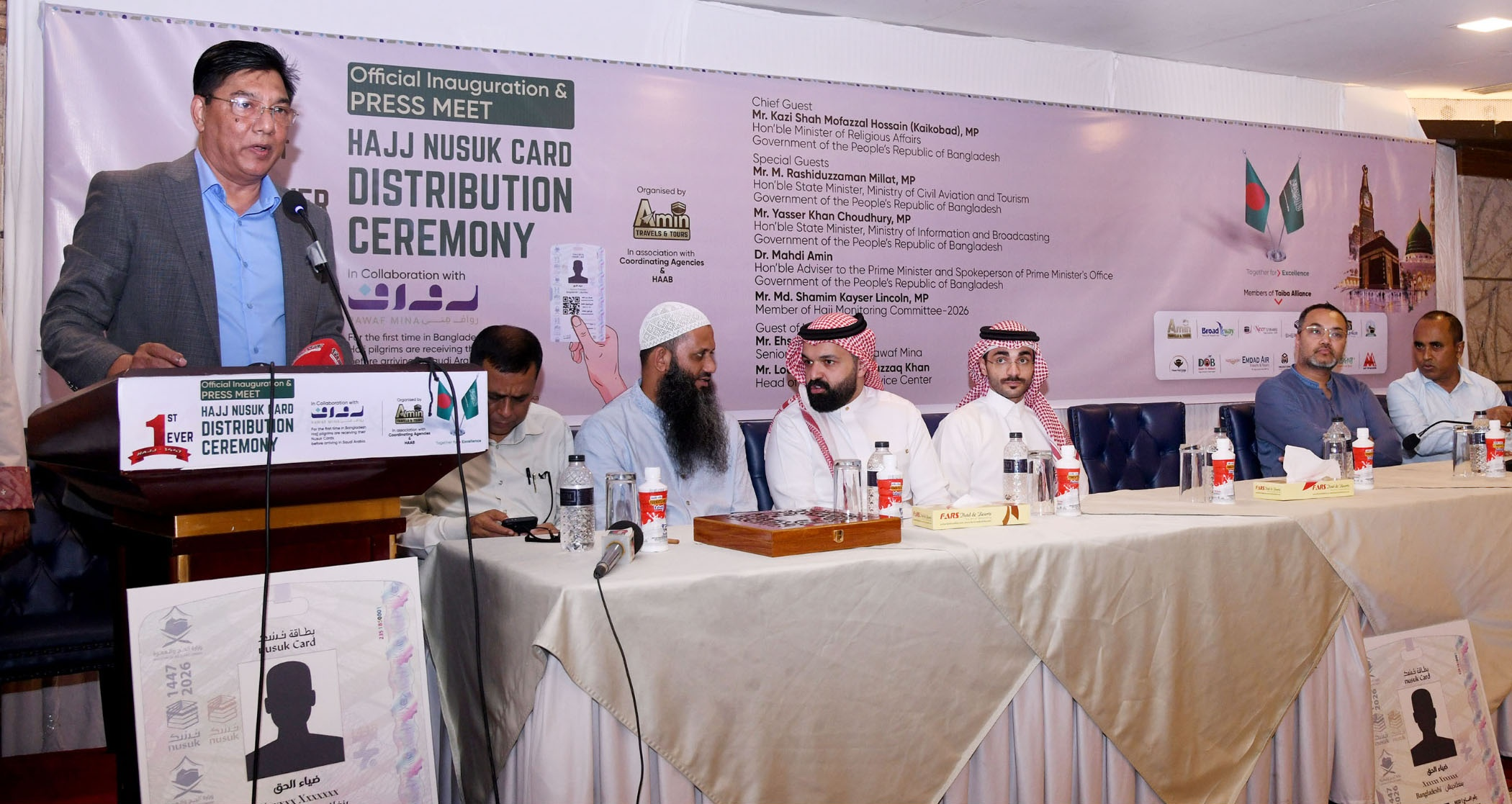
Nusuk Card distribution inauguration in Dhaka, Bangladesh, in 2026.

The Nusuk Card is an identification and access document associated with Hajj services. Saudi Arabia launched the card in 2024 to facilitate the movement of pilgrims at holy sites and provide access to services through the Nusuk and Tawakkalna applications.

The card allows pilgrims to register personal, health and other important information, and can be received through Hajj offices after obtaining a Hajj permit. It is used to support access to services such as accommodation and transport, and to provide information about historical, cultural and Islamic locations.

In April 2026, the MHU said that the card was a prerequisite for Hajj and a tool for regulating entry to Mecca and the Grand Mosque, facilitating movement between holy sites and accessing Hajj-related services.

In May 2026, Bahrain's Hajj Mission began distributing Nusuk cards to pilgrims through licensed tour operators before departure. The distribution covered 23 licensed tour operators and 4,625 Bahraini pilgrims.

== Adoption and concerns ==
Nusuk has been promoted as part of Saudi Arabia's broader pilgrimage digitisation and tourism programmes, including initiatives connected with Saudi Vision 2030. In Bangladesh, officials described the platform as a way for visitors to arrange eVisa applications, hotel bookings and flights through a single digital system.

Use of the platform expanded during 2024 and 2025. By September 2025, the MHU said application had surpassed 30 million downloads, compared with 12 million downloads in 2024, and served users from more than 190 countries. The ministry also said users outside Saudi Arabia represented more than 90 percent of total beneficiaries. In March 2026, Tawfig Al-Rabiah, the Minister of Hajj and Umrah, stated that Nusuk had more than 51 million users worldwide.

The platform's role in Hajj booking has also been discussed in relation to fraud and the transition from older national or local arrangements. In June 2024, Hajj package bookings for pilgrims from Europe, the United States and Australia had been limited to Nusuk, through which pilgrims could select packages, submit required documents and confirm payments to official entities and trusted tourism companies. The same article said the platform was used to verify identification documents and financial transfers for Hajj package bookings from 126 countries.

During the 2024 Hajj, some unregistered pilgrims said they were unable to access services because they could not show permits through Nusuk.

In March 2026, London police warned about fake websites posing as the official Hajj booking platform and advised pilgrims to use the official Nusuk website and travel agents listed on it. Fraudsters were reported to have adapted after the move to Nusuk, while police also said the platform had reduced some risks associated with unregulated agents.

In South Africa, Nusuk Hajj shifted the South African Hajj and Umrah Council's role from arranging Hajj travel to providing administrative, educational and guidance support for pilgrims.

== See also ==
- Ministry of Hajj and Umrah
