= As Sayl al Kabir =

Settlement in Saudi Arabia

As-Sayl Al-Kabir Arabic: ٱلسَّيْل ٱلْكَبِيْر Qarn al-Manāzil (قَرْن ٱلْمَنَازِل)
- Village
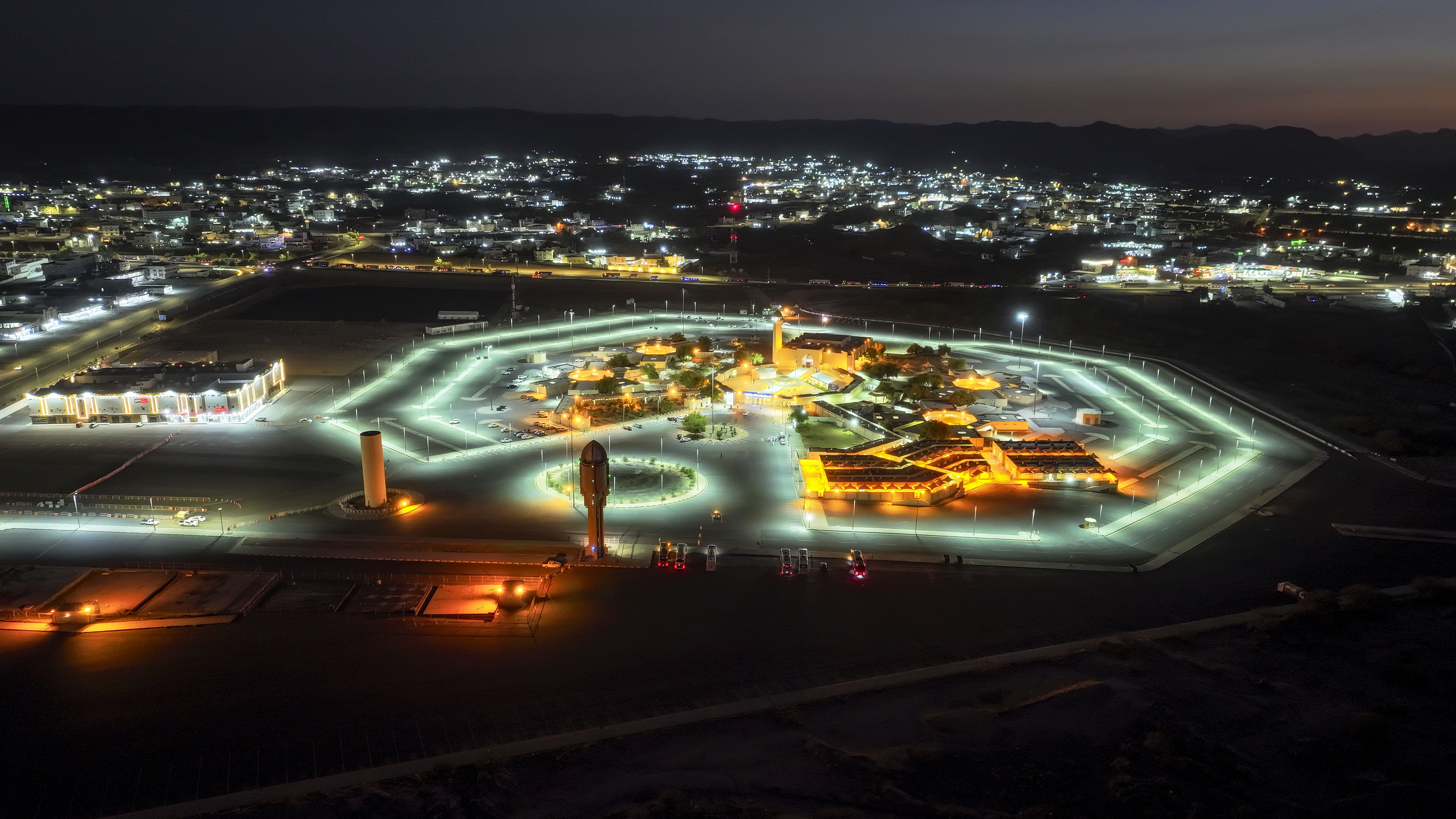
- The miqat of Qarnul-Manazil at As-Sayl Al-Kabir

- Location in Saudi Arabia As-Sayl Al-Kabir (Middle East) As-Sayl Al-Kabir (West and Central Asia)
- Coordinates: 21°37′35″N 40°24′55″E
- Country: Saudi Arabia
- Province: Makkah
- Governorate: Taif
- Time zone: UTC+3 (EAT)
  - Summer (DST): UTC+3 (EAT)

As-Sayl Al-Kabīr (Arabic: ٱلسَّيْل ٱلْكَبِيْر) is a village in Makkah Region, western Saudi Arabia, which is located some distance from the city of Taif. Abdullah ibn Abbas narrated that his cousin, the Islamic Prophet Muhammad, had fixed Qarn al-Manāzil (قَرْن ٱلْمَنَازِل) as the miqat for the people of Najd. It has also been used as a miqat by people coming from places like Oman, the U.A.E., Pakistan, Malaysia and Australia.

== Gallery ==
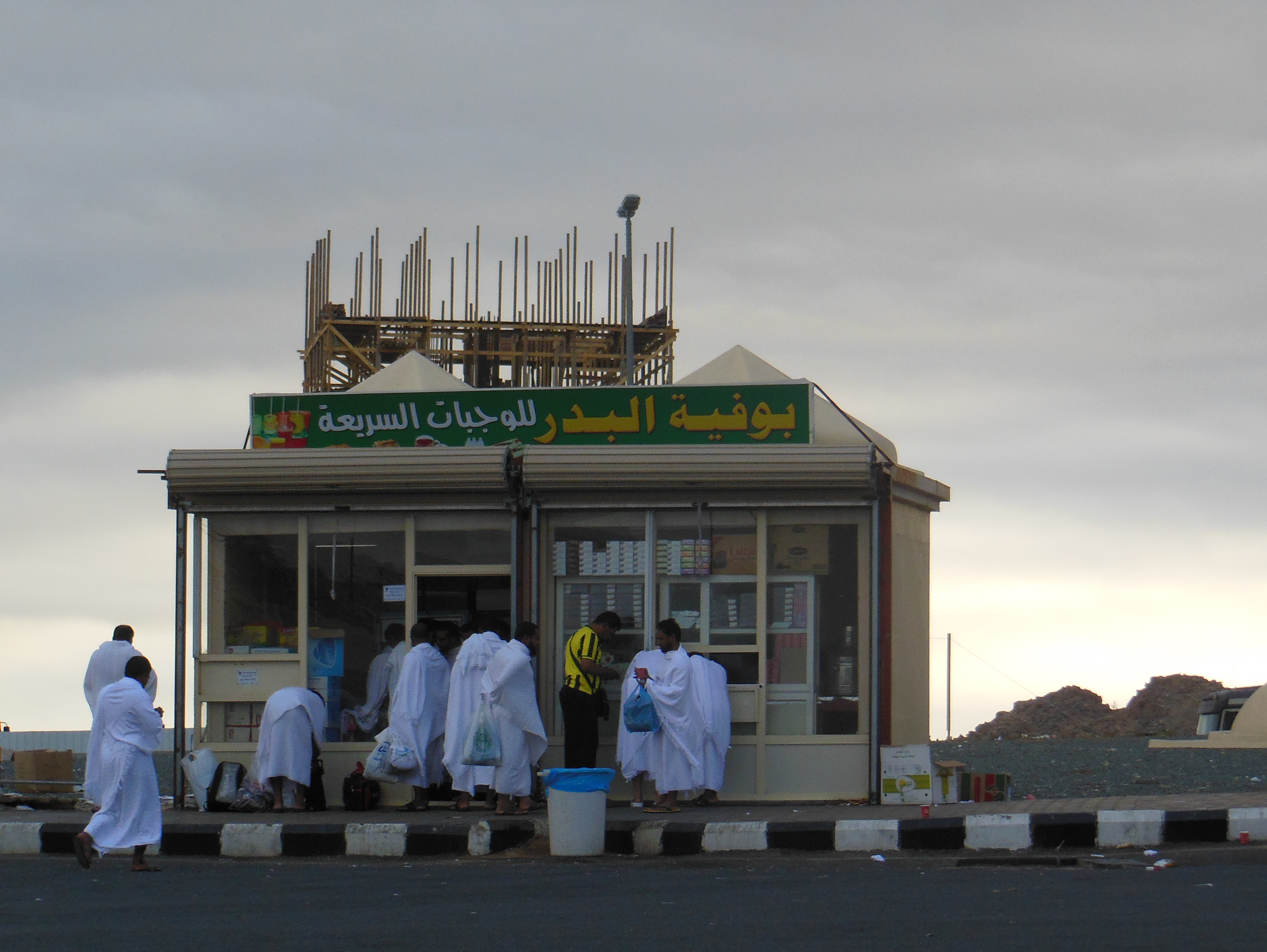
Tuck shop at Megat al Sayl Makkah.

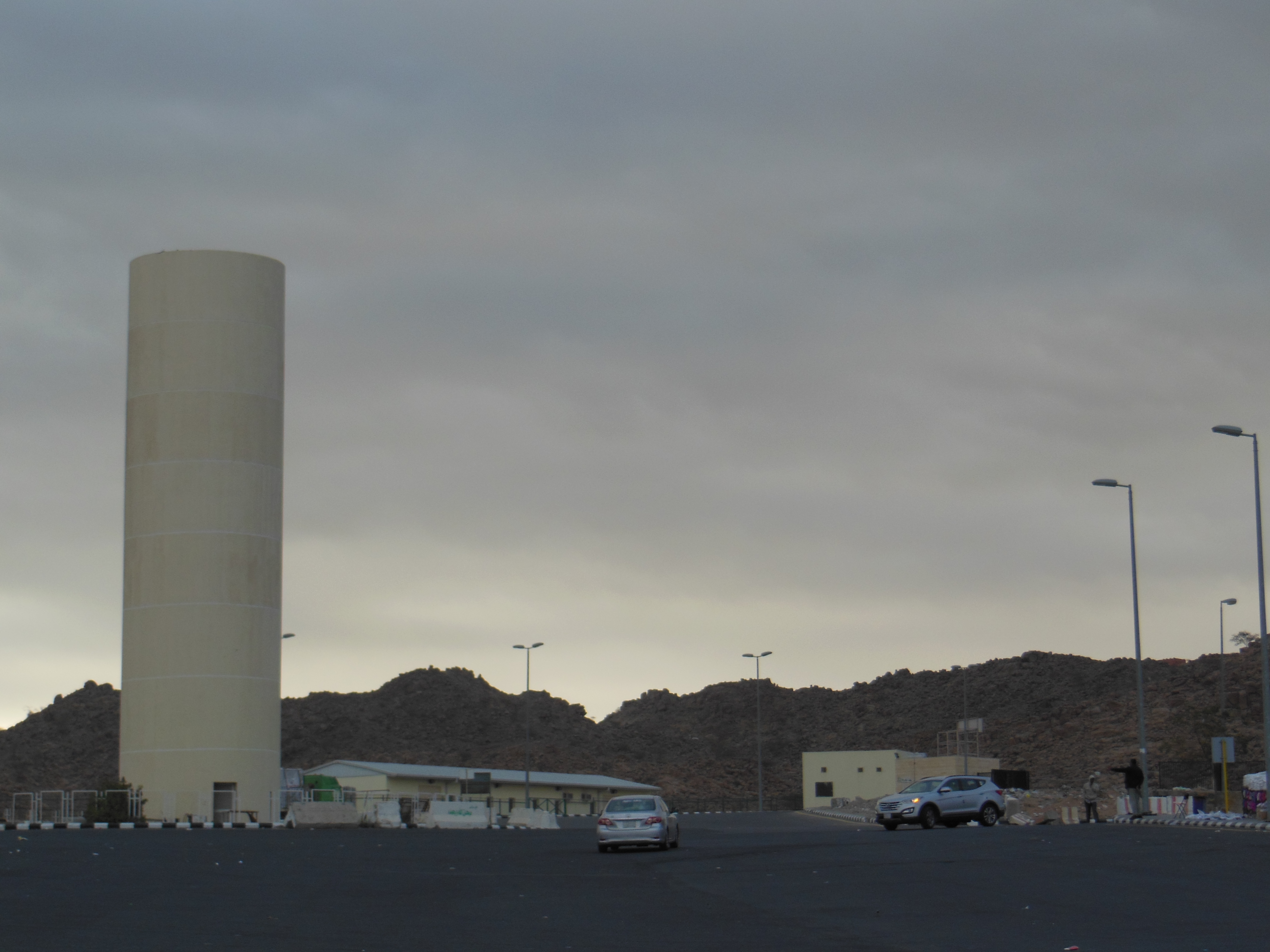
Water tank at Megat al Sayl Makkah.

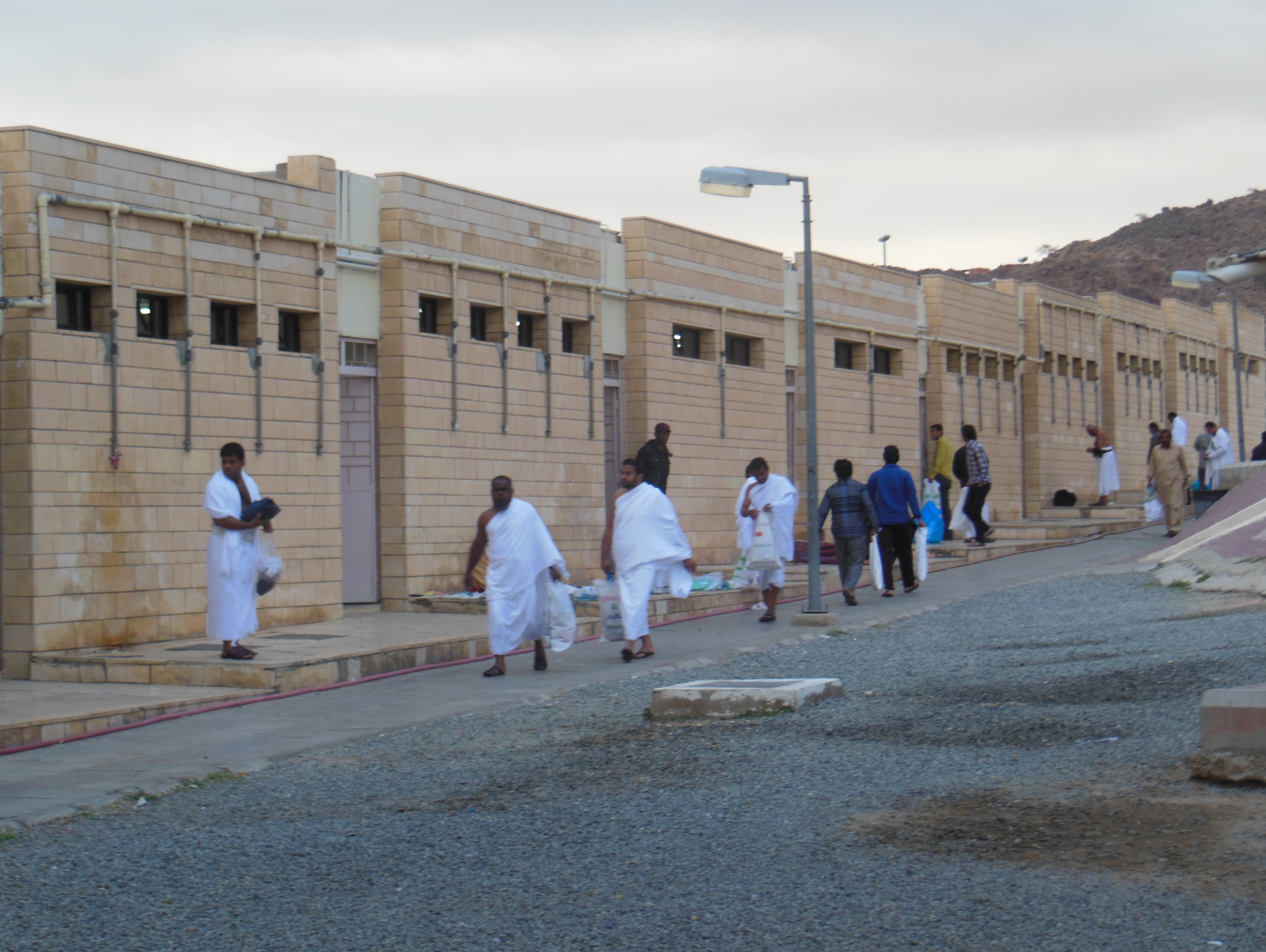
Ablution Stations at Megat al Sayl.

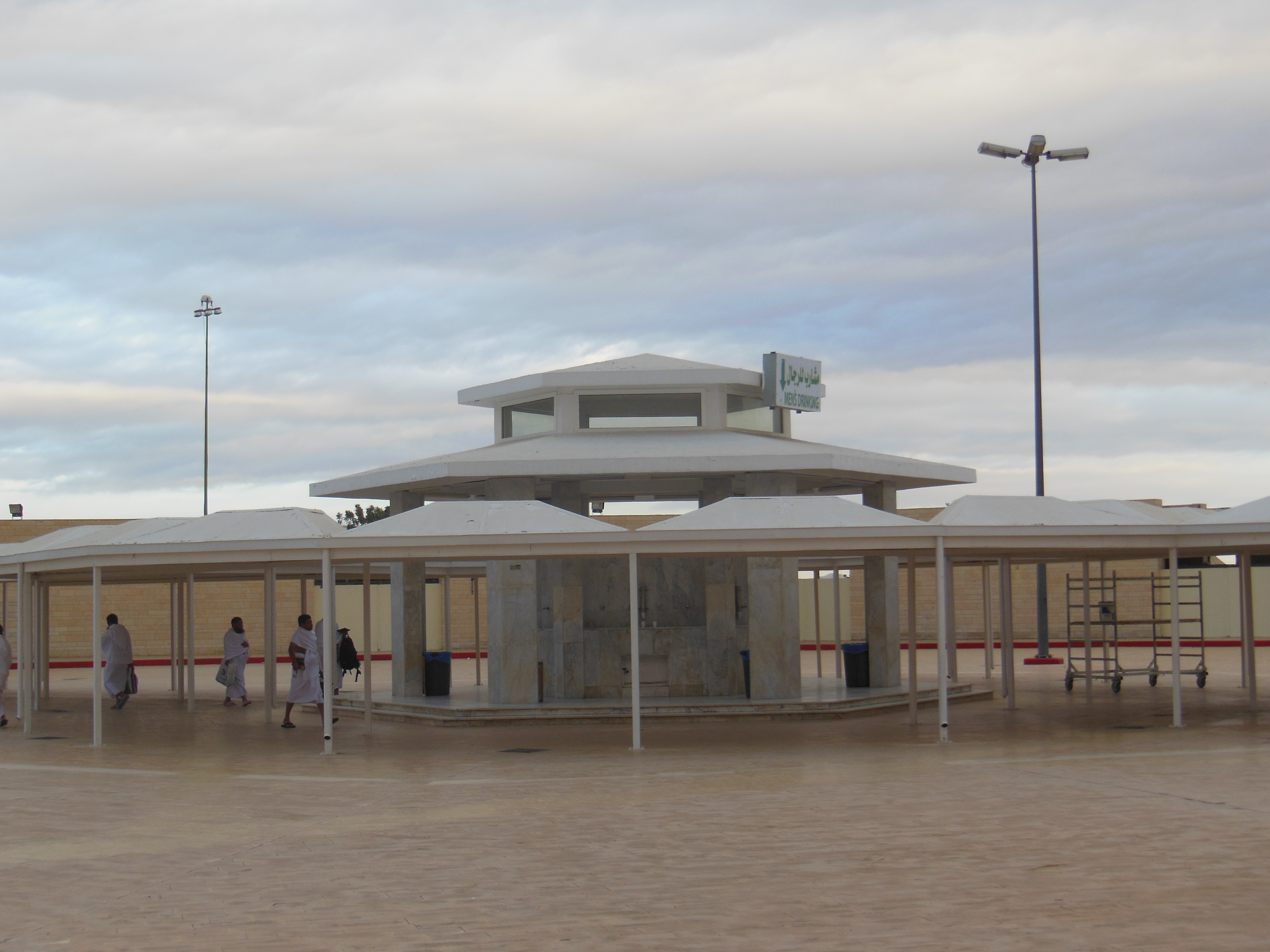
Sunshade at Megat al Sayl

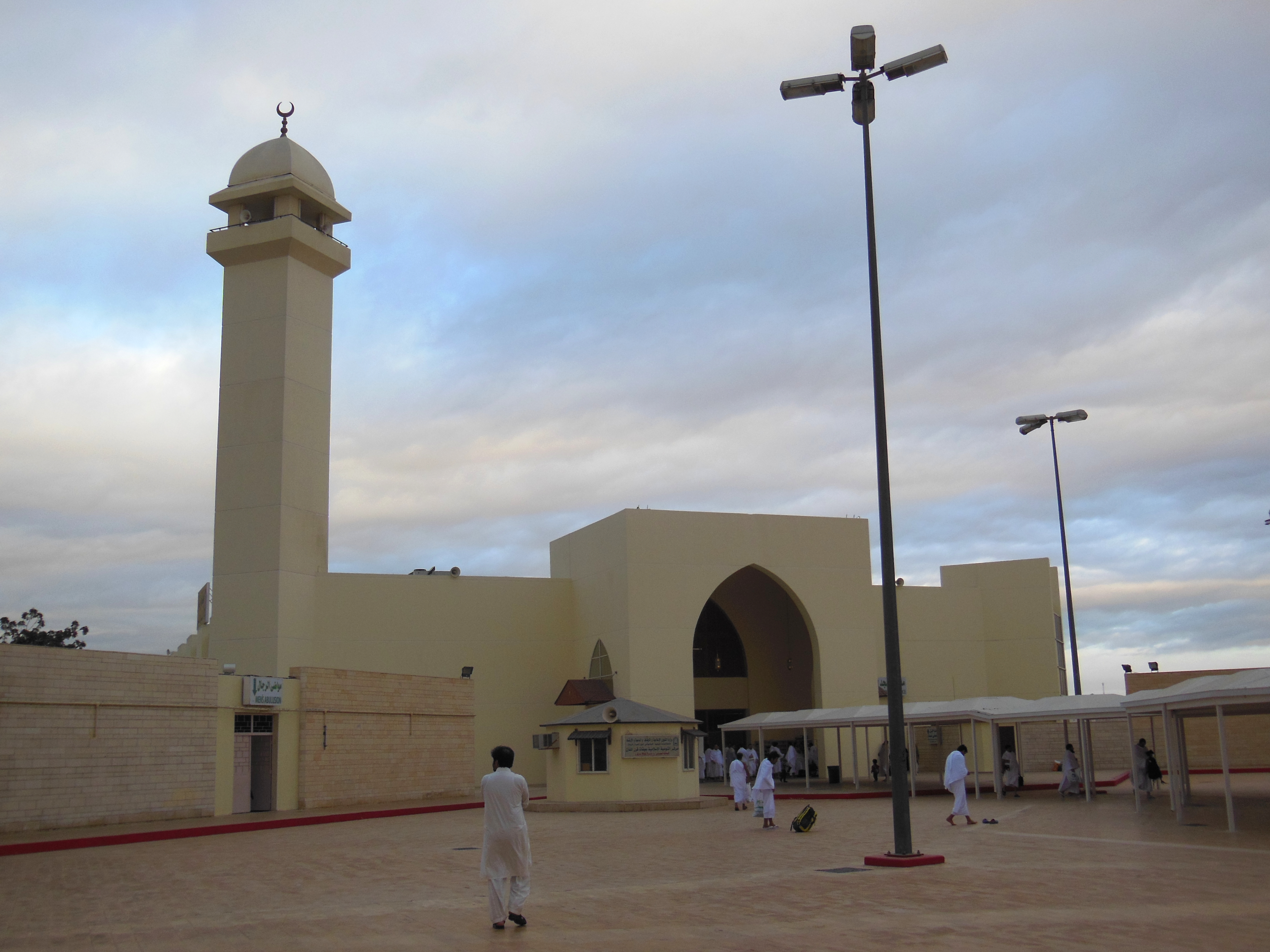
Megat Qarn al Manazil Mosque

== See also ==
- List of cities and towns in Saudi Arabia
  - As-Sayl As-Saghir
- Regions of Saudi Arabia
- Sarat Mountains
  - Hijaz Mountains
- Taif International Airport
