= Al Lith =

City in Saudi Arabia

Al Lith Arabic: ٱللِّيْث, romanized: Al-Līth
- City
- Nickname: The Pearl of the Red Sea
- Location in Saudi Arabia Al Lith (Middle East) Al Lith (West and Central Asia)
- Coordinates: 20°9′0″N 40°16′0″E
- Country: Saudi Arabia
- Province: Makkah (Mecca)
- Governorate: Al-Lith
- Joined Saudi Arabia: 1925; 101 years ago

Government
  - City Governor: Mohammad Al Qabbaa

Population (2022)
  - City: 20,811
  - Metro: 73,753 (Al Lith Governorate)
- Time zone: UTC+3 (EAT)
  - Summer (DST): UTC+3 (EAT)
- Postal Code: (5 digits)
- Area code: +966-12

Al Lith (Arabic: ٱللِّيْث, romanized: Al-Līth) is a city in the region of the Tihamah on the coast of the Red Sea, southwest of the Islamic holy city of Mecca, and south of the Miqat of Yalamlam. It is the fifth largest city in population in Mecca Province, and it is one of the large sea ports of the Kingdom of Saudi Arabia on the Red Sea. The population of Al Lith is over 20,800 people (2022 census).

== Geography and climate ==
It is located 90 kilometres (56 mi) south of the Miqat of Yalamlam, 180 kilometres (110 miles) to the southwest of Mecca, and 190 km (120 miles) south of Jeddah. Its northern villages are just 90 km (56 miles) away from Mecca. It extends to Hejaz mountains, and the cities of Adham and Taif to the east, and as far south as the city of Al Qunfudhah. The international coastal road Jeddah - Jizan passes by it. Al Lith has a hot desert climate (Köppen climate classification BWh).

Climate data for Al Lith
Month	Jan	Feb	Mar	Apr	May	Jun	Jul	Aug	Sep	Oct	Nov	Dec	Year
Mean daily maximum °C (°F)	30.7 (87.3)	31.6 (88.9)	34.2 (93.6)	35.0 (95.0)	39.3 (102.7)	41.3 (106.3)	41.9 (107.4)	41.2 (106.2)	39.8 (103.6)	37.1 (98.8)	34.0 (93.2)	32.1 (89.8)	36.5 (97.7)
Mean daily minimum °C (°F)	20.0 (68.0)	20.3 (68.5)	22.3 (72.1)	24.2 (75.6)	27.0 (80.6)	28.6 (83.5)	30.2 (86.4)	30.3 (86.5)	28.3 (82.9)	25.5 (77.9)	23.3 (73.9)	20.9 (69.6)	25.1 (77.1)
Average precipitation mm (inches)	20 (0.8)	6 (0.2)	7 (0.3)	11 (0.4)	8 (0.3)	2 (0.1)	2 (0.1)	4 (0.2)	3 (0.1)	8 (0.3)	20 (0.8)	21 (0.8)	111 (4.4)
Source: Climate-data.org

== History ==
Al Lith got its name from the Valley of Leith, which is located at the east, near the village of Ghumayqah (Arabic: غُمَيْقَة). Al Lith today is a commercial port that receives pilgrims and goods from all corners of the world. In the past, it used to be a large commercial port that receives ships from Jizan, Yemen and the coast of Africa, and exporting those goods after that to Mecca and Jeddah.

== Infrastructure ==
The area of Al Lith boasts prominent underwater diving sites.

== See also ==
- Arabian Peninsula
  - Hejaz
  - List of cities and towns in Saudi Arabia
