= Yalamlam =

Settlement in Saudi Arabia

Yalamlam يَلَمْلَم As-Saʿdiyyah (ٱلسَّعْدِيَّة) Saʿyā (سَعْيَا) Wādī Muḥram (وَادِي مُحْرَم)
- Village
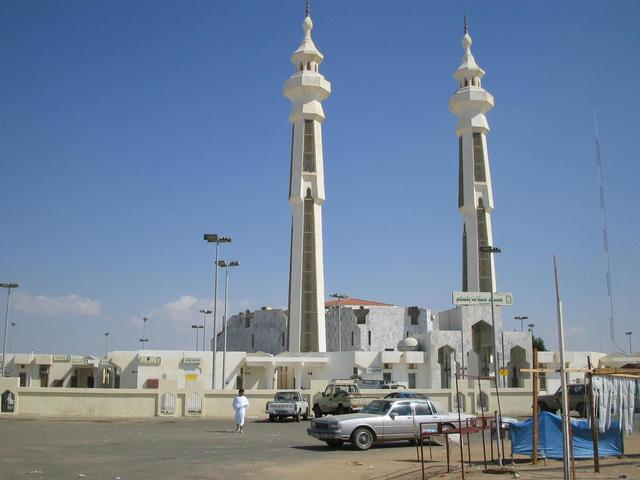

- Location in Saudi Arabia Yalamlam (Middle East) Yalamlam (West and Central Asia)
- Coordinates: 20°31′4.3″N 39°52′12.8″E
- Country: Saudi Arabia
- Province: Makkah (Mecca)
- Governorate: Al-Lith
- Established: 590+ C.E.
- Joined Saudi Arabia: 1925; 101 years ago
- Time zone: UTC+3 (E.A.T.)
  - Summer (DST): UTC+3 (E.A.T.)
- Area code: +966-
- Website: yalamlam.org

Yalamlam (Arabic: يَلَمْلَم), also known as As-Saʿdiyyah (ٱلسَّعْدِيَّة) or Wādī Muḥram (وَادِي مُحْرَم), is a Saudi village in Makkah Province, Governorate of Al-Lith, in the region of the Tihamah.

== Description ==
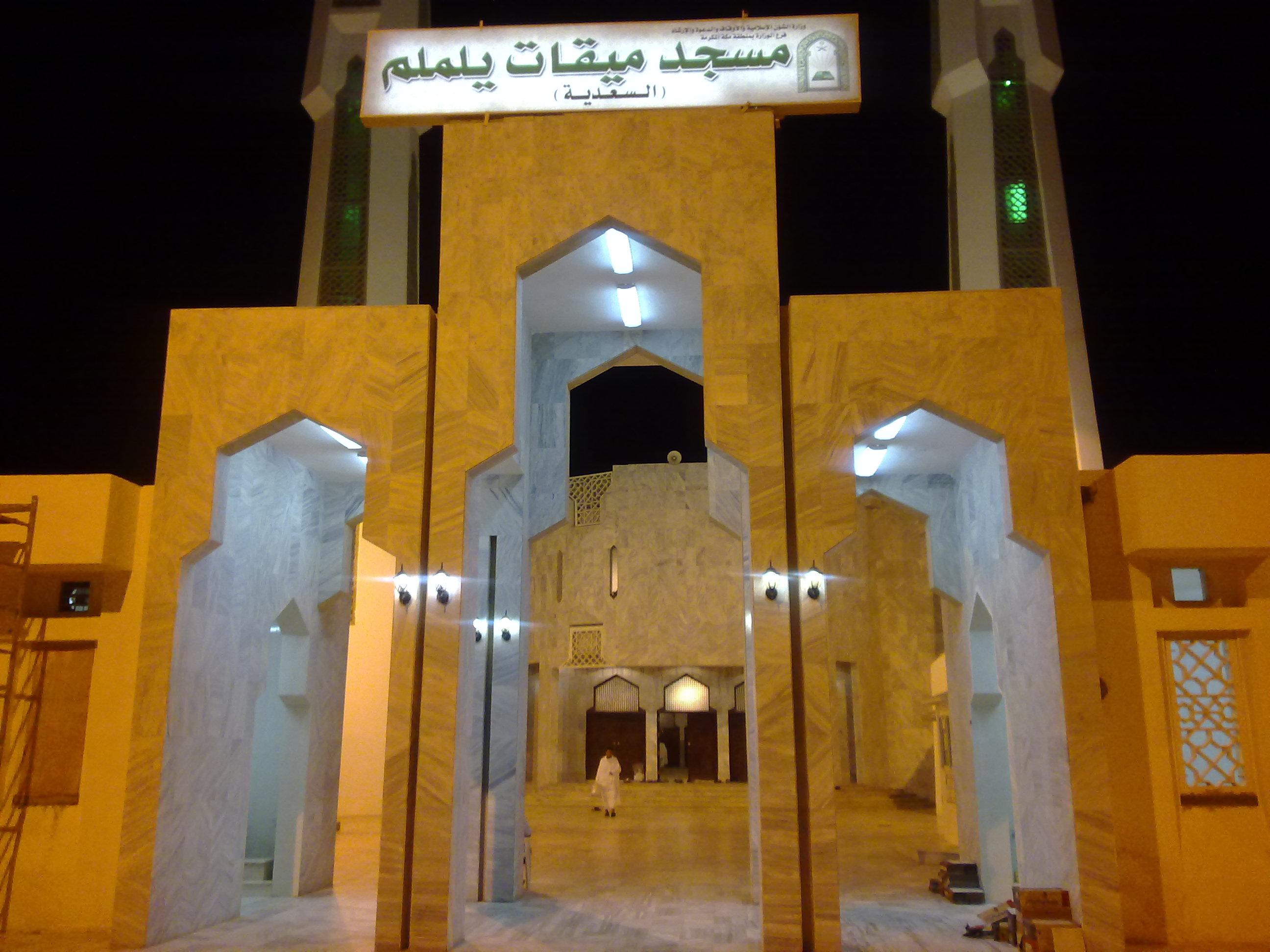
The Miqat of Yalamlam or As-Sa'diyyah, located 90 kilometres (56 mi) to the north of Al Lith

The Islamic prophet Muhammad assigned Yalamlam as the Miqat for pilgrims coming from the south of Mecca, particularly Yemen. Mīqāt Yalamlam (مِيْقَات يَلَمْلَم) is nowadays a small souq with a mosque. It is situated around 100 kilometres (62 mi) southwest of Mecca, and 90 kilometres (56 mi) north of Al Lith. This Miqat is historically the sole of Wādī Yalamlam (وَادِي يَلَمْلَم). The current location is assigned by the Saudi government to be near the Red Sea coastal road (National Road No. 5), at a location called Saʿyā (سَعْيَا).

== See also ==
- Arabian Peninsula
  - List of cities and towns in Saudi Arabia
- Red Sea
