= Al Tundobawi =

Al Tundobawi الطندباوي
- Neighborhood
- Country: Saudi Arabia
- Province: Makkah Province
- City: Mecca
- Time zone: UTC+3 (EAT)
  - Summer (DST): UTC+3 (EAT)

Al Tundobawi is a neighborhood of Mecca in Makkah Province, in western Saudi Arabia. Al Tundobawi is in the Municipality of Ajyad Sub.

Al Tundobawi is an older suburb of Mekkah located between the Al Haram District and the commercial center of Al Hindwiyah. Because of the proximity to Hajj activities Al Tundobawi has a tradition of providing water to pilgrims and in recent times has become the site of numerous upmarket cafes, and has acquired numerous upmarket hotels.

Despite the new construction, as of 2018 the neighborhood retains the urban fabric of a traditional Medieval Islamic city. However, the Saudi Kingdom have released several plans for the redevelopment of Mekkah, that critics say will destroy much of the heritage of the city. Some of these plans would see the transformation of at least some of the medieval suburb into an area of 20 storey concrete towers.
