= Ajyad =

Ajyad أجياد
- Neighborhood
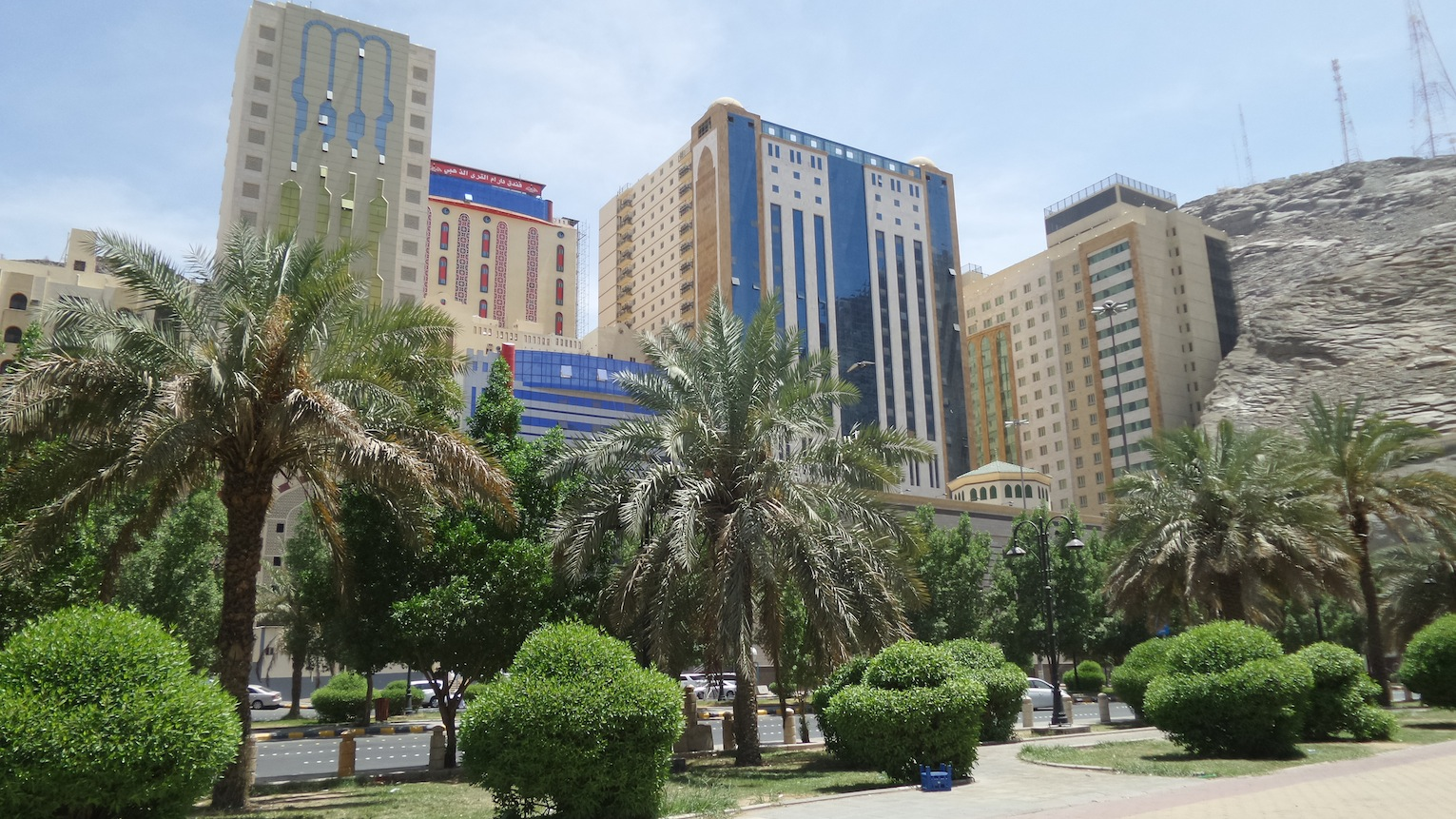
- Ajyad in 2015

- Location in Saudi Arabia
- Coordinates: 21°25′10″N 39°49′50″E
- Country: Saudi Arabia
- Province: Makkah Province
- City: Mecca
- Time zone: UTC+3 (EAT)
  - Summer (DST): UTC+3 (EAT)

Ajyad (Arabic: أجياد) is a historic neighborhood of Mecca in Makkah Province, in western Saudi Arabia. Ajya is directly south of Al Haram District.

== Description ==
Also known as Ajyad Al-Sagheer, the Ajyad al-Saghir, or Ajyad al-Sad, the street starts from the first Ajyad Gate and runs a turn north-east and ends with the Khtunda seal between Ajyad and the people of Abu Yusuf. The Department of Health lies to the south-east. Among the most famous quarters of the Ajyad neighborhood are the Umayyad background and the companions Muawiyah bin Abi Sufyan.

The Abraj Al Bait is on the western boundary of the neighborhood and the Al Haram district is on the northern boundary of the neighborhood.

== Literature ==
The Agyad is mentioned in the poetry of Al-Ashi bin Maimon bin Qais, saying.

فما أنت من أهل الحجون ولا الصفا ولا لك حق الشرب من ماء زمزم
ولا جعل الرحمن بيتك في العلا بأجياد غربي الصفا والمحرم

English Translation: So what are you of the people of Hajjun and Safa, and you have the right to drink from Zamzam water. And do not make the Rahman your home in the Aalaa Ajyad west of Safa and Mahram.

== Council ==
Ajyad is the seat of the municipality of Ajyad Sub (Arabic: بلدية أجياد) which extends from the "People of Amer north and to the King Abdul Aziz Tunnels in the east and to Ibrahim al-Khalil Street in the west. It once contained the Ajyad Fortress.
