= Ihram =

Sacred state

Ihram (Arabic: إِحْرَام, romanized: iḥrām, from the Semitic root Ḥ-R-M) is a sacred state which a Muslim must enter to perform the Hajj (major pilgrimage) or ʿUmrah (minor pilgrimage). A pilgrim must enter into this state before crossing the pilgrimage boundary known as the Miqat by performing cleansing rituals and wearing prescribed Ihram clothing.

== Clothing ==
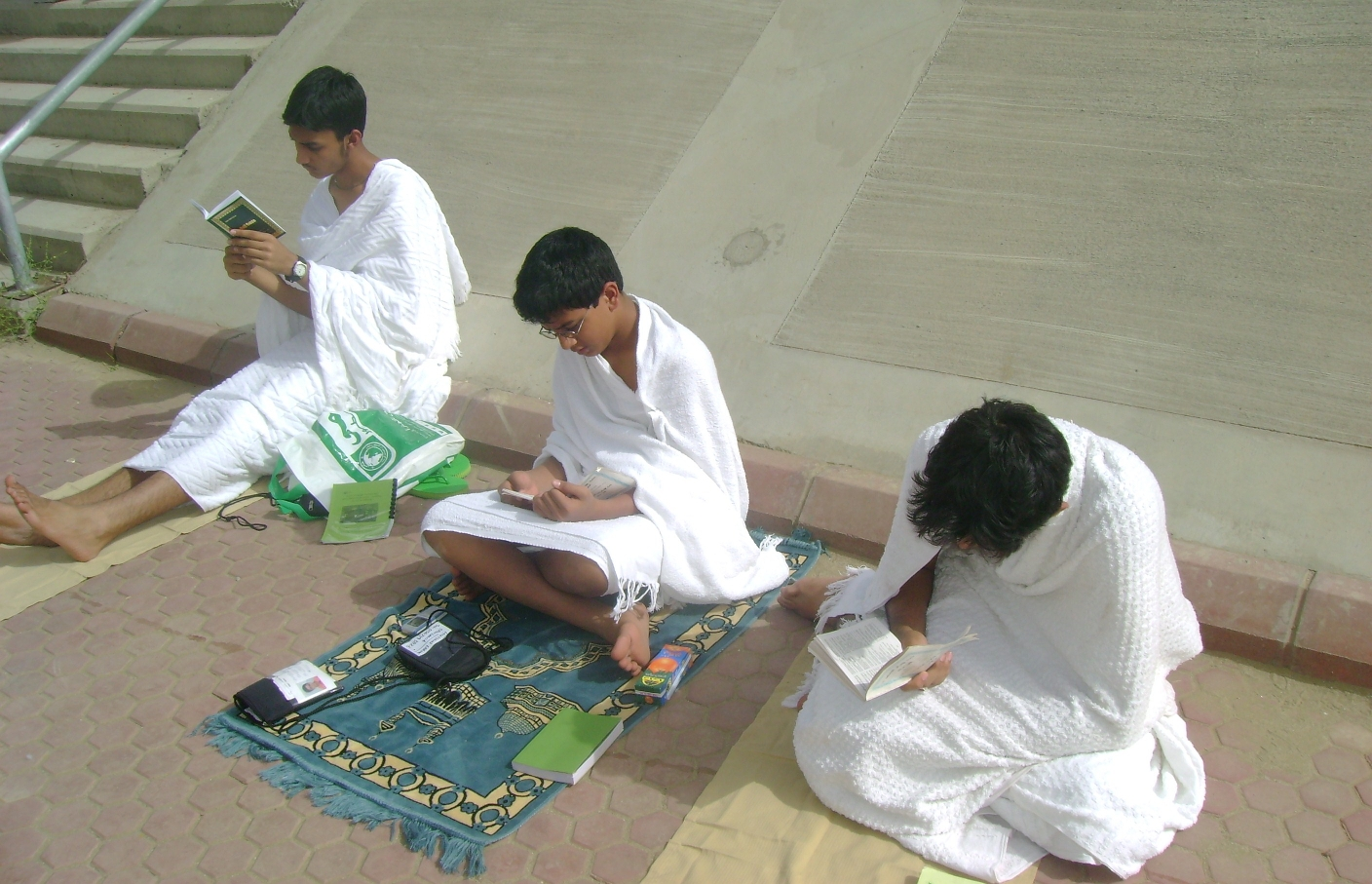
Boys wearing Ihram clothing supplicate during the Day of 'Arafat in the Hejaz

Ihram clothing (Ahram clothing) includes men's and women's garments worn by Muslim people while in a state of Iḥrām, during either of the Islamic pilgrimages, Hajj and/or ʿUmrah. The main objective is to avoid attracting attention. Men's garments often consist of two white unhemmed sheets (usually towelling material) and are universal in appearance. The top (the ridāʾ (Arabic: رِدَاء)) is draped over the torso, and the bottom (the izār (إِزَار)) is secured by a belt; plus a pair of sandals. Women's clothing, however, varies considerably and reflects regional as well as religious influences, but they often do not wear special clothing or cover their faces.

White ihram clothing is intended to make everyone appear the same, to signify that in front of God there is no difference between a prince and a pauper. Ihram also contributes to a feeling of unity that pilgrims have when they are in the city of Mecca, that they are all brothers and sisters joined to worship Allah. Although it is simply an item of clothing to be worn during the pilgrimage, there are many competing views on the proper wearing of ihram. For example, the exact number of days a pilgrim is required to wear ihram varies according to the type of pilgrimage the individual is performing. Ihram is typically worn during Dhu al-Hijjah, the last month in the Islamic calendar.

== Restrictions ==
=== Wearing ===
A man in the state of ihram must not tie knots or wear stitched items. Sandals and flip-flops may be stitched, but they should allow the ankle and back of the foot to be exposed (some other schools of thought also agree that the front of the foot must be shown as well).

In the state of ihram, men are not allowed to cover their heads or parts of it with a cloth or headwear.

In the state of ihram, women and men are prohibited from wearing gloves.

=== Scents ===
While in the state of ihram, a Muslim must not use any scents on the body or the robes. If the robe has been fouled by najas (نَجَس, dirty) material or has been wiped, rubbed or touched by scented liquids (intentionally), then a new iḥrām clothing must be worn, or the Umrah or Hajj will be invalid.

=== Self-grooming ===
Aside from being as clean (purified) as they are for prayer, male Muslims are expected to cut their nails, and trim their hair and moustache. They must also wear deodorant. They have to wear ihram clothing, which is a white, seamless garment. Many also shave their head as this is considered hygienic. Most will wait to shave their heads until after they have finished Umrah or Hajj, as this is a requirement to leave the state of ihram. Female Muslims are also expected to be clean. During the pilgrimage, sexual activity, smoking, and swearing are also forbidden.

=== Environment ===
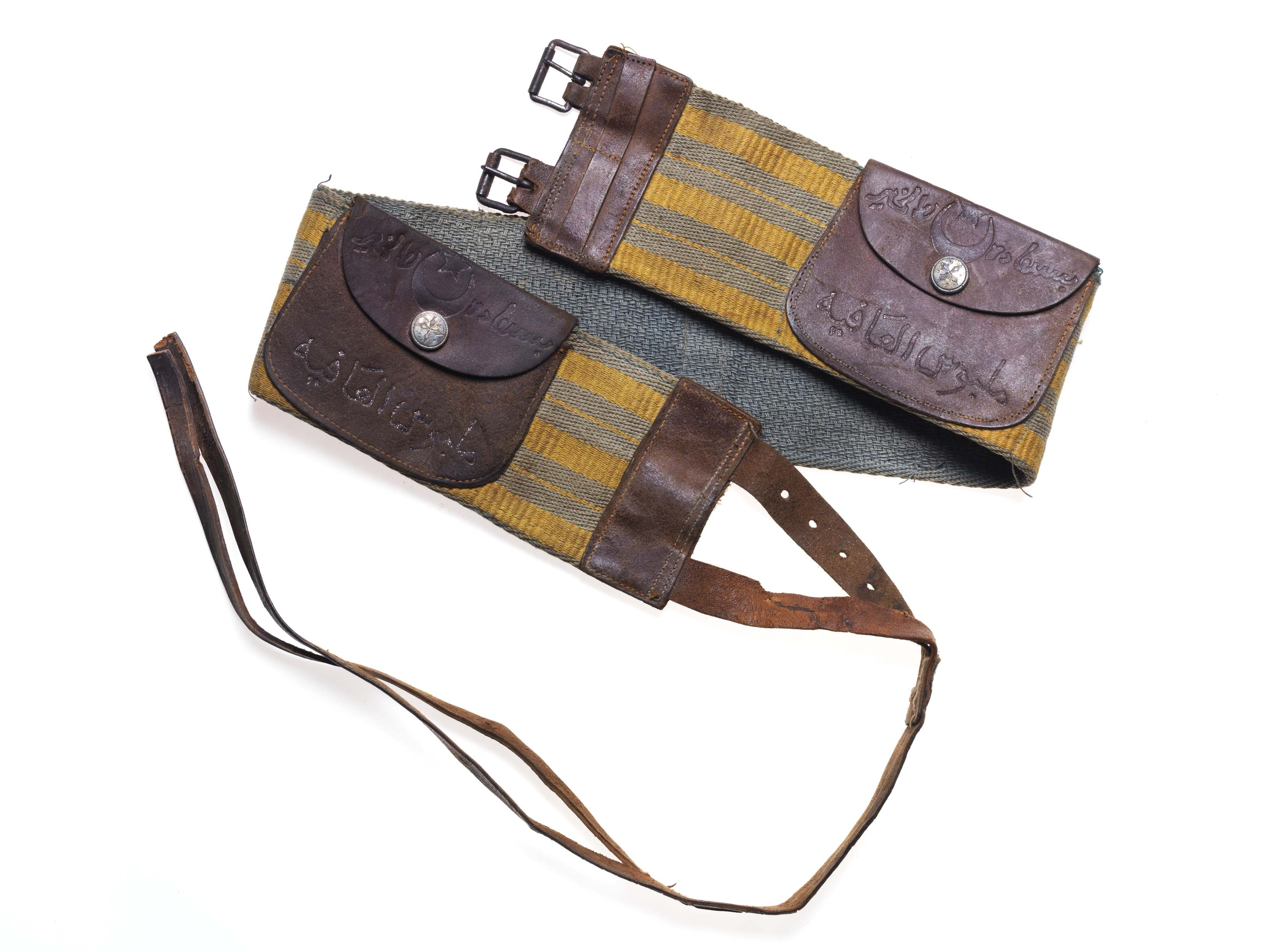
An Ihram belt used during a Hajj for carrying valuables, 19th century

It is forbidden for every pilgrim of Hajj and Umrah when in ihram to uproot, cut, break, or grind the branches of living trees in the Haramayn, the Two Sacred Places. These are Mecca and Medina (now in Saudi Arabia, and including the Masjid al-Haram, Mount Arafat, Muzdalifah, and Mina) and al-Aqsa (the region on top of the Temple Mount in Jerusalem). This is because the trees that thrive in the Haramayn are blessed.

It is forbidden for every person in ihram to hunt, shoot, kill, sacrifice, capture, confine, destroy or abuse any animal. This prohibition applies to all land animals, birds, and insects other than marine animals.

If a person accidentally steps on or kills small animals or insects, such as small black ants, grasshoppers, etc., he is not considered guilty, but he must pay a fine according to the value of the insects killed.

A person can kill animals and insects that may harm them or other pilgrims, such as mosquitoes, snakes, scorpions, and spiders. However, driving away the insect or animal first is preferable if possible.

== When flying ==
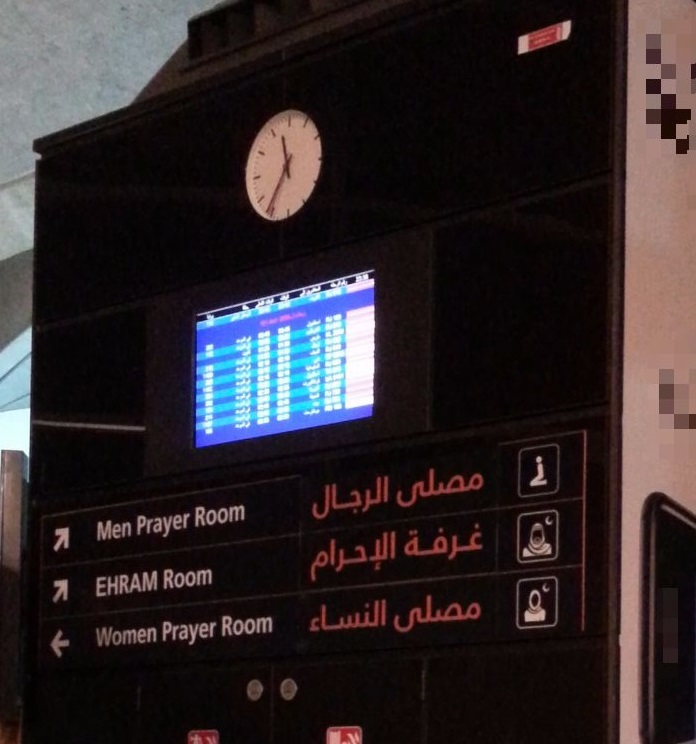
A sign listing flights and the location of an ihram room in Queen Alia International Airport, Amman, Jordan

When flying on pilgrimage, appropriate measures are usually taken to assure that the pilgrim will be in the state of ihram when flying above or alongside the stations of the Miqat. For this reason some airports in Muslim areas have dedicated ihram rooms where pilgrims can change into the necessary clothing. If flying with an airline originating from a Muslim-majority country, airline staff will announce passengers should enter ihram.

== See also ==
- Eid al-Adha
- Miqat Dhu al-Hulayfah
- Mut'ah of Hajj
- Islamic clothing
- Izaar
- Sarong a waist-wrap similar to the izar
