= Miqat =

Boundary marker for Islamic pilgrims

Mīqātu Qarnul-Manāzil Mīqāti Yalamlam Mīqātu Dhāti ʿIrq Mīqātal-Juḥfah Mīqātu Dhul-Ḥulayfah
- مِيْقَاتُ قَرْنُ ٱلْمَنَازِل مِيْقَاتِ يَلَمْلَم مِيْقَاتُ ذَاتِ عِرْق مِيْقَاتَ ٱلْجُحْفَة مِيْقَاتِ ذُو ٱلْحُلَيْفَة
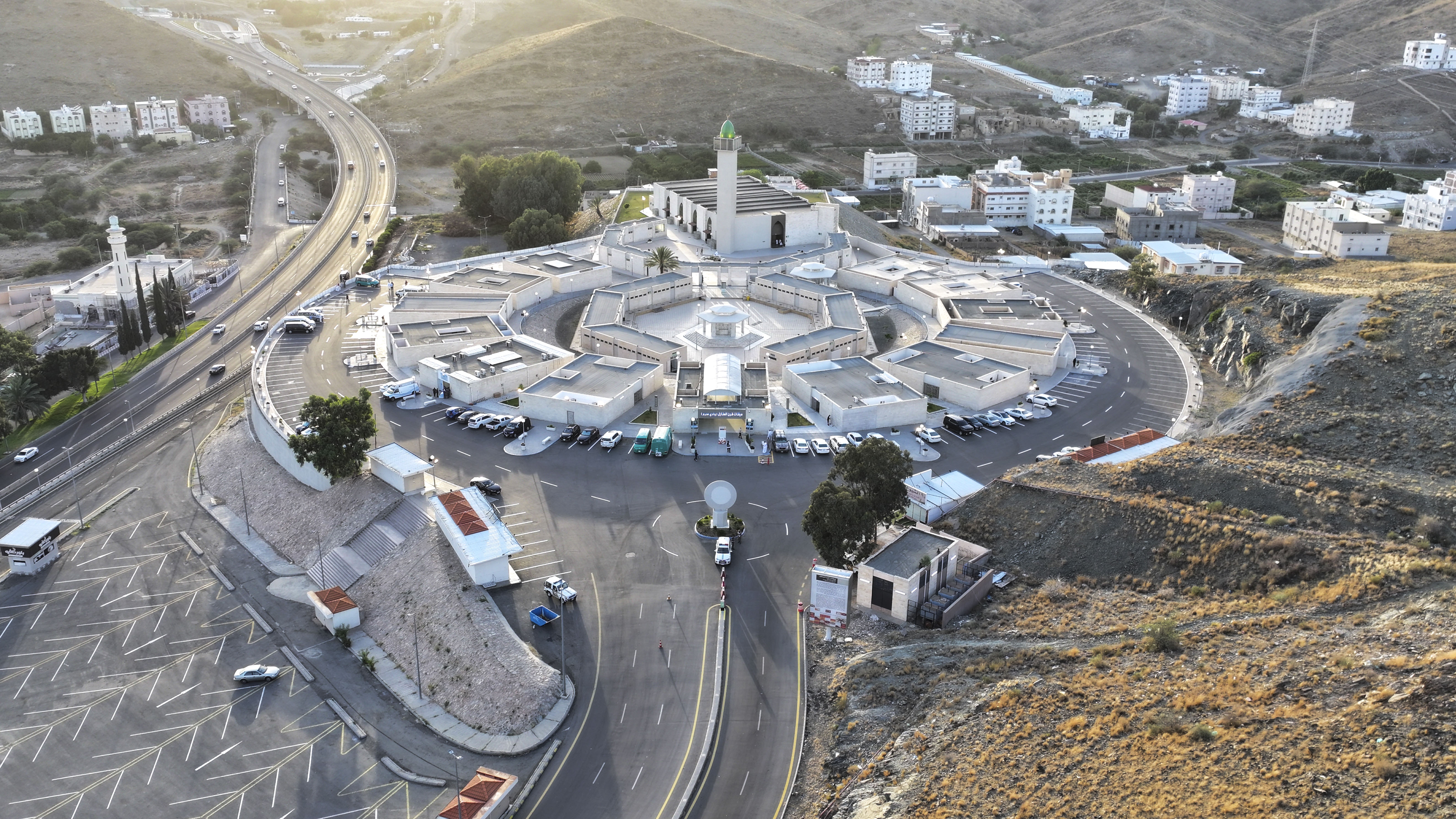
- Miqat Wadi Muharram in 2025

Religion
- Affiliation: Islam
- Province: Hejaz (Makkah and Al-Madinah)
- Rite: Ihram

Location
- Country: Saudi Arabia

Website
- www.hajinformation.com/main/e101.htm

The miqat (Arabic: مِيْقَات, romanized: mīqāt, lit. 'a stated place') is a principal boundary at which Muslim pilgrims intending to perform the Hajj or Umrah must enter the state of ihram (lit. 'prohibition'), a state of consecration in which certain permitted (and prohibited) activities are made prohibited.

There are five mawāqīt (مَوَاقِيْت). Four of these were defined by the Islamic prophet Muhammad. One was defined by the second Rashidun caliph, Umar ibn Al-Khattab, to fulfill the needs of pilgrims from the newly annexed regions in Mesopotamia and Persia.

== List ==
The mawāqīt are as follows:

Name	Location	Distance from Mecca	Defined by	Serves pilgrims arriving from	Image
Qarn al-Manazil	As-Sayl al-Kabir	82 kilometres (51 miles) NE	Muhammad	Najd	
Yalamlam / As-Saʿdiyyah	Road 4347, north of Al Lith	105 kilometres (65 miles) SE	Muhammad	Yemen	
Dhat Irq	Road 4281 near As-Sayl al-Kabir	110 kilometres (68 miles) NE	Umar ibn Al-Khattab	Iran and Iraq	
Al-Juhfah	Rabigh	179 kilometres (111 miles) NW	Muhammad	Ash-Shām (Syria, Palestine, Jordan, etc.)	
Masjid ash-Shajarah	Dhul-Hulayfah	424 kilometres (263 miles) N	Muhammad	Medina	

If a pilgrim intends to perform an additional Umrah, then ihram must be assumed outside the boundary of the haram area before re-entering Mecca to carry out the rites of Umrah. Many pilgrims choose to enter into the state of ihram at Masjid 'Aisha, which is the nearest and most convenient location from Al-Masjid Al-Haram. The condition to perform Umrah from this miqat is that one should be a resident of Mecca, and/or have already performed Umrah once and is wishing to do this again – in which case, this is valid point of miqat. Transportation to get to this location is readily available near the mosque. Additional Umrah, if a person so intends, can also be done by assuming ihram at any of the five main miqats.

== Scholarly opinion on entering ihram in the air ==
Islamic scholarly opinion on how to enter ihram while flying in for the Hajj or Umrah slightly differs between ulama. Most interpret the Hadith 14 in Book 25 of Sahih al-Bukhari, which was narrated by 'Abdullah ibn 'Abbas, as meaning it is necessary to wear and assume ihram when leaving one's home. Others see wearing one's ihram before one's plane enters the miqat zone to be permissible too. A line drawn from the southernmost miqat at Yalamlam to the northwestern miqat at Juhfah puts Jeddah in the zone. Conventionally, pilots carrying pilgrims announce entering the miqat about 30 minutes prior, so that pilgrims can go to the lavatory and change.

Allah's Messenger (ﷺ) had fixed Dhul Hulaifa as the Miqat for the people of Medina; Al-Juhfa for the people of Sham; and Qarn Ul-Manazil for the people of Najd; and Yalamlam for the people of Yemen. So, these (above mentioned) are the Mawaqit for all those living at those places, and besides them for those who come through those places with the intention of performing Hajj and `Umra [sic] and whoever lives within these places should assume Ihram from his dwelling place, and similarly the people of Mecca can assume lhram from Mecca.

== Al-Ḥaram ==
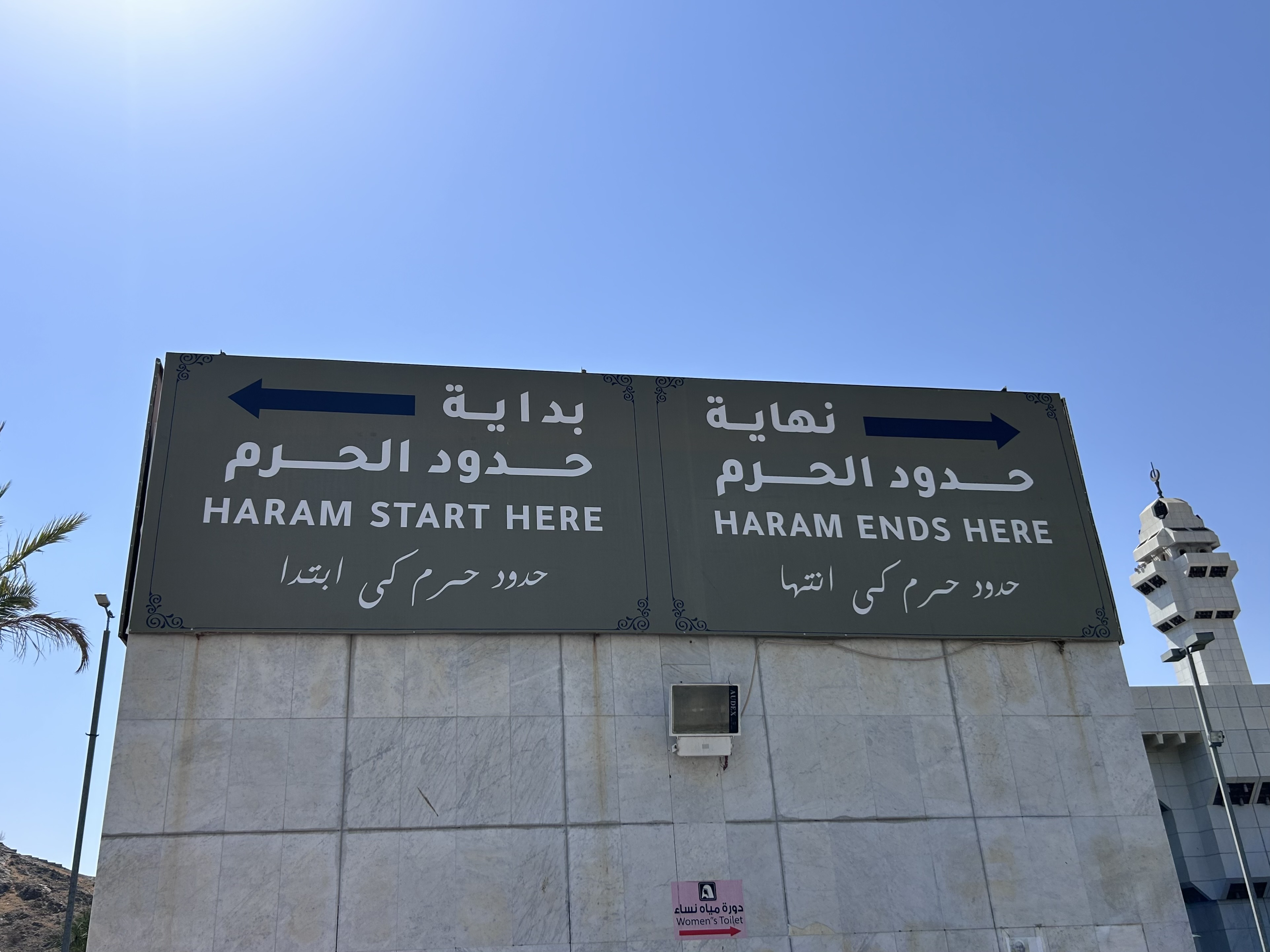
Boundaries of the haram at Masjid Ayesha

The haram is the sacred precinct of Mecca within which certain acts are considered unlawful which may be lawful elsewhere. It is prohibited to hunt wild animals, damage any plant or tree, graze animals, carry weapons, fight, or behave in a manner that will violate the sanctity of Al-Masjid Al-Ḥarām. If a violation is carried out within the precinct of the haram, a penalty (Arabic: دَمّ, romanized: damm) or gift of charity (ṣadaqah) is required as expiation. The boundaries of the haram are the following:

1. Masjid ʿĀʾishah, also known as Masjid at-Tanʿīm, located about 8 kilometres (5.0 mi) from the Kaaba and 5 kilometres (3.1 mi) away from Mecca, in the direction of Madinah.
2. Aḍāt Laban (أَضَاة لَبَن) or Aḍāt Libn (أَضَاة لِبْن) – On the road to Yemen, 11 kilometres (6.8 mi) away from Mecca.
3. Wādī Nakhlah – On the road to Iraq, 11 kilometres (6.8 mi) away from Mecca.
4. 'Arafat – On the road to Ta'if, close to Masjid al-Namirah in Arafat, 11 kilometres (6.8 mi) away from Mecca.
5. Masjid al-Jiʿrānah (مَسْجِد ٱلْجِعْرَانَة), located about 14 kilometres (8.7 mi) away from Mecca.
6. Masjid al-Ḥudaibiyah (مَسْجِد ٱلْحُدَيْبِيَة), on the road to Jeddah, about 16 kilometres (9.9 mi) away from Mecca.

== See also ==
- Middle East
  - Arabian Peninsula
  - Holiest sites in Islam
