= Ministry of Hajj and Umrah =

Government ministry of Saudi Arabia

- وزارة الحج والعمرة

Agency overview
- Formed: 7 May 2016; 10 years ago
- Preceding agencies: Hajj Administration (1926–1933); Supreme Hajj Committee (1933–1946); Directorate General of Hajj and the Two Holy Mosques Affairs (1946–1954); Directorate General of Hajj and Islamic Endowments (1954–1962); Ministry of Hajj and Endowments (1962–1993); Ministry of Hajj (1993–2016)
- Jurisdiction: Government of Saudi Arabia
- Headquarters: Mecca
- Minister responsible: Tawfig Al-Rabiah
- Website: haj.gov.sa

The Ministry of Hajj and Umrah (Arabic: وزارة الحج و العمرة) is a government ministry in Saudi Arabia responsible for organizing Hajj, Umrah, and visitation affairs, facilitating services for pilgrims, and coordinating with sectors involved in the journeys to Mecca and Medina.

== Strategic initiatives ==
The ministry has launched initiatives connected with Saudi Arabia's pilgrimage-management and digital-transformation programmes. In 2016, Saudi Arabia introduced an electronic bracelet programme for Hajj pilgrims, intended to store pilgrim information and support identification and assistance during the pilgrimage.

In 2019, more than 4.1 million Umrah visas were issued. In June 2020, during the COVID-19 pandemic, the ministry announced that Hajj would be limited to 10,000 pilgrims as part of public-health measures.

=== Nusuk ===
The ministry launched Nusuk on 26 September 2022 as a digital platform and mobile application for pilgrims and visitors travelling to Mecca and Medina. The launch followed the earlier Eatmarna application, whose services included registration for Umrah and Hajj performers and permits for visits to Al-Rawdah Al-Sharifah.

Nusuk is used for services related to Hajj, Umrah and visits to Islamic holy sites in Saudi Arabia, including Umrah permits, bookings for visits to Al-Rawdah Al-Sharifah, support services and pilgrimage planning tools. Later service channels include Nusuk Hajj, for Hajj registration and package booking in eligible countries, and Nusuk Umrah, for international Umrah visa applications and related travel services. By March 2026, the platform had more than 51 million users worldwide.

== Grand Hajj Symposium ==
The Grand Hajj Symposium is an annual scientific and cultural meeting organized by the Ministry of Hajj and Umrah during the Hajj season. The ministry describes it as a platform for scholars and specialists to discuss issues related to Hajj, pilgrims and the wider Islamic community. The symposium has been held since 1397 AH, corresponding to 1977 AD.

== See also ==
- Ministries of Saudi Arabia
