= Umrah =

Islamic pilgrimage to Mecca

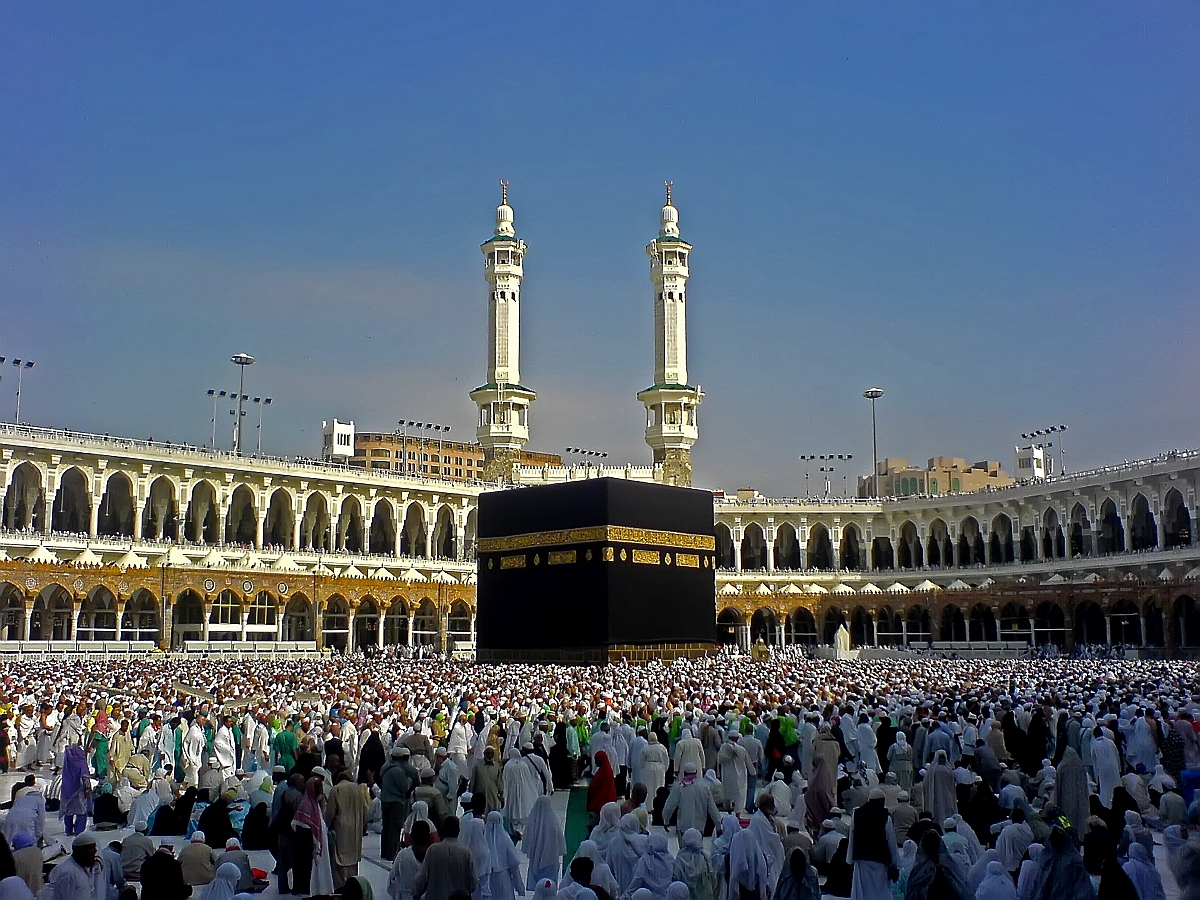
Pilgrims circumambulating the Kaaba in Mecca

The Umrah (Arabic: عُمْرَة, lit. 'to visit a populated place') is an Islamic pilgrimage to Mecca, the holiest city for Muslims, located in the Hejazi region of Saudi Arabia. It can be undertaken at any time of the year, in contrast to the Ḥajj (/hædʒ/, lit. 'pilgrimage'), which can be undertaken only during specific dates, per the Islamic lunar calendar. However, during the Hajj season (Dhu al-Hijjah), only those undertaking the Hajj are permitted to perform the Umrah, according to regulations set by the Saudi government to manage crowd sizes and to ensure safety.

== Rites and rituals ==
In accordance to Islam for both pilgrimages, a Muslim must first assume Ihram, a state of purification achieved by completing cleansing rituals, wearing the prescribed attire, and abstaining from certain actions. This must be attained when reaching a Miqat, a principal boundary point on the way to Mecca, like Dhu 'l-Hulaifah, Juhfah, Qarnu 'l-Manāzil, Yalamlam, Zāt-i-'Irq, Ibrahīm Mursīyah, or a place in Al-Hill. Different conditions exist for air travelers, who must observe Ihram once entering a specific perimeter in the city.

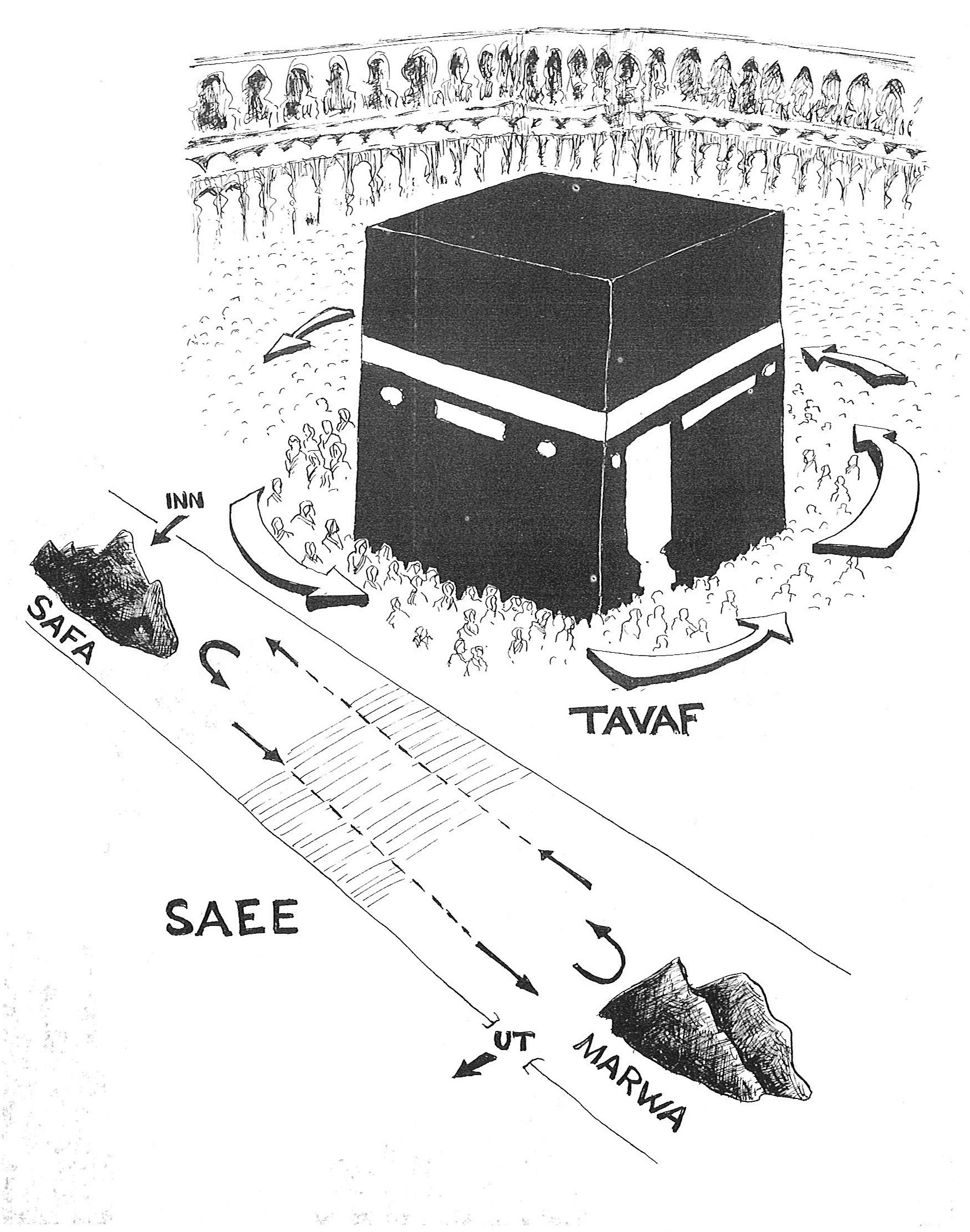
Tawaf and Sa'i

Umrah requires Muslims to perform two key rituals, Tawaf and Sa'i. Tawaf is a circling round the Kaaba seven times. This is followed by Sa'i, a walk between the hillocks of Safa and Marwah in the Great Mosque of Mecca to commemorate Hagar (Hājar)'s search for water for her son, Ishmael (Ismāʿīl), and God's mercy in answering her prayers. Pilgrims conclude the pilgrimage with Halq, a partial or complete shortening of the hair.

Umrah is sometimes considered the "lesser pilgrimage", in that it is not compulsory in all Islam schools of thought, but is still highly recommended. It is mandatory according to the Hanbalis and also according to the Shafi'is. It is generally able to be completed in a few hours, in comparison to Ḥajj, which may take a few days. It is also not meant to be interpreted as a substitute for Hajj. However, both are demonstrations of the solidarity of the Muslim people, and their submission to Allah (God).

== History ==
According to the Muslim traditional accounts, access to the Holy Site (and thus the right to practice the Hajj and Umrah pilgrimages) has not always been granted to Muslims. It is reported in the Muslim traditional accounts that throughout Muhammad's era, the Muslims wanted to establish the right to perform Umrah and Hajj to Mecca since the latter had been prescribed by the Quran. During that time, Mecca was occupied by Arab Pagans who used to worship idols inside Mecca.

=== The Treaty of Hudaibiya ===
In the early years of the Islamic Ummah, it is claimed that tensions arose in Mecca between its pagan inhabitants and the Muslims who wished to perform pilgrimages within. According to the traditional Muslim stories, in 628 CE (6 A.H.), inspired by a dream that Muhammad had while in Madinah, in which he was performing the ceremonies of Umrah, he and his followers approached Mecca from Medina. They were stopped at Hudaibiya, Quraysh (a local tribe to which Muhammad belonged) refused entry to the Muslims who wished to perform the pilgrimage. Muhammad is said to have explained that they only wished to perform a pilgrimage, and subsequently leave the city, however the Qurayshites disagreed.

Diplomatic negotiations were pursued once the Islamic prophet Muhammad refused to use force to enter Mecca, out of respect to the Holy Ka'aba. In March, 628 CE (Dhu'l-Qi'dah, 6 A.H.), the Treaty of Hudaybiyyah was drawn up and signed, with terms stipulating a ten-year period free of hostilities, during which the Muslims would be allowed a three-day-long access per year to the holy site of the Ka'aba starting the following year. On the year it was signed, the followers of Mohammed were forced to return home without having performed Umrah.

=== The First Umrah ===
The next year, the Muslim tradition claims that Muhammad ordered and took part in the Conquest of Mecca in December 629. Following the agreed-upon terms of the Hudaibiya Treaty, Muhammad and some 2000 followers (men, women and children) proceeded to perform what became the first Umrah, which lasted three days. After the transfer of power, the people of Mecca who (according to the Muslim traditional narrative) had persecuted and driven away the early Muslims, and had fought against the Muslims due to their beliefs, were afraid of retribution. However, Muhammad forgave all of his former enemies.

Ten people were forgiven, and not to be killed after the capture of Mecca: Ikrimah ibn Abi-Jahl, Abdullah ibn Saad ibn Abi Sarh, Habbar bin Aswad, Miqyas Subabah Laythi, Huwairath bin Nuqayd, Abdullah Hilal and four women who had been guilty of murder or other offences or had sparked off the war and disrupted the peace.

=== COVID-19 closures ===
On 26 February 2020, Saudi Arabia suspended travel to the country for reasons related to the Umrah, due to concerns over the rapid spread of COVID-19. After the reporting of the first case of COVID-19 in Saudi Arabia, on 4 March 2020, the Riyadh government banned Umrah pilgrimage to the holy cities of Medina and Mecca for Saudi citizens, foreign visitors, and residents living in the kingdom. On 10 August 2021, Umrah for pilgrims coming from around the world was resumed.

== Administration and digital services ==
The Ministry of Hajj and Umrah launched Nusuk in 2022 as the replacement for the Eatmarna application, with services for Umrah permits, visit and Umrah visas, and bookings related to visits to the Prophet's Mosque. In 2025, the ministry launched Nusuk Umrah, allowing pilgrims from abroad to apply directly for an Umrah visa and book related services online; accredited local agents remained available through the Nusuk Umrah system.

== See also ==
- Arabian Peninsula
- List of expeditions of Muhammad
- Umrah visa policy
