= Hajj =

Islamic pilgrimage to Mecca

Hajj حَجّ
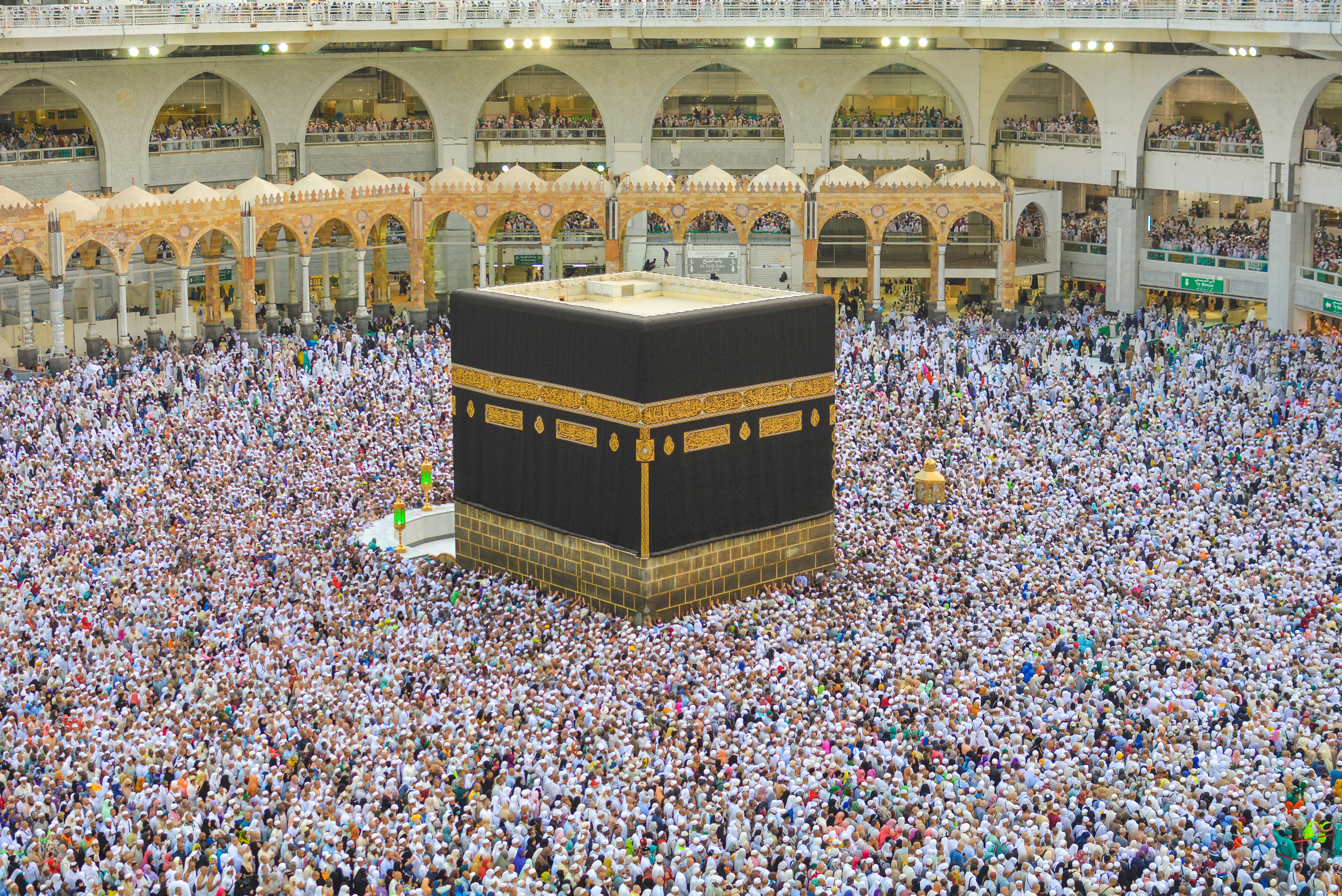
- Pilgrims at the Masjid al-Haram performing Tawaf during Hajj
- Status: Active
- Genre: Religious pilgrimage
- Begins: 8th day of Dhu'l-Hijja
- Ends: 12th or 13th day of Dhu'l-Hijja
- Frequency: Annual
- Location: Mecca
- Coordinates: 21°25′22.3″N 39°49′32.6″E
- Country: Saudi Arabia
- Founder: Abraham (traditional); Muhammad (current form)
- Participants: Muslims
- Attendance: 1,707,301 (2026)
- Organiser: Ministry of Hajj and Umrah

Hajj (Arabic: حَجّ, romanized: Ḥajj [ħaddʒ]; also spelled Hadj or Haj) (Note: /hɑːdʒ, hædʒ/) is an annual Islamic pilgrimage to Mecca, Saudi Arabia, the holiest city in Islam. Hajj is a one-time-required religious duty for all Muslims who are physically and financially capable of undertaking the journey and supporting their family during their absence from home.

In Islamic terminology, Hajj is a pilgrimage made to the Kaaba—the "House of Allah"—in the sacred city of Mecca. It is one of the Five Pillars of Islam, alongside the Shahadah (oath that one believes there is no god but Allah and Muhammad is the Messenger of Allah), salah (prayer), zakah (almsgiving), and sawm (fasting during Ramadan). The Hajj is an annual practice when Muslim brotherhood is on display and their solidarity with fellow Muslims and submission to God (Allah) is fulfilled. The Hajj is taken by Muslims to cleanse their souls of all worldly sins, which connotes both the outward act of a journey after death and the inward act of good intentions. The rites of pilgrimage are performed over five to six days, extending from the 8th to the 12th or 13th of Dhu'l-Hijja, the last month of the Islamic calendar. Because the Islamic calendar is lunar and the Islamic year is about eleven or twelve days shorter than the Gregorian year, the Gregorian date of Hajj changes from year to year. In 2024 AD (1445 AH), Dhu'l-Hijja extended from 7 June to 6 July and in 2025 AD (1446 AH), Dhu'l-Hijja was from 28 May to 25 June. In 2026 AD (1447 AH), Dhu'l-Hijja extended from 18 May to 15 June; and in 2027 AD (1448 AH), Dhu'l-Hijja will extend from 8 May to 5 June.

The Hajj is associated with the life of the Islamic prophet Muhammad from the 7th century AD, but the ritual of pilgrimage to Mecca stated in Muslim sources stretches back to the time of Abraham. During Hajj, pilgrims join processions of millions of Muslims, who simultaneously converge on Mecca for the week of the Hajj, and perform a series of pre-Islamic rituals (reformed by Muhammad): each person wears a single piece of unstitched white clothing (Ihram), walks counter-clockwise seven times around the Kaaba (Stone-made clothed building which is the direction of prayer for Muslims), kisses the Black Stone mounted on the corner wall of the Kaaba, walks briskly back and forth between the hills of Safa and Marwah seven times, then drinks from the Zamzam Well, goes to the plains of Mount Arafat to stand in vigil, spends a night in the plain of Muzdalifah, and performs symbolic Stoning of the Devil by throwing stones at three pillars. After the sacrifice of cattle (which can be accomplished by using a voucher), the pilgrims then are required to either shave or trim their heads (if male) or trim the ends of their hair (if female). A celebration of the four-day global festival of Eid al-Adha follows. Muslims may also undertake an Umrah (Arabic: عُمرَة), or "lesser pilgrimage" to Mecca at other times of the year. However, the Umrah is not a substitute for the Hajj and Muslims are still obliged to perform the Hajj at some other point in their lifetime if they have the means to do so.

According to the official published statistics between 2000 and 2019, the average number of attendees is 2,269,145 per year, of whom 1,564,710 come from outside Saudi Arabia and 671,983 are domestic pilgrims. The year 2012 marks the highest number of participants with 3,161,573. In June 2020, while not cancelling the Hajj outright, the Saudi Government announced that they would only welcome "very limited numbers" of pilgrims who are residents of Saudi Arabia due to the global COVID-19 pandemic. Similar restrictions applied in 2021, but women were permitted to attend without a male guardian (mahram) provided they went in a trustworthy group.

== Etymology ==
The word in Arabic: حج ḥajj is similar to the Hebrew: חג ḥag, which means "festival", from the triliteral Semitic root ح-ج-ج. The term was used to refer to the three pilgrimage festivals Israelites would make to the Temple in Jerusalem each year. Similarly, the Arabic: حج ḥajj in Islam refers to act of traveling to Mecca to perform the various rituals associated with the pilgrimage.

== History ==
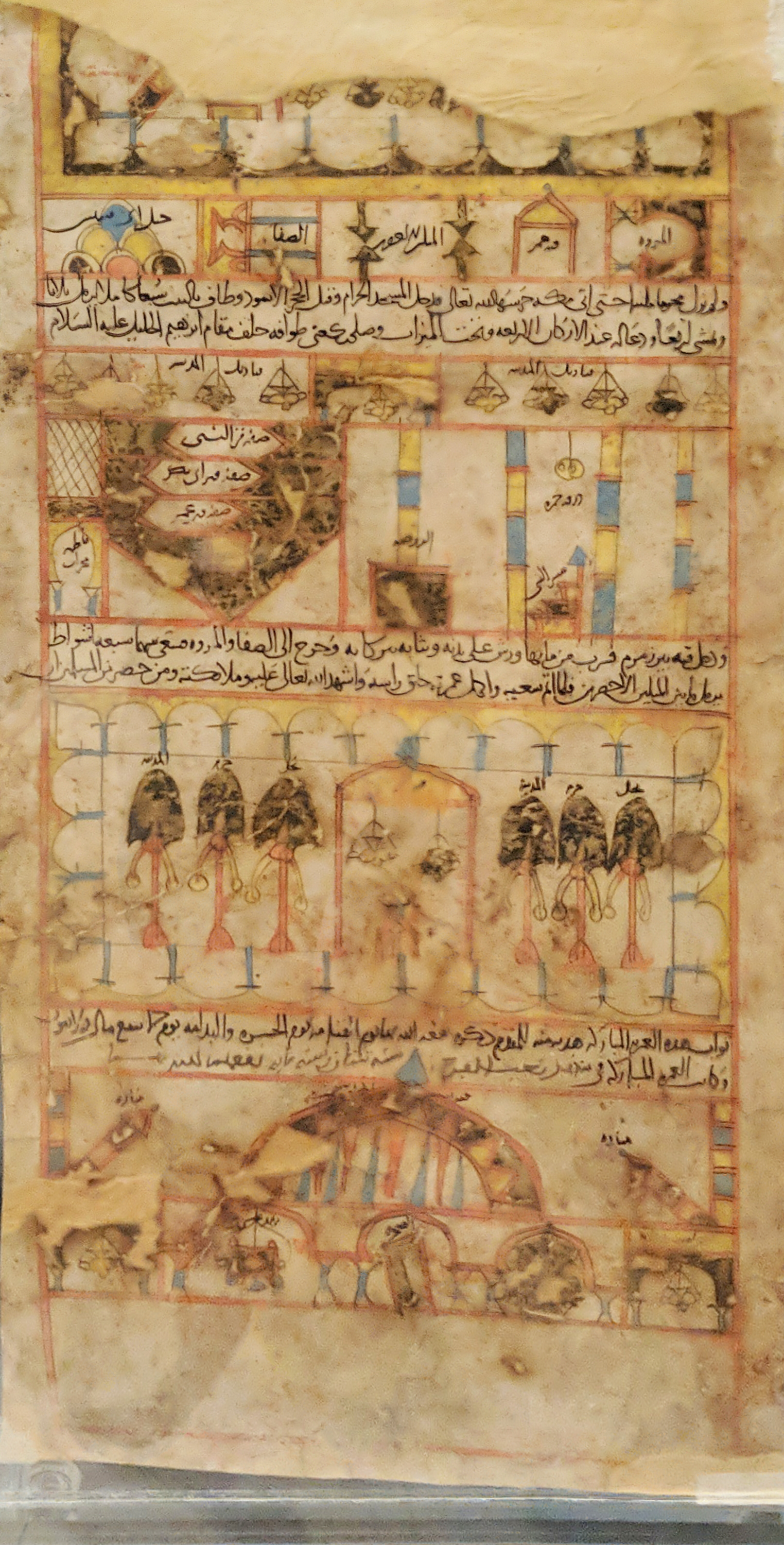
A Hajj certificate dated 602 AH (1205 CE).

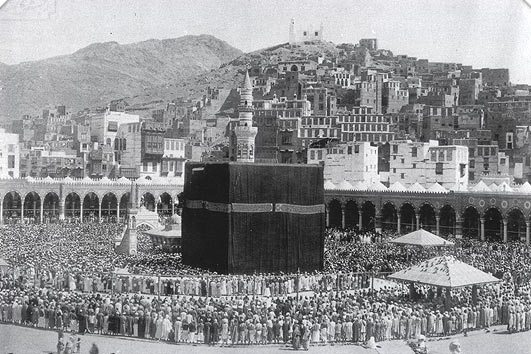
A 1907 photograph of people praying near the Kaaba in the Great Mosque of Mecca

The Kaaba during Hajj

The present pattern of Hajj was established by Muhammad. However, according to the Quran, elements of Hajj trace back to the time of Abraham. According to Islamic tradition, Abraham was ordered by God to leave his wife Hajar and his son Ishmael alone in the desert of ancient Mecca. In search of water, Hajar desperately ran seven times between the two hills of Safa and Marwah but found none. Returning in despair to Ishmael, she saw the baby scratching the ground with his leg and a water fountain sprang forth underneath his foot. Later, Abraham was commanded to build the Kaaba (which he did with the help of Ishmael) and to invite people to perform pilgrimage there. The Quran refers to these incidents in verses 2:124–127 and 22:27–30. (Note: The verses read: "And remember that Abraham was tried by his Lord with certain commands, which he fulfilled.... Remember We made the House a place of assembly for men and a place of safety, and take ye the station of Abraham as a place of prayer; and We covenanted with Abraham and Ishmael, that they should sanctify My House for those who compass it round or use it as a retreat, or bow, or prostrate themselves (therein in prayer).... And remember Abraham and Ishmael raised the foundations of the House (2:124–127)" and "And proclaim the Pilgrimage among men: they will come to thee on foot and (mounted) on every kind of camel, through deep and distant mountain highways, that they may witness the benefits (provided) for them, and celebrate the name of Allah, through the Days appointed, over the cattle which He has provided for them (for sacrifice): then eat ye thereof and feed the distressed one, the needy. Then let them complete the rites prescribed for them, perform their vows, and (again) circumambulate the Ancient House." (22:27–29)) According to the tafsir of Zamakhshari (d. 1144 C.E.), the archangel Gabriel brought the Black Stone from Heaven to be attached to the Kaaba when it was built by the Prophet Abraham.

In pre-Islamic Arabia, a time known as Age of Ignorance (Jahiliyya), the Kaaba became surrounded by pagan idols. In AD 630, Muhammad led his followers from Medina to Mecca, cleansed the Kaaba by destroying all the pagan idols, and then consecrated the building to God. In AD 632 (9 Zil Hajj 10 AH = 9 March 632 AD, a Friday), Muhammad performed his first and last pilgrimage with a large number of followers, and instructed them on the rites of Hajj. From this point onward, the Hajj became one of the five pillars of Islam.

During medieval times, pilgrims would gather in the big cities of Syria, Egypt, and Iraq to go to Mecca in groups and caravans comprising tens of thousands of pilgrims, often under state patronage. Hajj caravans, particularly with the advent of the Mamluk Sultanate and its successor, the Ottoman Empire, were escorted by a military force accompanied by physicians under the command of an amir al-hajj. This was done to protect the caravan from Bedouin robbers or natural hazards, (Note: Ibn Jubayr noted the skeletons of the faithful who had died of thirst en route. In the 17th century, a group of Egyptian pilgrims lost over 1,500 people and 900 camels. In 1924 around one-fifth of a group of Syrian pilgrims died and two years later, 12,000 are thought to have died during the journey. [Islam in the World by Malise Ruthven. Granta Publications, 2006. p. 2. ISBN 1-86207-906-4.]) and to ensure that the pilgrims were supplied with the necessary provisions. Muslim travelers like Ibn Jubayr and Ibn Battuta have recorded detailed accounts of Hajj journeys in medieval times. The caravans followed well-established routes called in Arabic darb al-hajj (path of the hajj), literally: "pilgrimage road", which usually followed ancient routes such as the King's Highway. For more see History of the Hajj: Hajj routes.

== Timing of Hajj ==
The date of Hajj is determined by the Islamic calendar (known as the Hijri calendar or AH), which is based on the lunar year. Every year, the events of Hajj take place in a ten-day period, starting on 1 and ending on 10 Dhu'l-Hijja, the twelfth and last month of the Islamic calendar. Among these ten days, the 9th Dhu'l-Hijja is known as Day of Arafah, and this day is called the day of Hajj. Because the Islamic calendar is lunar and the Islamic year is about eleven days shorter than the Gregorian year, the Gregorian date for Hajj changes from year to year. Thus, each year in the Gregorian calendar, the pilgrimage starts eleven days (sometimes ten days) earlier. This makes it possible for the Hajj season to fall twice in one Gregorian year, and it does so every 33 years. The last time this phenomenon occurred was in 2006.

The table below shows the Gregorian dates of Hajj in recent years (the dates correspond to 9 Dhu'l-Hijja of the Hijri calendar). Prospective dates are approximate:

AH	Gregorian date
1432	2011, 5 November
1433	2012, 25 October
1434	2013, 14 October
1435	2014, 3 October
1436	2015, 23 September
1437	2016, 11 September
1438	2017, 31 August
1439	2018, 20 August
1440	2019, 10 August
1441	2020, 30 July
1442	2021, 19 July
1443	2022, 8 July
1444	2023, 27 June
1445	2024, 15 June
1446	2025, 5 June
1447	2026, 26 May
1448	2027, 15 May
1449	2028, 4 May
1450	2029, 23 April

== Rites ==
Diagram of the locations and rites of Hajj

Fiqh literature describes in detail the manners of carrying out the rites of Hajj, and pilgrims generally follow handbooks and expert guides to successfully fulfill the requirements of Hajj. In performing the rites of Hajj, the pilgrims not only follow the model of Muhammad, but also commemorate the events associated with Abraham.

=== Ihram ===
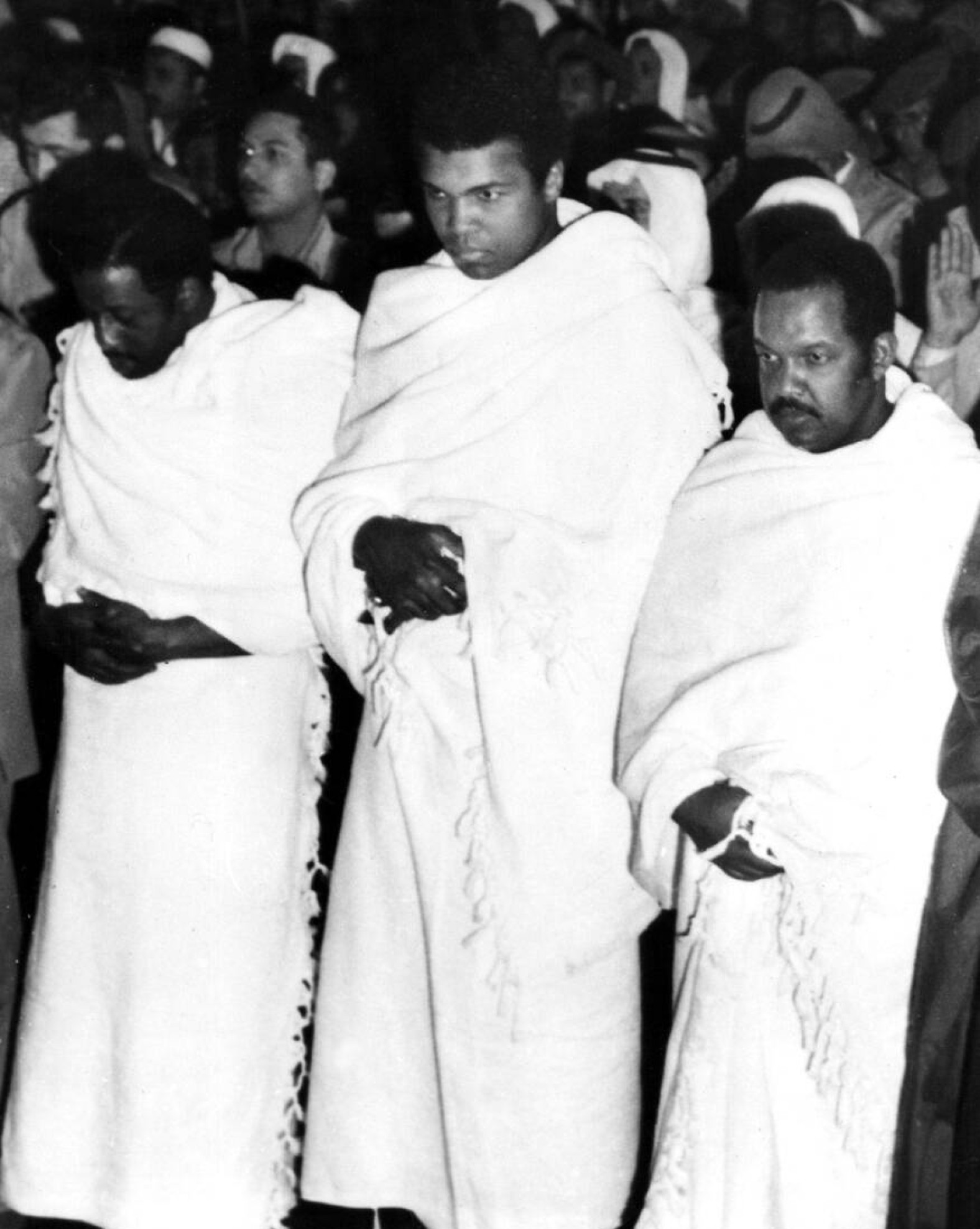
Muhammad Ali wearing the Ihram while performing Hajj in 1972

Ihram is the name given to the special spiritual state, state of holiness, which marks the start of the ritual of Hajj for each person. Ihram is initiated upon the arrival to the Miqat or prior to reaching it, depending on where they have come from.

When pilgrims enter into the state of Ihram, they are required to abstain from certain actions. In Ihram, males are required to wear two white seamless cloths, with one wrapped around the waist reaching below the knee and the other draped over the left shoulder and tied at the right side. For females this involves wearing ordinary dress that fulfills the Islamic condition of public dress, where the hands and face are uncovered. Other prohibitions include refraining from clipping nails, shaving any part of the body, having sexual relations; using perfumes, damaging plants, killing animals, covering the head (for men) or the face and hands (for women); getting married; or carrying weapons.

The Ihram is meant to show equality of all pilgrims in front of God, with no difference between the rich and the poor. Donning such unsewn white garments entirely is believed to distance man from material ostentation, and engross him in a world of purity and spirituality, since clothes are believed to show individuality and distinction and create superficial barriers that separate individuals. The garments of Ihram are seen as the antithesis of that individualism. Ihram clothing is also a reminder of shrouds worn after death.

=== Tawaf and sa'i ===
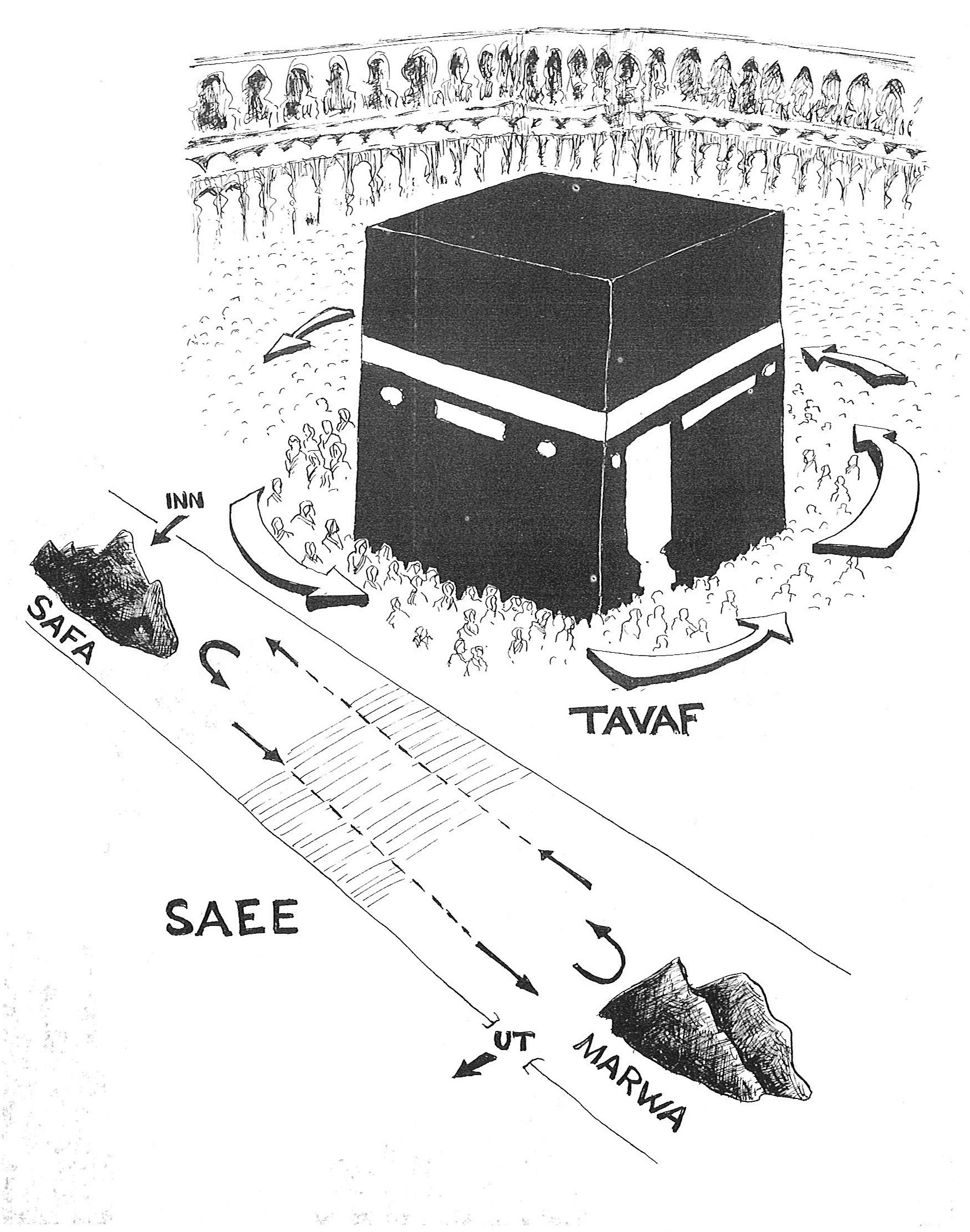
Direction of the tawaf around the Kaaba

The ritual of tawaf involves walking seven times counterclockwise around the Kaaba. Upon arriving at Al-Masjid Al-Ḥarām, pilgrims perform an arrival tawaf either as part of Umrah or as a welcome tawaf. During tawaf, pilgrims also include Hateem – an area at the north side of the Kaaba – inside their path. Each circuit starts and ends with the kissing or touching of the Black Stone. Pilgrims also point to the stone and recite a prayer known as Talbiyah. If kissing or touching the stone is not possible because of crowds, pilgrims may simply point towards the stone with their right hand on each circuit. Eating is not permitted but the drinking of water is permitted and encouraged, because of the risk of dehydration. Men are encouraged to perform the first three circuits at a hurried pace, known as Ramal, and the following four at a more leisurely pace.

The completion of Tawaf is followed by two Rakaat prayers at the Place of Abraham (Muqam Ibrahim), a site near the Kaaba inside the mosque. However, again because of large crowds during the days of Hajj, they may instead pray anywhere in the mosque. After prayer, pilgrims also drink water from the Zamzam well, which is made available in coolers throughout the Mosque.

Although the circuits around the Kaaba are traditionally done on the ground level, tawaf is now also performed on the first floor and roof of the mosque because of the large crowds.

This rite is said to be the manifestation of Tawhid, the Oneness of God. The heart and soul of the pilgrim should move around Kaaba, the symbol of the House of God, in a way that no worldly attraction distracts him from this path. Only Tawhid should attract him. Tawaf also represents Muslims' unity. During tawaf, everyone encircles Kaaba collectively.

Tawaf is followed by sa'i, running or walking seven times between the hills of Safa and Marwah, located near the Kaaba. Previously in the open air, the place is now entirely enclosed by the Sacred Mosque, and can be accessed via air-conditioned tunnels. Pilgrims are advised to walk the circuit, though two green pillars mark a short section of the path where they run. There is also an internal "express lane" for elderly or disabled people. After sa'i, male pilgrims shave or trim their hair and women generally clip a portion of their hair, which completes the Umrah.

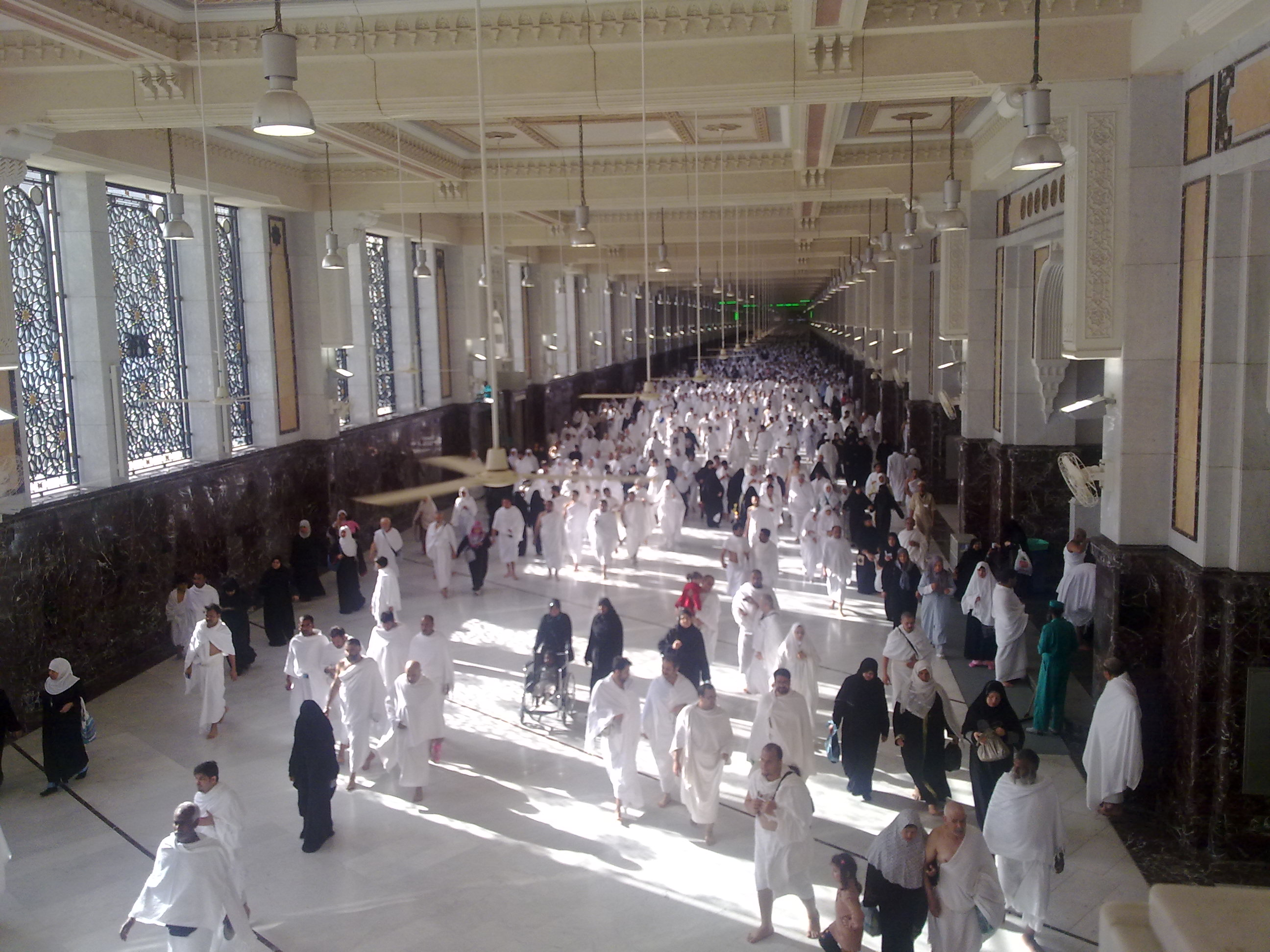
Sa'i towards Safa

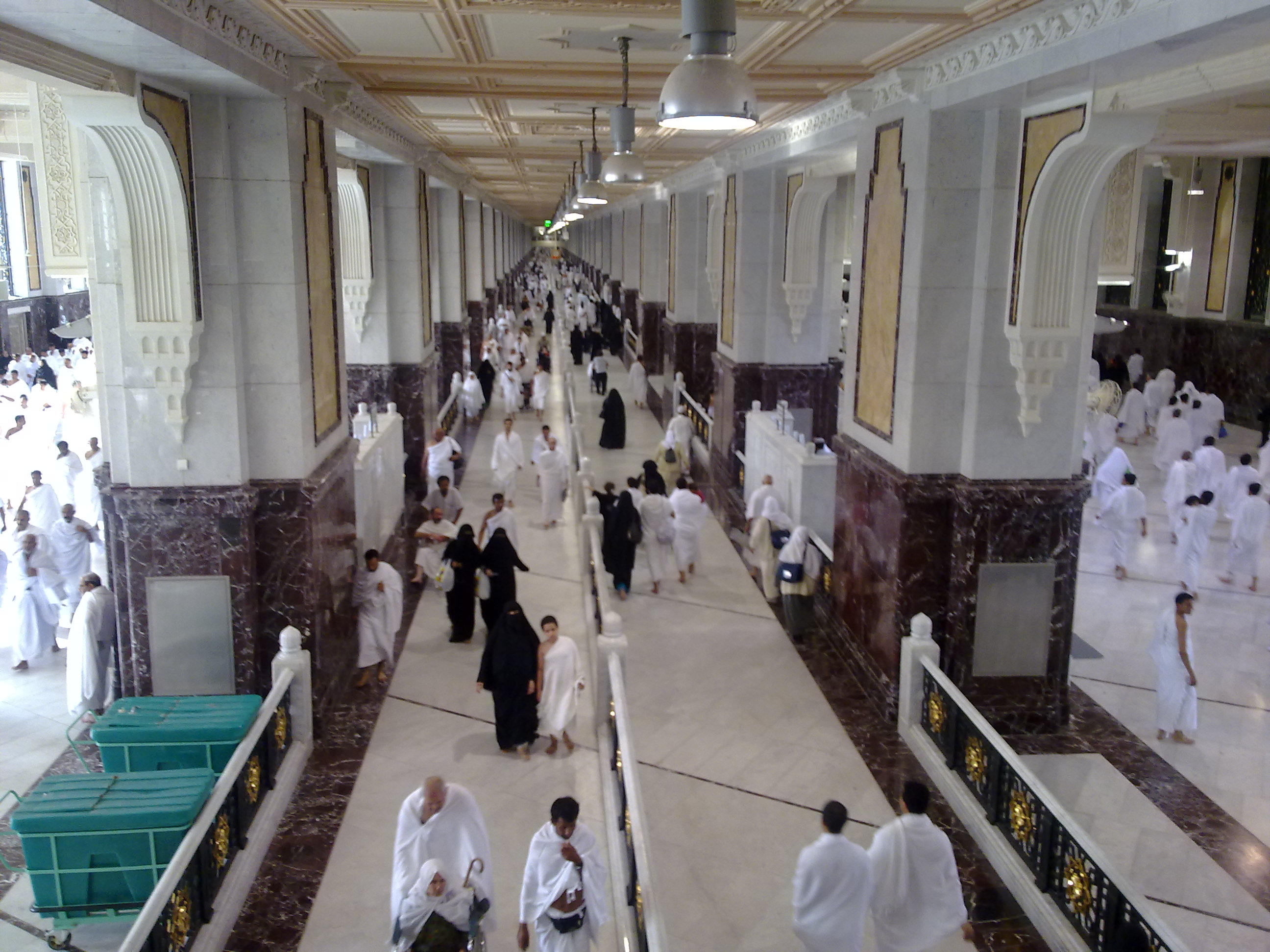
Central section reserved for the elderly and the disabled. It is also divided into two directions of travel.

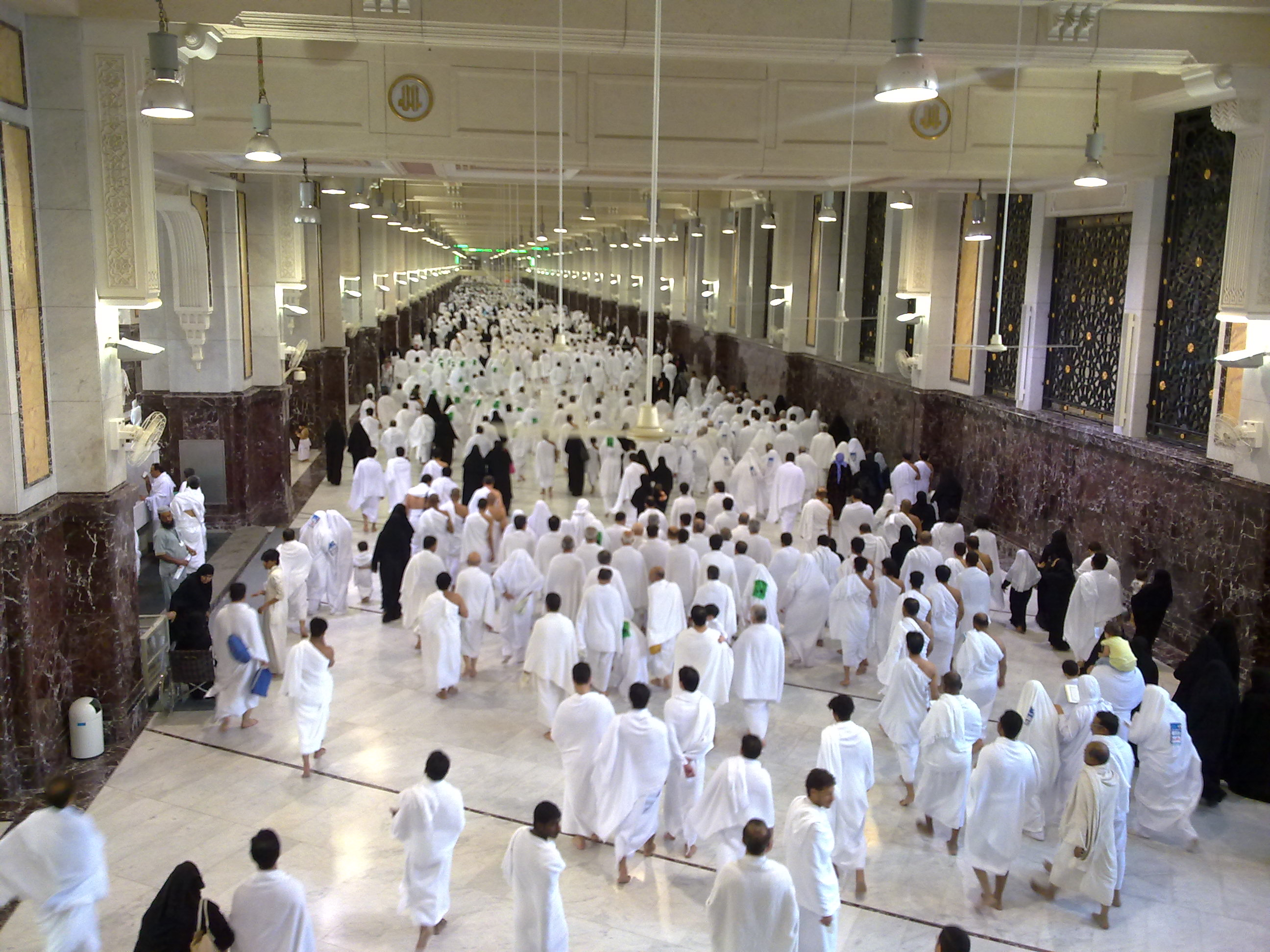
Sa'i returning from Safa

=== First day of Hajj: 8th Dhu'l-Hijja (Tarwiyah Day) ===
On the 8th Dhu'l-Hijja, the pilgrims are reminded of their duties. They again don the Ihram garments and confirm their intention to make the pilgrimage. The prohibitions of Ihram start now.

The name of Tarwiyah refers to a narration of Ja'far al-Sadiq. He described the reason that there was no water at Mount Arafat on the 8th day of Dhu'l-Hijja. If pilgrims wanted to stay at Arafat, they would have prepared water from Mecca and carried it by themselves there. So they told each other to drink enough. Tarwiyah means to quench thirst in the Arabic language. Tarwiyah Day is the first day of Hajj ritual. Also on this day, Husayn ibn Ali began to go to Karbala from Mecca. Muhammad nominated Tarwiyah Day as one of the four chosen days.

==== Mina ====
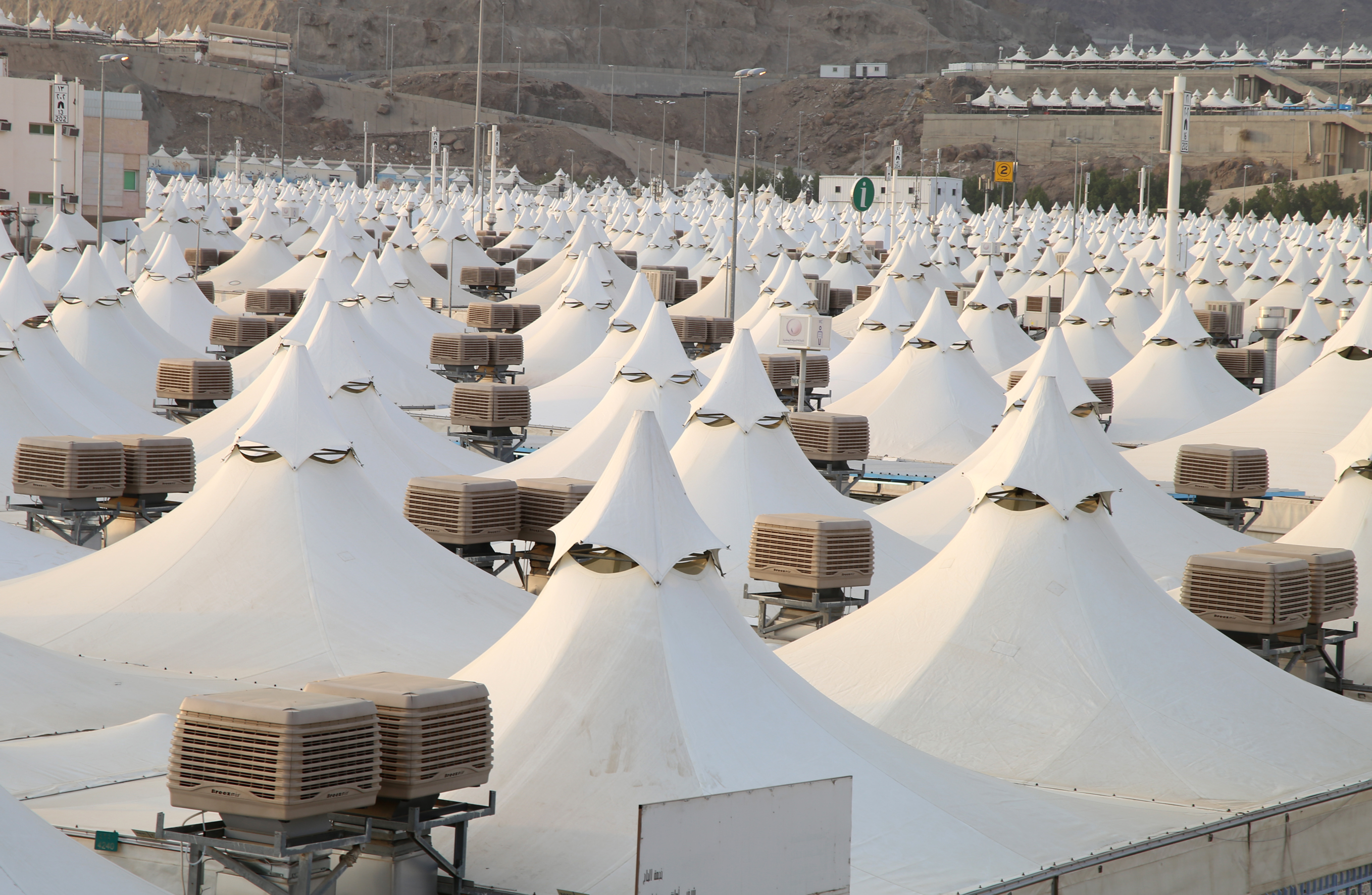
Air-conditioned tents for Hajj pilgrims in Mina, Saudi Arabia, 2 kilometres (1.2 mi) away from Mecca

After the morning prayer on the 8th of Dhu'l-Hijja, the pilgrims proceed to Mina where they spend the whole day and offer noon (Note: On Friday, Friday Prayer is Offered, instead of Dhuhr Prayer, at Mina), afternoon, evening, and night prayers. The next morning after morning prayer, they leave Mina to go to Arafat.

=== Second day: 9th Dhu'l-Hijja (Arafah Day) ===
The 9th Dhu'l-Hijja is known as Day of Arafah, and this day is called the Day of Hajj.

==== Arafat ====
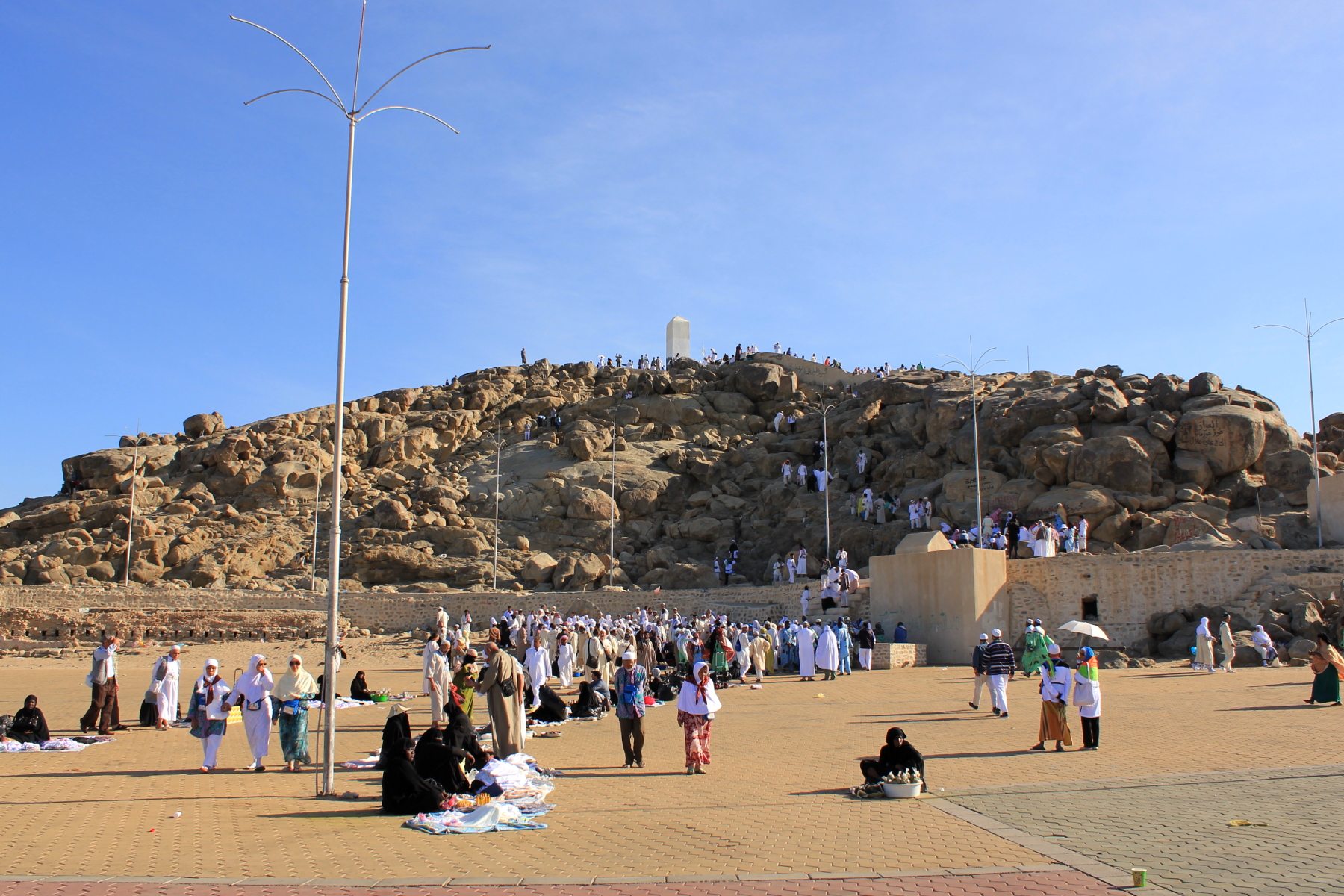
Mount Arafat during Hajj

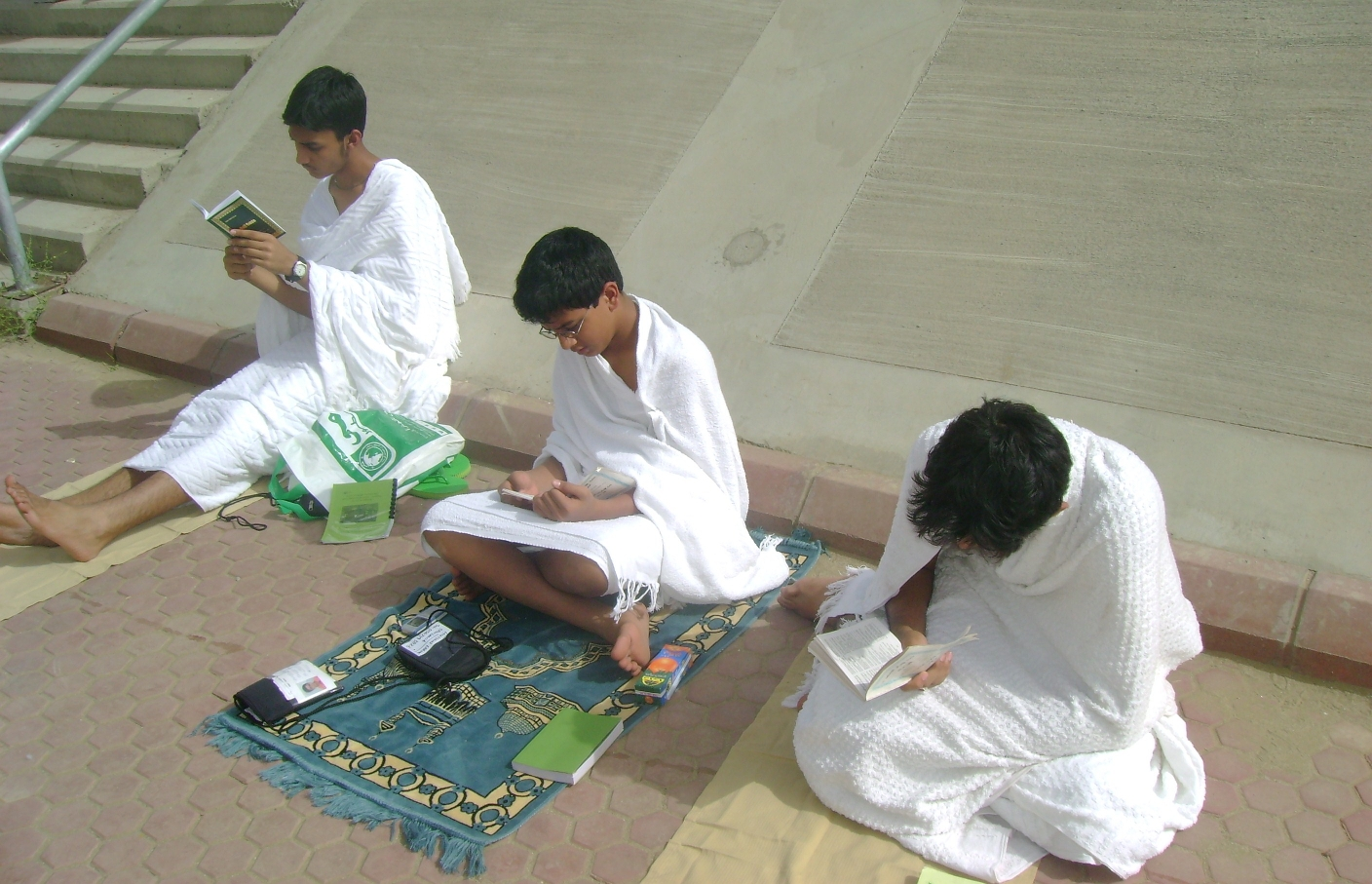
Pilgrims wearing Ihram near Mount Arafat on the day of Hajj

On 9th Dhu'l-Hijja before noon, pilgrims arrive at Arafat, a barren and plain land some 20 kilometres (12 mi) east of Mecca, where they stand in contemplative vigil: they offer supplications, repent on and atone for their past sins, and seek the mercy of God, and listen to the sermon from the Islamic scholars who deliver it from near Jabal al-Rahmah (The Mount of Mercy) from where Muhammad is said to have delivered his last sermon. Lasting from noon through sunset, this is known as 'standing before God' (wuquf), one of the most significant rites of Hajj. At Masjid al-Namirah, pilgrims offer noon and afternoon prayers together at noontime. A pilgrim's Hajj is considered invalid if they do not spend the afternoon on Arafat.

==== Muzdalifah ====
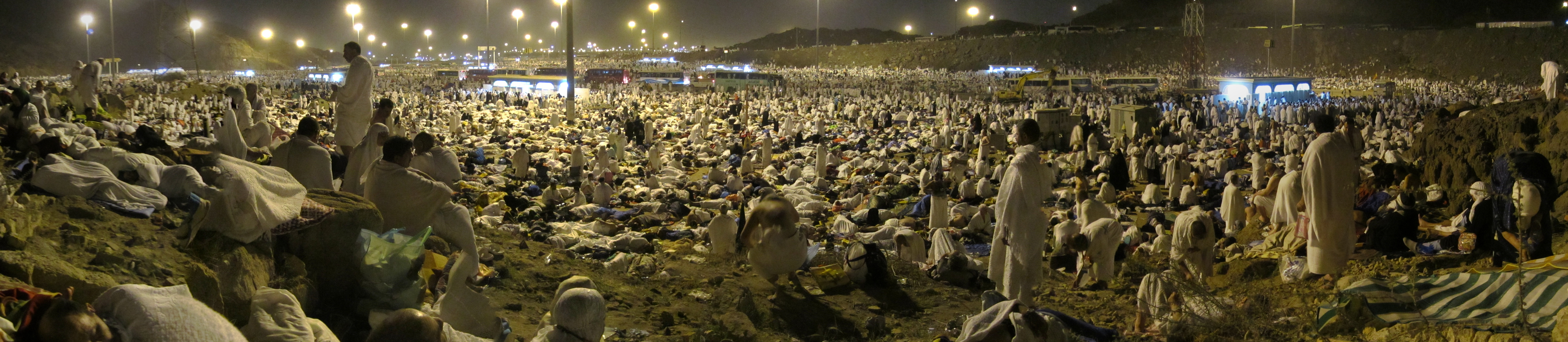
Pilgrims at Muzdalifah

Pilgrims must leave Arafat for Muzdalifah after sunset without performing their Maghrib (Sunset) prayer at Arafat. Muzdalifah is an area between Arafat and Mina. Upon reaching there, pilgrims perform Maghrib and Isha prayer jointly, spend the night praying and sleeping on the ground with open sky, and gather pebbles for the next day's ritual of the stoning of the Devil (Shaytan).

=== Third day: 10th Dhu'l-Hijja (Qurban Day) ===
After the morning prayer, the Pilgrims move from Muzdalifah to Mina.

==== Ramy al-Jamarat ====
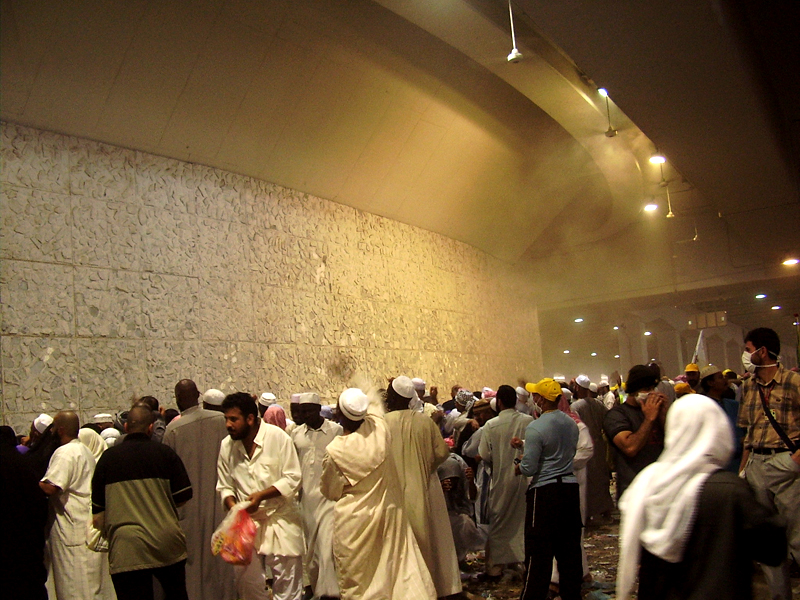
Pilgrims performing "Ramy Al-Jamarat" (Stoning of the Devil) ceremony during the 2006 Hajj

At Mina, the pilgrims perform symbolic Stoning of the Devil (Ramy al-Jamarat) by throwing seven stones from sunrise to sunset at only the largest of the three pillars, known as Jamrat al-Aqabah. The remaining two pillars (jamarah) are not stoned on this day. These pillars are said to represent Satan. Pilgrims climb ramps to the multi-levelled Jamaraat Bridge, from which they can throw their pebbles at the jamarat. Because of safety reasons, in 2004 the pillars were replaced by long walls, with catch basins below to collect the pebbles.

==== Animal sacrificing ====
After the stoning of the Devil, cattle (Surah 22:34-36) are sacrificed to commemorate the story of Ibrahim and Ismael. Traditionally, the pilgrims slaughtered the animal themselves or oversaw the slaughtering. Today many pilgrims buy a sacrifice voucher in Mecca before the greater Hajj begins, which allows an animal to be slaughtered in the name of God (Allah) on the 10th, without the pilgrim being physically present. Modern abattoirs complete the processing of the meat, which is then sent as a charity to poor people around the world. At the same time as the sacrifices occur at Mecca, Muslims worldwide perform similar sacrifices, in a three-day global festival called Eid al-Adha.

==== Hair removal ====
After sacrificing an animal, another important rite of Hajj is the shaving or trimming of head hair (known as Halak). All male pilgrims shave their head or trim their hair on the day of Eid al Adha and female pilgrims cut the ends of their hair.

==== Tawaf Ziyarat/Ifadah ====
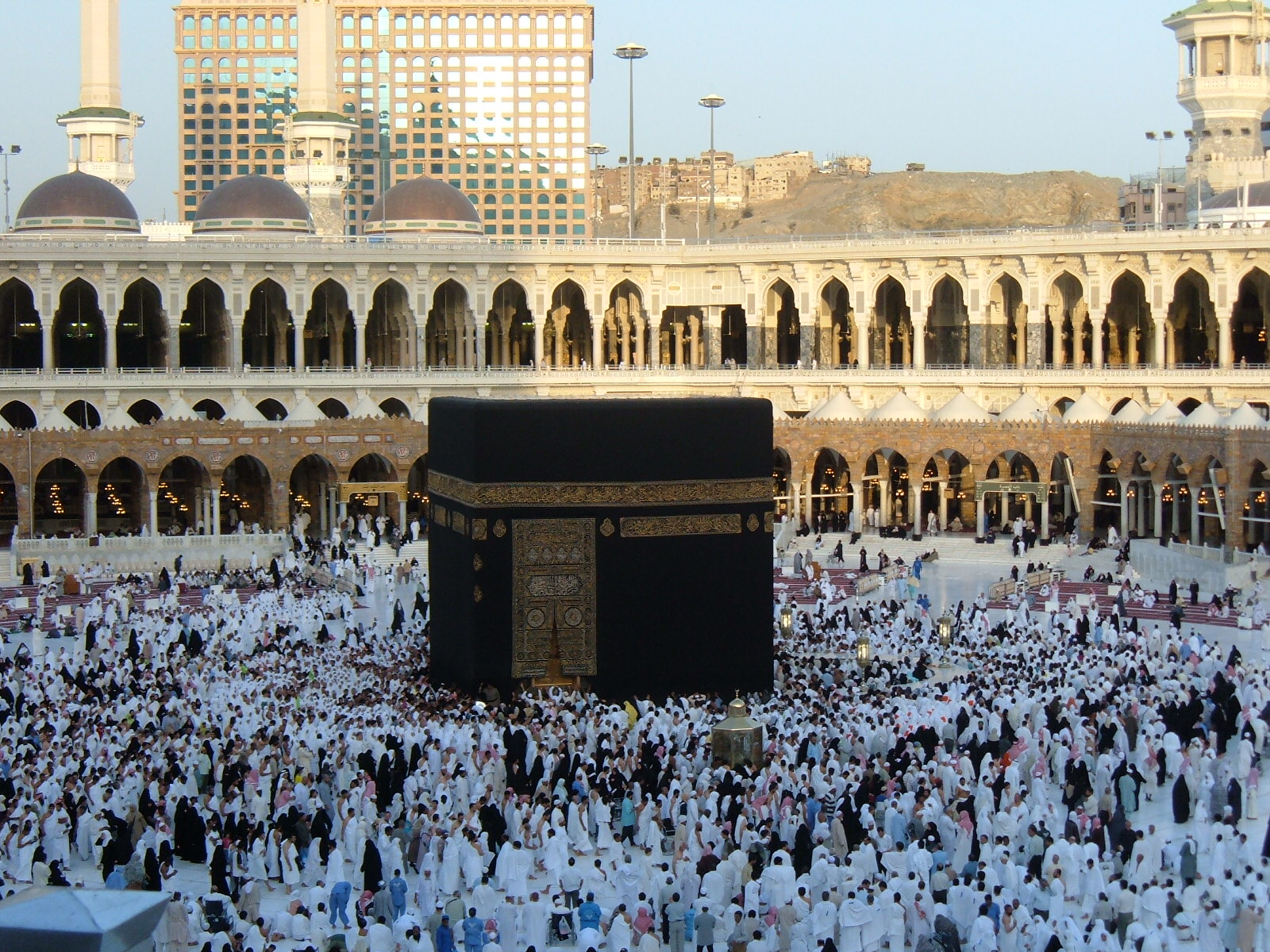
Pilgrims performing Tawaf around the Kaaba

On the same or the following day, the pilgrims re-visit the Sacred Mosque in Mecca for another tawaf, known as Tawaf al-Ifadah, an essential part of Hajj. It symbolizes being in a hurry to respond to God and show love for Him, an obligatory part of Hajj. The night of the 10th is spent back at Mina.

=== Fourth day: 11th Dhu'l-Hijja ===
Starting from noon to sunset on the 11 Dhu'l-Hijja (and again the following day), the pilgrims again throw seven pebbles at each of the three pillars in Mina. This is commonly known as the "Stoning of the Devil".

=== Fifth day: 12th Dhu'l-Hijja ===
On 12 Dhu'l-Hijja, the same process of the stoning of the pillars as of 11 Dhu'l-Hijja takes place. Pilgrims may leave Mina for Mecca before sunset on the 12th.

=== Last day at Mina: 13th Dhu'l-Hijja ===
If unable to leave on the 12th before sunset or opting to stay longer, pilgrims must perform the stoning ritual again on the 13th before returning to Mecca.

==== Tawaf al-Wadaa ====
Finally, before leaving Mecca, pilgrims perform a farewell tawaf called the Tawaf al-Wadaa. 'Wadaa' means 'to bid farewell'. The pilgrims circle the Kaaba seven times counter-clockwise, and if they can, attempt to touch or kiss the Kaaba.

== Journey to Medina ==
During their journey for Hajj, pilgrims traditionally also travel to the city of Medina (approximately 450 kilometres (280 mi) to the northeast), in particular to pray at the Al-Masjid an-Nabawi (Mosque of the Prophet), which contains the tomb of Muhammad. The Quba Mosque and Masjid al-Qiblatayn are also usually visited.

== Significance ==
To Muslims, Hajj is associated with religious as well as social significance. The obligation for performing this pilgrimage is only fulfilled if it is done on the eighth to twelfth day of the last month of the Islamic calendar. If in a given year, an adult Muslim is in good health and their life and wealth are safe, they must perform the Hajj in the same year. Delaying it is considered sinful unless the delay is caused by reasons beyond their control.

Apart from being an obligatory religious duty, the Hajj is seen to have a spiritual merit that provides Muslims with an opportunity of self-renewal. Hajj serves as a reminder of the Day of Judgment when Muslims believe people will stand before God. Hadith literature (sayings of Muhammad) lists various merits a pilgrim achieves upon successful completion of their Hajj. (Note: For example, one such Hadith says Abu Huraira quoted Muhammad as saying: "Whoever performs Hajj for God's pleasure and does not have sexual relations with his wife, and does not do evil or sins then he will return (after Hajj free from all sins) as if he were born anew."Sahih al-Bukhari, 2:26:596) After successful pilgrimage, pilgrims can prefix their names with the title "Al-Hajji", and are held with respect in Muslim society. However, Islamic scholars suggest Hajj should signify a Muslim's religious commitment, and should not be a measurement of their social status. Hajj brings together and unites Muslims from different parts of the world irrespective of their race, colour, and culture, which acts as a symbol of equality.

A 2008 study on the impact of participating in the Islamic pilgrimage found that Muslim communities become more positive and tolerant after Hajj. Titled Estimating the Impact of the Hajj: Religion and Tolerance in Islam's Global Gathering and conducted in conjunction with Harvard University's John F. Kennedy School of Government, the study noted that the Hajj "increases belief in equality and harmony among ethnic groups and Islamic sects and leads to more favourable attitudes toward women, including greater acceptance of female education and employment" and that "Hajjis show increased belief in peace, equality and harmony among adherents of different religions."

Malcolm X, an American activist during the Civil Rights Movement, describes the sociological atmosphere he experienced on Hajj in April 1964 in his autobiography:

There were tens of thousands of pilgrims, from all over the world. They were of all colors, from blue-eyed blondes to black-skinned Africans. But we were all participating in the same ritual, displaying a spirit of unity and brotherhood that my experiences in America had led me to believe never could exist between the white and the non-white. America needs to understand Islam because this is the one religion that erases from its society the race problem. You may be shocked by these words coming from me. But on this pilgrimage, what I have seen, and experienced, has forced me to rearrange much of my thought-patterns previously held.

== Differences between Hajj and Umrah ==
- Both are Islamic pilgrimages; the main difference is their level of importance and the method of observance.
- Hajj is one of the Five Pillars of Islam. It is obligatory for every Muslim once in their lifetime, provided they are physically fit and financially capable.
- Hajj is performed over specific days during a designated Islamic month (Dhu'l-Hijja). However, Umrah can be performed at any time.
- Although they share common rites, Umrah can be performed in less than a few hours while Hajj is more time-consuming, and involves more rituals.

== Arrangement and facilities ==
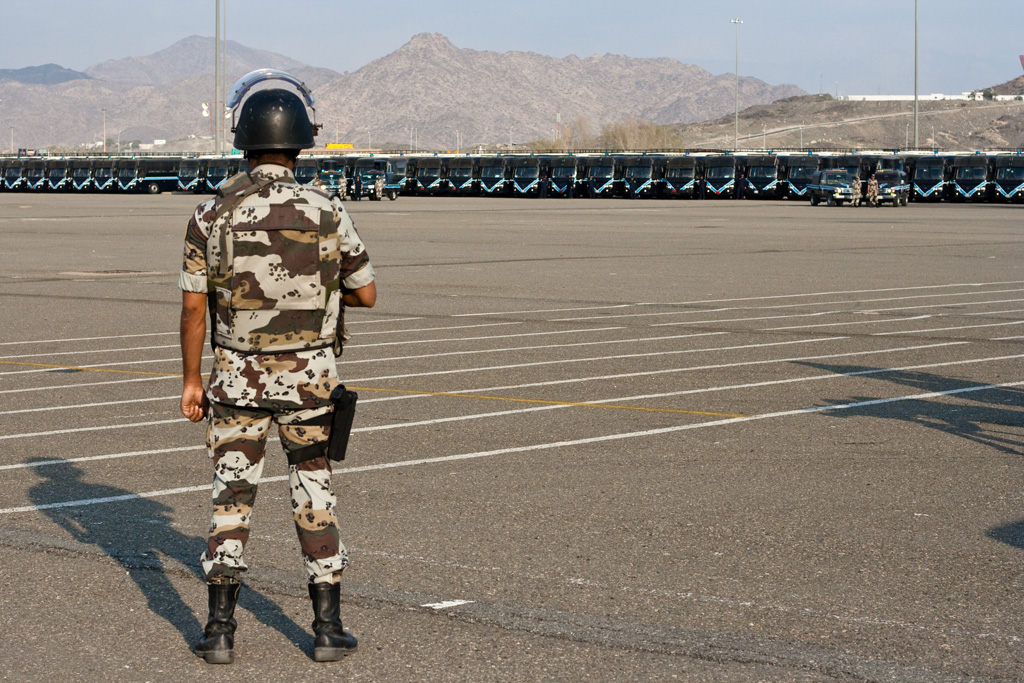
A Saudi security officer on vigil

Most of the Hajj-related issues are handled by the Ministry of Hajj and Umrah. Making necessary arrangements each year for the growing number of pilgrims poses a logistic challenge for the government of Saudi Arabia, which has, since the 1950s, spent more than $100 billion to increase pilgrimage facilities. Major issues like housing, transportation, sanitation, and health care have been addressed and improved greatly by the government by introducing various development programs, with the result that pilgrims now enjoy modern facilities and perform various rites at ease. The Saudi government often sets quotas for various countries to keep the pilgrims' number at a manageable level, and arranges highly extensive security forces and CCTV cameras to maintain overall safety during Hajj. Various institutions and government programs, such as the Haj subsidy offered in Pakistan or the Tabung Haji based in Malaysia assist pilgrims in covering the costs of the journey. For the 2014 Hajj, special Hajj information desks were set up at Pakistani airports to assist the pilgrims. For the benefit of pilgrims from India and Pakistan, Urdu signs were also introduced at the mosques.

=== Technological solutions ===
The Saudi government employs technology to protect the safety, and enhance the experience, of the pilgrim's journey. Recently, the Ministry of Hajj and Umrah has introduced the Hajj pilgrims' e-bracelet program that stores pilgrims' essential data and which helps to provide them with the necessary support. In 2018, SAFCSP organized the Hajj Hackathon event in Jeddah, with 2,950 participants from over 100 countries. The event aims at exploring the use of technology to provide solutions for Hajj pilgrims. In 2019, the "Fatwa Robot" service was launched to provide pilgrims with fatwas and other religious advice. Two interactive apps were launched by Hajj authorities to provide pilgrims with a range of services through their smartphones. The services, which are available in nine languages, help pilgrims in finding emergency service centres, holy sites, currency exchanges, restaurants, and accommodation.

Since 2023, the Ministry of Hajj and Umrah has used Nusuk for parts of Hajj registration and package booking. For the 2023 Hajj season, applicants from Europe, Australia and the Americas were selected through Nusuk, which served applicants from 57 countries and offered Hajj packages and payment options. The platform's Nusuk Hajj channel is overseen by the ministry and lists Hajj packages provided by authorized service providers for pilgrims from serviced countries.

=== Visa requirements ===
To enter Saudi Arabia to participate in the Hajj as a Muslim, visa requirements have to be satisfied. Saudi Arabia's Ministry of Hajj and Umrah is planning to ease visas issuance by enabling Hajj and Umrah pilgrims to obtain e-visa within minutes through campaigns and companies. For the upcoming Umrah season, visas can be electronically issued within 24 hours via a special platform established by the Ministry of Hajj and Umrah. For passengers traveling from the United States, they must purchase a package from a licensed Hajj agency. People from Gulf Cooperation Council countries do not need a visa to enter Saudi Arabia and vice versa. People with Saudi visas are not allowed to enter the site unless they are Muslim.

=== Makkah Route Initiative ===
Makkah Route Initiative is an initiative made by the Saudi government to facilitate pilgrims' entry into Saudi Arabia by completing certain steps in their airport of departure. The initiative has been implemented since 2018 by the Saudi Ministry of Foreign Affairs. In 2019, the initiative is planned to provide service to around 225,000 pilgrims from airports in Malaysia, Indonesia, Pakistan, Bangladesh and Tunisia. The provided services include:

1. Issuance of visas.
2. Making sure that the pilgrims' health conditions comply with the requirements and to make certain that the potential pilgrims have taken preventive measures related to the epidemiological situation in the world.
3. Codifying and sorting luggage at the pilgrims' airports and delivering them to the pilgrims' hotels directly upon arrival.

=== Transportation ===
Traditionally, the pilgrimage to Mecca was mainly an overland journey using camels as a means of transport. During the second half of the nineteenth century (after the 1850s), steamships began to be used in the pilgrimage journey to Mecca, and the number of pilgrims traveling on sea routes increased. This continued for some time, until air travel came to predominate; Egypt introduced the first airline service for Hajj pilgrims in 1937. Today, many airlines and travel agents offer Hajj packages, and arrange for transportation and accommodation for the pilgrims. King Abdulaziz International Airport in Jeddah and Prince Mohammad Bin Abdulaziz Airport in Medina have dedicated pilgrim terminals to assist with the large numbers of pilgrims. Other international airports around the world, such as Indira Gandhi Airport in New Delhi, Rajiv Gandhi International Airport in Hyderabad, Jinnah in Karachi and Soekarno-Hatta in Jakarta also have dedicated terminals or temporary facilities to service pilgrims as they depart for the Hajj and return home. During Hajj, many airlines run extra flights to accommodate the large number of pilgrims.

During official Hajj days, pilgrims travel between the different locations by metro trains, bus or on foot. The Saudi government strictly controls vehicles' access into these heavily congested areas. However, the journey can take many hours due to heavy vehicular and pedestrian traffic. In 2010, the Saudi government started operating the Al Mashaaer Al Mugaddassah Metro line as an exclusive shuttle train for pilgrims between Arafat, Muzdalifa and Mina. The service, which operates only during the days of Hajj, shortens the travel time during the critical "Nafrah" from Arafat to Muzdalifah to minutes. Due to its limited capacity, the use of the metro is not open to all pilgrims.

== Sustainability ==
Hajj has a considerable environmental impact, with the average pilgrim contributing about 60.5 kg CO_{2-eq} per day. Transport, lodging, food, and waste generated an estimated 3.0 million tonnes of carbon dioxide equivalent during the 2011 Hajj season. Most pilgrims travel to Mecca by air and long-haul air travel accounts for 60% of greenhouse gas emissions created by Hajj.

Rising global temperatures mean that in the future, people undertaking Hajj could face "extreme danger" due to heat and humidity. Projected temperature rises of 1.5° to 2° could have significant impacts on the health of participants, many of whom are elderly. In 2021 Ummah for Earth and Greenpeace Middle East published research which suggested climate actions which included adapting the Great Mosque for solar power. In the summer of 2024, Saudi officials reported treating more than 2,000 people for heat stress. As of 21 June, 550 people had died from heat stroke. At least 320 of the dead were from Egypt. As of 23 June 2024, more than 1000 people had died, more than half of them from Egypt. The government revoked the licenses of 16 travel agencies that helped unauthorized pilgrims travel to Saudi Arabia. As of 2 July the Saudi government said that 1301 people had died doing the Hajj.

=== Green Hajj Camp ===
In 2011, Husna Ahmad created the first green guide to Hajj. In 2019, Saudi Arabia launched an environment-friendly Hajj initiative under the auspices of the environmental technologist Magda Abu Ras. One aspect discouraged the consumption of plastics and was entitled Hajj without Plastic. The project is implemented in 30 camps in Mina where pilgrims are encouraged to sort out their waste. Moreover, the proceeds are used for charitable purposes. The project has a number of objectives as follows:

1. Decreasing environmental harm.
2. Improving the management system of solid waste.
3. Preserving pilgrims' and camps' safety.

== Incidents ==
=== Crowd-control problems ===
Pilgrim numbers have greatly increased in recent years, which has led to numerous accidents and deaths due to overcrowding. The first major accident during Hajj in modern times occurred in 1990, when a tunnel crowd crush led to the death of 1,462 people. Afterwards, various crowd-control techniques were adopted to improve safety. Because of large crowds, some of the rituals have become more symbolic. For example, it is no longer necessary to kiss the Black Stone. Instead, pilgrims simply point at it on each circuit around the Kaaba. Also, the large pillars used for pebble throwing were changed into long walls in 2004 with basins below to catch the stones. Another example is that animal sacrifice is now done at slaughterhouses appointed by the Saudi authorities, without the pilgrims being present there.

Despite safety measures, incidents may happen during the Hajj as pilgrims are trampled or ramps collapse under the weight of the many visitors. During the 2015 Hajj, a crush resulted in 769 deaths and injuries to 934 others, according to the Saudi authorities. A report from Associated Press totalled at least 2,411 deaths from official reports from other countries, making it the most deadly such episode to date. Concerns were raised in 2013 and 2014 about the spread of MERS because of mass gatherings during the Hajj. Saudi Health Minister Abdullah Al-Rabia said authorities have detected no cases of MERS among the pilgrims so far. He also said that, despite the few cases of MERS, Saudi Arabia was ready for the 2014 pilgrimage.

In November 2017, Saudi authorities banned selfies at the two holy sites.

=== COVID-19 ===
In February 2020, Saudi Arabia temporarily banned foreign pilgrims from entering Mecca and Medina to prevent the spread of COVID-19 in the Kingdom. It later temporarily suspended the pilgrimage of Umrah. In June, the Saudi government announced that only "very limited numbers" of pilgrims already resident in Saudi Arabia would be permitted to participate in the Hajj.

== Hajj and the Saudi economy ==
In 2014, Saudi Arabia was expected to have earned up to $8.5 billion from Hajj. Saudi Arabia's highest source of revenue after oil and gas is Hajj and the country is expected to depend more on Hajj as the amounts of available oil and gas for sale decline.

Furthermore, the increase of religious tourism from about 12 million Muslims annually to almost 17 million by 2025 has given rise to increasing luxury hotel businesses in the area to accommodate pilgrims. The Abraj al-Bait firm intends to build hotels, shopping malls and apartments which is claimed to be an estimated value of three billion dollars. According to The Embassy of Saudi Arabia, the Saudi government are working towards establishing programs which promote sanitation, housing, transportation, and welfare as the number of visiting pilgrims increases.

Most pilgrims, from countries such as the United States, Australia and the United Kingdom decide to purchase packages from licensed Hajj agencies in their countries. This helps direct the flow of traffic into the Kingdom and allows for pilgrims to work directly with a business responsible for their services instead of dealing directly with Saudi Arabia's government.

In July 2020, the WSJ reported that following the COVID-19 pandemic, the Saudi authorities curtailed the five-day event in Mecca to fewer than 10,000 people already residing in the country. It also noted that the hospitality and housing industries, which rely entirely on Hajj revenues, would face severe losses of revenue.

In 2017, the Hajj and Umrah revenues were expected to exceed US$150 billion by 2022. Hajj revenues are expected to cross US$350 billion by 2032, according to a report published by The Moodie Davitt.

== Number of pilgrims per year ==
Pictographic world map comparing the largest periodic human migration events

There has been a substantial increase in the number of pilgrims during the last 92 years, and the number of foreign pilgrims has increased by approximately 2,824 percent, from 58,584 in 1920 to 1,712,962 in 2012. Because of development and expansion work at Masjid al-Haram, the authority restricted the number of pilgrims in 2013.

Between 1940 and 1945, foreign pilgrims were restricted from arriving in Saudi Arabia as a result of World War II; the pilgrimages in 2020 and 2021 were severely restricted while the country was dealing with the COVID-19 pandemic. In the most recent 2023 Hajj, there were 1,845,045 total pilgrims, including about 184,000 Saudis.

The following number of pilgrims arrived in Saudi Arabia each year to perform Hajj:

Gregorian year	Hijri year	Local pilgrims	Foreign pilgrims	Total
1920	1338		58,584	
1921	1339		57,255	
1922	1340		56,319	
1950	1369		100,000 (approx.)	
1950s			150,000 (approx.)	
1960s			300,000 (approx.)	
1970s			700,000 (approx.)	
1980s			900,000 (approx.)	
1989	1409		774,600	
1990	1410		827,200	
1991	1411		720,100	
1992	1412		1,015,700	
1993	1413		992,800	
1994	1414		997,400	
1995	1415		1,046,307	
1996	1416	784,769	1,080,465	1,865,234
1997	1417	774,260	1,168,591	1,942,851
1998	1418	699,770	1,132,344	1,832,114
1999	1419	775,268	1,056,730	1,831,998
2000	1420	466,430	1,267,355	1,733,785
2001	1421	440,808	1,363,992	1,804,800
2002	1422	590,576	1,354,184	1,944,760
2003	1423	493,230	1,431,012	1,924,242
2004	1424	473,004	1,419,706	1,892,710
2005	1425	1,030,000 (approx.)	1,534,769	2,560,000 (approx.)
2006	1426	573,147	1,557,447	2,130,594
2006	1427	724,229	1,654,407	2,378,636
2007	1428	746,511	1,707,814	2,454,325
2008	1429		1,729,841	
2009	1430	154,000	1,613,000	2,521,000
2010	1431	989,798	1,799,601	2,854,345
2011	1432	1,099,522	1,828,195	2,927,717
2012	1433	1,408,641	1,752,932	3,161,573
2013	1434	600,718	1,379,531	1,980,249
2014	1435	696,185	1,389,053	2,085,238
2015	1436	567,876	1,384,941	1,952,817
2016	1437	537,537	1,325,372	1,862,909
2017	1438	600,108	1,752,014	2,352,122
2018	1439	612,953	1,758,722	2,371,675
2019	1440	634,379	1,855,027	2,489,406
2020	1441			1,000
2021	1442	58,745	0	58,745
2022	1443	119,434	779,919	899,353
2023	1444	184,000		1,845,045
2024	1445	221,854	1,611,310	1,833,164
2025	1446	166,654	1,506,576	1,673,230
2026	1447	160,646	1,546,655	1,707,301

== Gallery ==
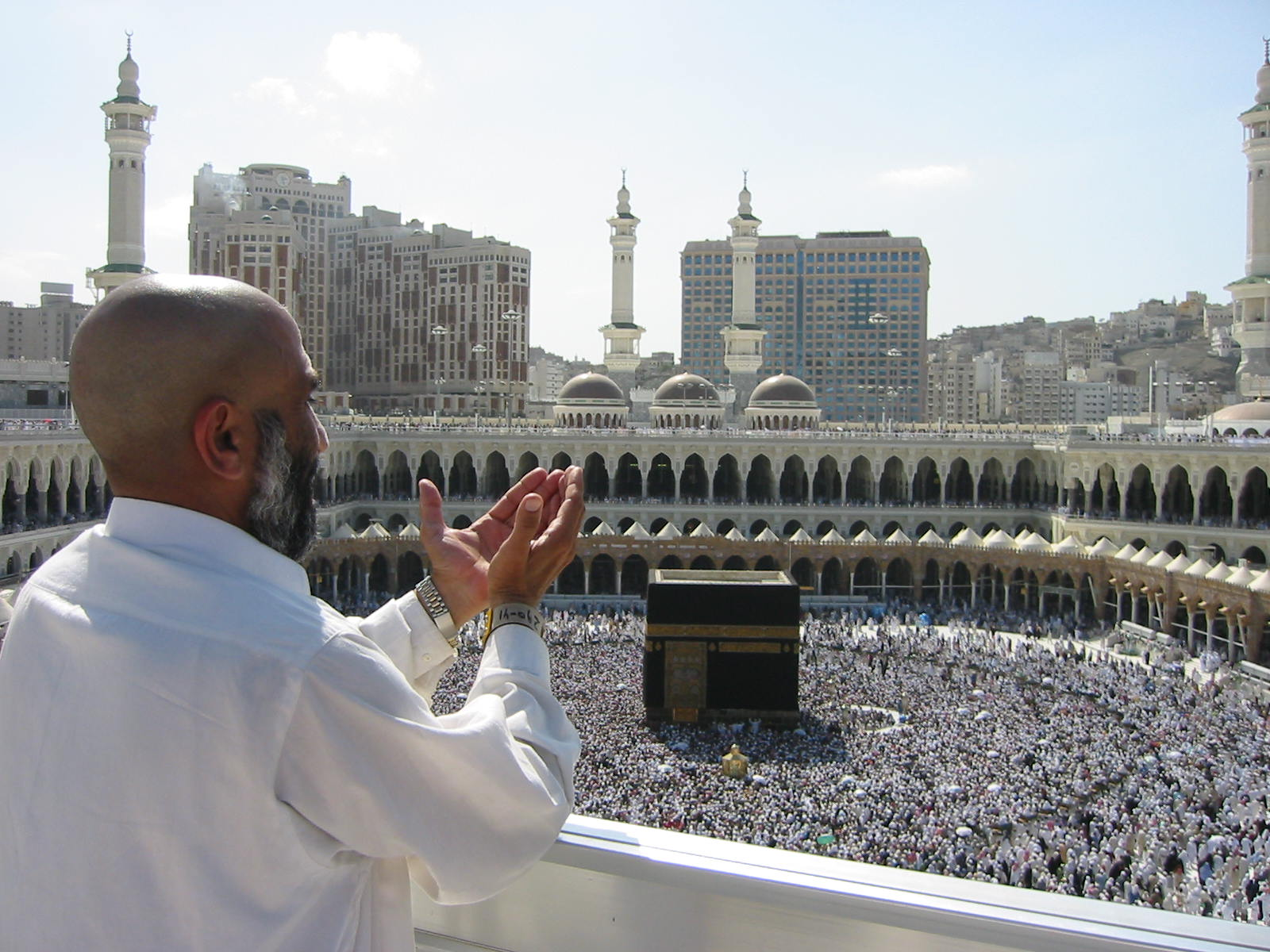
Pilgrim in supplication at the Al-Masjid Al-Haram in Mecca.

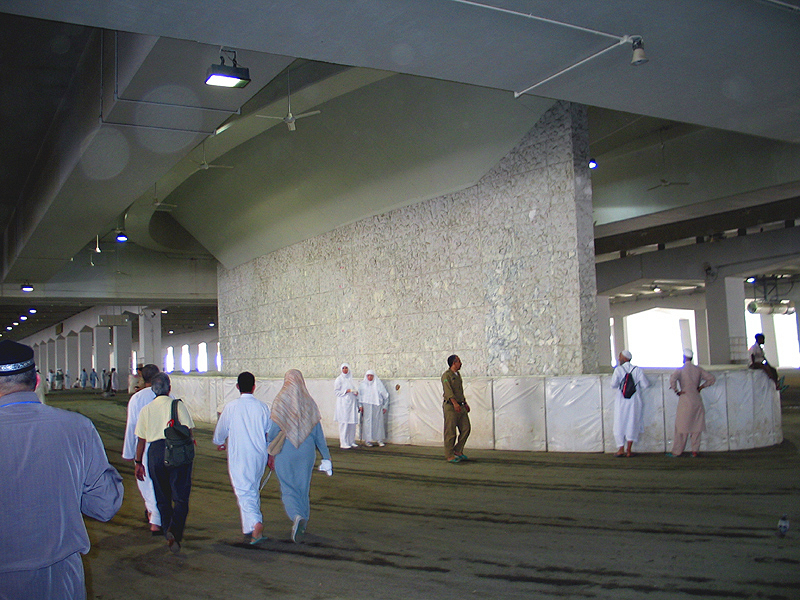
The largest Jamarah (pillar). These pillars depict the devil and low human desires and are stoned by the devotees as an act of rejection.

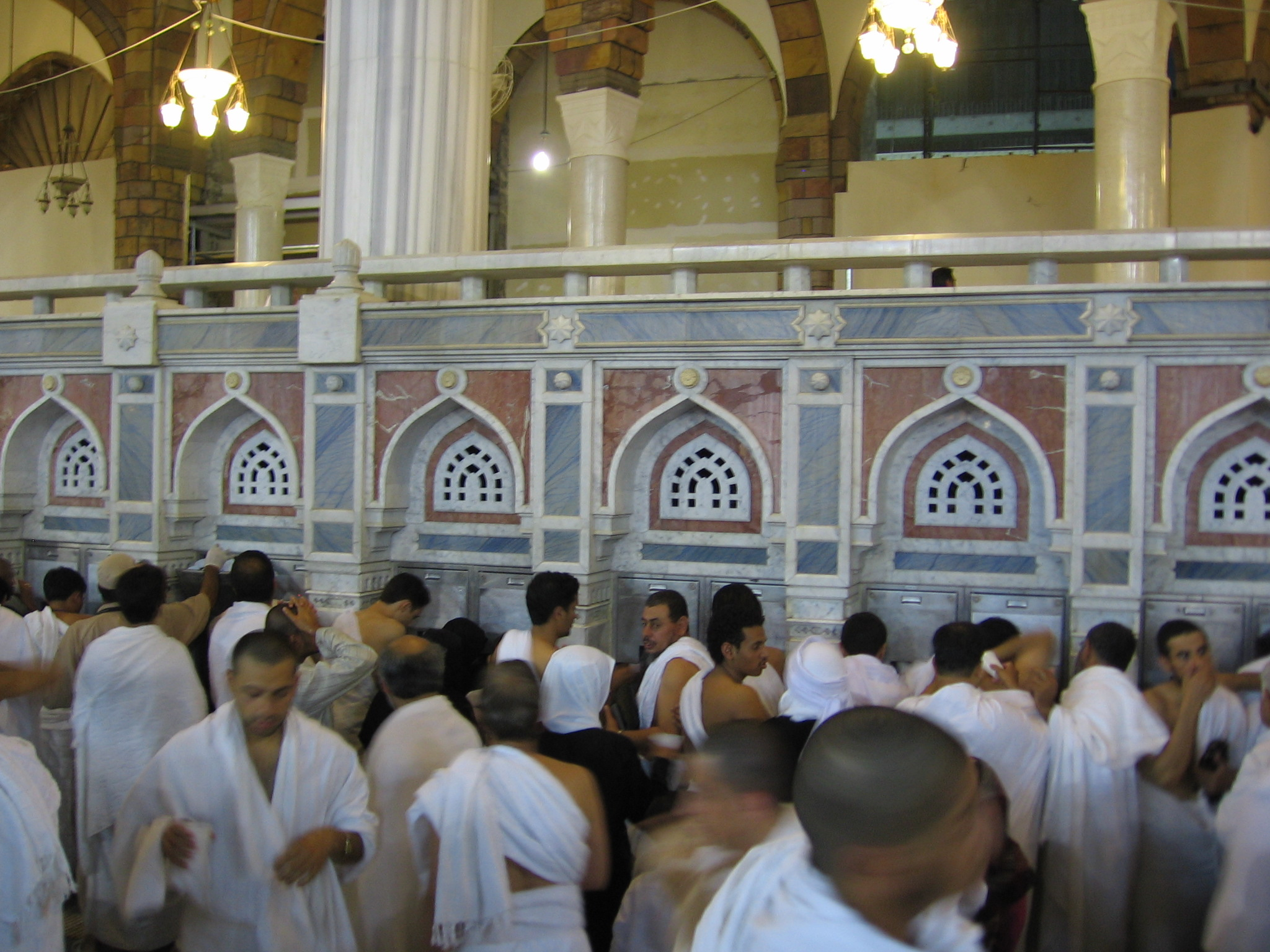
Pilgrims visiting the well of Zamzam.

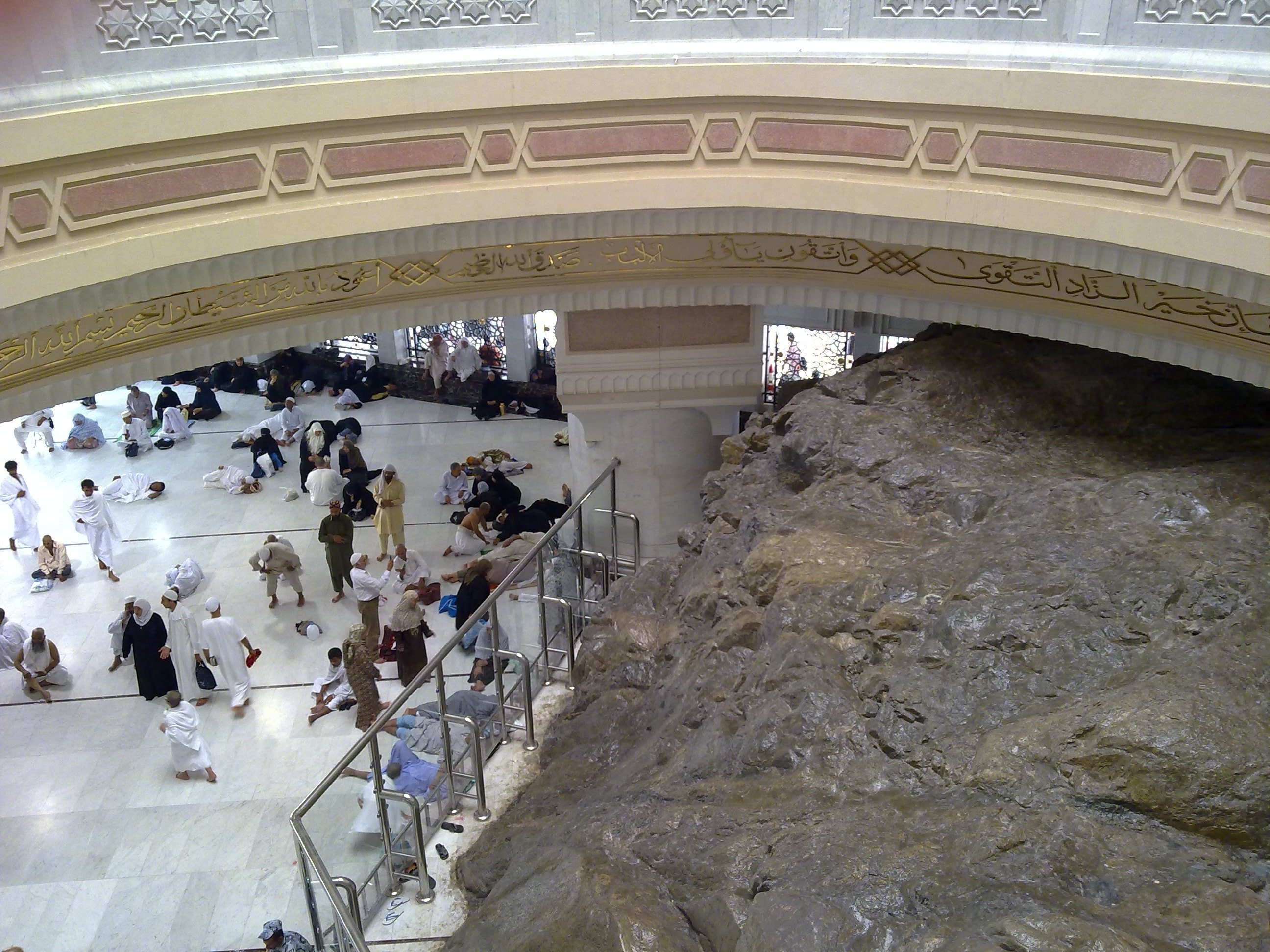
Mount Safa within the Al-Masjid Al-Haram in Mecca.

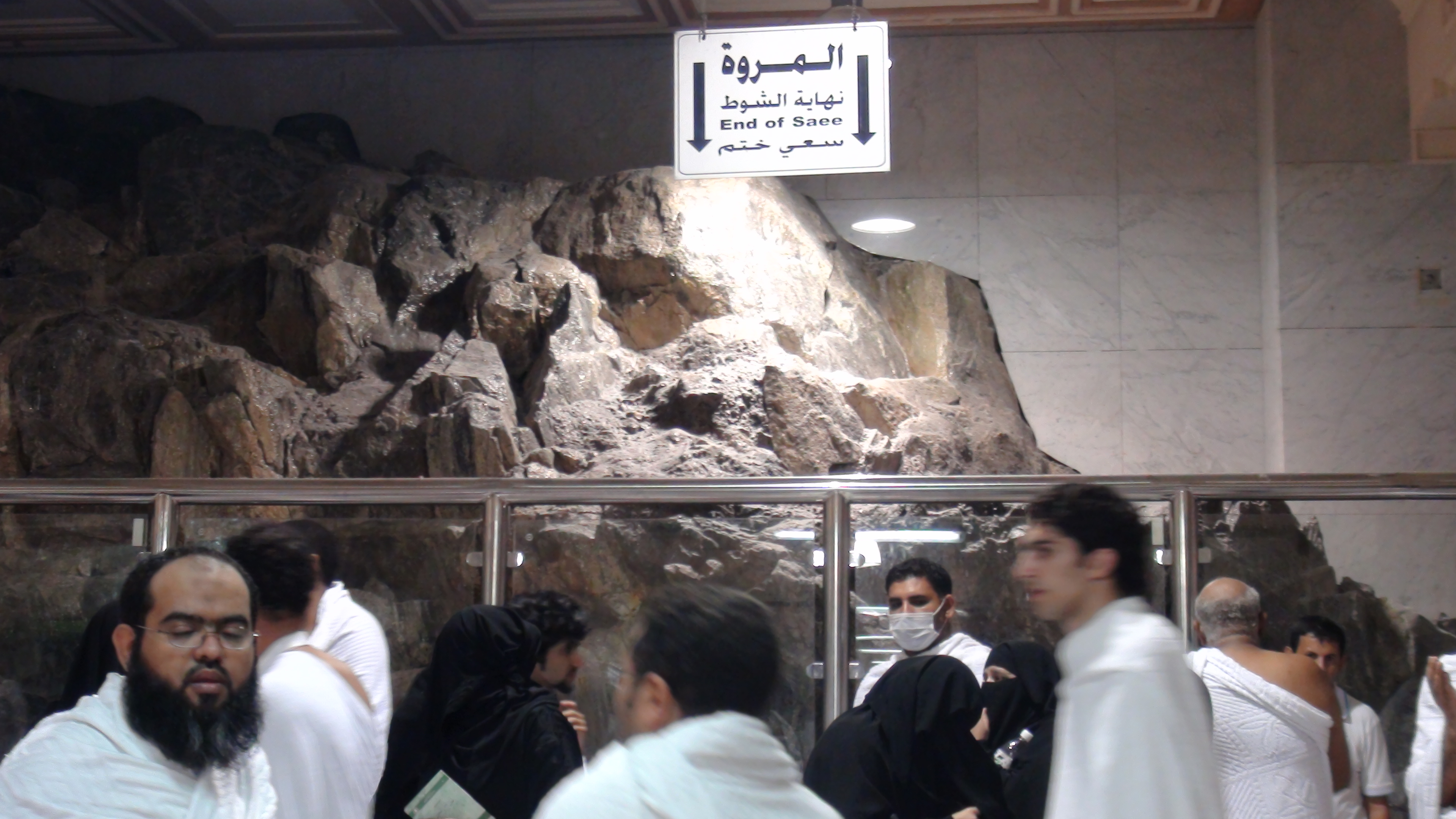
Mount Marwah within the Al-Masjid Al-Haram in Mecca.

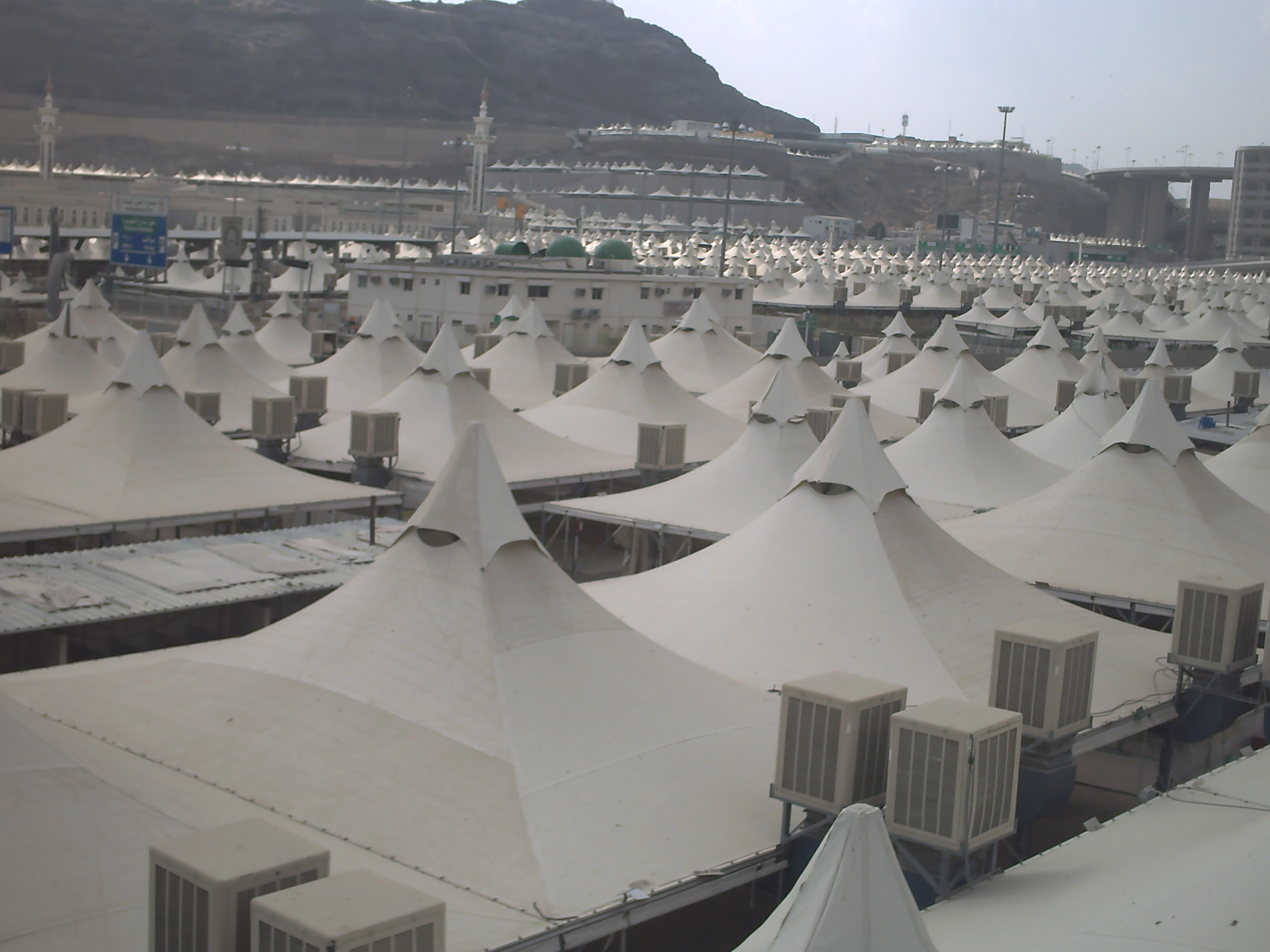
Tents at Mina.

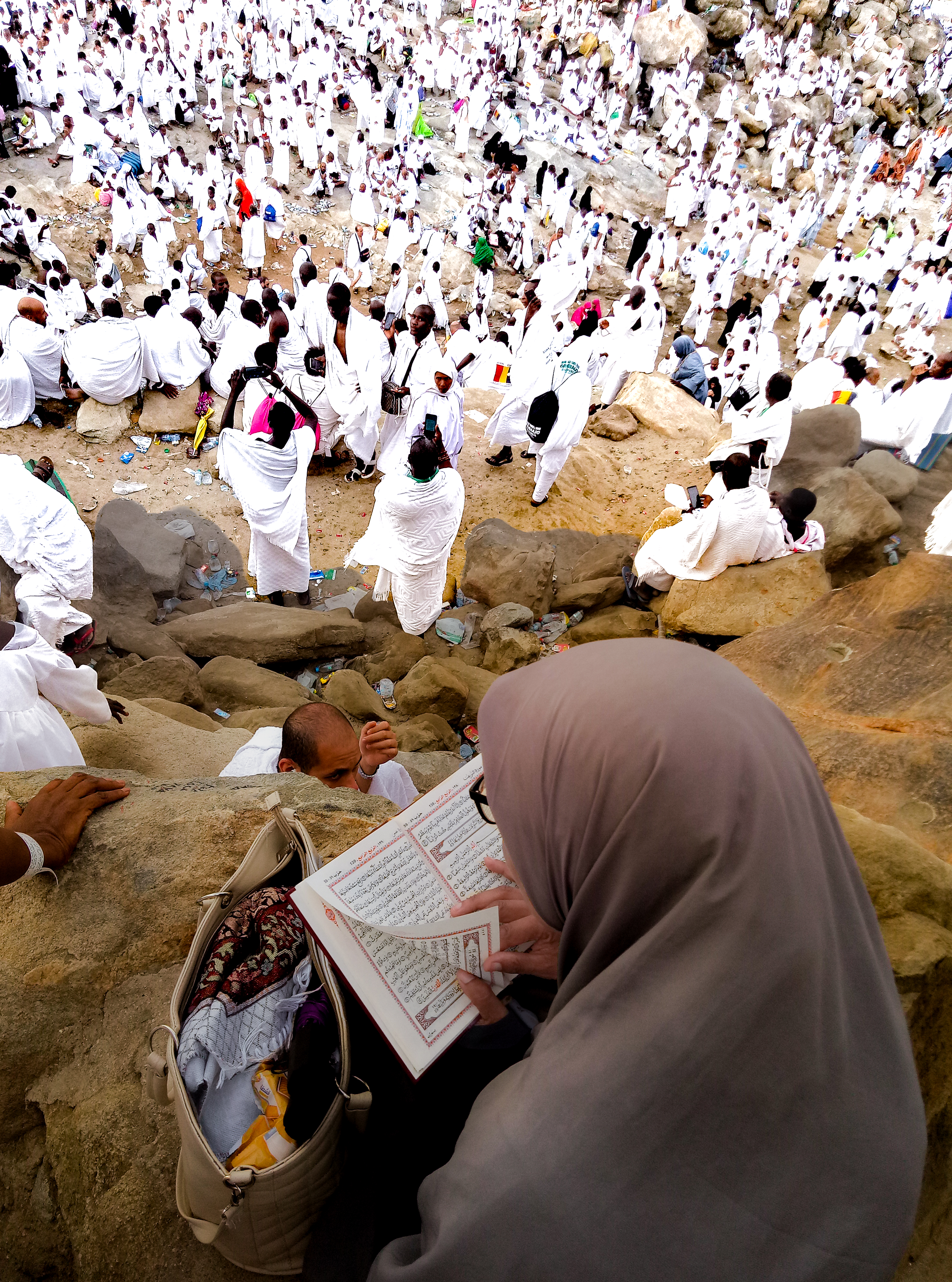
Mount Arafat during Ḥajj with Pilgrims supplicating.

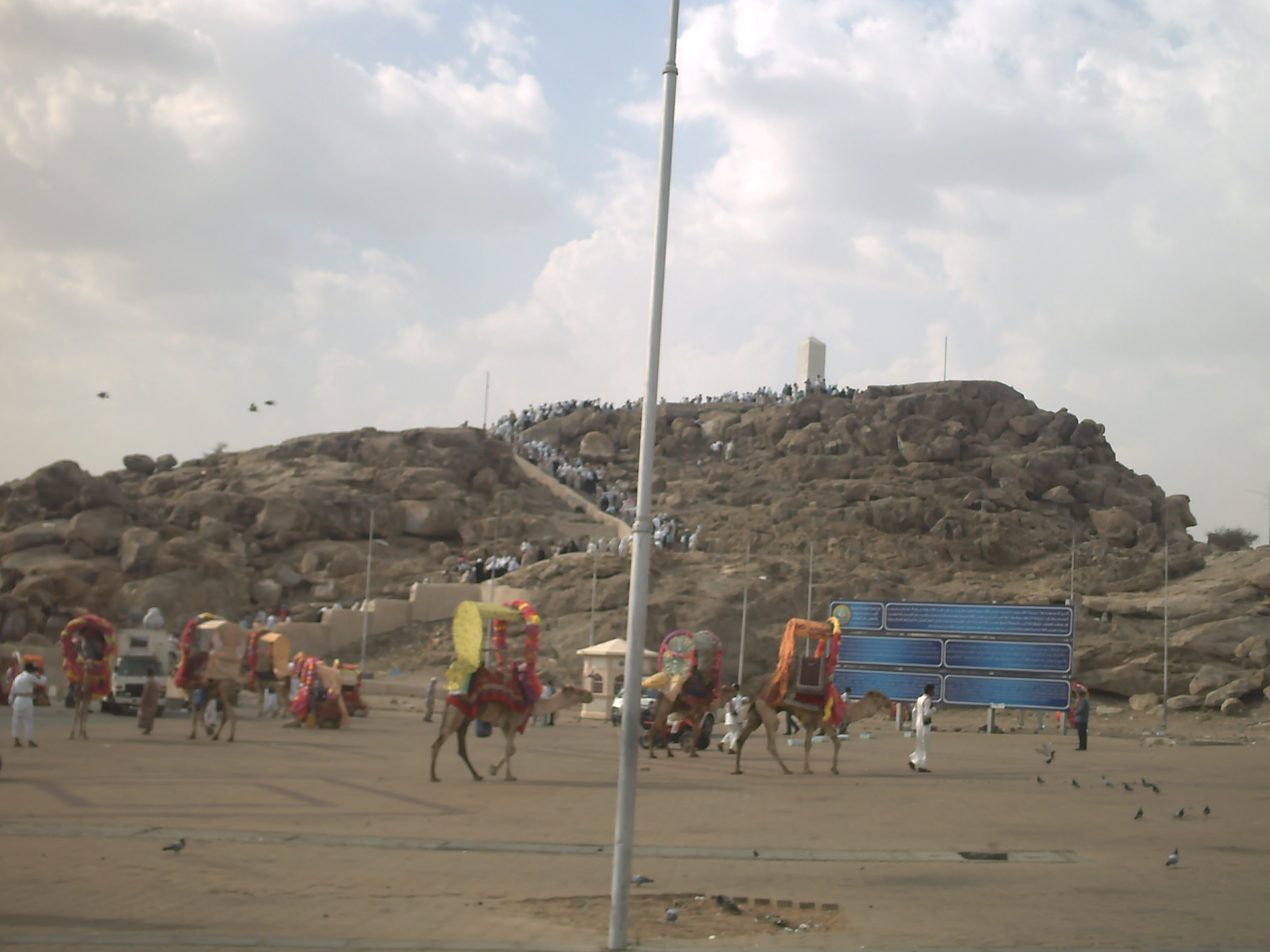
Mount Arafat, a few miles away from Mecca.

== See also ==
- Disavowal of polytheists in Hajj
- Glossary of Islam
- Hajj: Journey to the Heart of Islam
- Hajj and Pilgrimage Organization (Iran)
- Hejaz
- Incidents during the Hajj
- Khalili Collection of Hajj and the Arts of Pilgrimage
- List of largest peaceful gatherings
