= Impact of the COVID-19 pandemic on Hajj =

Effect of viral outbreak on Muslim pilgrimage

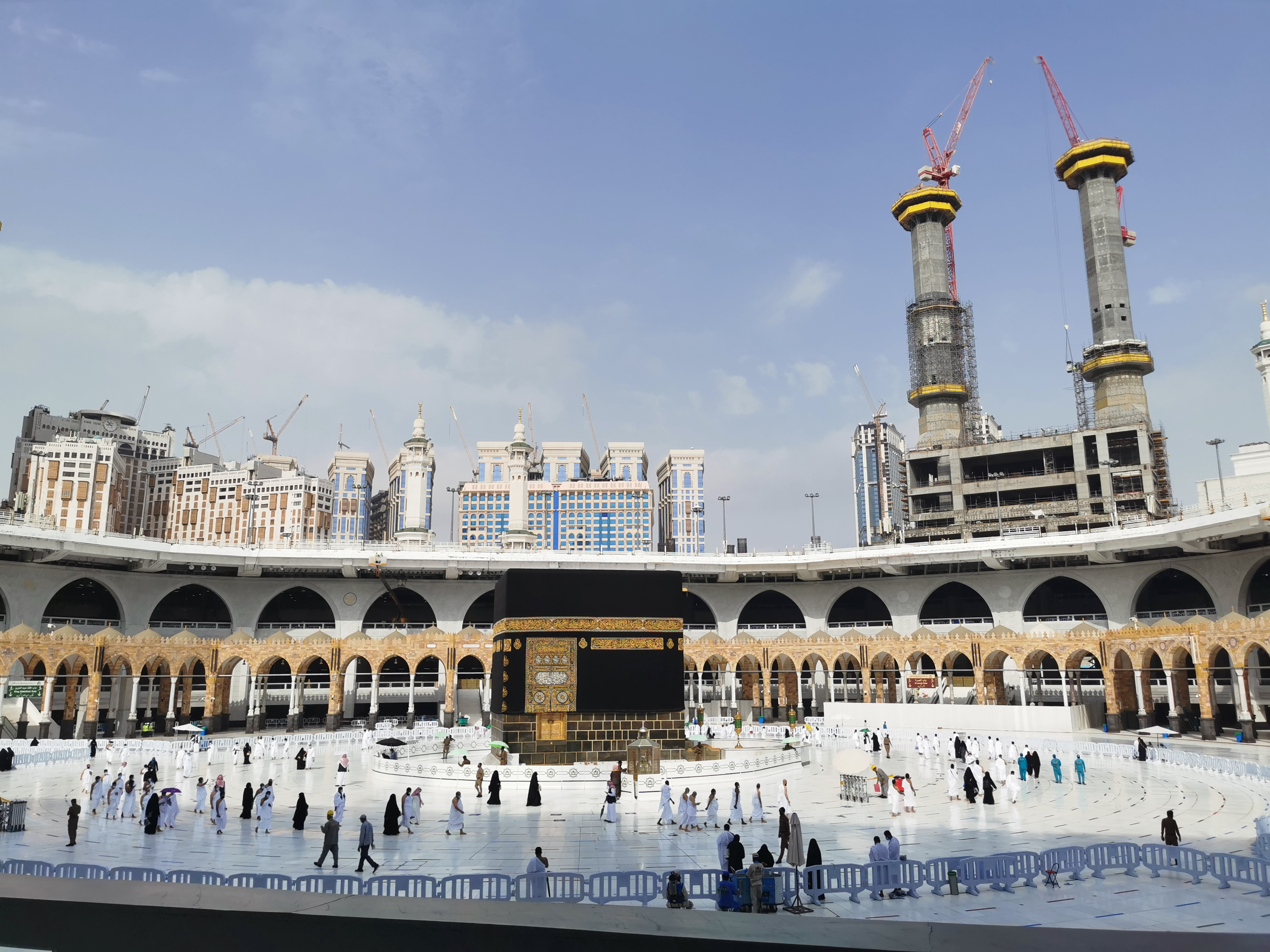
Kaaba in July 2021, during COVID-19 restrictions

The COVID-19 pandemic affected the 2020 Hajj (pilgrimage), which is the fifth of the Five Pillars of Islam, where millions of Muslims from around the world visit Mecca and Medina every year during the Hajj season for a week. Over 2,400,000 pilgrims attended Hajj in 2019. Due to the highly contagious nature of COVID-19 in crowded places, various international travel restrictions, and social distancing recommendations, the Ministry of Hajj and Umrah advised Muslims to postpone their pilgrimage until the pandemic was mitigated. However, in June 2020, the Ministry opened up Hajj to people of all nationalities residing in Saudi Arabia, with foreigners still banned from attending to ensure pilgrims' safety and prevent the transmission of COVID-19.

In April 2022, Saudi Arabia eased COVID-19 restrictions and increased Hajj capacity. One million pilgrims from inside and outside the country were allowed to participate in the Hajj.

== Background ==
The COVID-19 pandemic is an ongoing global pandemic caused by coronavirus disease 2019. The outbreak of the virus was first noted in Wuhan, China in early December 2019. On 30 January 2020, COVID-19 was declared a Public Health Emergency of International Concern by the World Health Organization, and was declared a pandemic on 11 March 2020. The transmission of COVID-19 occurs mainly through personal contact with a carrier of the virus, which makes it highly contagious in small spaces where human contact is inevitable. COVID-19 can be transmitted through contaminated objects that were touched or coughed on by an infected person.

=== Historical cancellations of Hajj ===
Hajj (pilgrimage) has been cancelled 40 times through the history of Islam due to disease outbreaks, political disagreements, and battles. In 930-940 CE (318-328 AH), Hajj was canceled due to the Qarmatian attack, which led to the murder of 30,000 pilgrims and the looting of the Black Stone. In 1831, Hajj was suspended after the arrival of Indian pilgrims in Mecca led to the outbreak of a new plague, which is claimed to have killed more than half of the pilgrims in Mecca. The first outbreak of cholera in Mecca occurred in 1846, killing more than 15,000 and causing a citywide plague lasting until 1850. A second outbreak of cholera happened in 1858, leading to pilgrims being quarantined inside Hajj camps in Egypt.

== Hajj 2020 ==
In February 2020, Saudi Arabia closed the two holy sites of Mecca and Medina to halt the spread of the virus, but reopened in early March. Later, measures were taken by the Saudi government to mitigate an outbreak of COVID-19, such as imposing a 24-hour curfew in Mecca and Medina.

=== Participant selection ===
On 23 June 2020, Saudi Arabia announced Hajj would be held for a limited number of pilgrims who resided within the country due to the high risk of COVID-19. The Saudi Ministry of Hajj and Umrah imposed restrictions to the type of pilgrims who can attend Hajj in 2020, only healthy Saudi residents between the ages of 20 and 50 with no COVID-19 symptoms were allowed to participate. Participants had to first apply online, and preference was given to those who had not attended in the past. Pilgrims were chosen from the COVID-19 recovery database, 70% of them were non-Saudi nationals with Saudi residency.

Only ten thousand pilgrims were expected, as opposed to over two million in previous years.

=== Safety measures ===
The Saudi Ministry of Health reported taking serious measures during the Hajj 2020. Pilgrims who were not affected by the virus were required to quarantine themselves at hotel rooms or at their homes if they lived close enough to Mecca for a week prior to the arrival to perform Hajj. Inside the mosque, pilgrims were asked to maintain a safe social distance of two meters, and were separated into groups of 20 individuals who were accompanied by a guide through their whole Hajj performance.

== Hajj 2021 ==
On 12 June 2021, Saudi authorities banned foreign visitors for the second consecutive year and limited the pilgrimage to 60,000 people. It also imposed as condition that people participating be between the ages of 18 and 65, vaccinated and without chronic diseases.

== International reactions ==
On 15 May 2020, the Singapore Muslims Council (MUIS) advised pilgrims to skip Hajj that year due to the COVID-19 pandemic.

On 2 June 2020, the Indonesian Minister of Religious Affairs declared cancelling the 2020 Hajj before any groups of Indonesian pilgrims headed to Mecca.

On 6 June 2020, the Indian Hajj Committee announced it would provide refunds to all the pilgrims who were unable to attend Hajj in 2020.

On 11 June 2020, Malaysia announced it was barring pilgrims from attending Hajj in 2020 out of concerns over the danger of COVID-19, and the high spreadability of the virus in crowded places.

== See also ==
- COVID-19 pandemic in Saudi Arabia
- Incidents during the Hajj
- List of largest peaceful gatherings in history
- Glossary of Islam
