= Haram (disambiguation) =

Haram is an Arabic term (حَرَام) meaning 'forbidden'.

Haram or Al-Haram may also refer to:

- Haram (site) (حرم), a 'sanctuary' or 'holy shrine' in the Islamic faith or Arabic language
  - Great Mosque of Mecca (Masjid al-Haram), a mosque in Saudi Arabia
  - Temple Mount (Haram al-Sharif), a hill in Jerusalem
  - Al-Aqsa (Haram al-Sharif), a religious site in Jerusalem

== Music ==
- Haram (Armand Hammer album), 2021
- Haram, album by Gunplay, 2017
- Haram!, album by GoldLink, 2021

== Films ==
- Haram (film), a 2015 Indian film
- The Sin (1965 film), or Al-Haram, an Egyptian film

== People ==
- Al-Haram (tribe), the Bedouin tribe
- Ali Haram (born 1988), a Bahraini footballer
- Arnfinn Haram (1948–2012), Norwegian Dominican brother
- Woo Ha-ram (born 1988), a South Korean diver

== Places ==
- Haram, Iran, a village in Yaft Rural District in Ardabil Province, Iran
- Haram Municipality, a municipality in Møre og Romsdal county, Norway
  - Haram Church, a church within Haram Municipality in Norway
- Haram (Yemen), an ancient city in the north of al-Jawf in Yemen
- Al-Haram, Jaffa, a former Palestinian Arab village north of Tel-Aviv, Israel

== See also ==
- Harem (disambiguation)
- Herem (disambiguation)
- H-R-M
- Boko Haram – African jihadist organization
- Muharram – First month of the Islamic calendar
