= Mellah =

Walled Jewish quarter in Morocco

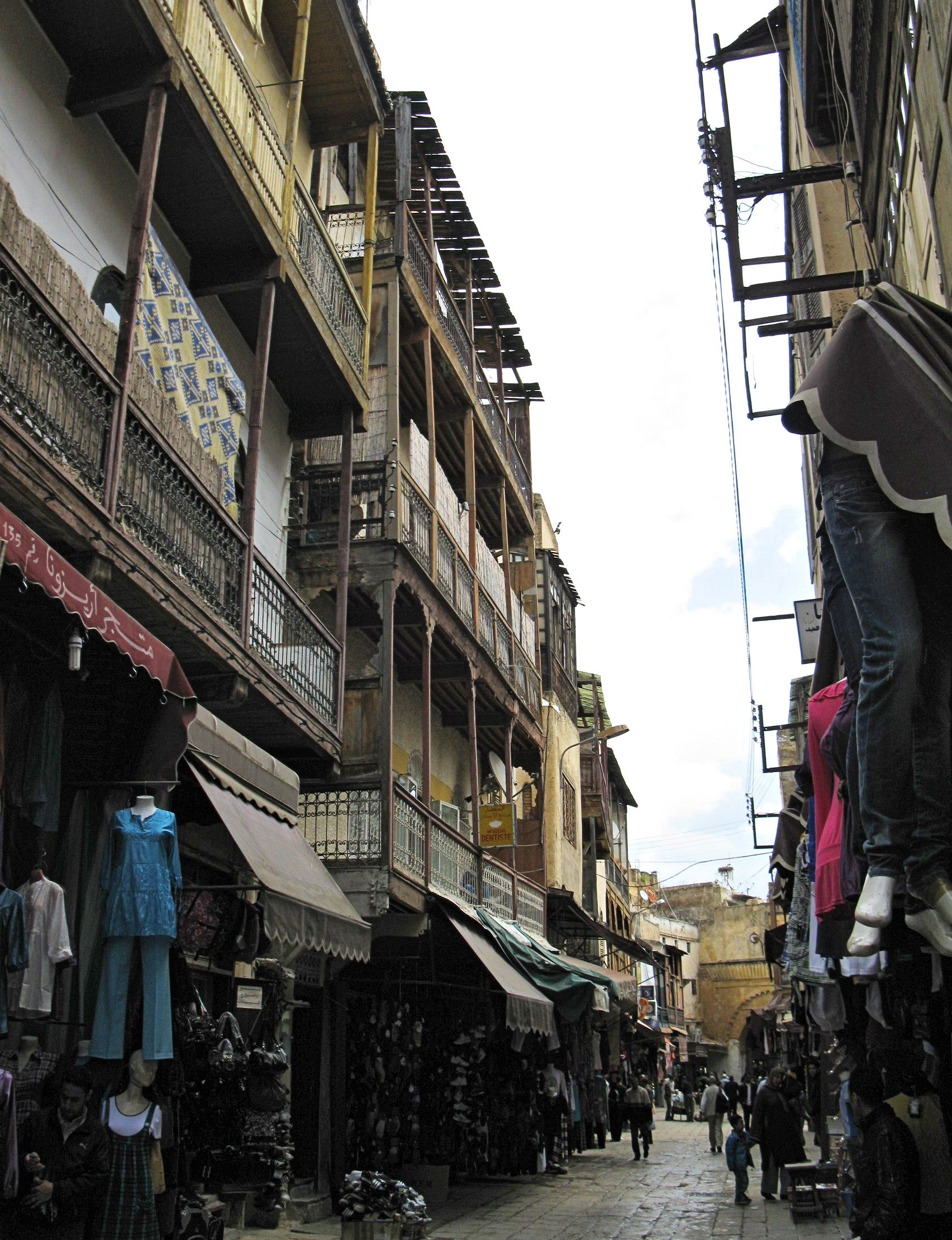
The central street of the Mellah of Fez featuring balconies—which distinguished domestic architecture of Jewish homes from contemporary inward-facing Muslim homes in Morocco—that were rebuilt in modern styles after French artillery fire in 1912 caused severe structural damage to the buildings.

A mellah (Arabic: ملاح, romanized: Mallāḥ, lit. 'salt' or 'saline area'; and Hebrew: מלאח) is the place of residence historically assigned to Jewish communities in Morocco.

The urban mellah, as it exists in numerous cities and large towns, is a Jewish quarter enclosed by a wall and a fortified gateway, typically near the residence of the sultan or governor. In cities, the mellah was usually situated near the qaṣba (citadel), the royal palace, or the residence of the governor; some residents of the mellah held senior administrative positions and had to be available.

The rural mellah, as it exists or existed in the mountainous regions of the Atlas and the Rif and in the plains regions reaching to the Sahara, is a relatively isolated open village inhabited exclusively by Jews. These villages existed at a distance from the nearest qṣar or qaid.

Starting in the 15th century in Fes and especially since the beginning of the 19th century elsewhere, mellah districts were established in many Moroccan cities for the Jewish communities to live in. The name mellah derives from a local toponym in Fes which became the name of the first separate Jewish district in Morocco (the Mellah of Fez) created in that city during the 15th century. Haim Zafrani notes that the institution of the mellah was only imposed on some communities and only as of relatively recently in Moroccan history, and that segregation was not the rule in Islamic lands as it was in Christian lands.

== History ==
=== Origins of the first Mellah in Fez (15th century) ===
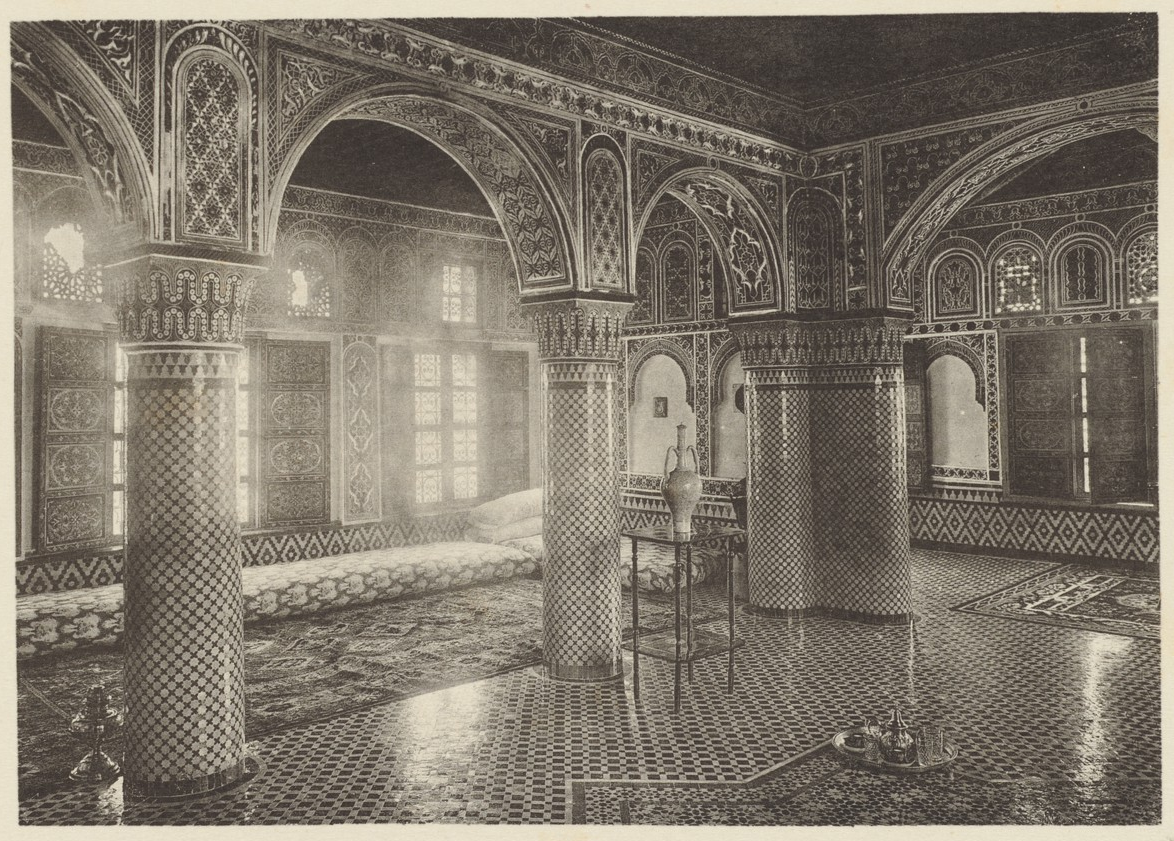
The interior of a wealthy Jewish family's home in the Mellah of Fes, photographed in 1922. The decoration includes distinctive features of traditional domestic architecture in Morocco, including carved stucco and geometric zellij tiling.

The first Mellah of Morocco was created in the city of Fez. Fez had long hosted the largest and one of the oldest Jewish communities in Morocco, present since the city's foundation by the Idrisids (in the late 8th or early 9th century). Since the time of Idris II (early 9th century) a Jewish community was concentrated in the neighbourhood known as Foundouk el-Yihoudi ("Caravanserai of the Jew") near Bab Guissa in the northeast of the city. Nonetheless, historical evidence also shows that the Jewish population was widely distributed in many parts of the old city (Fes el Bali) alongside the Muslim population, including near the University of al-Qarawiyyin in the heart of the city.

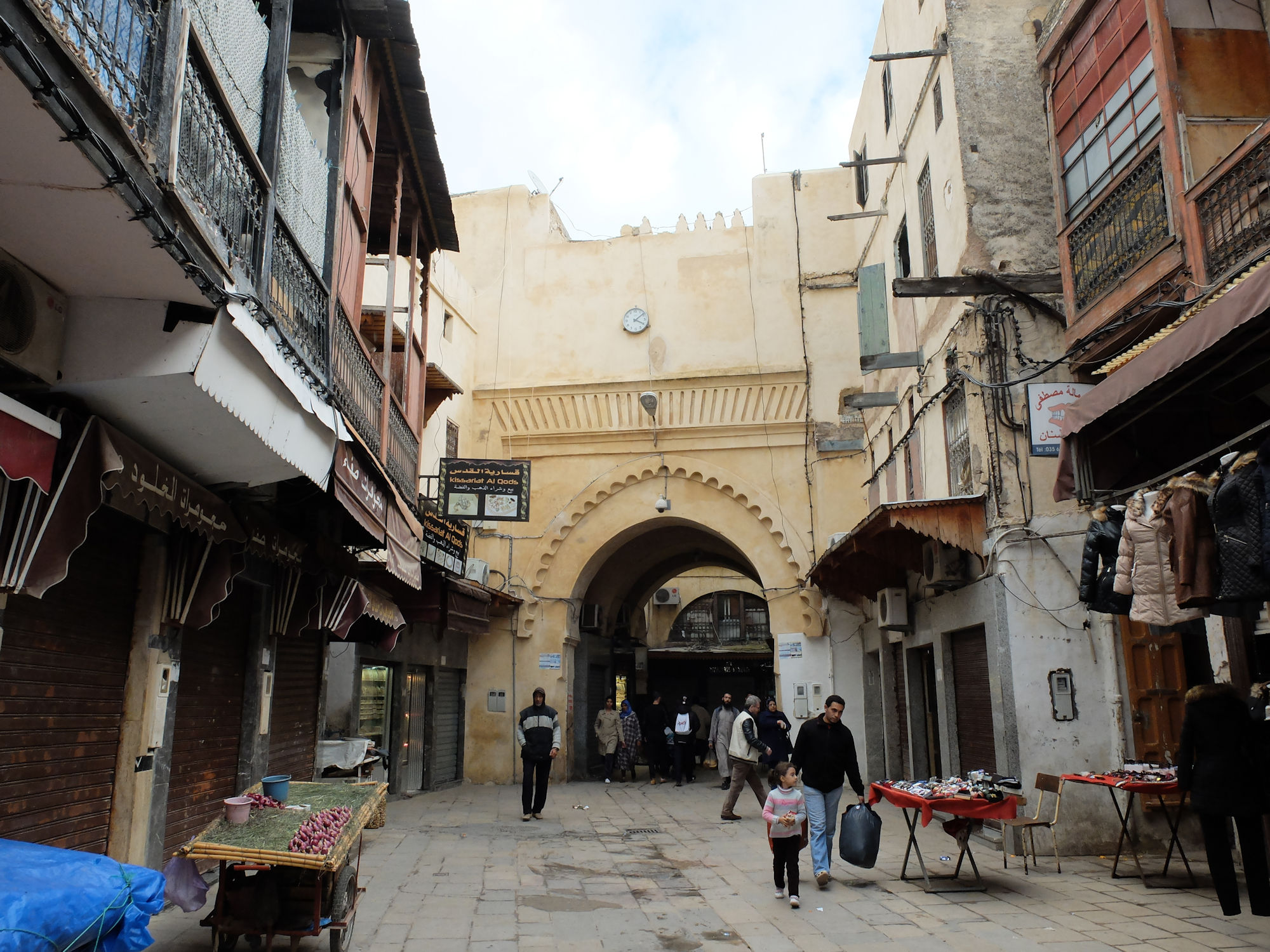
Bab el-Mellah, the historic entrance to the Jewish Mellah of Fez

In 1276 the Marinid sultan Abu Yusuf Yaqub ibn Abd al-Haqq founded Fes el-Jdid, a new fortified administrative city to house their troops and the royal palace. The city included a southern district, known as Hims, which was initially inhabited by Muslim garrisons, particularly the Sultan's mercenary contingents of Syrian archers, which were later disbanded.

The same district, however, was also known by the name Mellah (Arabic: ملاح, lit. 'salt' or 'saline area') due to either a saline water source in the area or to the presence of a former salt warehouse. It was this name which was later retained as the name of the subsequent Jewish quarter in the area. Afterwards, the name came to be associated by analogy with similar districts that were later created in other cities such as Marrakesh.

The name mellah thus originally had no negative connotation but was rather just a local toponym. Nonetheless, over generations a number of legends and popular etymologies came to explain the origin of the word as a "salted, cursed ground" or a place where the Jews were forced to "salt" the heads of decapitated rebels.

Both the exact reasons and the exact date for the creation of a separate Jewish Mellah of Fez are not firmly agreed upon by all scholars. Historical accounts confirm that in the mid-14th century the Jews of Fez were still living in Fes el-Bali but that by the end of the 16th century they were well-established in the Mellah of Fes el-Jdid. Some authors argue that the transfer likely happened in stages across the Marinid period (late 13th to 15th centuries), particularly following episodes of violence or repression against Jews in the old city. The urban fabric of the Mellah appears to have developed progressively and it's possible that a small Jewish population settled here right after the foundation of Fes el-Jdid and that other Jews fleeing the old city joined them later. Some scholars, citing historical Jewish chronicles, attribute the date of the move more specifically to the "rediscovery" of Idris II's body in his zawiya at the center of the old city (Fes el-Bali) in 1437. The surrounding area, located in the middle of the city's main commercial districts where Jewish merchants were quite active, was turned into a horm (sanctuary) where non-Muslims were not allowed to enter, resulting in the expulsion of the Jewish inhabitants and businesses there. Many other scholars date the move generally to the mid-15th century.

In any case, the transfer (whether progressive or sudden) occurred with some violence and hardship. Many Jewish households chose to convert (at least officially) rather than leave their homes and their businesses in the heart of the old city, resulting in a growing group referred to as al-Baldiyyin (Muslim families of Jewish origin, often retaining Jewish surnames).

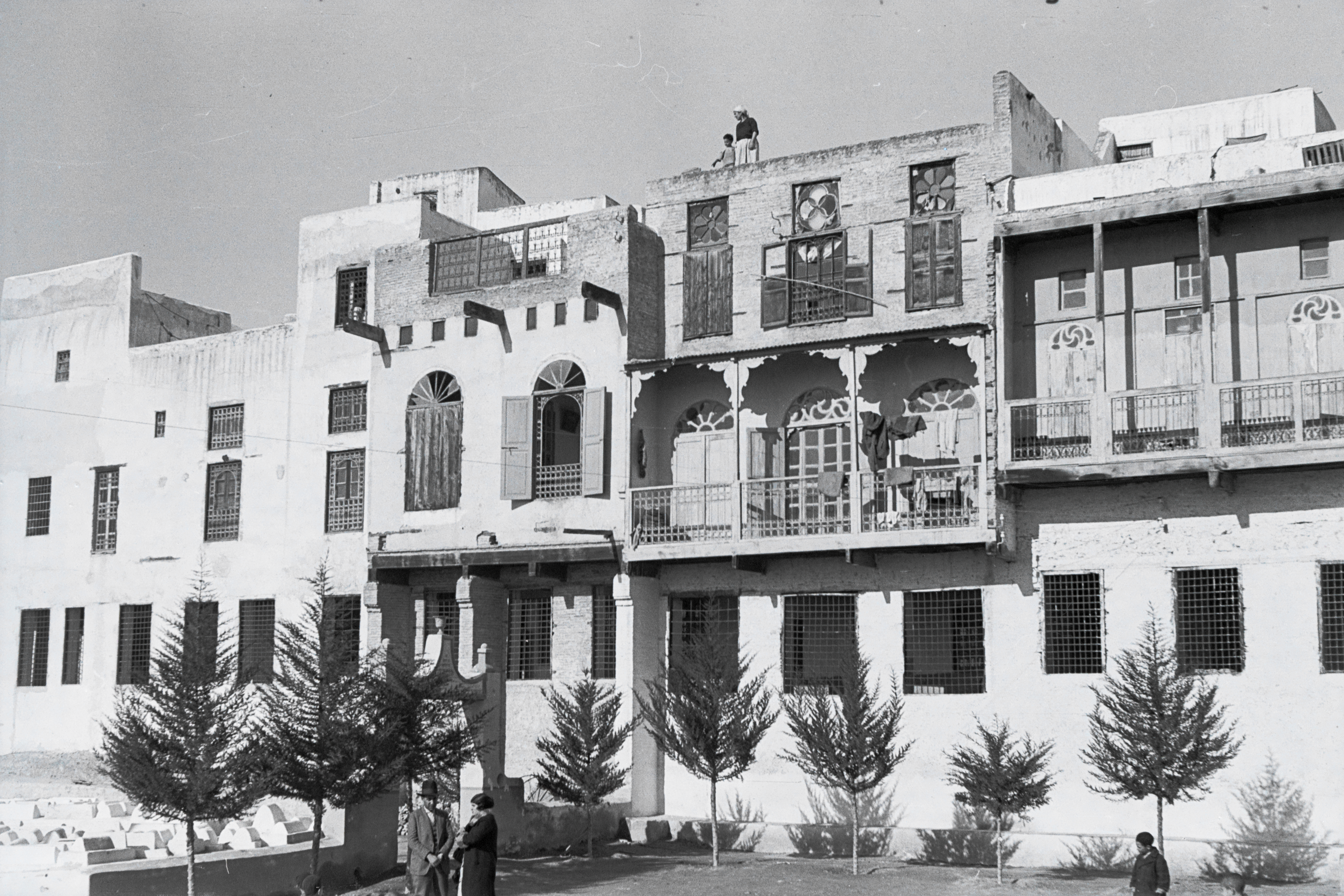
Jewish houses in the Mellah of Fez (photographed in 1932)

Broader political motivations for moving the Jewish community to Fes el-Jdid, closer to the royal palace, may have included the rulers' desire to take more direct advantage (or control) of their artisan skills and of their commercial relations with Jewish communities in Europe and other countries (which, by extension, could also be used for diplomatic purposes). The Mellah's Jewish cemetery was even established on land which was donated to the Jewish community by a Marinid princess named Lalla Mina in the 15th century. The Mellah's location next to the royal palace, within the more heavily fortified Fes el-Jdid, may have also been intended to better protect the Jewish community from the larger and more restive population of the old city; a pattern that would be repeated for future mellahs in other cities.

Despite the more secure location, however, disasters still occasionally struck the community and its district. The 15th century was also a time of relative political instability, with the Wattasid viziers taking over effective control from the Marinid dynasty and competing with other local factions in Fez. In 1465, the Mellah was attacked by the Muslim population of Fes el-Bali during a revolt led by the shurafa (noble sharifian families) against the Marinid sultan Abd al-Haqq II and his Jewish vizier Harun ibn Battash. The attack resulted in thousands of Jewish inhabitants being killed, with many others having to openly renounce their faith. The community took at least a decade to recover from this, only growing again under the rule of the Wattasid sultan Muhammad al-Shaykh (1472-1505).

Major changes in the Jewish population also took place when in 1492 the Spanish crown expelled all Jews from Spain, with Portugal doing the same in 1497. The following waves of Spanish Jews migrating to Fez and North Africa increased the Jewish population and also altered its social, ethnic, and linguistic makeup. The influx of migrants also revitalized Jewish cultural activity in the following years, while splitting the community along ethnic lines for many generations. In Fez, for example, the Megorashim of Spanish origin retained their heritage and their Spanish language while the indigenous Moroccan Toshavim, who spoke Arabic and were of Arab and Berber heritage, followed their own traditions. Members of the two communities worshiped in separate synagogues and were even buried separately. It was only in the 18th century that the two communities eventually blended together, with Arabic eventually becoming the main language of the entire community while the Spanish (Sephardic) minhag became dominant in religious practice; a situation which was repeated elsewhere in Morocco, with the notable exception of the Marrakesh community.

=== 16th–18th centuries ===
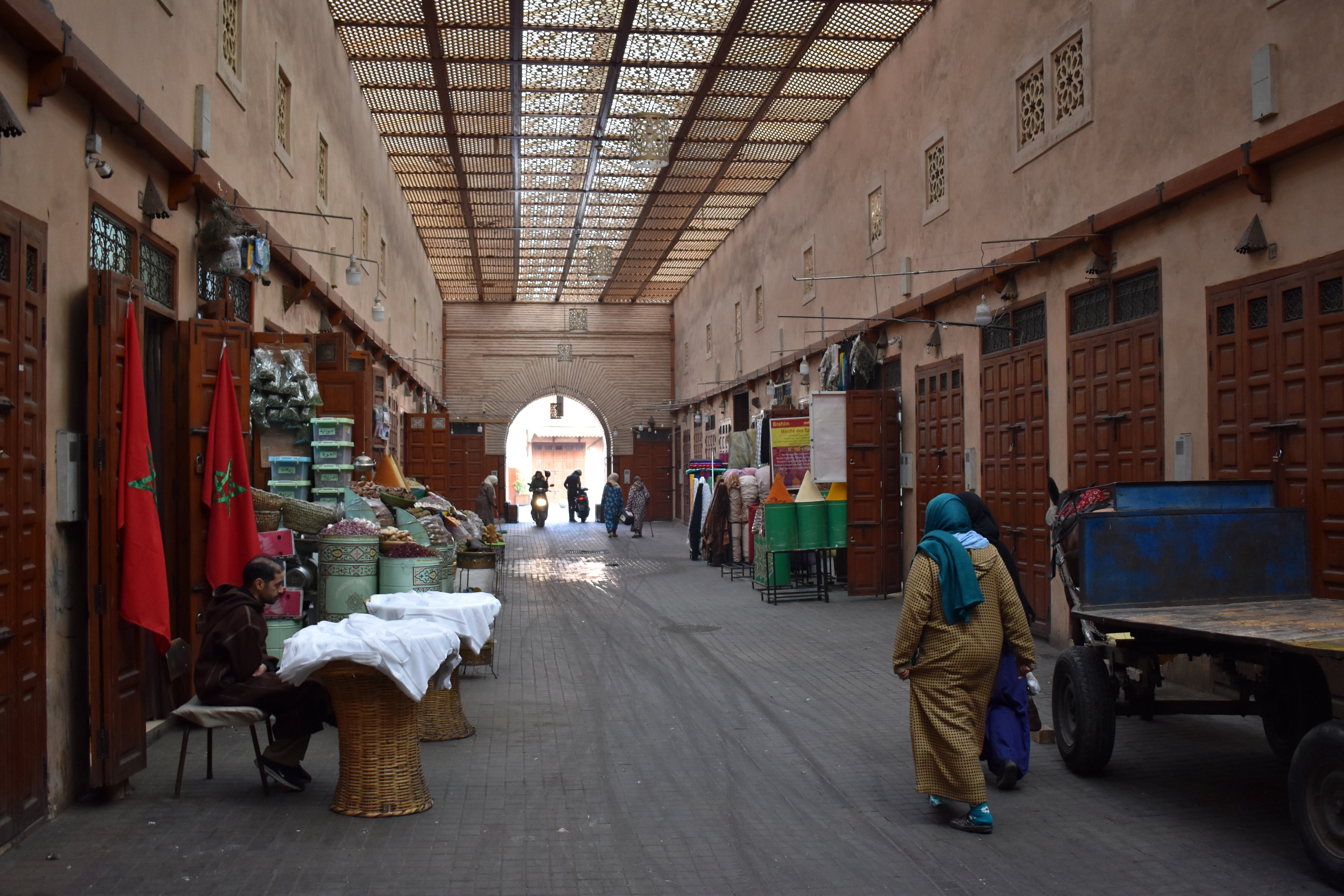
A market street in the Mellah of Marrakesh today

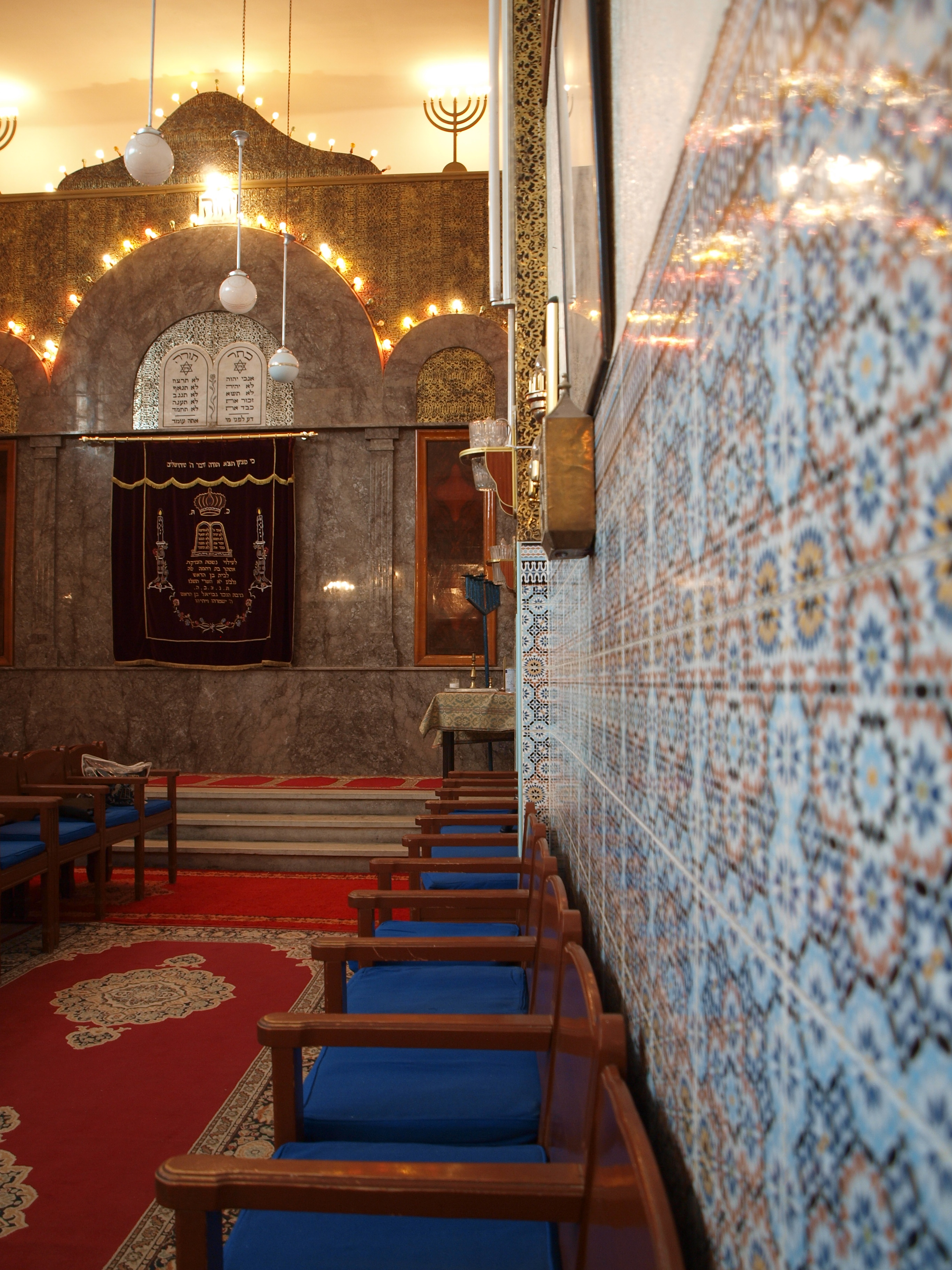
The Slat al-Azama Synagogue in Marrakesh

For a while, the mellah of Fez remained the only one. The second mellah was only created in the second half of the 16th century in Marrakesh, which by then had replaced Fez as the capital of Morocco under the new Saadian dynasty. Here too the Jewish population of the city had lived alongside the Muslim population. Many of them had come from the Atlas Mountain regions and from the nearby city of Aghmat, where a much older Jewish community had already existed.

The Jewish district at the time was concentrated in what is now the Mouassine neighbourhood. In 1557-58 CE sultan Moulay Abdallah al-Ghalib ordered that the Jewish population of the city relocate from here to an area next to the royal Kasbah (citadel), and construction of the new Mellah of Marrakesh was probably finished around 1562-63. The political motivations for this may have been similar to those of the Marinids in creating the Mellah of Fez, which served as a precedent followed by the Saadian dynasty. Additionally, however, Moulay Abdallah appeared to have been planning the creation of new "model" Muslim neighbourhoods in the city, centered around the new Mouassine Mosque which he immediately built on the newly-liberated land of the old Jewish neighbourhood. Another factor for the move may have been the rapid growth of the Jewish population due to the influx of Jewish migrants from Fez and other towns seeking economic opportunities in the capital. Incidentally, the new Mellah was indeed quite large and functioned as a city unto itself, with its own services and facilities. Despite this, some historical references indicate that Jews may have still been living in other parts of the city in the decades after the Mellah's creation.

A Frenchman, who was held captive in Morocco from 1670 to 1681, wrote: "In Fez and in Morocco [that is, Marrakesh], the Jews are separated from the inhabitants, having their own quarters set apart, surrounded by walls of which the gates are guarded by men appointed by the King ... In the other towns, they are intermingled with the Moors." In 1791, a European traveller described the Marrakesh mellah: "It has two large gates, which are regularly shut every evening about nine o'clock, after which time no person whatever is permitted to enter or go out... till... the following morning. The Jews have a market of their own...".

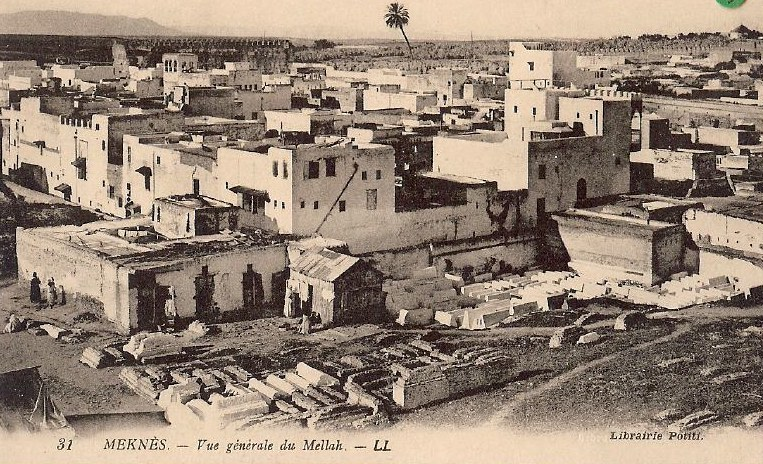
Mellah of Meknes in 1922

The third mellah of Morocco wasn't created until 1682, when the Alaouite sultan Moulay Isma'il moved the Jewish population of Meknes, his new capital, to a new district on the southwest side of the city, next to the vast new royal citadel that he was building for himself there.

In Fez, the 17th century saw a significant influx of Jews from the Tadla region and from the Sous Valley arriving under the reigns of the Alaouite sultans Moulay Rashid and Moulay Isma'il, respectively. A serious disaster, however, took place in 1790 to 1792 during a period of general turmoil for the city under Sultan Moulay Yazid. During these two years the sultan forced the entire Jewish community to move to the outlying Kasbah Cherarda on the other side of Fes el-Jdid. The Mellah was occupied by tribal troops allied to him, its synagogue was replaced by a mosque, and the Jewish cemetery and its contents were moved to a cemetery near Bab Guissa. Moreover, Moulay Yazid permanently reduced the size of the district by demolishing the old city walls around it and rebuilding them along a much smaller perimeter. It was only after the sultan's death that the chief Muslim qadi (judge) of Fez ordered the Mellah to be restored to the Jewish community, along with the demolition of the mosque built by Yazid's troops.

=== 19th century ===
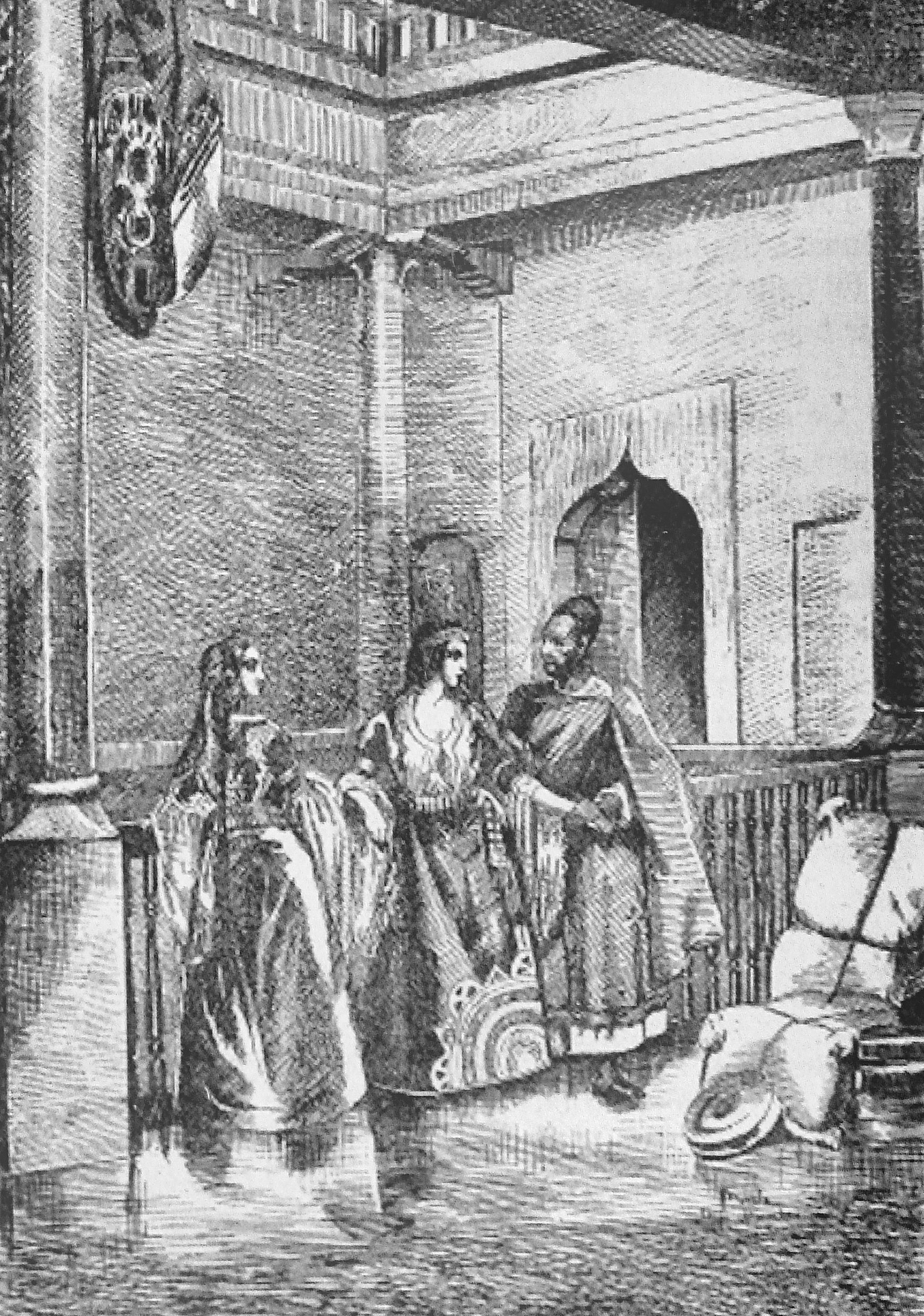
A Jewish house in Essaouira, by Darondeau (1807–1841)

In the mid 19th century, commercial development and European economic penetration brought prosperity to many Jewish merchants in northern Moroccan ports, but cost many Jews in the interior their traditional livelihoods, as industrial imports from Europe drove traditional Jewish crafts out of the market. As a result, Moroccan Jews started migrating from the interior to coastal cities such as Essaouira, Mazagan, Asfi, and later Casablanca for economic opportunity, participating in trade with Europeans and the development of those cities. Some impoverished migrants to overpopulated urban mellahs (Jewish quarters) struggled to survive as shopkeepers, peddlers, artisans or beggars.

(In Tetouan, the Spanish word judería was later used as the name of the district.)

The mellah in Rabat was established in 1808 by Sultan Mawlay Sulaiman; this separated the Jewish and Muslim people who had lived together in a shared area of the city. In Salé, the new Jewish quarter was a long avenue with a total of 200 houses, 20 shops and trading booths, two kilns and two mills. In 1865, the mellah of Essaouira, having become over-populated, was permitted to extend.

During this century, the fortunes of the Jewish community of Fez in particular improved considerably as the expansion of contact and trade with Europe allowed the Jewish merchant class to place themselves at the center of international trade networks in Morocco. This also led to a greater social openness and a shift in tastes and attitudes, especially among richer Jews, who built luxurious residences in the upper parts of the Mellah there.

The Mellah of Casablanca was located in the southern part of the city's Medina, between Bab es-Souq and Bab Marrakesh. Unlike older mellah quarters in other cities, the Mellah of Casablanca was not separated from the rest of the Medina by a wall or a gate, and there was an area at the periphery inhabited by both Jews and Muslims. The street called Rue des Synagogues also had mosques and zawiyas.

=== 20th century onwards ===
In the early twentieth century affluent Jews started to move to the new neighborhoods (Villes nouvelles) planned along European urban schemes, leaving in the mellahs only the elderly and the poorest families.

Since the establishment of the State of Israel in 1948, almost all Moroccan Jews, for a variety of reasons, have emigrated either to the new Jewish state or to countries like France and Canada—some in government-coordinated programs such as Operation Yachin, some fleeing persecution, some for religious reasons, and some encouraged by the Jewish Agency. As a result, nowadays mellahs are only inhabited by Muslims, the few remaining Jews have moved to modern quarters of Moroccan towns. The changing economy of Morocco has also meant that the majority of Moroccan Jews now live in the modern metropolis of Casablanca, with an estimated 5,000 living there in 1997 (with only 150 living in Fez, by comparison).

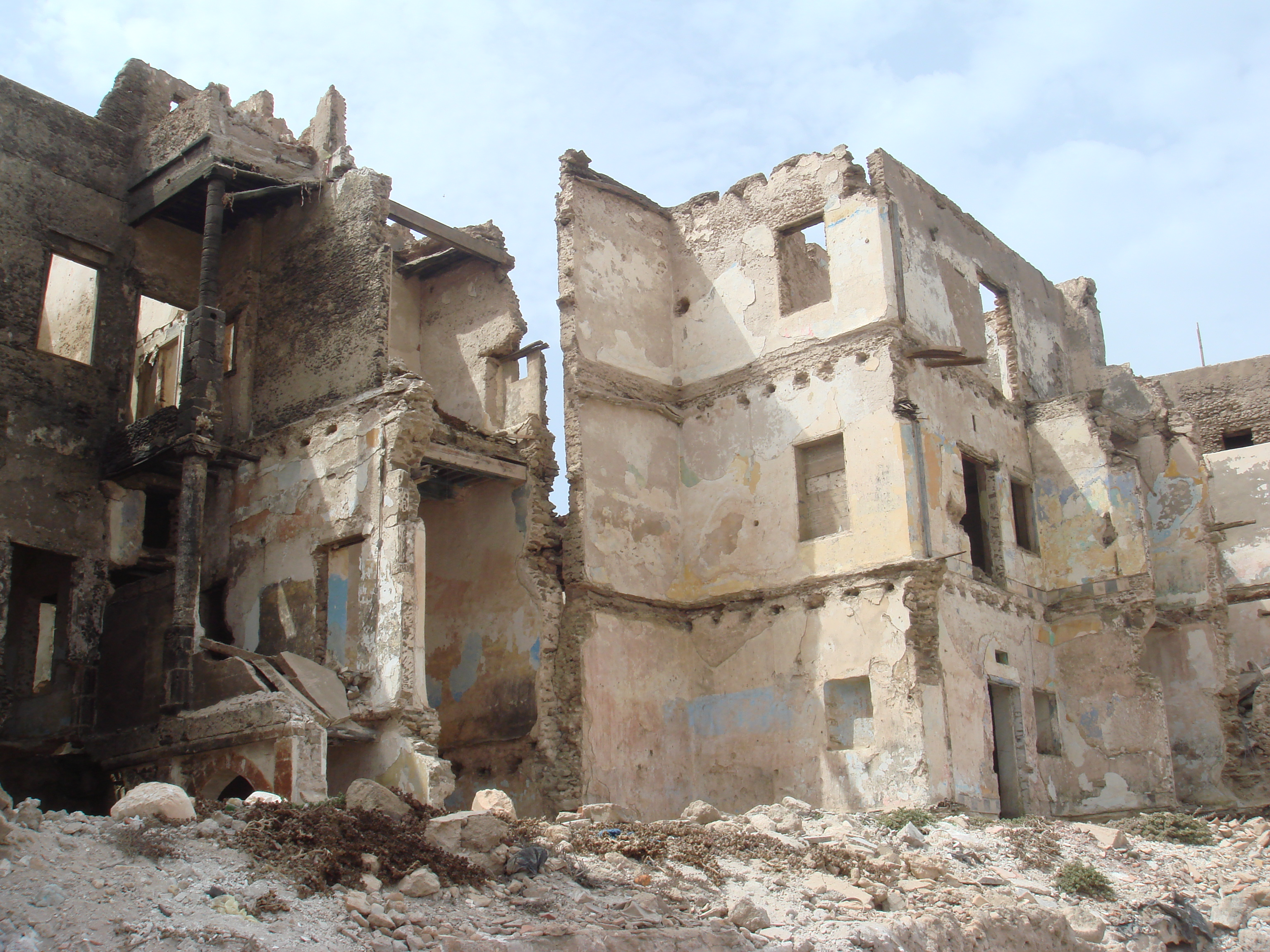
Most of the Jews of Essaouira left after 1948 Due to poor drainage and invasive seawater, abandoned buildings fell into disrepair and dilapidation, as seen in this image from 2009.

In Marrakesh, parts of the mellah are showing signs of the gentrification in the 21st century. Only three Jewish families remain in the Mellah, with one of them taking care of the Slat al-Azama Synagogue, one of the few remaining in the area. The Mellah of Fez faces a similar fate; however, it is currently undergoing renovation thanks to UNESCO funding.

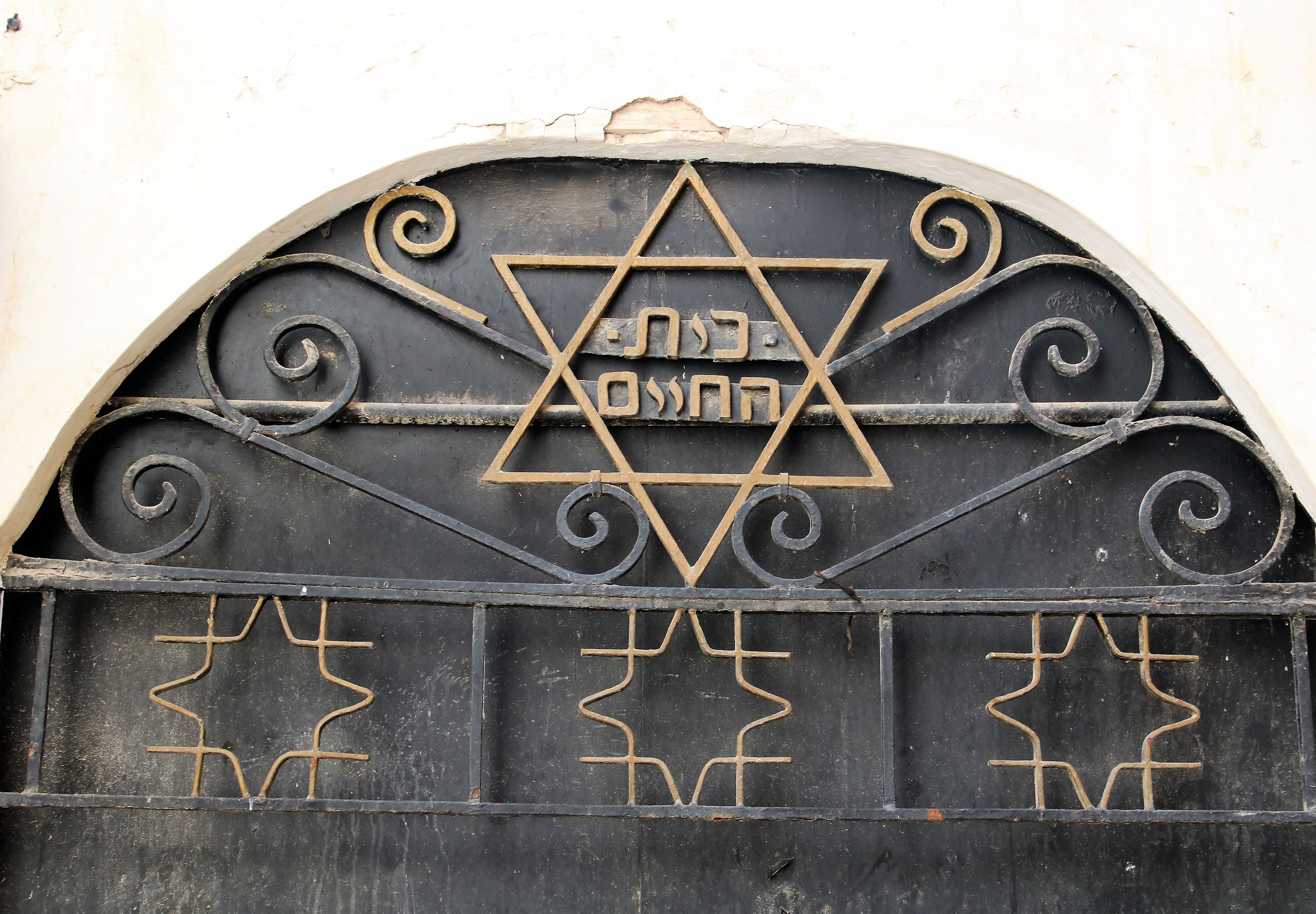
Detail of the gate of the Jewish cemetery of the Mellah of Fez

The legacy of the Moroccan Jewish districts on commerce remain, as the markets constructed and brought alive by Jewish merchants not only exist as of 2014 but still in the lively forms they served in previous centuries for the Jewish communities. The former mellahs continue to be visited as historical sites. One writer notes: "The quarters’ squalor still exists, but they’re also picturesque and bustling — and that, too, speaks to Morocco’s vibrant Jewish past."

== Culture ==
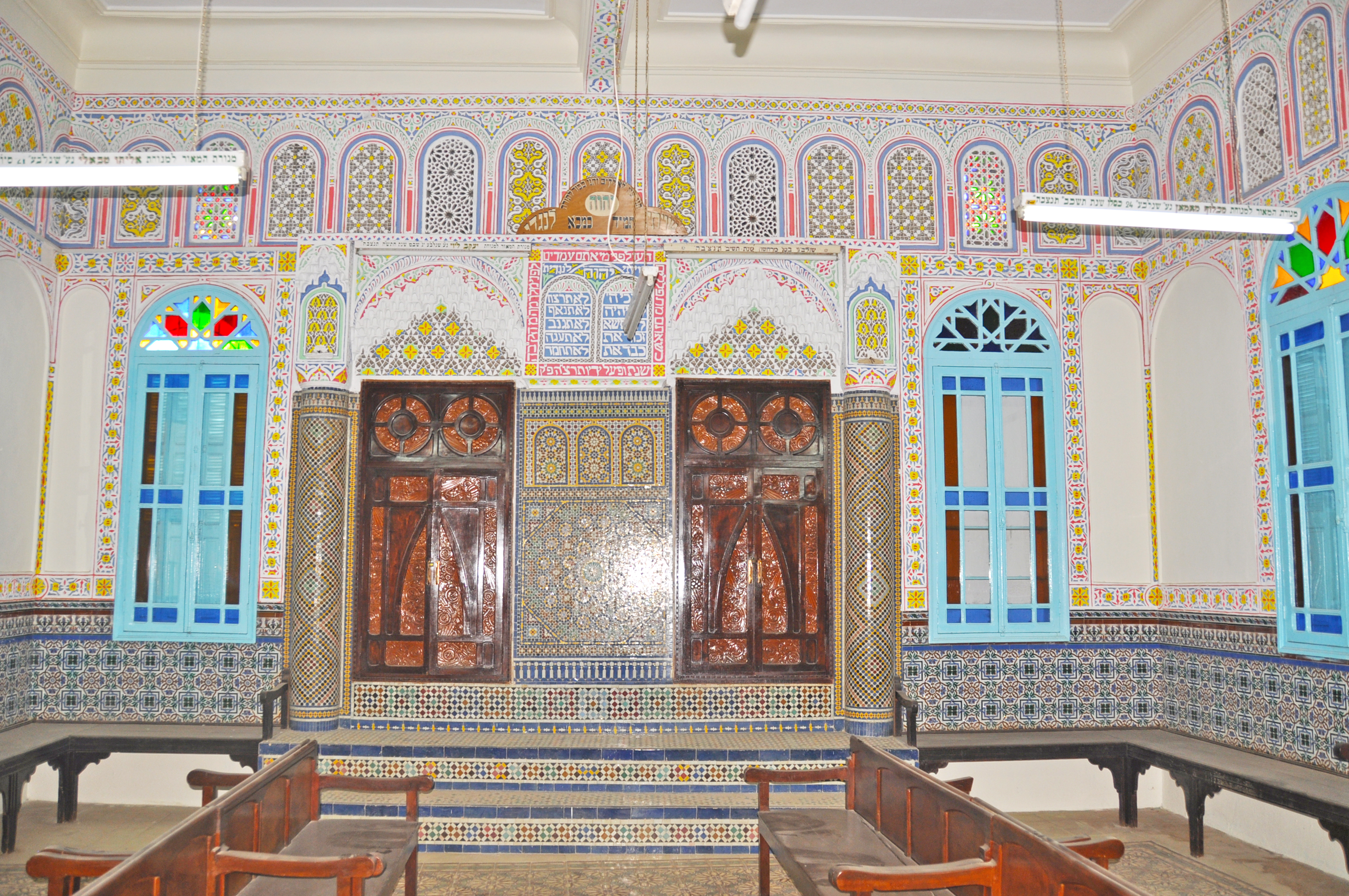
A preserved synagogue in Sefrou

While the settling location of Jews was typically imposed by Muslim rulers, the mellah existed in a relatively autonomous fashion, with Jews building and sustaining their own communities within the walls of their quarter. Indeed, there was resistance to forced relocation, but ultimately the Jewish mellah became a sanctified space that the Jews had pride for.

"The one gate that gave way to the medina, which could have easily been repudiated as an emblem of imprisonment, instead came to be treated as an object of reverence by the mellah ’s inhabitants, as we see in this description from the early twentieth century: If one stops for a moment in front of this gate, one sees a curious thing: All who pass, children, beggars, peddlers driving their donkeys loaded with merchandise, old women, hunched-over men, all approach this dusty wall and press their lips against it with as much fervor as if they were kissing the holy Torah."

The mellahs of Morocco primarily came about as Jews migrated to Morocco after being expelled from the Iberian Peninsula during the Spanish Inquisition. There were two primary justifications given for mellahization. First, these Jewish quarters were often in close proximity to the ruling local powers, offering a form of protection for the Jews. This explanation also addresses the resulting effective authority over differing religious populations; if all the Jews are physically together, it is easier to maintain effective Muslim rule, assess taxes, and keep count of the community. The second justification for the institution of the mellah is the idea that mellahs were a "collective punishment for specific transgressions." Jews were associated with ethical deviance, physical malformation, and disease and so were separated from the Christian and Muslim populations. Organization relative to the city as a whole gives insight into how Jews were situated compared to the Muslim majority and how relevant these justifications were to specific mellahs. As Gilson Miller et al write:

"Sometimes the quarter is contained within the larger city and forms a microcosm of it, such as the Jewish quarter of Tetuan; at other times, it is removed from the molecular city and attached to the royal enclave, as in Fez. The siting of the quarter invites speculation about its origins and the relationship between the Jewish minority and the Muslim majority. Was the purpose of the quarter to isolate its inhabitants, to safeguard them, or both? In Fez, the proximity of the mellah to the royal palace is often read as a sign of dependency of the Jews on the power and protection of the ruling sovereign."

== Physical space and cultural interaction ==
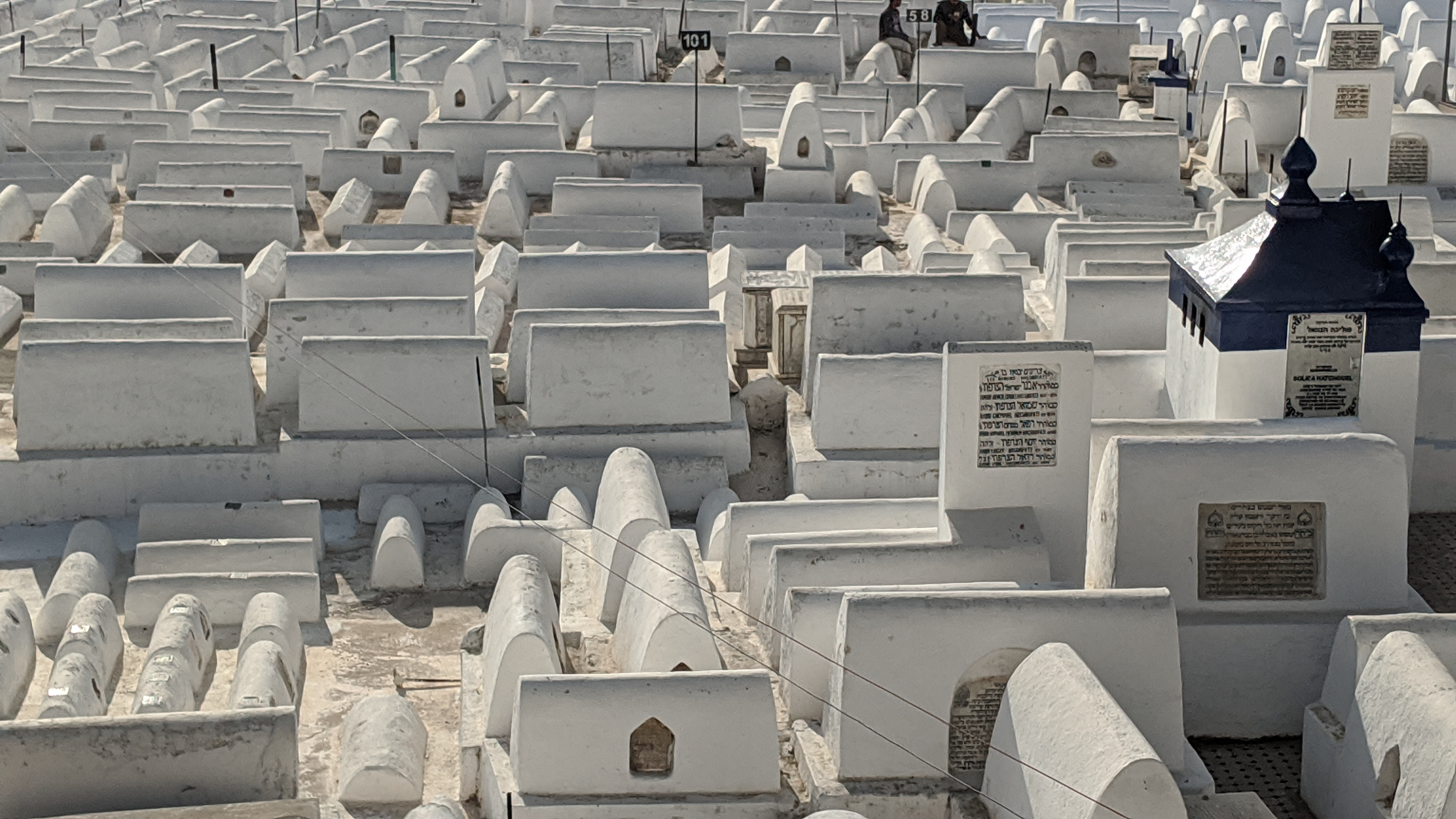
The Jewish Cemetery in the Mellah of Fez

Mellahs, walled on all four sides and typically gated, housed the Jewish population of Moroccan cities. As a result, these spaces fostered Jewish communal life through its physical structures. Mellahs were typically organized in neighborhoods and had synagogues, a Jewish cemetery, and kosher markets situated among other public areas. Even the synagogue itself facilitated a wide variety of Jewish communal needs including education, ritual baths, and spaces for children to play. While at first these quarters offered considerable comfort to Jewish families, with spacious homes and protection due to proximity to the royal palace these luxuries soon came to a close.

"Yet over time, the quarters’ narrow streets became congested and overrun with people, and they became synonymous with ghettos. The Jews were confined to the inner walls of the rundown mellahs, and the areas became associated with cursed, “salted” land, much like the Jews were perceived among Moroccan society."

As Jews were key players in trade and commerce, mellahs were often situated on major waterways and were usually pretty close to each other to facilitate trade networks effectively. Even more so, the mellah's market became a prominent space for not only the Jewish community, but non-Jewish peoples who would come to shop on market days. Because Jews commonly held merchant and artisan positions, the mellah was an attractive trade post for the entire city, not just the Jewish quarter. Separation certainly stifled cultural interaction to some degree, but Muslims were allowed to enter the mellah and did so if they needed goods and services that fell within the Jewish niche.

== See also ==
- History of the Jews in Morocco
- Aljama
- Al Wifaq
- Ghetto
- Jewish Quarter
