= Anathema =

Term for something or someone vehemently hated or banned

The word anathema has two main meanings. One is something or someone hated or avoided. The other is something or someone that has been formally excommunicated by a church. These meanings come from the New Testament, where an anathema was a person or thing cursed or condemned by God.

== Etymology ==
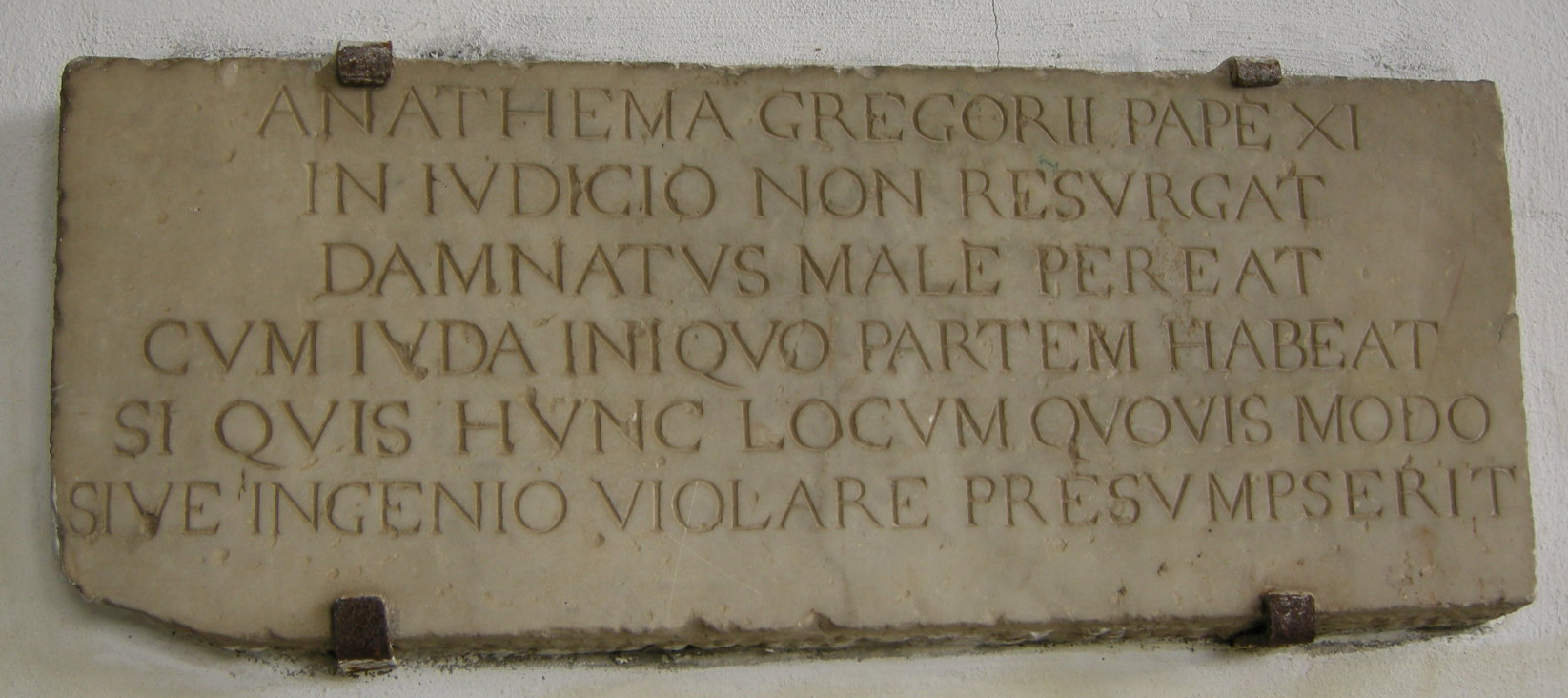
Anathema (in the sense of a curse) attributed to Pope Gregory XI

Anathema derives from Ancient Greek ἀνάθεμα, anáthema, meaning "an offering" or "anything dedicated", itself derived from the verb ἀνατίθημι, anatíthēmi, meaning "to offer up". The Greek plural is anathemata. In the Old Testament, חֵרֶם (chērem) referred to both objects consecrated to divine use and those dedicated to destruction in the Lord's name, such as enemies and their weapons during religious wars. Since weapons of the enemy were considered unholy, the meaning became "anything dedicated to evil" or "a curse".

In New Testament usage a different meaning developed. St. Paul used the word anathema to signify a curse and the forced expulsion of one from the community of Christians. By the 6th century, the liturgical meaning evolved again to mean a formal ecclesiastical curse of excommunication and the condemnation of heretical doctrines, the severest form of separation from the Christian church issued against a heretic or group of heretics by a Pope or other church official. The phrase Latin: anathema sit ("let him be anathema"), echoing Galatians 1:8–9, was thus used in decrees of councils defining Christian faith.

Examples include:

- "It's no wonder then, that Paul calls down God's curse, God's anathema, His ban on those behind their potential defection from Christ."
- "He shrank from the venerable saint as if to avoid an anathema."
- "In 1054, an anathema was issued by Rome against the Eastern Patriarch who then issued another one against the cardinal who delivered it."

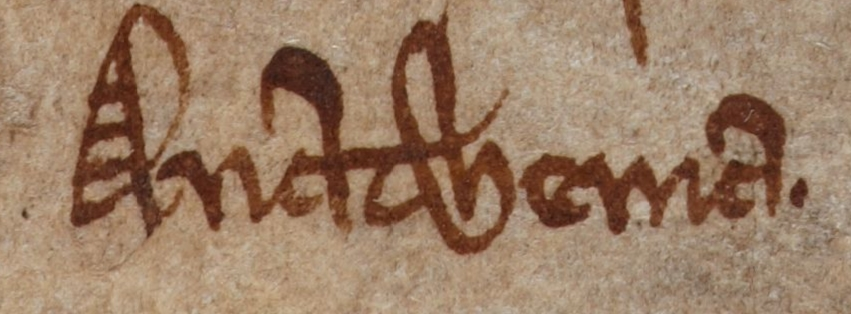
A mention of anathema in the Southwick Codex, a medieval manuscript in Old English

In 1526, the word anathema appeared in modern English for the first time and was used in the sense of "something accursed". The "consecrated object" meaning was also adopted a short time later, but is no longer widely used. Its most common modern usage is in secular contexts where it is used to mean something or someone that is detested or shunned.

Examples include:

- "Racial hatred was anathema to her."
- "The idea that one would voluntarily inject poison into one's body was anathema to me."
- "This notion was anathema to most of his countrymen."

== Religious usage ==
The Old Testament applied the word to anything set aside for sacrifice, and thus banned from profane use and dedicated to destruction—as, in the case of religious wars, the enemy and their cities and possessions. The New Testament uses the word to mean a curse and forced expulsion of someone from the Christian community.

=== Judaism ===
The Septuagint uses the Greek word ἀνάθεμα (anathema), meaning something offered to a divinity, to render the Hebrew word חרם (herem). The word appears in verses such as Leviticus 27:28 to refer to things that are offered to God and so banned for common (non-religious) use. The Hebrew word was also used for what was devoted, by virtue of a simple vow, not to the Lord, but to the priest. According to the Jewish Encyclopedia (1901–1906), with the rise of the synagogue as the organizing principle of Jewish life circa the Maccabean period, the sense of the word herem changed from "an instrument of communal purification" to "an instrument for the promotion of personal conduct as well as the enforcement of public morality [...] an instrument of ecclesiastical discipline".

=== New Testament ===
The noun ἀνάθεμα (anathema) occurs in the Greek New Testament six times, and frequently in the Septuagint (Greek Old Testament). Its meaning in the New Testament is "disfavour of God", and is used both of the sentence of disfavour, as in Acts 23:14, and to the object of God's disfavour, as in the other cited places.

=== Early Church ===
Since the time of the apostles, the term 'anathema' has come to mean a form of extreme religious sanction, known as excommunication. The earliest recorded instance of the form is in the Council of Elvira (c. 306), and thereafter it became the common method of cutting off heretics; for example, the Synod of Gangra (c. 340) pronounced that Manicheanism was anathema. Cyril of Alexandria issued twelve anathemas against Nestorius in 431. In the fifth century, a formal distinction between anathema and "minor" excommunication evolved, where "minor" excommunication entailed cutting off a person or group from the rite of Eucharist and attendance at worship, while anathema meant a complete separation of the subject from the Church.

=== Catholicism ===
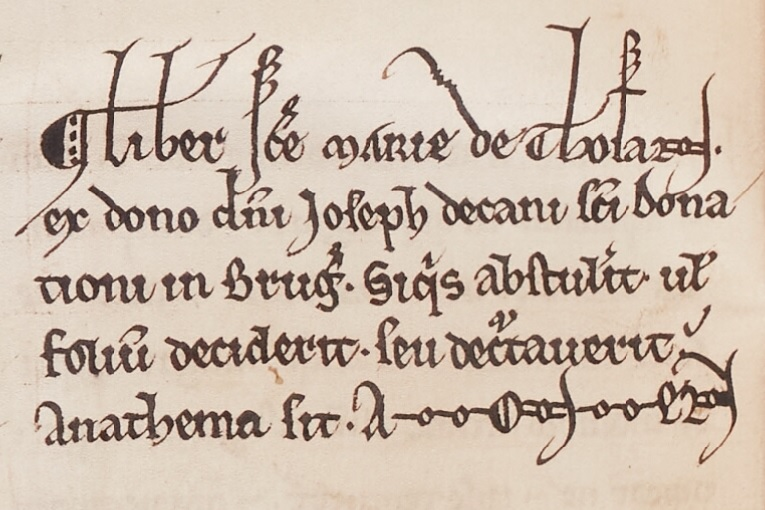
Anathema or curse in a 12th–13th century manuscript of the Ter Doest abbey

In the dogmatic canons of all the ecumenical councils recognized by the Catholic Church that use the word anathema, the word "anathema" signifies exclusion from the society of the faithful because of heresy. Documents of the 9th and 12th centuries distinguish anathema from excommunication, a distinction later clarified by using the term "major excommunication" for exclusion from the society of the faithful, and "minor excommunication" for ordinary excommunication or exclusion from reception of the sacraments.

Although in the canons of ecumenical councils the word "anathema" continued to be used to mean exclusion for heresy from the society of the faithful, the word was also used to signify a major excommunication inflicted with particular solemnity. Anathema, in this sense, was a major excommunication pronounced with the ceremonies described in the article bell, book, and candle, which were reserved for the gravest crimes.

The 1917 Roman Code of Canon Law abandoned the distinction between major and minor excommunication (which continues in use among the Eastern Catholic Churches) and abolished all penalties of whatever kind envisaged in previous canonical legislation but not included in the Code. It defined excommunication as exclusion from the communion of the faithful and said that excommunication "is also called anathema, especially if inflicted with the solemnities described in the Pontificale Romanum."

The 1983 Code of Canon Law, which is now in force, does not contain the word "anathema", and the Pontificale Romanum, as revised after the Second Vatican Council, no longer mentions any particular solemnities associated with the infliction of excommunication.

=== Eastern Orthodoxy ===
The Eastern Orthodox Church distinguishes between epitemia (penances) laid on a person, one form of which is "separation from the communion of the Church" (excommunication), and anathema. While undergoing epitemia, the person remains an Orthodox Christian, even though their participation in the mystical life of the church is restricted; but those given over to anathema are considered completely torn from the Church until they repent. Epitemia, or excommunication, is normally limited to a specified period of time—though it always depends on evidence of repentance by the one serving the penance. The lifting of anathema, however, depends solely on the repentance of the one condemned. The two causes for which a person may be anathematized are heresy and schism. Anathematization is only a last resort, and must always be preceded by pastoral attempts to reason with the offender and bring about their restoration.

For the Orthodox, anathema is not final damnation. God alone is the judge of the living and the dead, and up until the moment of death repentance is always possible. The purpose of public anathema is twofold: to warn the one condemned and bring about his repentance, and to warn others away from his error. Everything is done for the purpose of the salvation of souls.

On the First Sunday of Great Lent—the "Sunday of Orthodoxy"—the church celebrates the Rite of Orthodoxy, at which anathemas are pronounced against numerous heresies. This rite commemorates the end of Byzantine Iconoclasm—the last great heresy to trouble the church (all subsequent heresies—so far—merely being restatements in one form or another of previous errors)—at the Council of Constantinople in 843. The Synodicon, or decree, of the council was publicly proclaimed on this day, including an anathema against not only Iconoclasm but also of previous heresies. The Synodicon continues to be proclaimed annually, together with additional prayers and petitions in cathedrals and major monasteries throughout the Eastern Orthodox Churches. During the rite (which is also known as the "Triumph of Orthodoxy"), lections are read from Romans 16:17–20, which directs the church to "mark them which cause divisions and offenses contrary to the doctrine you have learned, and avoid them. For they ... by good words and fair speeches deceive the hearts of the simple," and Matthew 18:10–18, which recounts the parable of the Good Shepherd, and provides the procedure to follow in dealing with those who err:

"... if thy brother shall trespass against thee, go and tell him his fault between thee and him alone: if he shall hear thee, thou hast gained thy brother. But if he will not hear thee, then take with thee one or two more, that in the mouth of two or three witnesses every word may be established. And if he shall neglect to hear them, tell it unto the church: but if he shall neglect to hear the church, let him be unto thee as a heathen man and a publican. Verily I say unto you, whatever ye shall bind on earth shall be bound in heaven; and whatsoever ye shall loose on earth shall be loosed in heaven."

After an ektenia (litany), during which petitions are offered that God will have mercy on those who err and bring them back to the truth, and that he will "make hatred, enmity, strife, vengeance, falsehood and all other abominations to cease, and cause true love to reign in our hearts", the bishop (or abbot) says a prayer during which he beseeches God to: "look down now upon Thy Church, and behold how that, though we have joyously received the Gospel of salvation, we are but stony ground. For the thorns of vanity and the tares of the passions make it to bear but little fruit in certain places and none in others, and with the increase in iniquity, some, opposing the truth of Thy Gospel by heresy, and others by schism, do fall away from Thy dignity, and rejecting Thy grace, they subject themselves to the judgment of Thy most holy word. O most merciful and almighty Lord ... be merciful unto us; strengthen us in the right Faith by Thy power, and with Thy divine light illumine the eyes of those in error, that they may come to know Thy truth. Soften the hardness of their hearts and open their ears, that they may hear Thy voice and turn to Thee, our Saviour. O Lord, set aside their division and correct their life, which doth not accord with Christian piety. ... Endue the pastors of Thy Church with holy zeal, and so direct their care for the salvation and conversion of those in error with the spirit of the Gospel that, guided by Thee, we may all attain to that place where is the perfect faith, fulfillment of hope, and true love ...." The protodeacon then proclaims the Synodicon, anathematizing various heresies and lauding those who have remained constant in the dogma and Holy Tradition of the Church.

== See also ==
- Cherem
- Christian excommunication
- Shunning
- Disconnection
- Ostracism (present-day)
- Bell, book, and candle
