= Harem Scarem (disambiguation) =

Harem Scarem is a Canadian melodic rock band.

Harem Scarem may also refer to:

== Music ==
- Harem Scarem (folk band), a Scottish folk band
- Harem Scarem (Australian band), a rock band
- Harem Scarem (album), a 1991 album by the Canadian band Harem Scarem
- "Harem Scarem", a song by Focus from the 1974 album Hamburger Concerto

== Film ==
- Harem Scarem (1927 film), a William M. Pizor film production
- Harem Scarem, a 1928 short cartoon starring Oswald the Lucky Rabbit, an early Disney character

== See also ==
- Harum Scarum, a 1965 American musical comedy film
- Harem (disambiguation)
