= Mellah of Marrakesh =

Jewish quarter of Marrakesh, Morocco

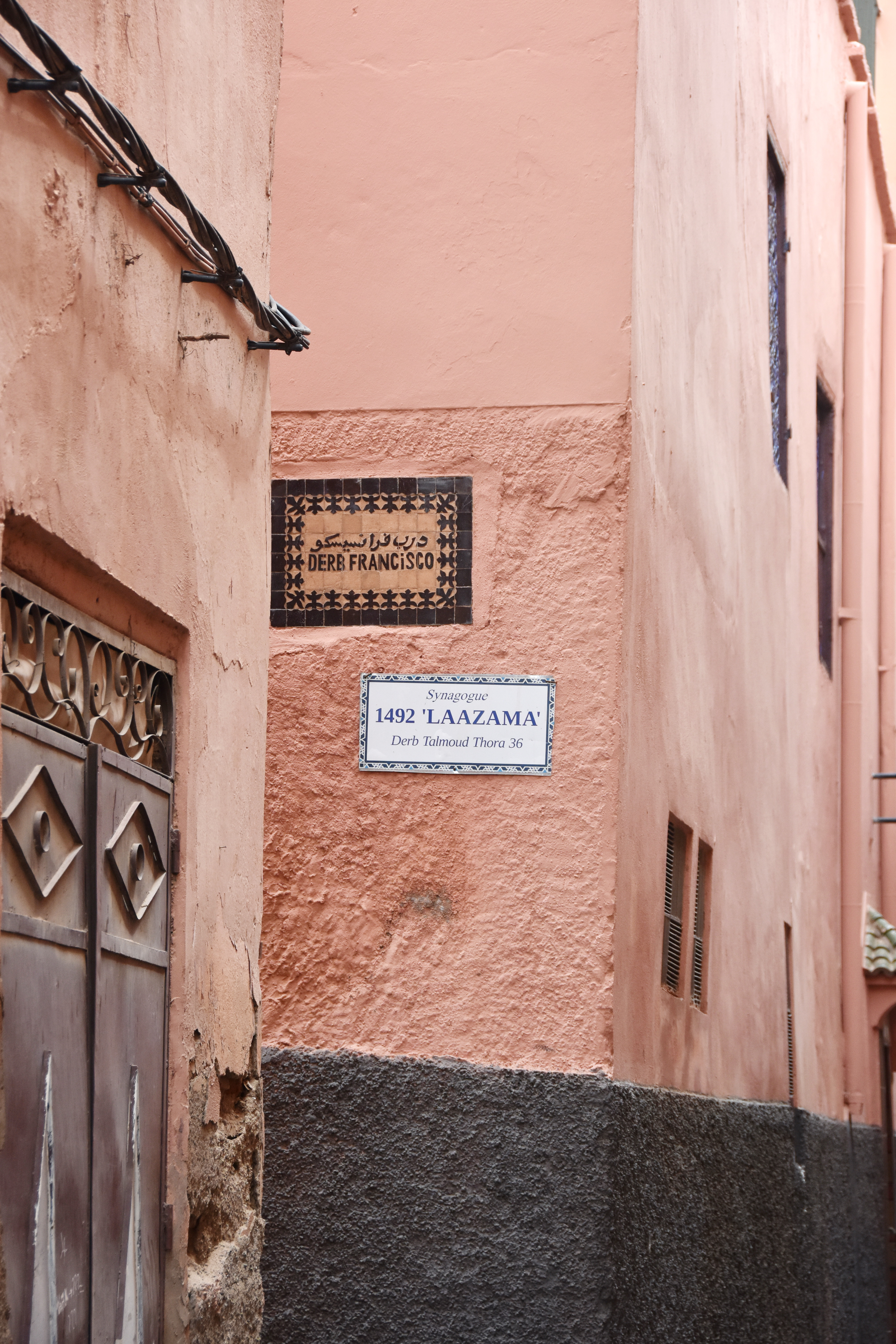
Corner of Talmud Torah and Francisco streets in the Mellah of Marrakesh.

The Mellah of Marrakesh (Hebrew: מלאח מרקש; Ladino: Mellah de Marrakesh; Arabic: ملاح مراكش), formerly known as Hay Essalam is the Jewish Quarter (Mellah) of the city of Marrakesh, Morocco. It is the second oldest of its kind in the country.

== History ==
=== Creation ===
Although the city of Marrakesh was founded by the Almoravids in 1060, Jews settled 40 km away and there is no recorded Jewish presence in the city until 1232. After the Reconquista and expulsion of Jews from the Iberian Peninsula in 1492, Sephardic Jews (known in Hebrew as the Megorashim, the Expellees) started to arrive in great numbers to Morocco, settling mostly in cities and mixing with the local Jewish population (known as the Toshavim). Many mellahs were created to protect the Jews under their dhimmi status. The Mellah of Marrakesh was created by decree of the Sultan Abdallah al-Ghalib of the Saadian dynasty in 1558, outside of the walls of El Badi Palace. During the 16th and 17th centuries, the Mellah was one of the main commercial areas of the city, and it was a walled quarter, with its gates closed at night. Many Christian merchants and foreign ambassadors preferred staying in the mellah during their visits and after the destruction of the monastery of the Franciscan mission in the mid-17th century, the Franciscans lived also in the mellah until the end of the 18th century.

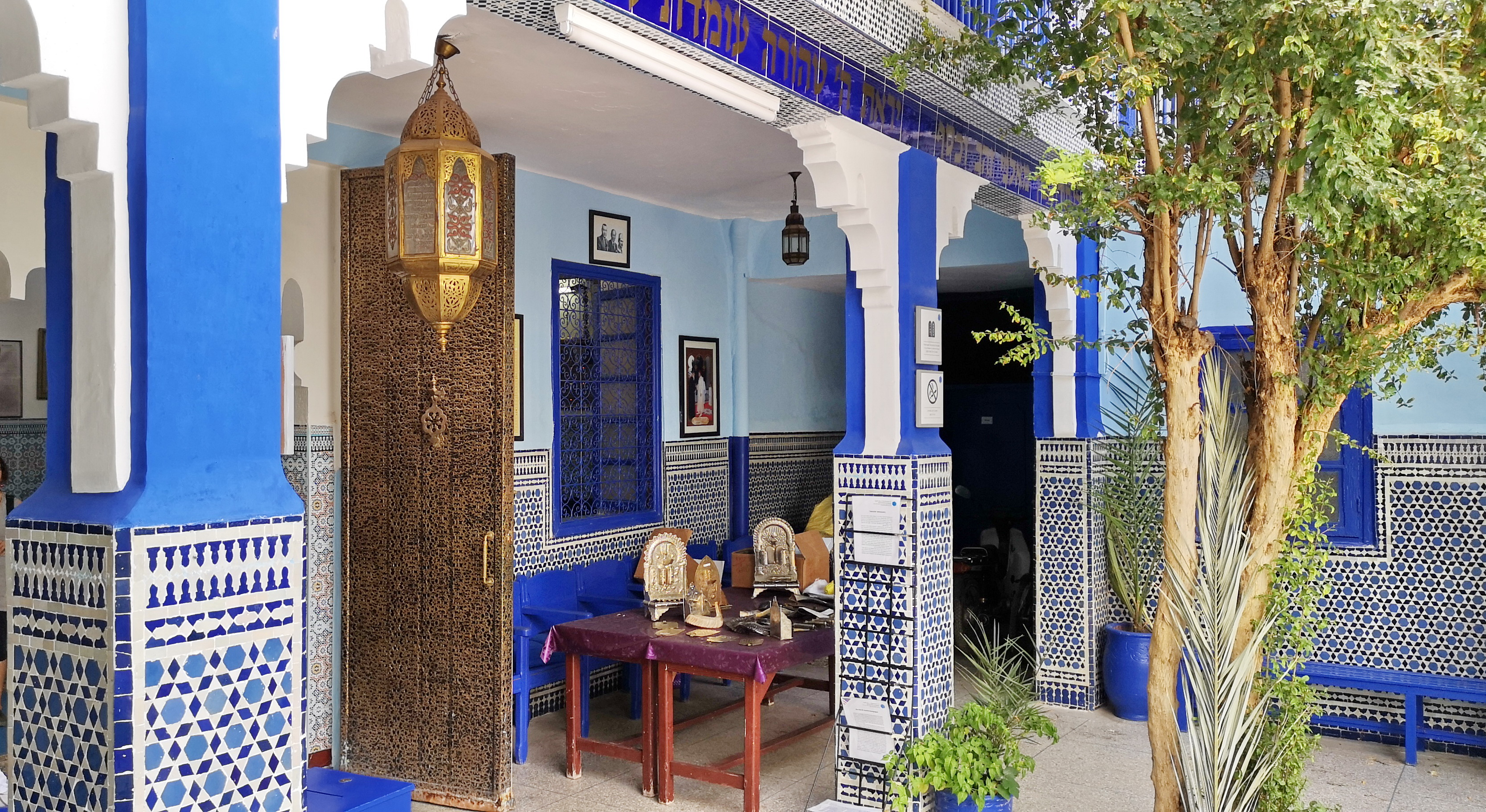
Courtyard of the Slat Al Azama synagogue.

=== Decline ===
The mellah became overpopulated within a few years. An estimated 40,000 people lived in the mellah at the peak of its population in the late 1940s. The community emigrated after the independence of Israel, the end of the French protectorate, and the Six-Day and Yom Kippur wars. Most went to Israel, but some went to France and Montreal. The Jewish population of the mellah of Marrakesh today is about 200 inhabitants.

=== Restoration ===
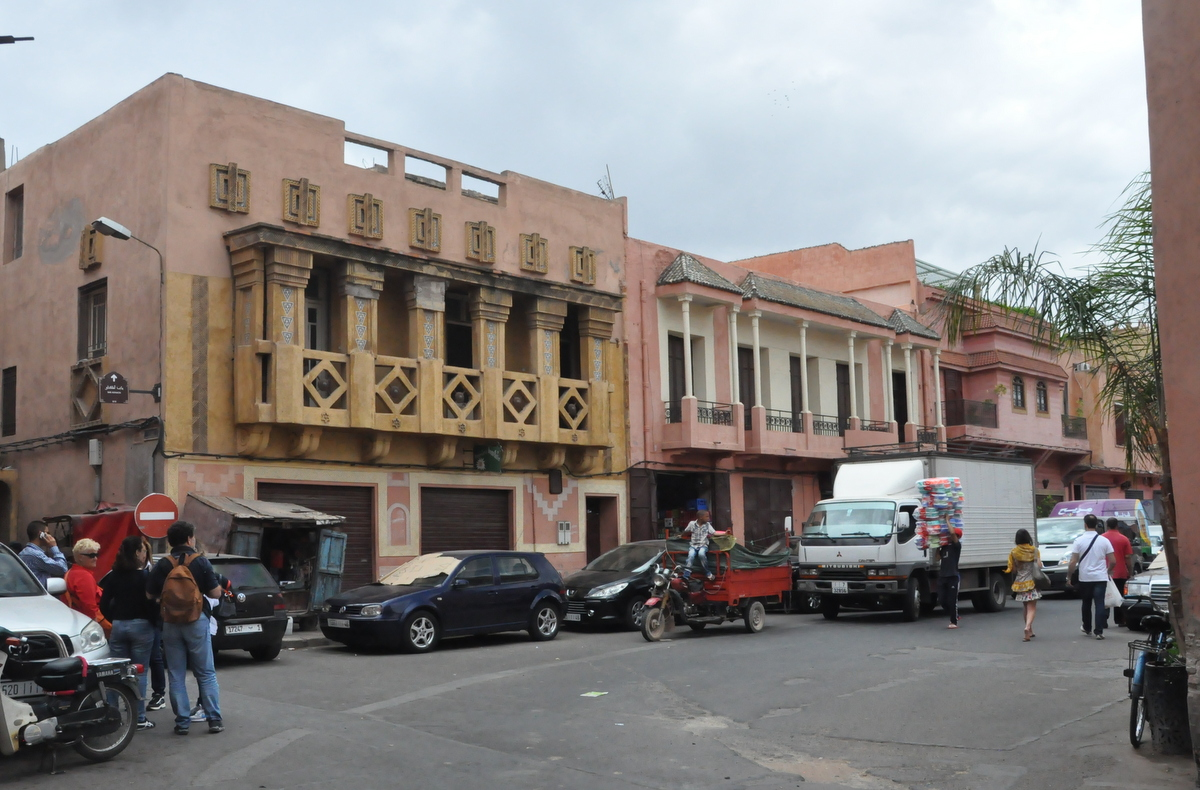
Exterior of the Joseph Bitton Synagogue (building on the left)

In 2016, King Mohamed VI ordered to restore the names of the streets that had to do with the city's Jewish heritage, including restoring the name of the neighborhood back to "El Mellah", allocating over US$20 million for the restoration of houses, streets and synagogues. In November of the same year, Zouheir Bahloul, an Arab member of the Knesset for the party Zionist Union requested funds from the Israeli government to support a synagogue located in the mellah, in an unexpected move for both the Israeli government and the Jewish Community of Morocco. Today, the mellah is one of the main tourist attractions of the city.

== Public restrictions on Jews ==
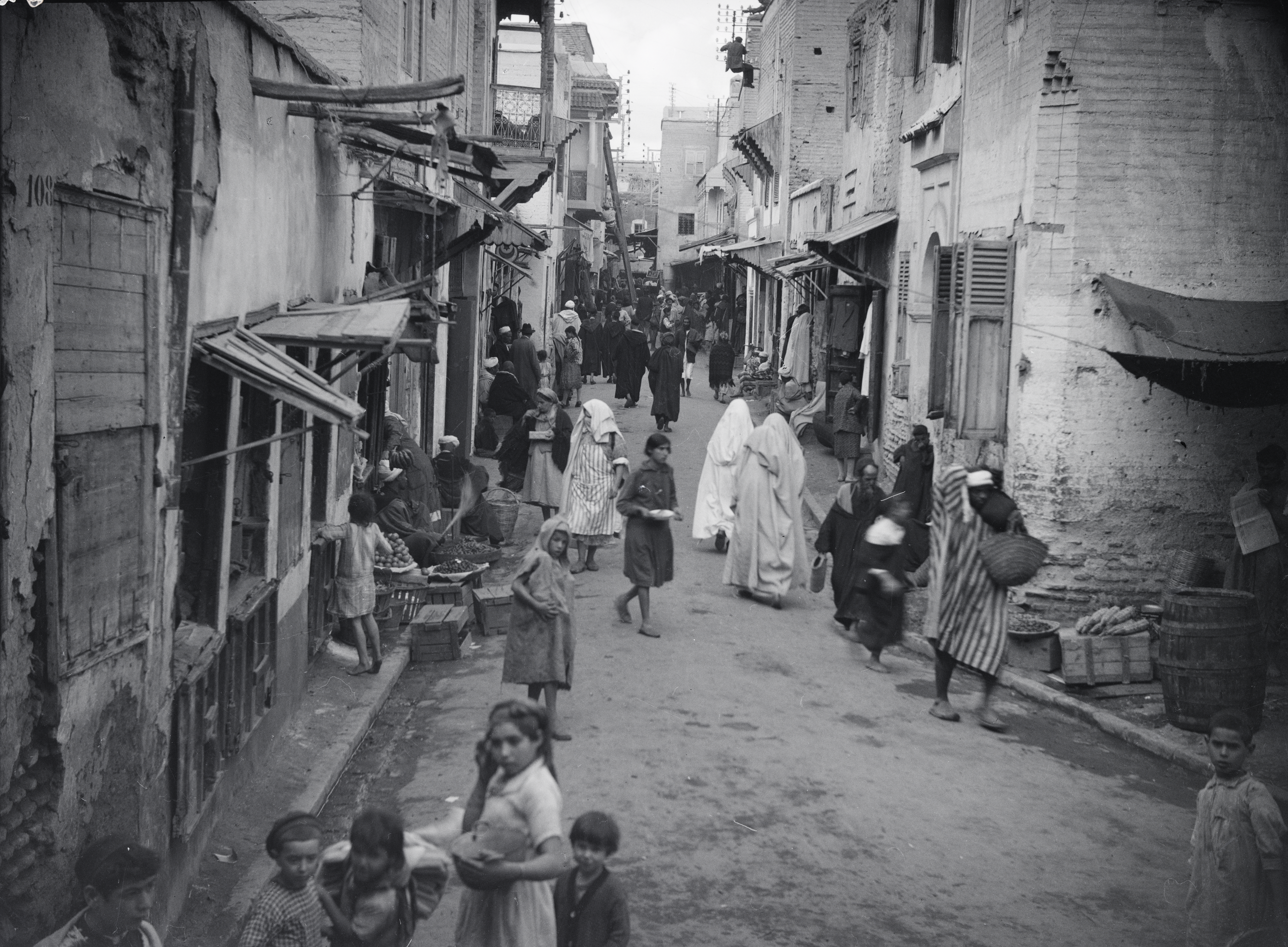
View of a street in the Mellah in 1930 or 1931

Generally, under the terms of the Pact of Umar, non-Muslims living under Islamic rule, including Jews, were subject to restrictions in their manner of dress. Similar to sumptuary laws in Europe, it was intended to preserve dress as an identifying marker of one's social class to signal to others the proper courtesies or dignities required as such, however these restrictions, which included not imitating Muslim attire, came to be regarded as humiliating. These rules were mostly not enforced. In Morocco, the rules were only applied to Jews when they were reintroduced by Mawlay Sulayman in 1815, but despite the formal reintroduction of the restrictions, their enforcement was lax in practice.

=== Prohibition on wearing shoes ===
According to some primary sources, Jews were forced to go barefoot in the city. The only source discussing the rule in the 19th century is Joseph Halévy who is unclear if the rule was enforced in the mellah. The published version of Halévy's visit to Morocco says Jews were forced to go barefoot throughout all Marrakesh, "even in the Mellah", but his handwritten notes say Jews went barefoot in "all other quarters of the city outside the mellah", and even this is crossed out, and has left some to speculate that Jews might have been forced to remove their slippers when leaving the mellah. In the 18th century William Lempriere wrote that "when they enter the Moorish town, castle, or palace, [Jews] are always compelled to be barefooted", suggesting that the rule was not enforced in the mellah.

The rule was often observed more stringently when Jews ran into political trouble, sometimes in connection with the protege system which allowed them to wear European shoes, and inflamed local resentments that Jews had become "too bold". Abdalmalik of Morocco reportedly forced the elders of the mellah to remove their slippers in the palace "in accordance with their ancient status of dhimma". The Jews were taunted all the way back to the mellah. Even when they were protected by foreign powers under the protege system local authorities required they go barefoot in certain spaces like the Kasbah.

== See also ==
- Jewish Cemetery Miâara
- Mellah of Fez
- Mellah of Casablanca
- History of the Jews in Morocco
