= Herem =

Herem may refer to:

- Herem (censure), expulsion from the Jewish community
- Herem (war or property), a belief that any property imperiling Jewish religious life should be destroyed
- Herem (priestly gift), an object that is devoted to God

== See also ==
- Haram (disambiguation)
- Harem (disambiguation)
- Ḥ-R-M
