= Jewish cemetery, Marrakesh =

Cemetery in Morocco

Jewish Cemetery of Marrakesh
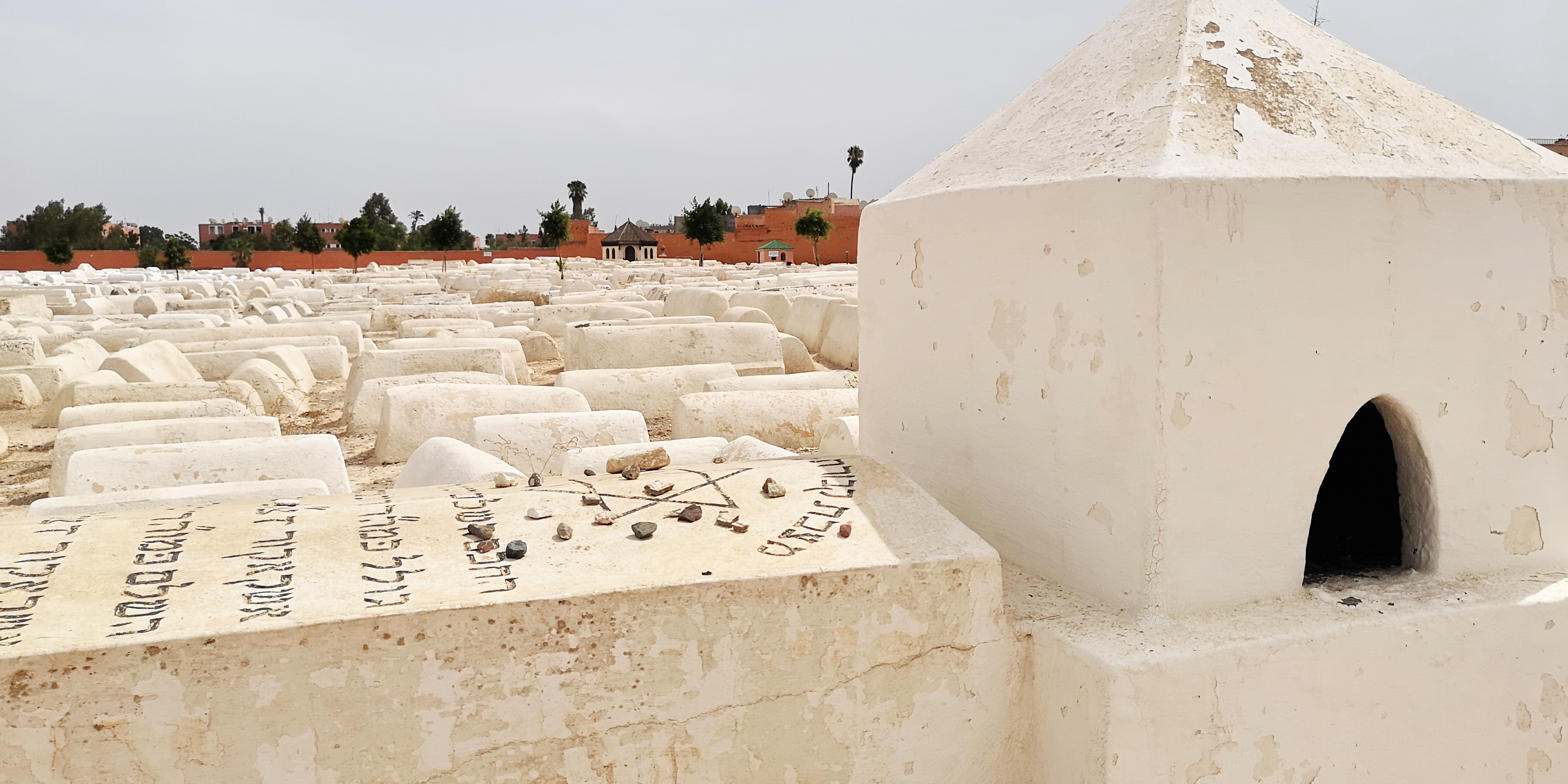
- The cemetery in the 21 century
- Interactive map of Jewish Cemetery of Marrakesh

Details
- Established: 15th century
- Location: Marrakesh
- Country: Morocco
- Coordinates: 31°37′N 7°59′W
- Size: 2,800 dunams
- No. of graves: over 20,000 graves

The Miâara Cemetery (Hebrew: בית הקברות מערה) is the Jewish Cemetery of the city of Marrakesh, Morocco. It is the largest Jewish cemetery in the country.

== History ==
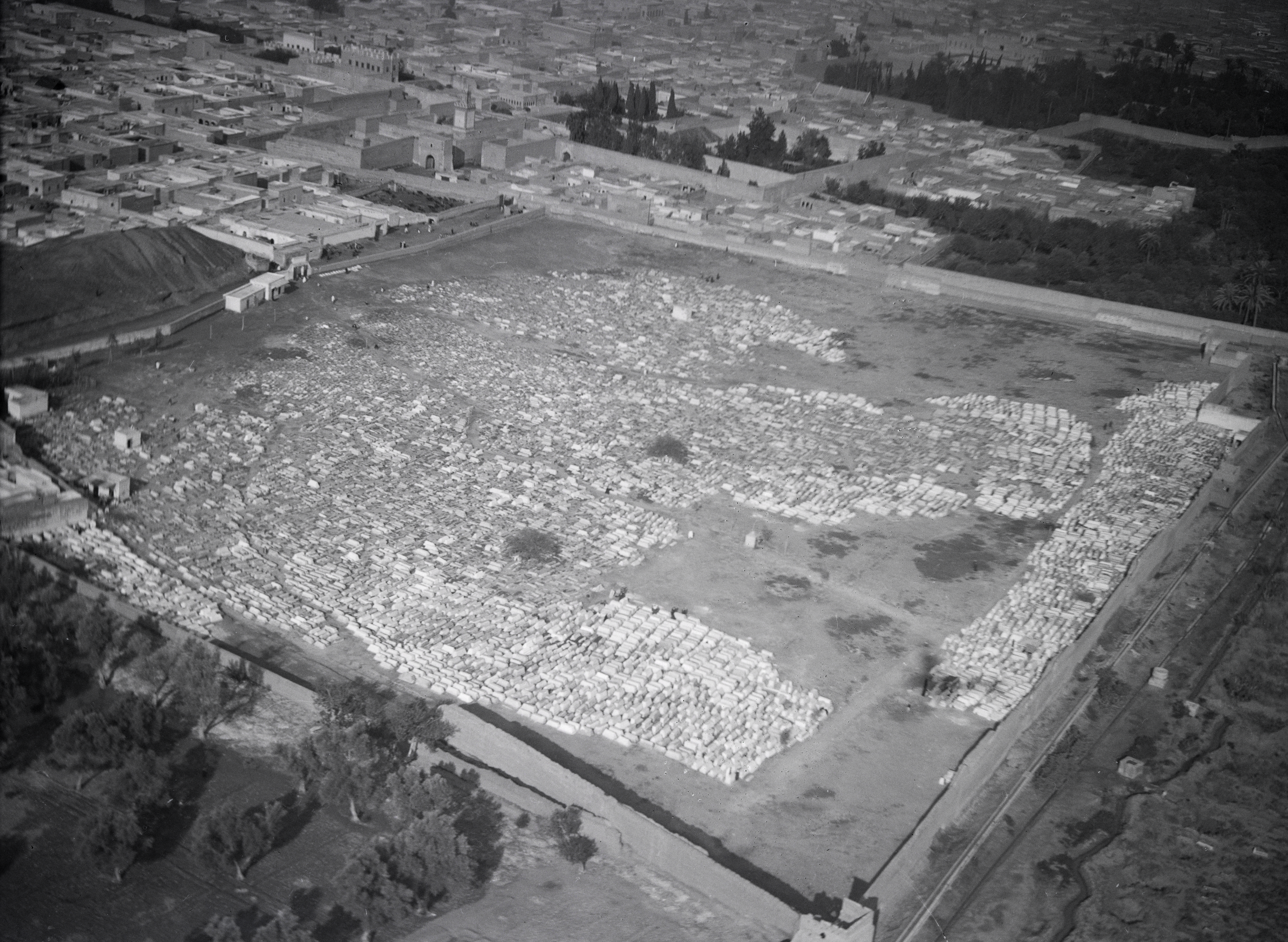
Aerial view of the Jewish Cemetery in 1930–1931

The Jewish cemetery of Marrakesh is known in Hebrew as Bet Moʿed leQol Ḥai (Hebrew: בית מועד לכל חי) or Miʿara (Hebrew: מערה), named after the street where the entrance is located. This is the ancient cemetery of Marrakesh Jewry. It is believed the area was used for burial of Jews since as early as the 12th century.

Among the rabbis of the generation who are buried there are Pinchas HaCohen, who is said to have saved the life of Thami El Glaoui, Shlomo Tammuzat, Abraham Azulai, and Rabbi Hanania HaCohen.

== Description ==
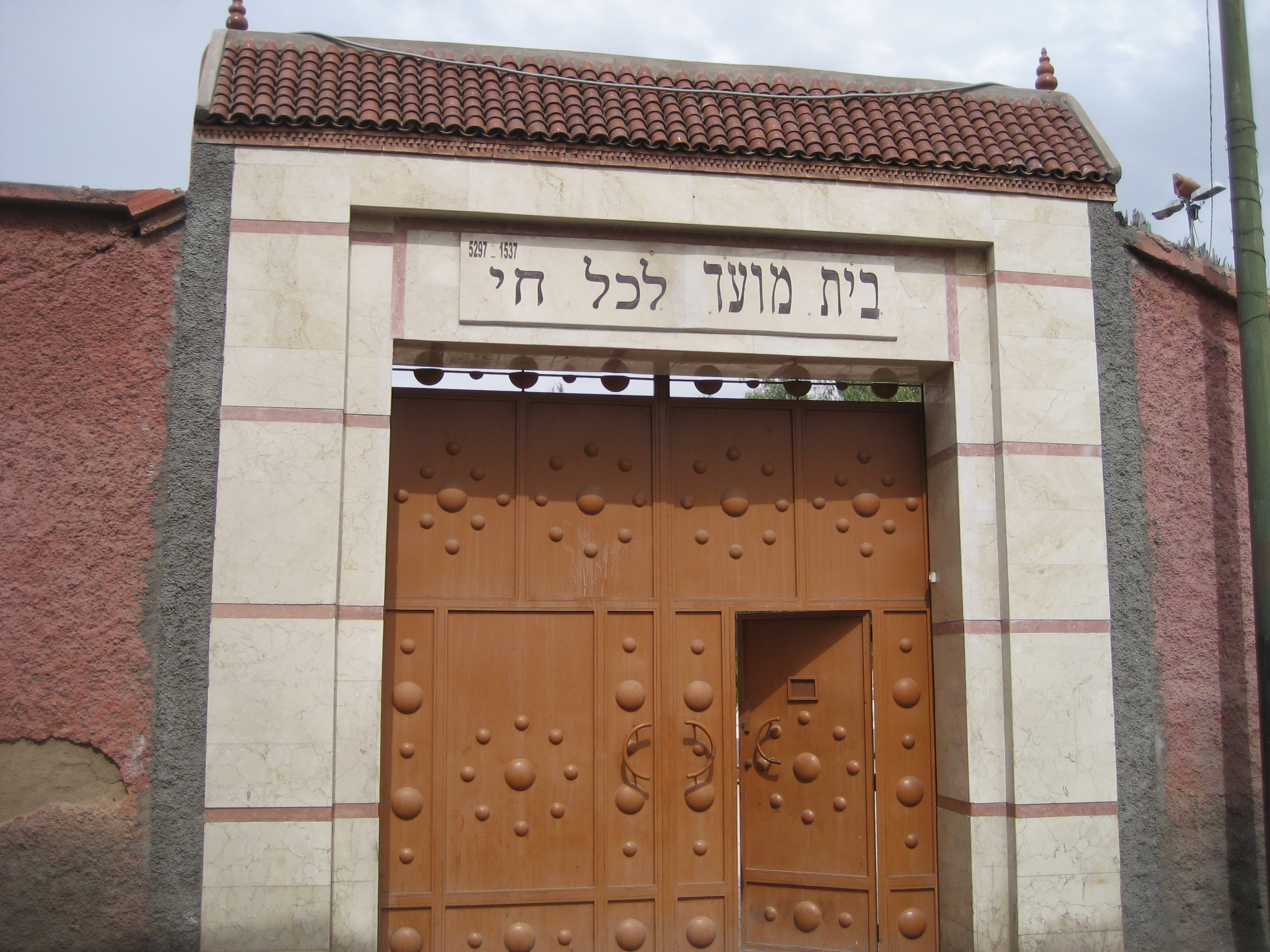
Entrance to the cemetery

The cemetery is one of the largest in the country, covering approximately 2,800 dunams. It is adjacent to the Mellah of Marrakesh. The cemetery has over 20,000 graves. It has separate sections for men, women and children, as per Jewish tradition, a Jew cannot be buried next to a person of the opposite gender that is not their spouse. Its left corner dedicated to around 6,000 children who died during a typhus epidemic in the 19th century. The tombs of the kohanim are painted in blue and located by its entrance. The cemetery has become an attraction for tourists and for Jews from all over the world, including Israelis of Moroccan origin. It is maintained by the Jewish community and by a guard who is there 24 hours a day.

The cemetery has several mausolea, including those of some famous Moroccan rabbis, like Abraham Azoulai and Rabbi David Hazan. Most of the mausolea are located on its perimeter.

== See also ==
- Mellah of Marrakesh
