= Harum =

Harum is a surname. Notable people with the surname include:

- Gisela Harum, Austrian chess master

It is also a historical name for Harome in North Yorkshire, England.

== See also ==
- Harem (disambiguation)
- Harum Scarum, a 1965 musical comedy film starring Elvis Presley and the soundtrack album with the same name by Elvis Presley
- Procol Harum, a British rock band
