= Slat al-Azama Synagogue =

Synagogue in Marrakesh, Morocco

Slat al-Azama Synagogue (Lazama Synagogue)
- Hebrew: בית הכנסת צלאת אל עזמה; Arabic: كنيس صلاة العزامة
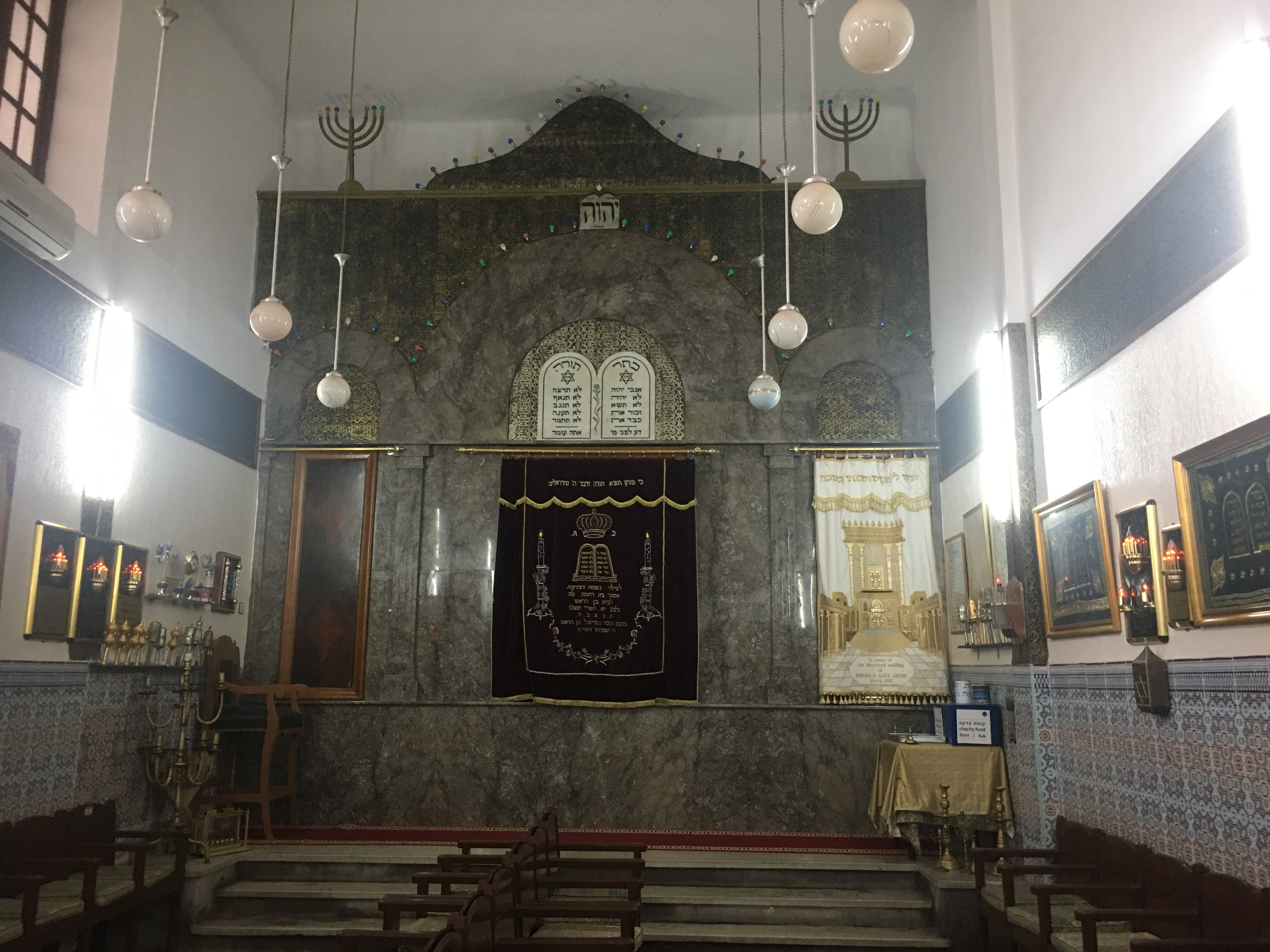
- Interior, view towards the Torah ark

Religion
- Affiliation: Judaism
- Rite: Nusach Sefard
- Ecclesiastical or organizational status: Synagogue
- Status: Active

Location
- Location: Mellah of Marrakesh, Marrakesh-Safi
- Country: Morocco
- Interactive map of Slat al-Azama Synagogue (Lazama Synagogue)
- Coordinates: 31°37′12.4″N 7°58′56.4″W

Architecture
- Established: c. 1492 or later

The Slat al-Azama Synagogue or Lazama Synagogue (Hebrew: בית הכנסת צלאת אל עזמה; Arabic: كنيس صلاة العزامة) is a Jewish congregation and synagogue, located in Marrakesh, Marrakesh-Safi, Morocco. It is located in the historic Mellah (Jewish quarter) of the old city.

== History ==
The synagogue was associated with Sephardic Jews who were expelled from Spain in 1492 (known as the Megorashim). The synagogue's foundation is likewise traditionally attributed to 1492, though one scholar has indicated that the exact year of establishment has not been verified. The Mellah district in which the synagogue is located was not created until 1557. In any case, the synagogue's current form dates from a more modern restoration. The building is still functioning as a synagogue today.

On 8 September 2023, the synagogue and surrounding Jewish quarter were damaged by an earthquake. No casualties were reported.

== Architecture ==
The synagogue is integrated into a larger building which consisted of a private house with a central courtyard (popularly referred to as a riad). This integration of a synagogue into a private home was typical of most synagogues in the Mellah of Marrakesh as well as in the Mellah of Fez. The synagogue itself has traditional Moroccan decoration such as zellij (mosaic tilework).

The east side was renovated after the 1950s, with the addition of a wing for women (ezrat nashim), which is unique in Morocco where tradition dictates that women stay in a separate room at the entrance of the synagogue. The original wooden Torah ark has been replaced by a marble ark, which is located next to the eastern wall. Notes drawn in the 1950s by architect Yaacov Finkerfeld demonstrate that the space mentioned above did not exist for women and that the interior was divided into two naves by four columns. On the upper floor there is a yeshiva.

== See also ==
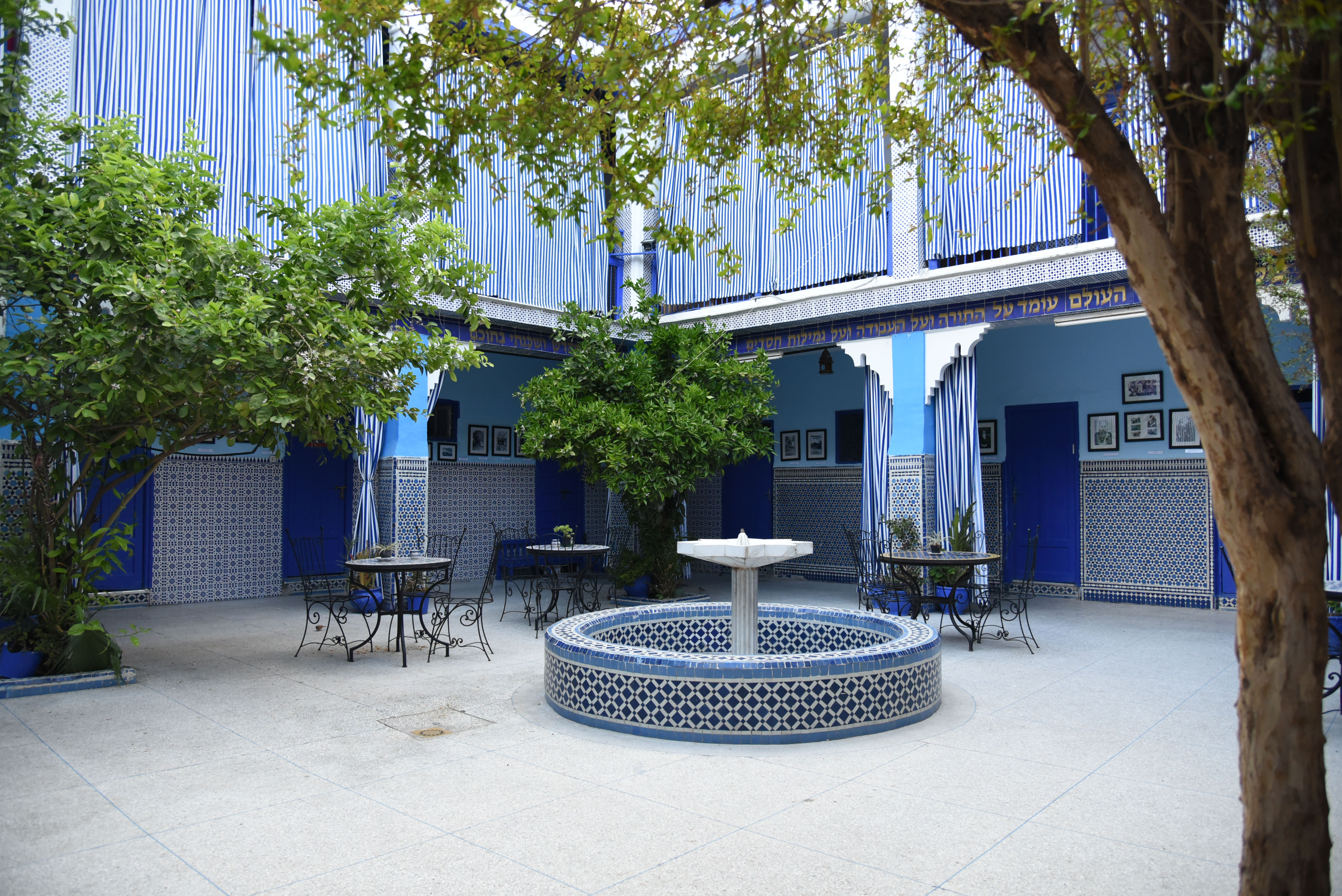
Riad of the synagogue (2016 photo)

- History of the Jews in Morocco
- List of synagogues in Morocco
