= Al-Haram (tribe) =

The Al-Haram (Arabic: الحرم) or Al-Harm are a Bedouin tribe of Saudi Arabia, Sunni Arabs. An Al-Haram myth of origin asserts that they were originally protectors of the Kaaba in the Sacred Mosque or Masjid al-Haram in Mecca.

Jane Hathaway writes that the Haram are presented (but not explicitly stated) in Arab chronicles as a Bedouin tribal group, opposed to the Sa'd faction. The tribe "evidently had a lengthy presence in Yemen", as "pre-Islamic inscriptions in the south Arabian language refer to a H-R-MM". According to Hathaway, the mediaeval Moroccan traveller Ibn Battuta (1304-1377) reports that the 'Banu Haram' people lived in Hali in the north of Yemen. Similarly, Hathaway writes that Yahya b. al-Husayn reports that the Jabal Haram (the mountains of the Haram people) in northern Yemen "submitted to the Zaydi imam in the late thirteenth century".

Sultan bin Muhammad Al-Qasimi writes that in 1760, soldiers "fled to Qishm to seek assistance from Shaikh Rahmah and the Al Haram tribe" on the Persian coast.

== Bibliography ==
- Hathaway, Jane. Myth, Memory, and Identity in Ottoman Egypt and Yemen. SUNY Press, 2003. ISBN 978-0-7914-5884-6 Google Books
- Al-Qasimi, Sultan Bin Muhammad. Power Struggles and Trade in the Gulf: 1620-1820. University of Exeter Press, 1999. Google Books
