= Ḥ-R-M =

Triconsonantal root of many Semitic words

Ḥ-R-M (Modern Hebrew: ח־ר־מ; Arabic: ح–ر–م) is the triconsonantal root of many Semitic words, and many of those words are used as names. The basic meanings expressed by the root can be translated as "forbid,", "exclude," "deny," "prohibit," "set apart," "sanctify," "inviolable," "to declare sacred or unlawful."

== Arabic ==
=== Names ===
- Masjid al-Haram (Arabic: ٱلْـمَـسْـجِـد الْـحَـرَام); "The Sacred Mosque" – the mosque surrounding the Kaaba in Mecca
- Al-Bayṫ al-Ḥarām (Arabic: ٱلْـبَـيْـت الْـحَـرَام, "The Sacred House"); the Kaaba
- Muḥarram (Arabic: مُـحَـرَّم, "The Sanctified [Month]"); the first month of the Islamic calendar
- Al-Ḥaram ash-Sharîf (Arabic: ٱلْـحَـرَم الـشَّـرِيْـف, "The Noble Sanctuary"); the Temple Mount in Jerusalem

=== Concepts ===
- Maḥram (Arabic: مَـحْـرَم, "forbidden", "unmarriageable (kinsman)", also "no need to cover" (see also types of hijab), or an unforbidden person within the family)
- Iḥrâm (Arabic: إِحْـرَام); Hajj cloth, and the state of ritual consecration
- Harem (Arabic: حَـرِيْـم, "forbidden precinct"); private area of a house, in contrast to the areas meant for receiving guests; a place set apart for the household's women, and off-limits to non-Mahram men.
- Ḥarām (Arabic: حَـرَام); ritually impure, or a forbidden thing
- Ḥaram (Arabic: حَـرَم); sanctuary

== Hebrew and Aramaic concepts ==
- Ḥerem or Cherem (Hebrew: חרם, pl. Ḥāremōṫ (Hebrew: חָרְמוֹת) or Ḥarāmôṫ (Hebrew: חֲרָמוֹת)); a term with several applications
- Haḥrāmah (Hebrew: הַחְרָמָה); Confiscation (civil law)

== See also ==
- Holiest sites in Islam
- List of characters and names mentioned in the Quran
- Middle East
