= Haram (site) =

Islamic holy place (lit. "sanctuary")

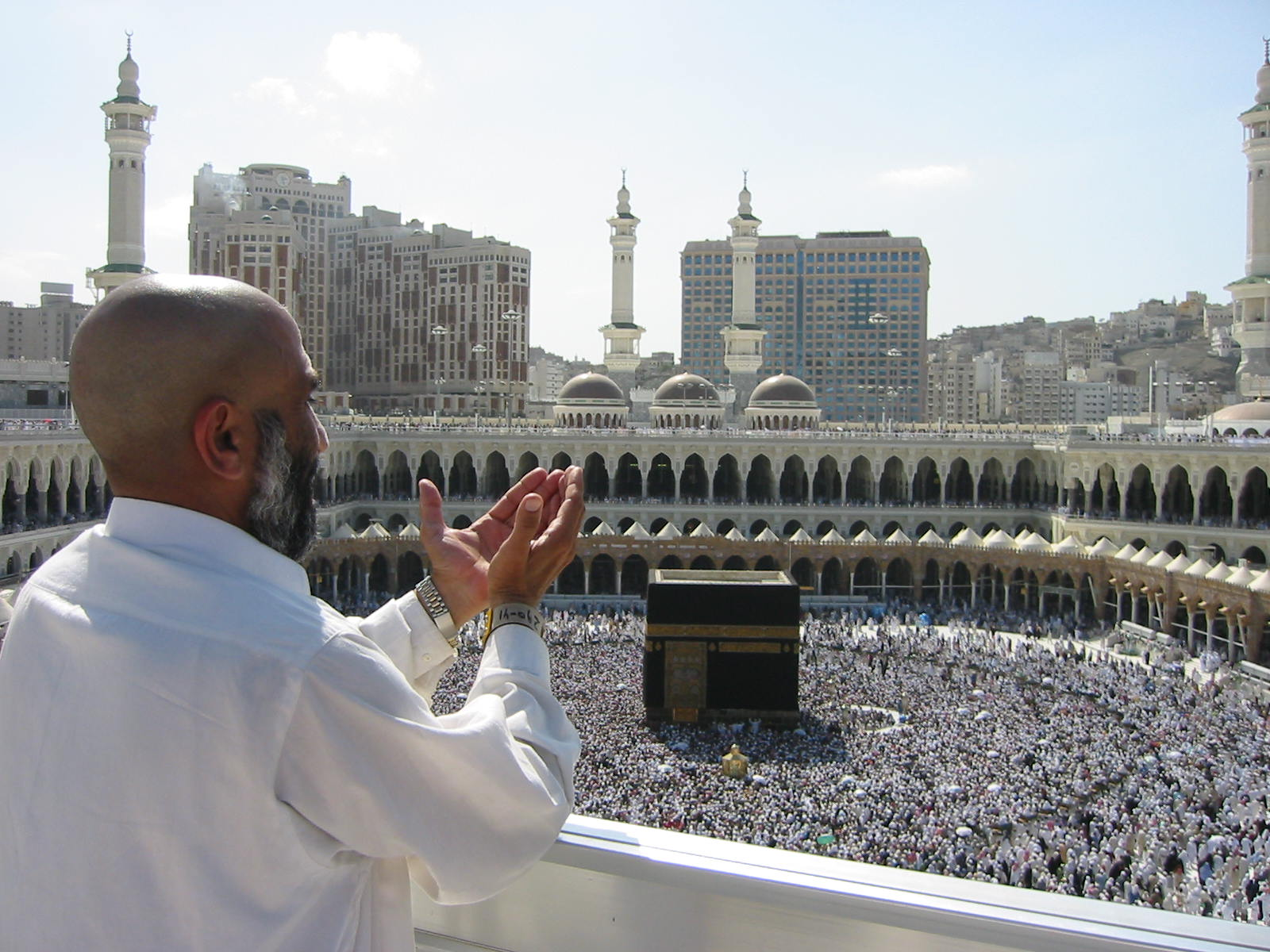
A pilgrim supplicating at Al-Masjid Al-Ḥarām (ٱلْمَسْجِد ٱلْحَرَام) in Mecca, Hejazi region of Saudi Arabia

Haram (Arabic: حَرَم, romanized: ḥaram, lit. 'sanctuary') is one of several similar words originating from the triliteral Semitic root Ḥ-R-M. The word literally means "sanctuary", commonly used by Muslims to refer to Al-Masjid Al-Haram and Prophet Mohammad's Mosque. There are certain rules which Muslims within these two areas must follow.

Another meaning of the word which was used in the past but has since fallen out of use, include an "inviolable/protected zone", referring to an area in which the number of residing families was limited, attributed to the idea of carrying capacity and early forms of nature reserves, and to the prayer hall of the mosque.

== Etymology ==
The Arabic language has two separate words, ḥaram (حَرَم) and ḥarām (حَرَام) both derived from the same triliteral Semitic root Ḥ-R-M. Both of these words can mean "forbidden" and/or "sacred" in a general way, but each has also developed some specialized meanings (ḥarām most often means "forbidden by law"). A third related word derived from the same root, that is ḥarīm (حَرِيْم), most directly corresponds to English "harem". This article covers the word ḥaram (with short vowels in the singular form).

== In Islam ==
=== Protected zone ===
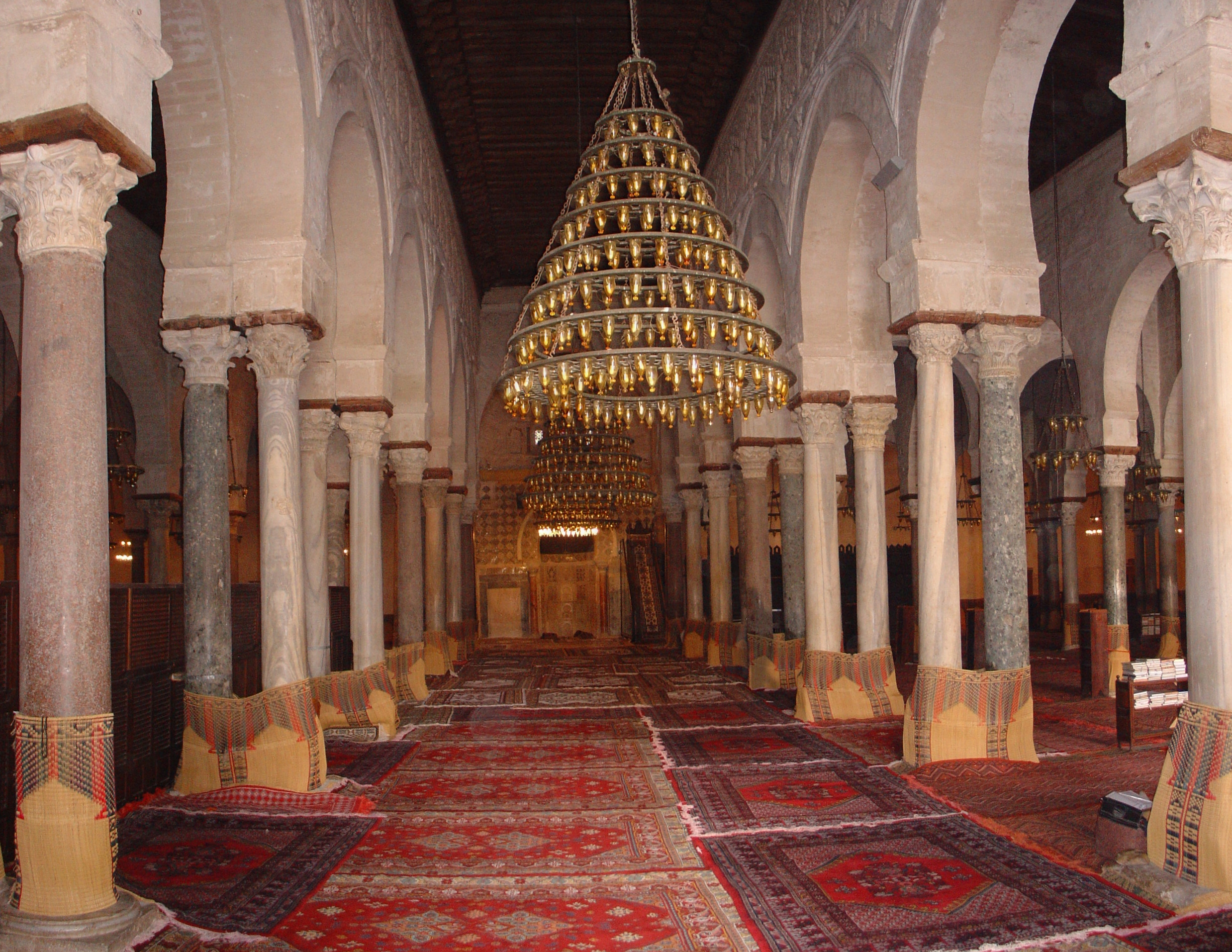
Haram or prayer hall of the Great Mosque of Kairouan (also called the Mosque of Uqba) which is located in the historic city of Kairouan in Tunisia, North Africa

As used in Islamic urban planning, the word ḥaram means "inviolate zone", an important aspect of urban planning in Muslim civilization. Such protected areas were sanctuaries, or places where contending parties could settle disputes peacefully. Towns were usually built near a river which provided drinking and domestic water (upstream) and carried away waste and sewage (downstream). Muslims claim to have introduced the idea of carrying capacity, and clearly sometimes did limit the number of families in any given town. The harams were typically positioned to ensure access to parkland and nature (which were given another name, hima), to restrict urban sprawl, protect water-courses and watersheds and oases. In this respect the rules strongly resembled modern zoning laws, with the same purposes.

The distinction between haram and hima is thought by some modern scholars to have been necessary due to a different means of deciding which regions were to have restrictions - the selection of haram was considered to be more up to the community while the selection of hima had more to do with natural characteristics of the region, which were considered to be best respected by jurists. This idea probably arises from two different obligations of the Muslim to respect the ijmaʿ (consensus of neighbors within Islam) and practice Khilafah (Stewardship of nature under Allah). It may or may not reflect actual means of decision making historically. As a protected and inviolate zone, haram is also employed referring to the consecrated space in a mosque where rituals and prayer take place: it is the prayer hall.

=== Holy site ===
Ḥaram can also mean a site of high sanctity. The two sites whose Islamic sanctity are unchallengeably the highest of all are Al-Masjid al-Haram in Mecca (which is called Ḥaraman Āminan (حَرَمًا آمِنًا, "Sanctuary (which is) Secure") in the Quran (28:57; 29:67), and the Prophet's Mosque in Medina, so the Arabic dual form al-ḥaramān (ٱلْحَرَمَان) or al-ḥaramayn (ٱلْحَرَمَيْن) refers to these two places, both of which are in the Hejazi region of the Arabian Peninsula. Since 1986, the Saudi monarchy has disclaimed all royal titles except "Custodian of the Two Holy Sanctuaries" or "Custodian of the Two Holy Mosques" (خَادِم ٱلْحَرَمَيْن ٱلشَّرِيْفَيْن, Khādim al-Ḥaramayn ash-Sharīfayn).

In addition, the term ḥaram is commonly used to refer to certain other holy sites, such as the Masjid Al-Aqsa (ٱلْحَرَم ٱلشَّرِيْف, Al-Ḥaram Ash-Sharīf) in Jerusalem — though over the protests of some, such as Ibn Taymiyyah, who declared that the only places which could be legitimately called "ḥaram" were Mecca, Medina, and probably also the valley of Wajj in Taif, thus rejecting other places like Hebron and even Jerusalem. In fact, one of the Islamic names of Jerusalem, thālith al-ḥaramayn (ثَالِث ٱلْحَرَمَيْن, literally "the third of the two holy places") resolves the tension between the unchallengeable pre-eminence of Mecca and Medina versus the desire to recognize Jerusalem as having a special status in Islam in a somewhat paradoxical manner. Jerusalem, being home to Masjid Al-Aqsa (one of the few mosques that are mentioned by name in the Quran, and consequently one of the most important mosques) is normally seen as being holy in its own right.

== See also ==
- Abraham's relationship with harams
- Taboo, from tapu in Polynesian culture, also means both "sacred" and "forbidden"
