= Harem (disambiguation) =

Harem refers to domestic spaces that are reserved for the women of the house in a Muslim family.

Harem may also refer to:

- Harem (zoology), an animal group consisting of one or two males, a number of females, and their offspring

== Arts and entertainment ==
- Harem (genre), a subgenre of Japanese light novels, manga, anime and video games

=== Film and television ===
- Harem (film), a 1985 French romantic drama film
- Harem (TV series), a 2001 Norwegian reality TV series
- Harem, a 1986 TV miniseries starring Omar Sharif
- Her Harem (Italian: L'harem, released in UK as The Harem), a 1967 Italian comedy-drama film

=== Literature ===
- Harem (novel), an 1874 Armenian language novel by Raffi
- Harem (Alliata book), a 1980 book by Vittoria Alliata
- Harem, a 2003 novel by Barbara Nadel, 2003
- Harem, a 1993 novel by Colin Falconer
- Harem, a 1986 novel by Diane Carey

=== Music ===
- Harem (album), by Sarah Brightman, 2003
  - "Harem" (song)
- "The Harem", a single by Acker Bilk, 1963

== Places ==
- Harem, Iran
- Harem, Syria
  - Harem District
- Harem, Üsküdar, Istanbul, Turkey
- Ottoman Imperial Harem, Topkapi Palace, Istanbul

== See also ==
- Harum, a surname
- Harem pants or harem trousers, baggy, long pants caught in at the ankle
- Haremlik, the private portion of upper-class Ottoman homes
- Polygyny, a form of marriage in which a man has two or more wives at the same time
- Imperial Chinese harem system
