= Wadi al-Fara =

Wadi al-Fara وادي الفرع Wadi al-Far'
- Governorate
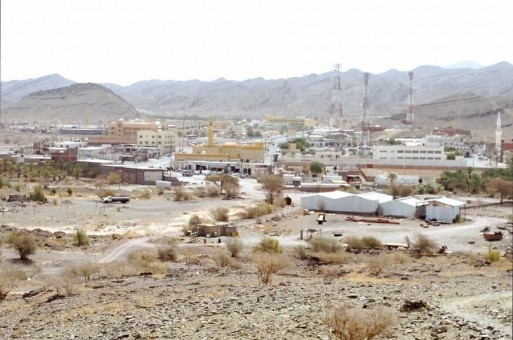
- Wadi al-Fara

- Location of Wadi al-Fara in Medina Province
- Coordinates: 23.5°N 39.5°E
- Country: Saudi Arabia
- Province: Medina
- Established: 30 December 2013

Area
  - Total: 8,099 km^{2} (3,127 sq mi)

Population (2022 Census)
  - Total: 23,120
  - Density: 2.855/km^{2} (7.394/sq mi)
- Time zone: UTC+3 (SAST)

Wadi al-Fara or Wadi al-Far' (Arabic: وادي الفرع) is a governorate in the province of Medina in Saudi Arabia. It covers an area of 8,099 kilometres (5,032 mi) and recorded a population of 23,120 in the 2022 Saudi census.

== Geography ==
Wadi al-Fara is located in the Harrat Rahat volcanic field in the Hijaz Mountains south of the city of Medina. It borders the governorates of Badr to the northwest, Medina to the north, and Mahd adh Dhahab to the east, all of these also being part of the province of Medina. Wadi al-Fara also borders two governorates in the province of Mecca, Khulays to the southeast and Rabigh to the southwest. The highest point in the governorate is Jabal Idqis at an elevation of 2,156 metres (7,073 ft).

The governorate of Wadi al-Fara is located in the watersheds of Wadi Masturah, Wadi Rabigh, and Wadi al-Aqiq, a tributary of Wadi al-Hamd. Of the numerous springs that historically flowed in Wadi al-Fara, three remain active today at Abu Daba', al-Madiq, and Umm al-Ayal.

Frederick Fraser Hunter's 1908 Map of Arabia and the Persian Gulf mistakenly connected the northern end of Wadi al-Fara to Wadi as-Safra, which flows southwest past Badr into the Red Sea. The 1917 Gazetteer of Arabia reflected this error in its description of the course of Wadi al-Fara, which includes that of Wadi as-Safra. The Wadi al-Fara south of Medina should also not be confused with the Wadi Far' or Wadi Fara'a located west of Medina, also known as Wadi Yanbu An-Nakhl, which drains into the Red Sea near Yanbu. The Gazetteer of Arabia reported that the upper reaches of Wadi Jizal, a tributary of Wadi al-Hamd, has also been called Wadi al-Fara.

Under the Köppen climate classification, Wadi al-Fara experiences a hot desert climate. Annual rainfall in the area is about 75 to 85 millimetres (3.0 to 3.3 in).

== History ==
In the works of Yaqut al-Hamawi, Al-Bakri, and Nur al-Din al-Samhudi, Wadi al-Fara is recorded as a prosperous date-producing oasis. The place was previously known as al-Fara without the "Wadi".

Charles M. Doughty recorded in Travels in Arabia Deserta that Wadi al-Fara, which lay on the middle route between Medina and Mecca, had once belonged to the Awazim, but was at the time inhabited by the Banu Amr, Banu Salim, and al-Ubbeda groups of the Harb tribe. The Banu Amr still inhabit the region today.

Wadi al-Fara was separated from the governorate of Medina and inaugurated as a category B governorate on 30 December 2013.

== Demographics ==
Wadi al-Fara recorded a population of 23,120 in the 2022 Saudi census. According to the census, Wadi al-Fara's population had a sex ratio of 109 males per 100 females compared to the province-wide sex ratio of 149 males per 100 females, and 90.4% of the population were Saudi citizens, compared to 63.4% for the province of Medina as a whole. The average household size in Wadi al-Fara was 4.2 and the total fertility rate was 3.6.

The 2022 census recorded two settlements having a population greater than 2500, al-Yutmah (population 3561), and al-Faqir (population 3349).

Wadi al-Fara contains a population of indigenous Twelver Shiites known generally as the Nakhawila, although locally they are called the Jahami. In 1996, the Nakhawila population of Wadi al-Fara was estimated at 8000.

== Economy and infrastructure ==
Date palm, henna, and various vegetables are grown in the area, mostly through the use of groundwater irrigation.

Highway 15 and the Haramain High Speed Railway, both of which connect Medina and Mecca, run north to south through Wadi al-Fara.
