= Al madiq =

Al madiq may refer to:

- Al madiq, Al Madinah, Saudi Arabia
- Al madiq, Makkah, Saudi Arabia
- Qalaat al-Madiq, a medieval castle and modern town in Syria
