= Diba =

Diba may refer to:

== Textiles ==
- Diba, a fabric, damascened silk brocade
- Diba, a pointed hat of the Kabiri of New Guinea

== Places ==
- Diba, a neighborhood in Plumtree, Zimbabwe
- Abu Dhiba, a village in western Saudi Arabia
- Ra's Diba, a cape in United Arab Emirates
- Diba, village in Kongo Central, Democratic Republic of the Congo

== People ==
- Diba (surname)
- Diba Chandra Hrangkhawl (born 1956), politician from Tripura, India
- Diba Nwegbo (born 2002), Nigerian-American footballer

== See also ==
- Dibba
