= Shia Muslims in the Arab world =

Islam is divided into two main branches, Sunni and Shia Islam, each with its own sub-sects. Large numbers of Shia Arab Muslims live in some Arab countries including Iraq, Yemen, Bahrain, Lebanon, Saudi Arabia, Kuwait, Oman, the UAE, and Qatar.

Shia Muslims are a numerical majority in Iraq. Approximately 35% of the population in Yemen and nearly half of the Muslims in Bahrain and Lebanon are Shia Muslims. There is also a very large population of Shia Muslims living in the Persian Gulf countries especially in Saudi Arabia. An estimated 5–10% of citizens in Saudi Arabia are Shia Muslims, most of whom are adherents to Twelver Shia Islam. Twelvers are predominantly represented by the Baharna community living in the Eastern Province, with the largest concentrations in Qatif, and half the population in al-Hasa. In addition there is a small Twelver Shia minority in Medina (called the Nakhawila). Sizable Zaydi and Isma'ili communities also live in Najran along the border with Yemen. Saudi Arabia officially follows Wahhabism, a strict, recently established sect of Sunni Islam. There is little freedom of religion between the different sects even whilst all of the population are Muslims. Smaller Shia groups are present in Egypt and Jordan.

Despite the heavy presence of Shia Muslims in some Arab countries, particularly among the population of the Persian Gulf Arab countries, they have been treated poorly throughout history. For both historical and political reasons, Shi'a Arabs have fared relative poorly in much of the Arab world, and the topic of Shi‘ism and Shia groups is one of the most sensitive issues for the Sunni elite.

== Yemen ==
Arab Shiites in Yemen have been traditionally suppressed, often violently. Massacres have taken place by government forces using tanks and airplanes to obliterate the uprising of Shī‘a groups in the country. Shias make up about 35% of citizens of Yemen.

== Saudi Arabia ==
Saudi Shias are largely concentrated in Eastern Province and are Baharna. They make up the majority in al-Qatif and half of the population of Al-Ahsa. There is also a small Twelver Shia minority in Medina (called the Nakhawila). Sizable Isma'ili communities also live in Najran along the border with Yemen. An estimated 5–10% of citizens in Saudi Arabia are Shia Muslims.

In the Kingdom of Saudi Arabia, the treatment of its Shia population has been a subject of scrutiny, with claims of a perceived status as second-class citizens. Restrictions on the construction of Shia mosques beyond the eastern province and the prohibition of Husainyas have been reported. Furthermore, the Saudi government has been accused of engaging in a propaganda campaign against Shia Muslims, employing derogatory terms such as "idolaters" and "mushriks."

Notably, the Saudi government has implemented a ban on marriage between Shias and Sunnis, fostering additional tensions between the two communities. The issue extends beyond domestic matters, as the transnational affiliations of Shiites with religious authorities in other nations have been used as a basis for accusations of disloyalty and even treason against Saudi Shiites.

Additionally, the absence of religious seminaries in Saudi Arabia contributes to the challenges faced by the Shia community in pursuing their religious education. These multifaceted issues reflect the complexities surrounding the status and treatment of Shia Muslims within the Kingdom, warranting attention and analysis.

== Iraq ==
Iraqi Shias are predominantly situated in the southern part of Iraq.

Saddam Hussein and his 15 former aides, including Ali Hassan al-Majid (known as Chemical Ali), were held responsible for their role in the suppression of a Shia uprising and the deaths of 60,000 to 100,000 people. The trial of Chemical Ali took place in Baghdad in August 2007.

Unlike other sects of Islam, the Shias of Iraq have been treated horrifically under the regime of Saddam Hussein, when many Iraqi Shī‘as of Persian descent were expelled from the country in the 1980s, despite being the majority of the country at 60%. Reports indicated that no neighborhood was left intact after the 1991 uprising in Karbala. In the vicinity of the shrines of Husayn ibn Ali and Abbas ibn Ali, most of the buildings surrounding the shrines were completely reduced to rubble. The shrines themselves were scarred from bullet marks and tank fire.

In December 2005, workers maintaining water pipes 500 meters from the Imam Hussein Shrine unearthed a mass grave containing dozens of bodies, apparently those of Shiites killed after the uprising.

== Egypt ==
According to Brian Whitaker, in Egypt, the small Shia population is harassed by the authorities and treated with suspicion, being arrested - ostensibly for security reasons - and subjected to abuse by state security officers for their religious beliefs. Estimated numbers of Egypt’s Shias range from two to three million.

== Lebanon ==
The most recent demographic study conducted by Statistics Lebanon, a Beirut-based research firm, found that 28% of Lebanon's population is Shia Muslim. The Shia are the only sect that has ever had the post of Speaker of Parliament. The Shia Muslims are largely concentrated in northern and western Beqaa, Southern Lebanon and in the southern suburbs of Beirut.

== United Arab Emirates ==
10% of Emirati citizens belong to the Shia sect. In addition, Shia Islam is also practiced among the country's large Iranian community and other Muslim expatriate groups.

== Qatar ==
Shiites comprise around 10% of Qatar's Muslim population.

== Kuwait ==
30–40% of Kuwaiti citizens are Shia Muslims.

== Bahrain ==
Shias make up around 40% of Bahraini Muslim population. The majority and ruling absolute monarchy is Sunni. Shias in Bahrain were previously the majority, having met oppression for many years. During the 2011 Uprisings, a collaborative effort between Shia and Sunni communities sought to bring about the overthrow of the monarchy. Regrettably, during this period, there were instances of misrepresentation and misinformation propagated by the monarchy, falsely implicating Shias in collaborating with the Islamic Republic of Iran. This narrative further exacerbated tensions between the two groups, fanning the flames of sectarianism within Bahrain.

The aftermath of the uprisings has left a lasting impact on the Shia community, with persistent instances of discrimination against Shia Muslims. The Bahraini authorities have been reported to engage in the harassment and physical attacks targeting Shia clerics, thereby curtailing their religious and social influence. Moreover, Shia individuals encounter difficulties in securing desirable employment opportunities, particularly within government positions. Additionally, there have been documented instances of the Bahraini government impeding the mourning rituals conducted by the Shia community to honor figures such as Imam Hussain and other revered imams. Reports indicate that these actions have included efforts to hinder and disrupt these commemorative events. Furthermore, the government has been alleged to engage in the removal of black flags that Shias traditionally raise in proximity to their mosques and residential areas, which hold symbolic significance within the community's religious practices.

== See also ==
- Shia–Sunni relations
