= Jabal Daka =

Mountain in Saudi Arabia

Coordinates: 21°06′N 40°17′E

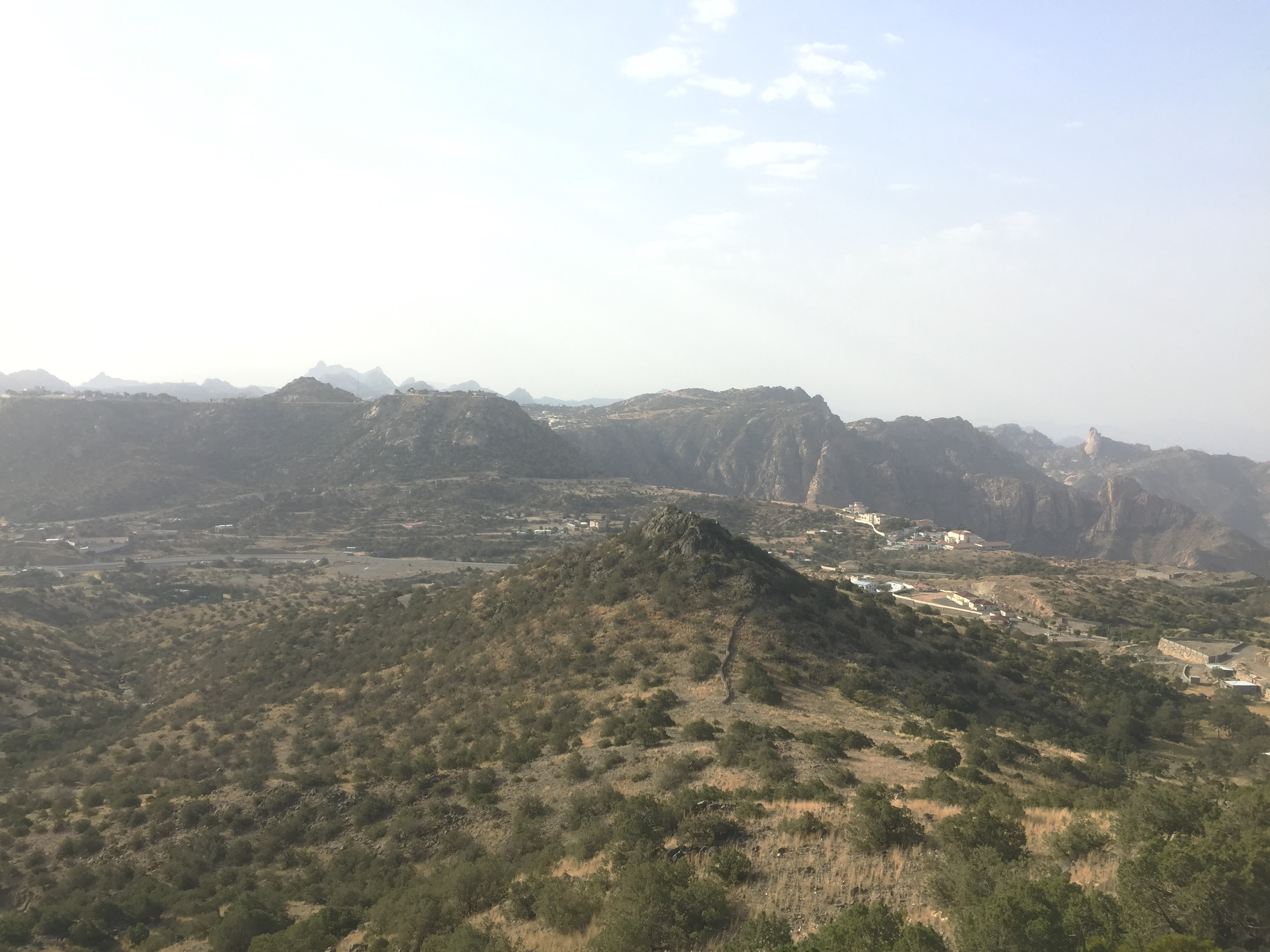
- Jabal Dakka, Al-Shafa, Hejaz

Highest point
- Elevation: 2,500–2,900 m (8,200–9,500 ft)

Naming
- Native name: جَبَل دَكَّا (Arabic); Jabal Dakkā (Arabic)

Geography
- Location within Saudi Arabia Location within Middle East Location within Asia
- Location: Makkah Region, Saudi Arabia

Jabal Dakkā (Arabic: جَبَل دَكَّا), or Mount Daka, is the highest mountain in the area of the town of Ash-Shafā, about 20 km (12 miles) from the city of Taif, located in the western region of Saudi Arabia.

== Height ==
The height of the top of the mountain is between 2,500 and 2,900 metres (8,200 and 9,500 feet) above sea level, this has caused a controversy with the timing of the sunset for Ramadan, as the sun stays on the peak two minutes longer than the surrounding area. To resolve the controversy a panel of religious scholars visited the mountain to observe sunset. The committee of legitimacy, including a member of the Supreme Council of Saudi Scholars Abdullah al-Mutlaq determined that the peak need not adhere to calendar.

== Location ==
The mountain is located 20 kilometres (12 miles) south-west of Taif. It overlooks the Shifa tourist center. The mountain is used to know the dates of prayer, fasting and breakfast in the month of Ramadan. The vegetation of the mountain is covered with juniper trees, the plant covers the bottom of the mountain and then gradually thins out until it reaches the top. The temperature of the top reaches below 0 °C (32 °F) in the winter. The mountain has a tourist resort just 7 km (4.3 miles) away from the Shifa.

== Wildlife ==
Hamadryas baboons are present here.

== See also ==
- List of mountains in Saudi Arabia
