= Mushrif =

Settlement in Saudi Arabia

Mushrif مُشْرِف
- Village
- Location in Saudi Arabia Mushrif (Middle East) Mushrif (West and Central Asia)
- Coordinates: 22°37′45″N 41°21′24″E
- Country: Saudi Arabia
- Province: Makkah
- Time zone: UTC+3 (EAT)
  - Summer (DST): UTC+3 (EAT)

Mushrif (Arabic: مُشْرِف) is a village in Mecca Province, in western Saudi Arabia.

== See also ==
- Arabian Peninsula
  - Regions of Saudi Arabia
  - Hijaz Mountains
