= Ibrahim Mountain =

Mountain in Taif, Saudi Arabia

Coordinates: 20°25′54″N 41°08′28″E

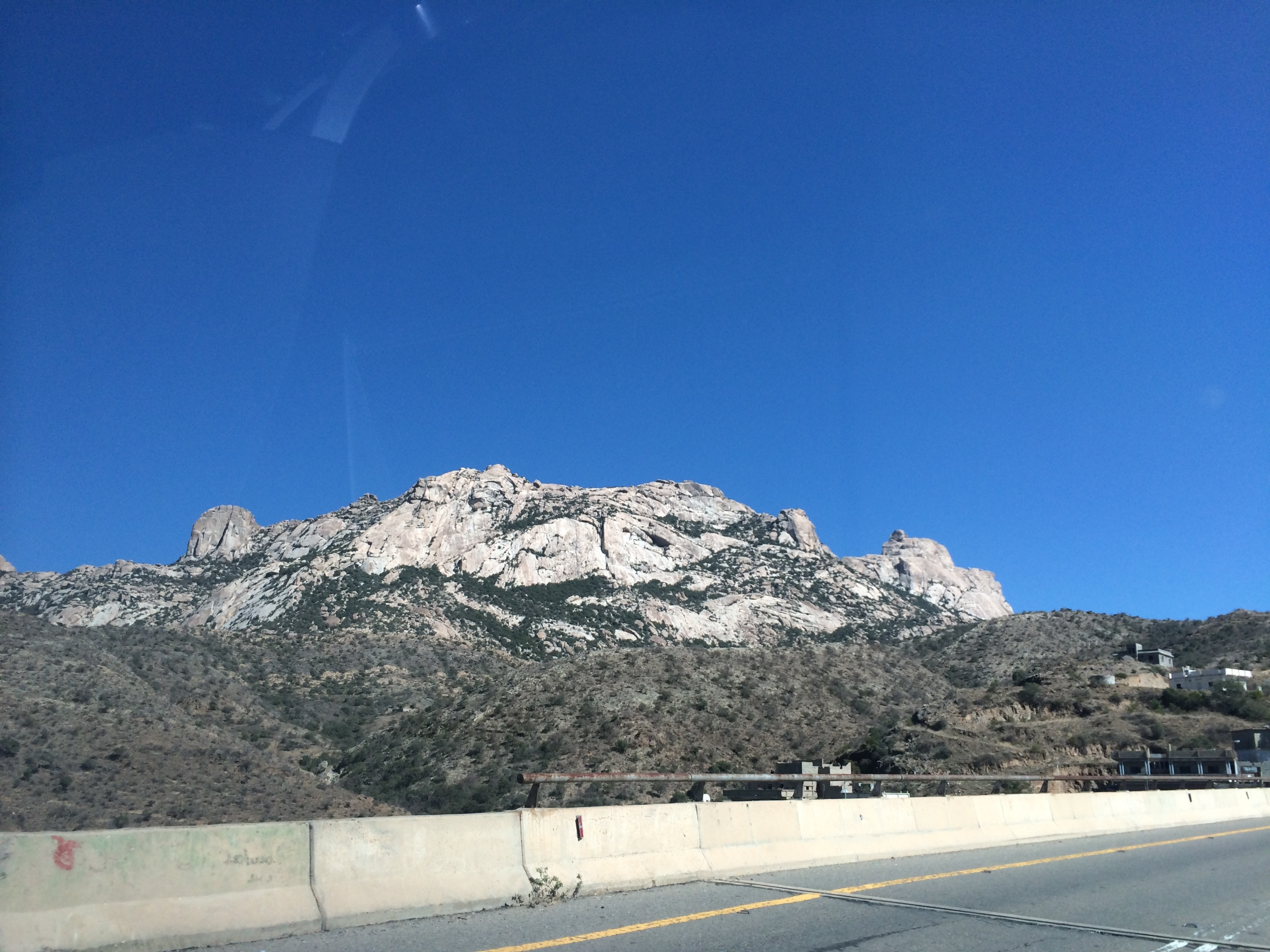

Highest point
- Elevation: 1,524 meters (5,000 ft)

Geography
- Location: Saudi Arabia Bani Malik
- Parent range: Sarawat Mountains

Ibrahim Mountain, also called Bithra Mountain and the White Mountain (because it consists of white rocks) is a mountain in the Kingdom of Saudi Arabia in the Hejaz mountain range in the southwest on the King Fahd Tourist Road, near the center of Al-Qurayyah Bani Malik (south of Taif). It is the highest peak above sea level in the region and is a tourist destination in Taif Governorate. It is around 5,000 feet high.

== Name ==
Ibn al-Mujawar said that the mountain was named after Al-Khalil Ibrahim. Ibn Shihab al-Zuhri said that the Hanafis believed it was a holy place where Ibrahim (Abraham) was born.

It is 1524 meters high, the 30th highest Saudi mountain, located in the center of Al-Qurayyah Bani Malik.

== Description ==
This mountain is the highest peak above sea level for this area, with a height of about (5,000) feet above sea level. It is also one of the most important landmarks in Taif Governorate, which is visited by visitors, researchers, and nature lovers, and is surrounded by many villages that are inhabited by a number of citizens until now, despite the rugged and difficult terrain, it is also home to the Arabian leopard and is one of the places protected by the National Authority for the Protection and Development of Wildlife, as well as ancient stone archaeological villages at its summit.

The mountain witnesses a large number of visitors in the summer every year to enjoy the beautiful scenery, greenery, and waterfalls, where the cool air is refreshing due to its high altitude above sea level, the mountain is covered with a beautiful green cover of juniper trees, wild olives and other species. Among the attractions that attract tourists to this mountain are the archaeological villages that are located on the top of the mountain as if suspended in the air and the carvings on the rock faces, there are also a number of people living in several villages in it, called Bithra villages, which are located at the foot of the mountain's high altitude, and fog is always crowded on the top of this mountain due to its high altitude.

Ibrahim Mountain is an important tourist attraction and was mentioned by Yaqut al-Hamawi in his dictionary. Hikers visit this mountain to climb it from the eastern side of it, and this may take a whole day due to the height of the mountain. At the top of the mountain there are ancient villages, waterfalls, and animals such as baboons. Astonishingly, there is a great rock at the top of the mountain that makes a sound like the gurgling of water, and there are waterfalls and various dense trees at the top of the mountain.

== See also ==
- List of mountains in Saudi Arabia
