= Al-Kateb House =

Bait Al-Kateb
- بيت الكاتب
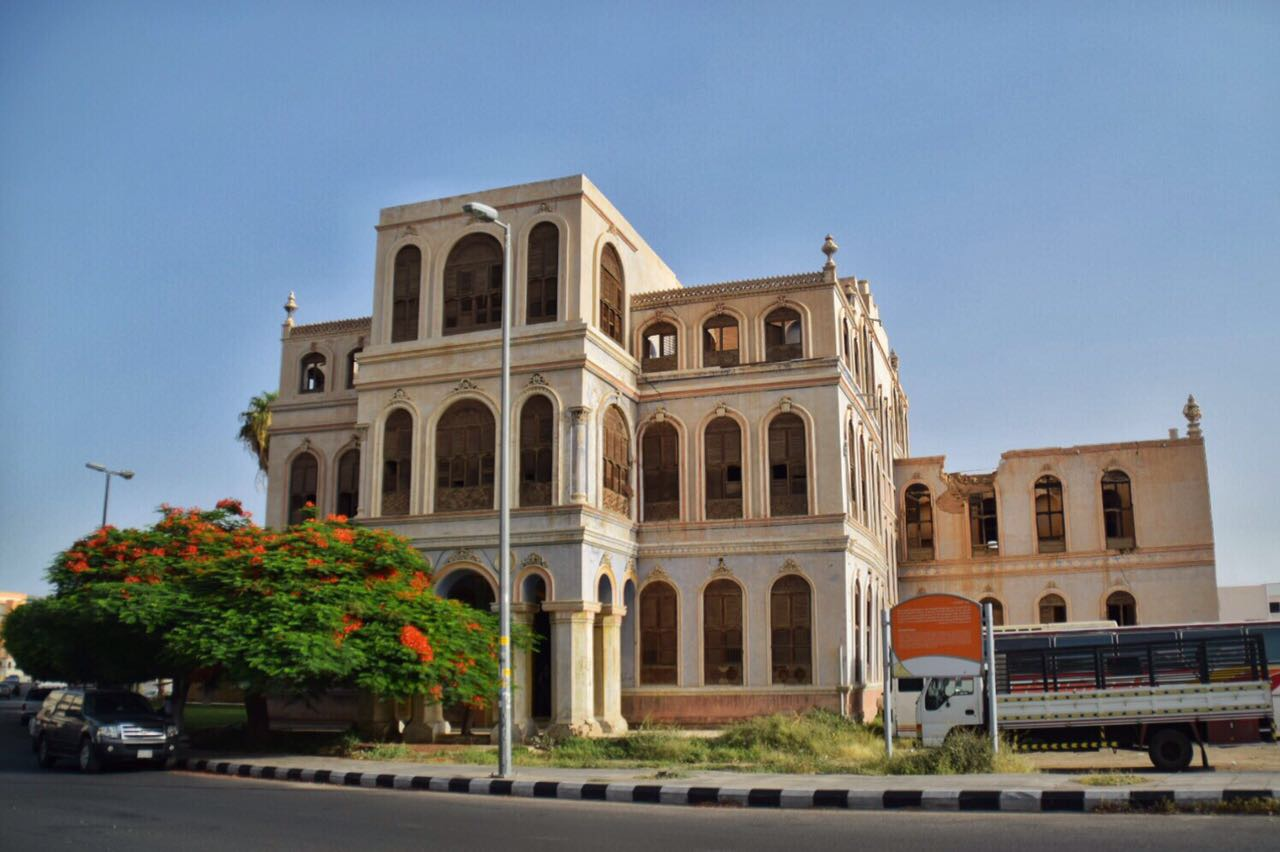

General information
- Location: Al-Salam District, Taif, Saudi Arabia
- Construction started: 1897-1898

Height
- Architectural: Islam, Roman

Al-Kateb House (Arabic: بيت الكاتب) is located in Taif, Saudi Arabia. It includes a number of Islamic decorations and Roman pillars. It was built in 1897–1898 by Mohamed bin Abdul Wahed, special clerk (kateb) of Awn ar-Rafiq. King Faisal, when serving as a viceroy in Hijaz lived at this palace, named at that time Kasr Al Nyaba. Prince Bandar bin Mohamed bin Abdulaziz Al Saud has also been in that palace. The palace has been abandoned since 1968–1969.
