= Mohammed Alzeer =

Saudi Arabian businessman

- Born: Taif
- Other names: Abu Hamad
- Occupation: Businessman

Mohammed Alzeer (Arabic: محمد الزير) is a Saudi Arabian businessman who is the majority shareholder in MAZ Aviation, a subsidiary of which is one of the shareholders for GDC Technics.

== MAZ Aviation ==
Alzeer's MAZ Aviation acquired Gore Design Completions in 2013. The firm specializes in customizing passenger and executive jets for the use of heads of state and similar clients. Alzeer is Gore's general partner. In 2015, GDC Technics leased 840,000 sq. ft. of space at Alliance Airport in Fort Worth, Texas. In 2016 it was revealed that GDC Technics was a Boeing subcontractor that serviced parts of Air Force One, the first time that the U.S. government had admitted foreign involvement in the maintenance of the plane.
