= Taif =

City in Makkah Province, Saudi Arabia

Taif Aṭ-Ṭāʾif (ٱلطَّائِف)
- City
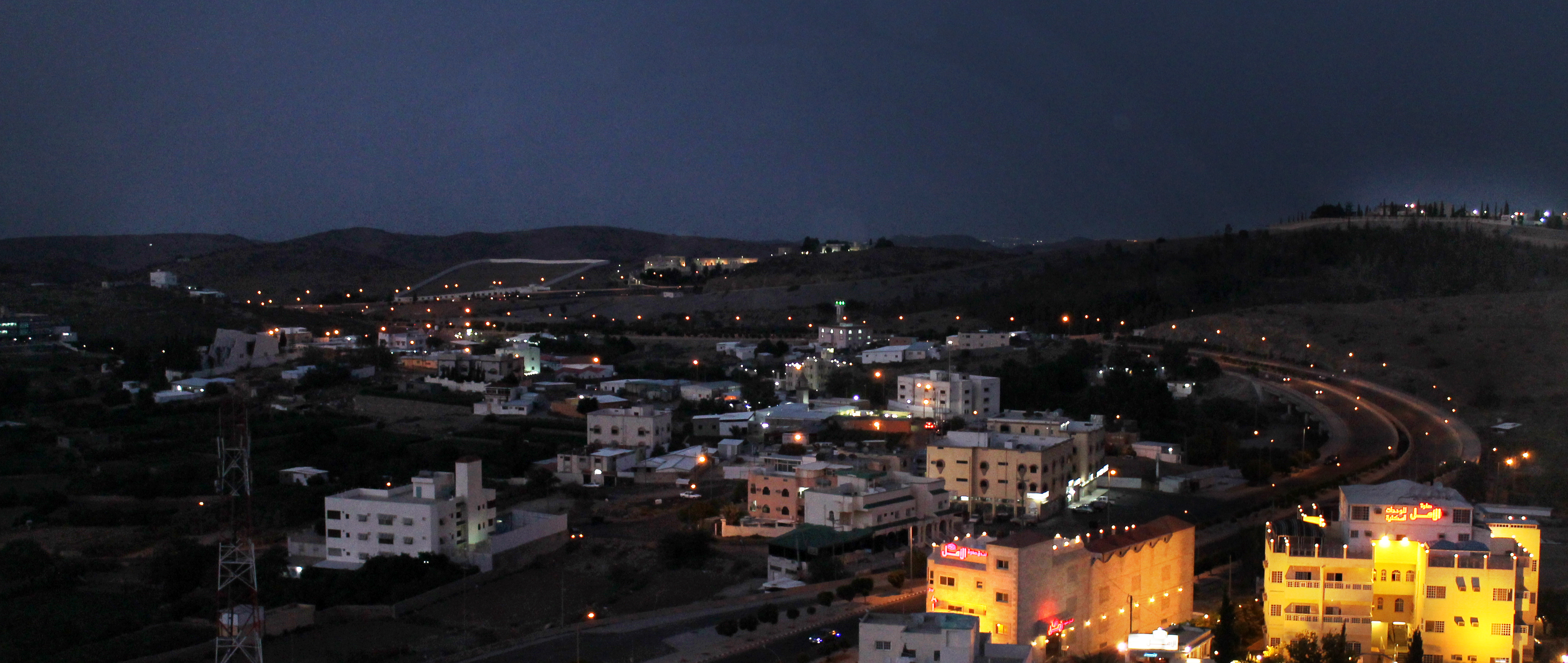
- Taif, as seen from Al Hada
- Nicknames: Madīnat al-Wurūd (Arabic: مَدِيْنَة ٱلْوُرُوْد, lit. 'City of the Roses'); Summer capital of the Kingdom
- Location in the Kingdom of Saudi Arabia Taif (Middle East) Taif (West and Central Asia)
- Coordinates: 21°16′30.34″N 40°24′22.16″E
- Country: Saudi Arabia
- Province: Mecca
- Governorate: Taif

Area
  - City: 321 km^{2} (124 sq mi)
- Elevation: 1,879 m (6,165 ft)

Population (2022 census)
  - City: 563,282
  - Rank: 6
  - Density: 2,144/km^{2} (5,554/sq mi)
  - Urban: 751,634
  - Metro: 913,374 (Taif Governorate)
- Demonym: Taifian

GDP (PPP, constant 2015 values)
  - Year: 2023
  - Total (Metro): $26.2 billion
  - Per capita: $37,000
- Time zone: UTC+3 (GMT + 3)
- Postal Code: 26XXX
- Area code: +966 12
- Website: http://www.taifcity.gov.sa

Taif (Arabic: اَلطَّائِفُ, romanized: Aṭ-Ṭāʾif, lit. 'The circulated or encircled', Hejazi Arabic pronunciation: [atˤˈ tˤaː(j)ɪf]) is a city and governorate in Mecca Province in Saudi Arabia. Located at an elevation of 1,879 m (6,165 ft) in the slopes of the Hijaz Mountains, which themselves are part of the Sarat Mountains, the city has a population of 563,282 people in 2022, making it one of the most populous cities in the kingdom.

There is a belief that Taif is indirectly referred to in Quran 43:31. The city was visited by the Islamic prophet Muhammad, sometime in the early 7th century, and was inhabited by the tribe of Banu Thaqif. It is believed that they did not like the idea of him entering the city. It is still inhabited to this day by their descendants. As a part of the Hejaz, the city has seen many transfers-of-power throughout its history, with the last being during the Saudi conquest of Hejaz in 1925.

The city has been called the unofficial summer capital of Saudi Arabia and has also been called the best summer destination in Saudi Arabia as it enjoys a moderate weather during summer, unlike most of the Arabian Peninsula. The city owes its popularity among tourists to its many mountain resorts and moderate climate, even during the harsh summers of Arabia. The city is connected to the nearby resort town of Al-Hada via the iconic Highway 15 (Taif – Al-Hada Road). It stands out from the rest of the Hijazi region as it is a city that plays an active role in the agricultural output of Saudi Arabia and is the center of an agricultural area known for its cultivation of grapes, pomegranate, figs, roses and honey. Taif is also very active in the manufacturing of traditional attar, and is known locally as "City of the Roses" (Arabic: مَدِيْنَة ٱلْوُرُوْد, romanized: Madīnat al-Wurūd). Taif also hosts the historic Souq 'Okaz.

The Taif governorate is divided into 15 smaller municipalities, with Ta'if as the capital. The administration of the city itself is carried out by five municipalities, named North Taif, West Taif, East Taif, South Taif and New Taif. Taif is served by the Taif International Airport, with a larger international airport planned to open by 2030.

== Name ==
Much like many of the cities in the Hejazi region, the city of Ta'if had an older name: Wajj (وَجّ). This was also the name of the Valley of Wajj, a significant valley within Arabian and Islamic history.

The etymology of the city's current name, Taʾif (Arabic: اَلطَّائِفُ), comes from the Arabic root ط و ف, which could translate to "wanderer", "roamer", or "circulator"; the latter of which is the basis of the word Ṭawāf (طَوَاف), which literally translates to "circulation" or "circumambulation", and is used in the context of the circumambulation of the Kaaba.

Taʾif was given this name due to the wall that was built by the tribe of Banu Thaqif that circulated the city. In short, the city of Taʾif literally means the circulated or encircled city.

== History ==
In the 6th century A.D., the city of Ta'if was dominated by the Thaqif tribe, which still lives in and around the city of Ta'if today. It has been suggested that Jewish tribes who were displaced in the wars of the Himyarite Kingdom by Ethiopian Christians settled near Ta'if. The walled city was a religious centre as it housed the idol of the goddess Lāt, who was then known as "the lady of Ta'if." Its climate marked the city out from its dry and barren neighbours closer to the Red Sea. Wheat, vines and fruit orchards were grown around Ta'if, and this is how the city earned its title "the Garden of the Hejaz." Both Ta'if and Mecca were resorts of pilgrimage. Ta'if was more pleasantly situated than Mecca itself, and their people of Ta'if had close trading relations. The people of Ta'if carried on agriculture and fruit‑growing in addition to their trade activities.

In the early 7th century C.E., Muhammad, who was born in Makkah, preached Islam to the inhabitants of Mecca and the Hijaz, and encountered resistance from many of the people there. In 630, a battle took place at Hunayn, close to the city. Shortly after that, the unsuccessful siege of Ta'if took place. The city was assaulted by catapults from Banu Daus, but it repelled the attacks. The Battle of Tabuk in 631 left Tā'if completely isolated, so members of Thaqīf arrived in Makkah to negotiate the conversion of the city to Islam. The idol of Lāt was destroyed along with all other signs of the city's pagan past.

The city then went through many exchanges-of-power, but most of the action within these conflicts took place between Makkah and Medina, and Ta'if dwindled in importance in contrast to the two holy cities.

=== Under Ottoman rule ===
On 17 July 1517, the Sharif of Mecca capitulated to the Ottoman Sultan Selim I. As a sign of this, he surrendered to him the keys of the Islamic cities of Mecca and Medina. As part of the Hijaz, Ta'if was also given over to Ottoman control and the city remained Ottoman for a further three centuries, until in 1802, when it was taken by rebels allied with the House of Saud. These forces then proceeded to take Mecca and Medina. The loss was keenly felt by the Ottoman Empire, which viewed itself as the protector of the holy cities. The Ottoman sultan, Mahmud II, called upon the Wali of Egypt, Muhammad Ali, who launched an attack on the Hejaz and reconquered Ta'if in 1813.

In 1813, the Swiss traveler and orientalist Johann Ludwig Burckhardt visited Ta'if and left an eyewitness account of the city just after its recapture by the Muhammad Ali, with whom he obtained several interviews while he was there. Burckhardt reported that the wall and ditch around the city had been built by Othman el-Medhayfe. There were three gates and several towers on the city walls, which, however, were weak, being in some places only 45 cm (18 in) thick. Burckhardt stated that the castle had been built by Sharif Ghalib ibn Musa'id. He noted the destruction of the city caused by the conquest of 1802. Most of the buildings were still in ruin while he was there, and the tomb of 'Abdullah ibn 'Abbas – cousin of Muhammad and ancestor of the Abbasids – had been severely damaged. He also recorded that the population of the city was still mostly Thaqīfi. In terms of trade, the city was an entrepôt for coffee.

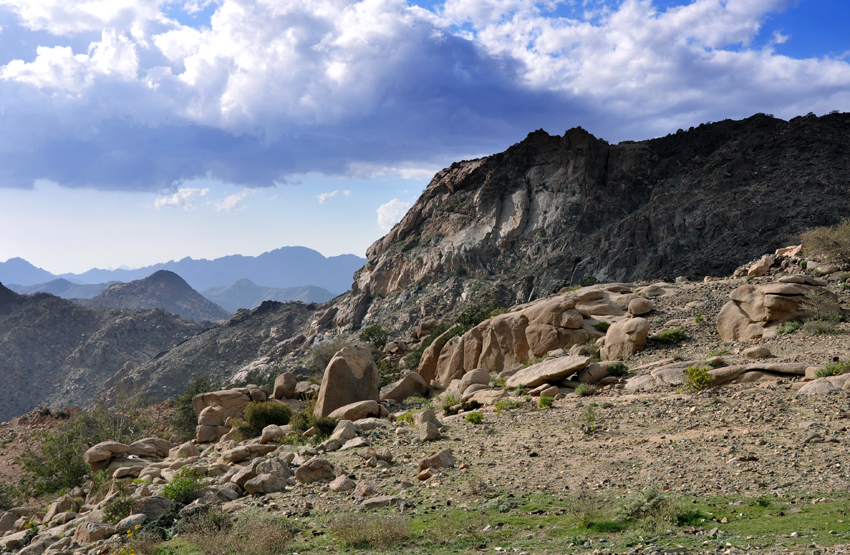
Landscape from south of Ta'if

The castle and military barracks in Ta'if were repaired by the Ottomans in 1843, a hükûmet konağı – mansion for government business – was built in 1869, and a post office was established sometime later.

=== Arab Revolt ===
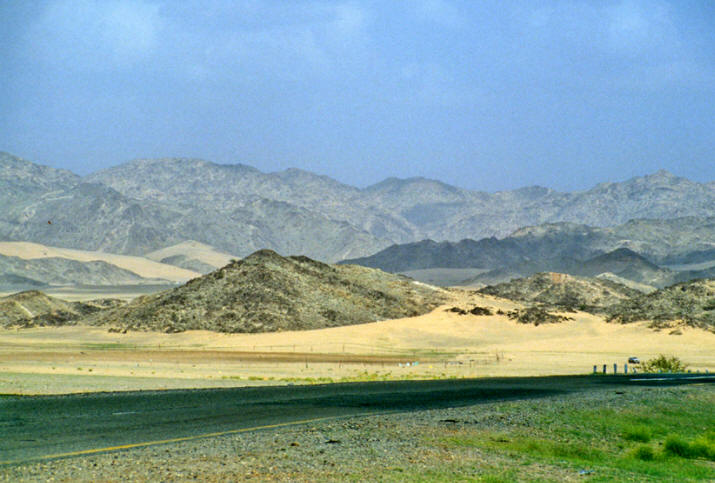
Road to Ta'if in the foreground, with the Hijaz Mountains in the background

Prior to the Arab Revolt, Ahmed Bey had been made the commander of Ottoman forces in Tā'if. He had under him a force of 3,000 soldiers and 10 pieces of mountain artillery. Ghalib Pasha, the governor of the Hejaz was also present in the city. In 1916, the Hashemites launched their revolt against the Ottoman Empire in Mecca in June. That city had fallen and then in July, Abdullah, the eldest son of the Hashemite leader and Sharif of Mecca, Husayn ibn Ali, came with seventy men to Tā'if.

Whilst his activities in the area aroused the suspicion of Ahmed Bey, Ghalib Pasha was unconcerned by so small a force. Abdullah secretly built up his army to 5,000 men. He then cut the telegraph wires to the city and took the offensive. All Hashemite assaults on the city were repelled by the mountain guns, and both sides settled down to an uneasy siege. However, Hashemite guns were slowly brought up to Tā'if, and then the city held out a little longer; before finally surrendering on 22 September. The city thus later became a part of the self-proclaimed Hashemite Kingdom of Hejaz.

=== Saudi conquest and modern history ===
Ta'if did not remain in Hashemite hands for very long. Tensions between the King of the Hejaz, Husayn ibn Ali, and Abdulaziz al-Saud, the Emir of Nejd and Hasa, soon broke out into violence. Although hostilities subsided in 1919, by September 1924, the then Saudi-sponsored Ikhwan militia, under the leadership of Sultan bin Bajad and Khaled bin Luwai', was ready to attack Ta'if. The city was supposed to have been defended by the king's son, 'Ali, but he fled in panic with his troops. Three hundred of 'Ali's men were slain by the Ikhwan in what became known as the Ta'if massacre. In 1926, Abdulaziz al-Saud was officially recognized as the new King of Hejaz. Ta'if remained a part of the Kingdom of Hejaz until Abdulaziz al-Saud unified his two kingdoms and consolidated them into the Kingdom of Saudi Arabia in 1932. In 1934 the treaty was signed here that established the boundary lines between Yemen and the kingdom. The king himself was later to die in the city on 9 November 1953, as did King Khalid on 13 June 1982.

Ta'if was still little more than a medieval city when the Saudis took control of it. However, they later embarked on a project of modernizing the city. Saudi Arabia's first public power generator was set up in Ta'if in the late 1940s. In terms of building roads to the isolated city, in 1965 the then King Faisal inaugurated the 54 mi (87 km) mountain highway between Mecca and Ta'if, now part of Highway 15 and known as the Taif – Al-Hada Road. In 1974, the approximately-650-kilometer Ta'if-Abha–Jizan highway was commissioned part of the Highway 15. By the 1991 Gulf War, Ta'if was such a modern city in terms of communications that it was chosen as the site of the Rendon Group's television and radio network, which was used for communication with Kuwait during the Iraqi occupation.

== Geography ==
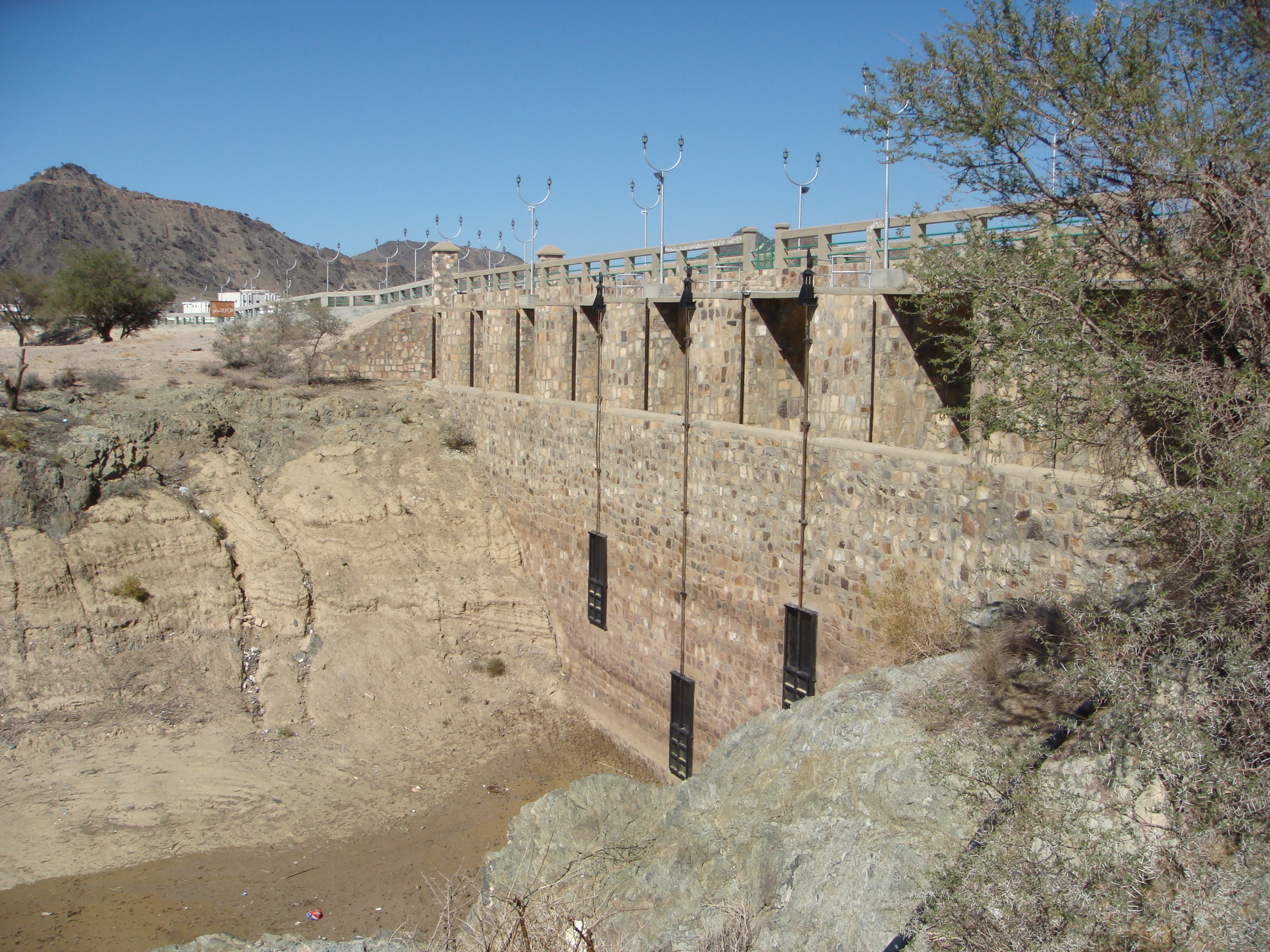
Historic sadd (سَدّ, dam) in Ta'if

The entirety of the Ta'if governorate is situated on a raised valley surrounded by the Hejaz Mountains (part of the Sarat mountains) to the west and south. The city is situated at an elevation of 1,879 m (6,165 ft) above mean sea level. For comparison, the surrounding mountains which separate Ta'if from nearby villages such as Al-Hada and Ash-Shafa, range in height anywhere from 2,000–3,500 m (6,600–11,500 ft). Ta'if is known to have had many wadis with running water before, suggested by the presence of dams along many of these. Taif's highest point, the Jebel Daka is even the fifth highest peak of Saudi Arabia.

=== Climate ===
Ta'if has a hot desert climate (Köppen climate classification BWh), with hot summers and mild winters. It is much cooler in Ta'if during the summertime than in other parts of Saudi Arabia, particularly compared to Riyadh. Precipitation is low, but all months see some rain, with more rain in spring and late autumn than in other months.

Climate data for Ta'if (1991-2020)
Month	Jan	Feb	Mar	Apr	May	Jun	Jul	Aug	Sep	Oct	Nov	Dec	Year
Record high °C (°F)	32.0 (89.6)	33.0 (91.4)	34.0 (93.2)	35.2 (95.4)	39.0 (102.2)	40.2 (104.4)	41.0 (105.8)	40.0 (104.0)	40.0 (104.0)	36.0 (96.8)	32.5 (90.5)	30.0 (86.0)	41.0 (105.8)
Mean daily maximum °C (°F)	23.1 (73.6)	25.3 (77.5)	27.7 (81.9)	30.6 (87.1)	33.9 (93.0)	36.3 (97.3)	35.6 (96.1)	36.0 (96.8)	35.2 (95.4)	31.1 (88.0)	26.8 (80.2)	24.2 (75.6)	30.5 (86.9)
Daily mean °C (°F)	15.8 (60.4)	17.7 (63.9)	20.2 (68.4)	23.2 (73.8)	26.5 (79.7)	29.6 (85.3)	29.3 (84.7)	29.5 (85.1)	28.2 (82.8)	23.7 (74.7)	19.6 (67.3)	16.9 (62.4)	23.3 (74.0)
Mean daily minimum °C (°F)	8.7 (47.7)	10.3 (50.5)	12.8 (55.0)	16.0 (60.8)	19.3 (66.7)	22.8 (73.0)	23.6 (74.5)	23.8 (74.8)	21.0 (69.8)	16.0 (60.8)	12.5 (54.5)	9.8 (49.6)	16.4 (61.5)
Record low °C (°F)	−1.5 (29.3)	0.0 (32.0)	0.5 (32.9)	4.0 (39.2)	5.6 (42.1)	13.9 (57.0)	13.3 (55.9)	13.3 (55.9)	11.4 (52.5)	8.0 (46.4)	5.0 (41.0)	−1.0 (30.2)	−1.5 (29.3)
Average precipitation mm (inches)	9.7 (0.38)	1.1 (0.04)	12.4 (0.49)	34.1 (1.34)	34.8 (1.37)	3.8 (0.15)	2.4 (0.09)	17.2 (0.68)	9.1 (0.36)	16.1 (0.63)	23.1 (0.91)	5.0 (0.20)	168.8 (6.65)
Average precipitation days (≥ 1.0 mm)	1.2	0.3	1.3	3.7	3.9	0.5	0.6	1.9	0.9	2.1	2.5	1.0	20.0
Average relative humidity (%)	61	54	47	47	38	25	27	31	33	42	56	61	44
Mean monthly sunshine hours	260.4	265.6	285.2	294.0	306.9	321.0	334.8	331.7	270.0	291.4	255.0	244.9	3,460.9
Mean daily sunshine hours	8.4	9.4	9.2	9.8	9.9	10.7	10.8	10.7	9.0	9.4	8.5	7.9	8.6
Source 1: World Meteorological Organization, Deutscher Wetterdienst (sun)
Source 2:

=== Natural landmarks ===
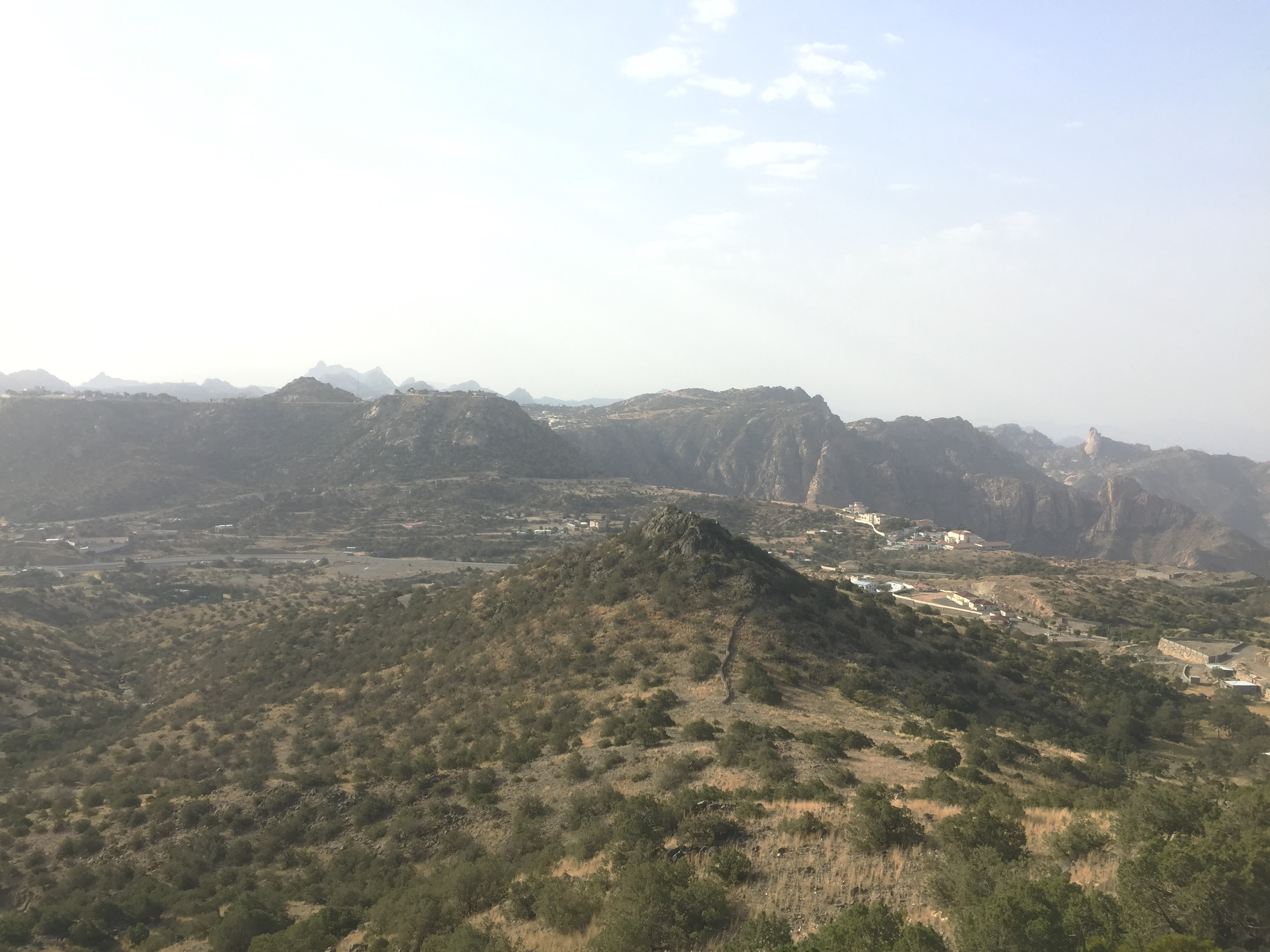
Jabal Dakka near Ash-Shafa

Al-Rudaf Park is a large natural park in South Ta'if, where trees stand amidst weathered granite rocks. The site also has a small zoo. Additionally, the park has a large lake with fountains and cannons. The Ta'if rose plantation is a complex of rose fields filled with small fragrant pink roses that are distilled into expensive Ta'if rose oil. This especially concerns the famous 30-petal Damask rose (Rosa damascena trigintipetala), whose scent has been described as a robust, spicy, and dizzyingly complex scent which has been used by several luxury perfume brands, including Ormonde Jayne, Chanel, Guerlain and Hermès.

The Nuqbat al-Hamra' park near Al-Hada is a large nature preserve at an elevation of 2,100 metres (6,900 feet) above sea level. Ash-Shafā is a small village situated high up in the mountains at an elevation of 2,200 to 2,500 metres (7,200 to 8,200 feet) above sea level, rich in agricultural products. The fruit gardens of Ta'if are located here. A camel ride is available, and Jabal Dakka is within view of the village. The Saiysad National Park is located in New Ta'if.

== Economy and development ==
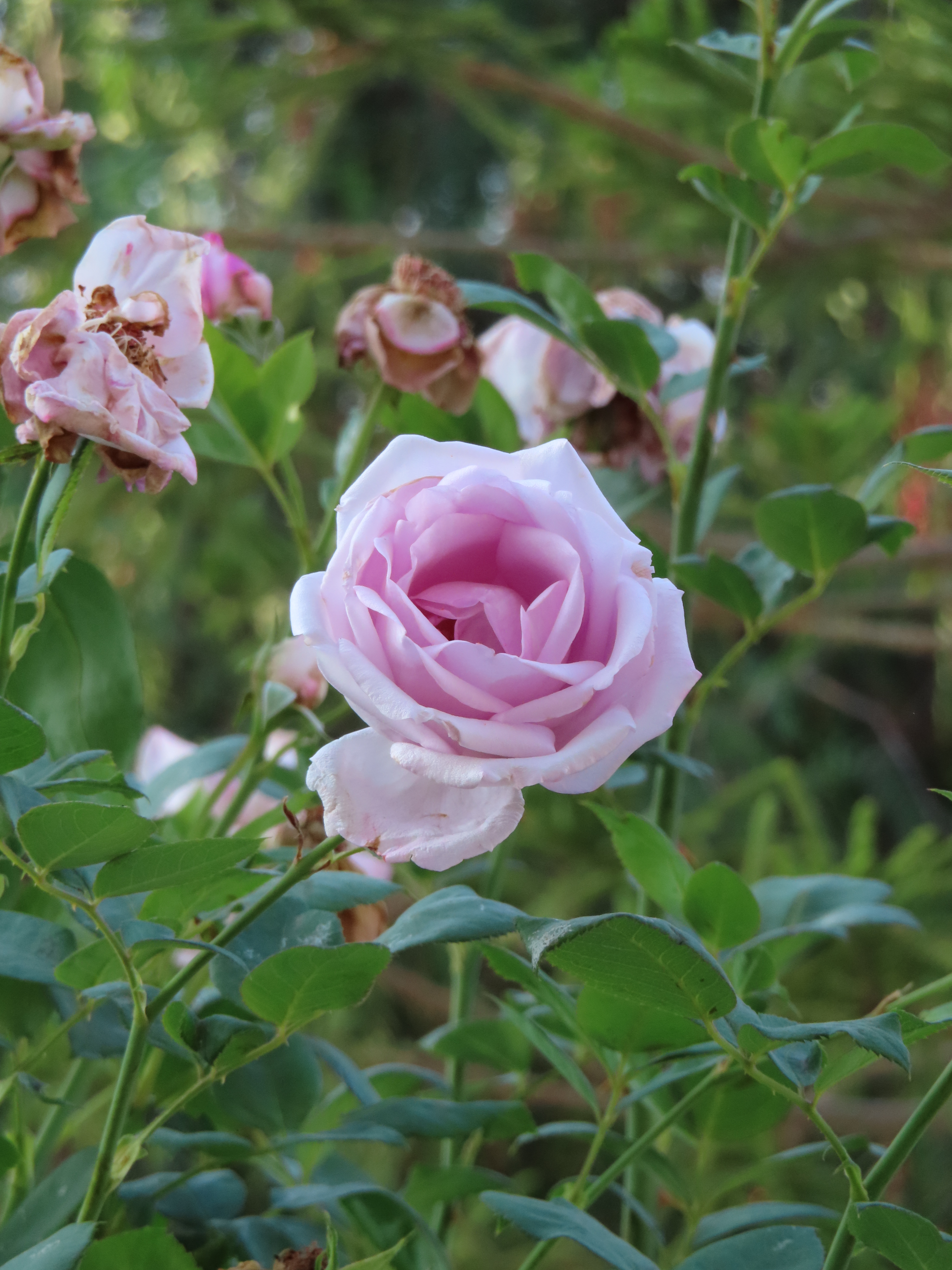
Rosa × damascena (R. damascena trigintipetala) flower in Ta'if

Historically, Ta'if's economy depended on agriculture and the cultivation of roses, which were traded throughout Central Asia and Transoxiana. Ta'if's modern economy is still mostly dependent on agriculture and perfumes, but an increasing diversification project has been taking place in order to combat the city's heavy dependence on these two industries. The distilled rose oil from the Rosa × damascena plant has been traditionally used as an attar in the Middle East, usually as a masculine fragrance, and due to its cultivation in Ta'if, it has gained the name "Ta'if rose", which in 2024 was included in the UNESCO Representative List of the Intangible Cultural Heritage of Humanity.

On October 1, 2017, King Salman of Saudi Arabia inaugurated the "New Ta'if" project, a $3.9 billion project aiming at establishing a new, international airport in the city, dubbed the Ta'if International Airport, renovation and modernization of the historic Souk 'Okaz, establishment of the Oasis of Technology, which is expected to include an Antonov aircraft manufacturing and assembly plant, an industrial airport with a 3.5-km runway, a solar farm covering 25,000 square metres (270,000 sq ft) expected to produce 30 MW of electricity, the Residential Suburb, which is expected to include 10,000 residential units, the Industrial City, an 11-square-kilometre (4.2 sq mi) industrial city with a complex for heavy, medium and light industries along with a vocational training center, and the University City, a 16-square-kilometre (6.2 sq mi) university projected to be built in the Saiysad National Park.

== Culture ==
=== Arts ===
The Souk 'Okaz, one of the best known pre-Islamic souks, was not only a market, but in many ways, a historic theater, where sociopolitical and commercial exchanges took place between the tribes of pre-Islamic Arabia. People from around the peninsula would come to visit the idol of the goddess Lat. This is proof that Ta'if has long been a historic center for trade and the arts in the Arabian Peninsula; contemporary theaters in the area include the 'Okaz Market Theater and the recently opened King 'Abdullah Park Theater. A performing arts theater is also located in the nearby town of Qia and is known as the Folk Theater of Qia.

In the framework of Saudi Seasons initiative, the first Ta'if Season took place on August 1, 2019. Artists from seven countries participated in the event and a wide range of activities were overseen. Three main events have taken place during the season including the Souk 'Okaz festival and a camel race. As a sideline to the event, a rose festival in the city as well as a number of concerts and plays were held.

=== Sports ===
Like most of Saudi Arabia, the most popular sport among Saudis in Ta'if is football. Wej SC (Saudi Arabian Football Federation) plays at King Fahd Sports City in North Ta'if near as-Sayl as-Saghir and is the football team representing the city. The expatriate minority in the city has brought several other games with them to Ta'if, including cricket, badminton and volleyball. Al Hawiyah Stadium is the local football pitch.

== Infrastructure ==
=== Education ===
In 2004, Taif University was established which offers both undergraduate and graduate programs across four colleges and 16 faculties. It has four campuses located in the Taif Governorate, with the main campus in Al-Hawiyya.

In 2014 the Canadian Niagara College opened a campus in Taif with programs in tourism, hospitality, and business. This effort is part of the Colleges of Excellence program. The college faced criticism for being open to men only, including from the Canadian Association of University Teachers. As of 2023 it is unclear whether the campus in Taif is still active, with even the main website of Niagara College KSA having mixed information.

=== Mosques ===
There are a number of historical mosques in the city. The Abd Allah ibn al-Abbas Mosque houses the remains of Abdullah ibn Abbas, a cousin and companion of Muhammad. The Mosque of Addas is named after Addas, an Iraqi Christian who embraced Islam after meeting Muhammad.

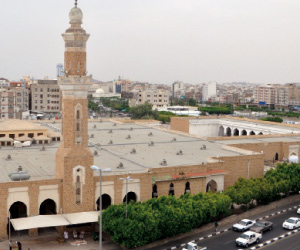
Abd Allah ibn al-Abbas Mosque

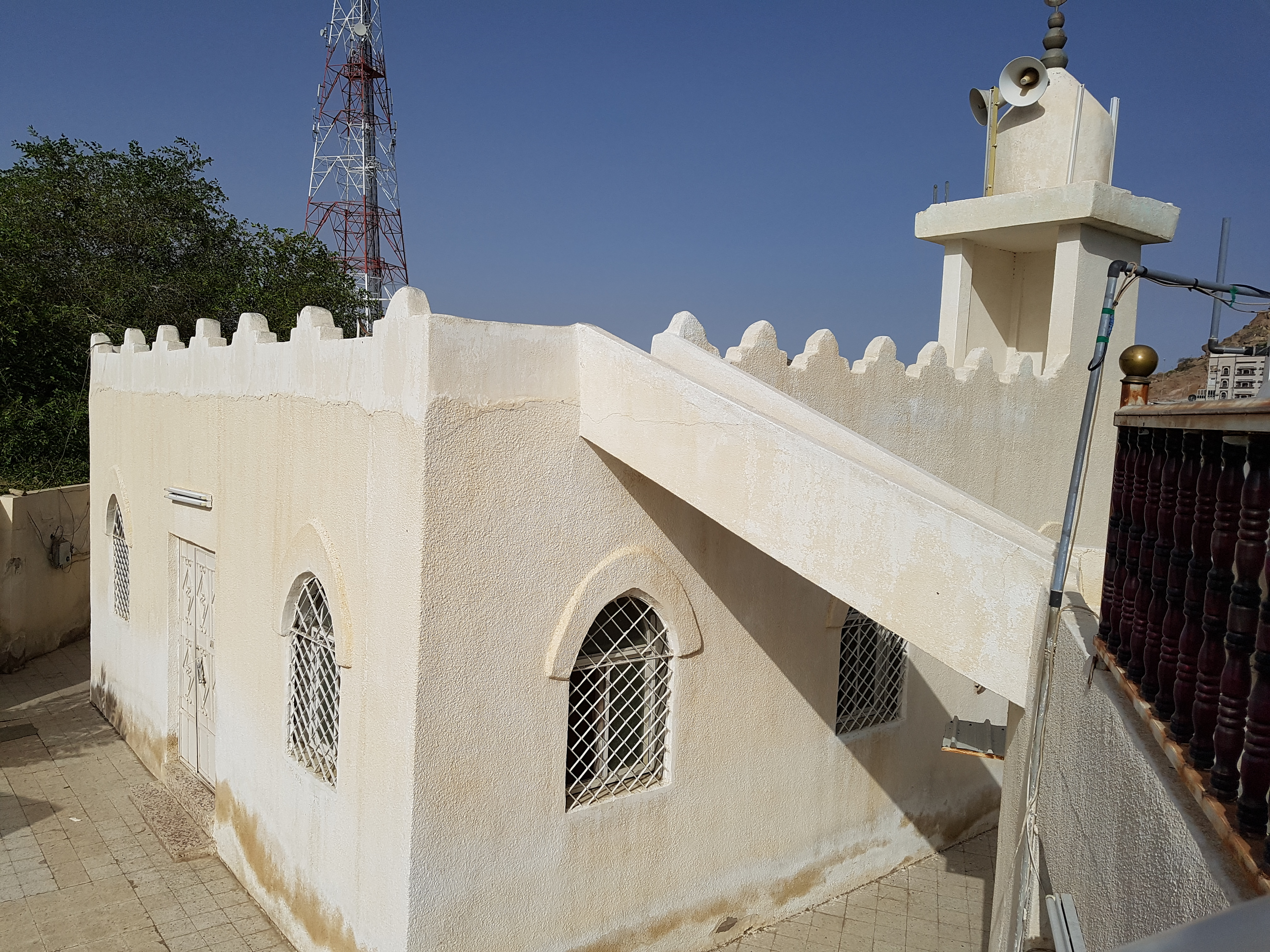
Mosque of Addas

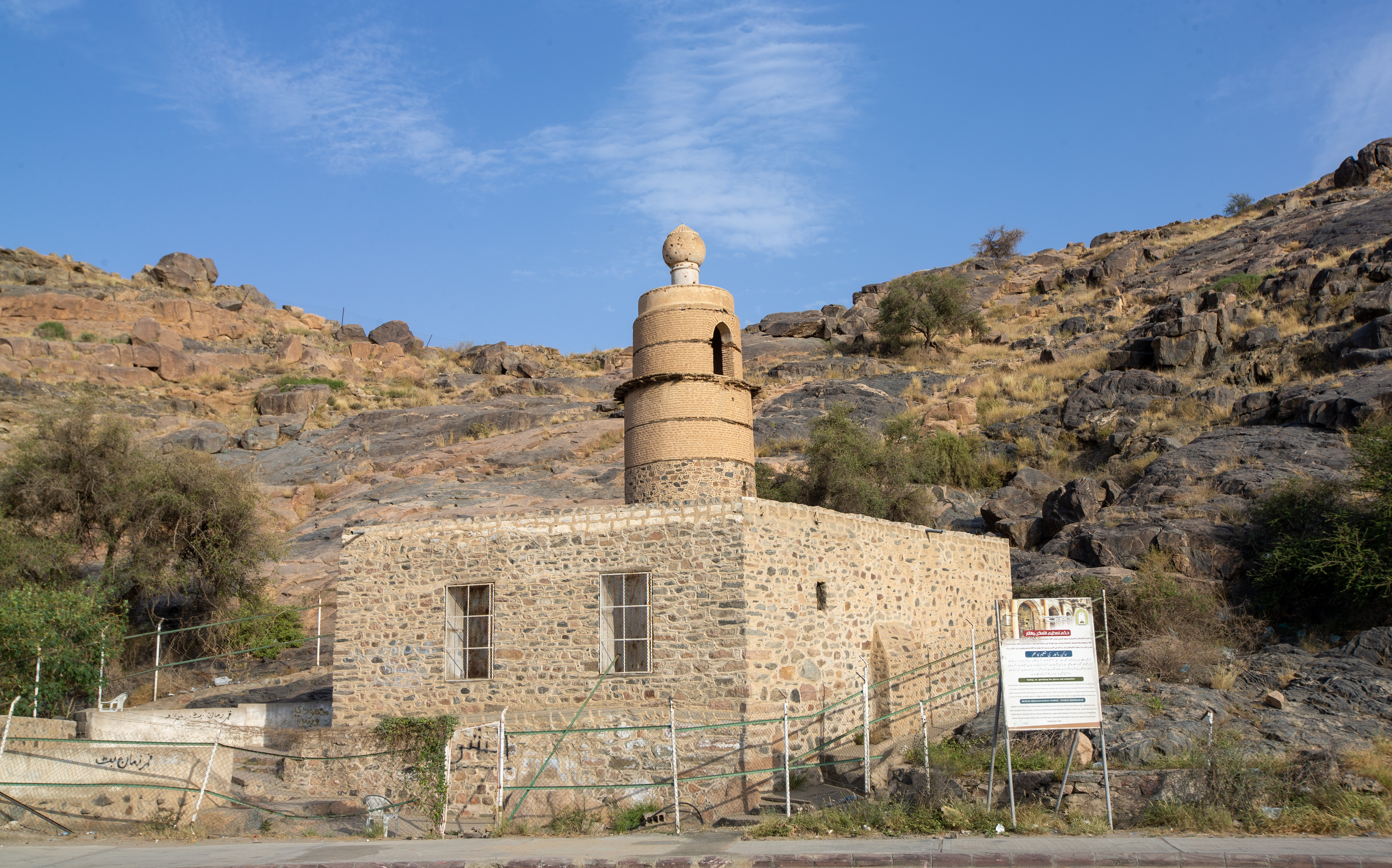
Masjid Al-Qantarah,
abandoned and partially ruined

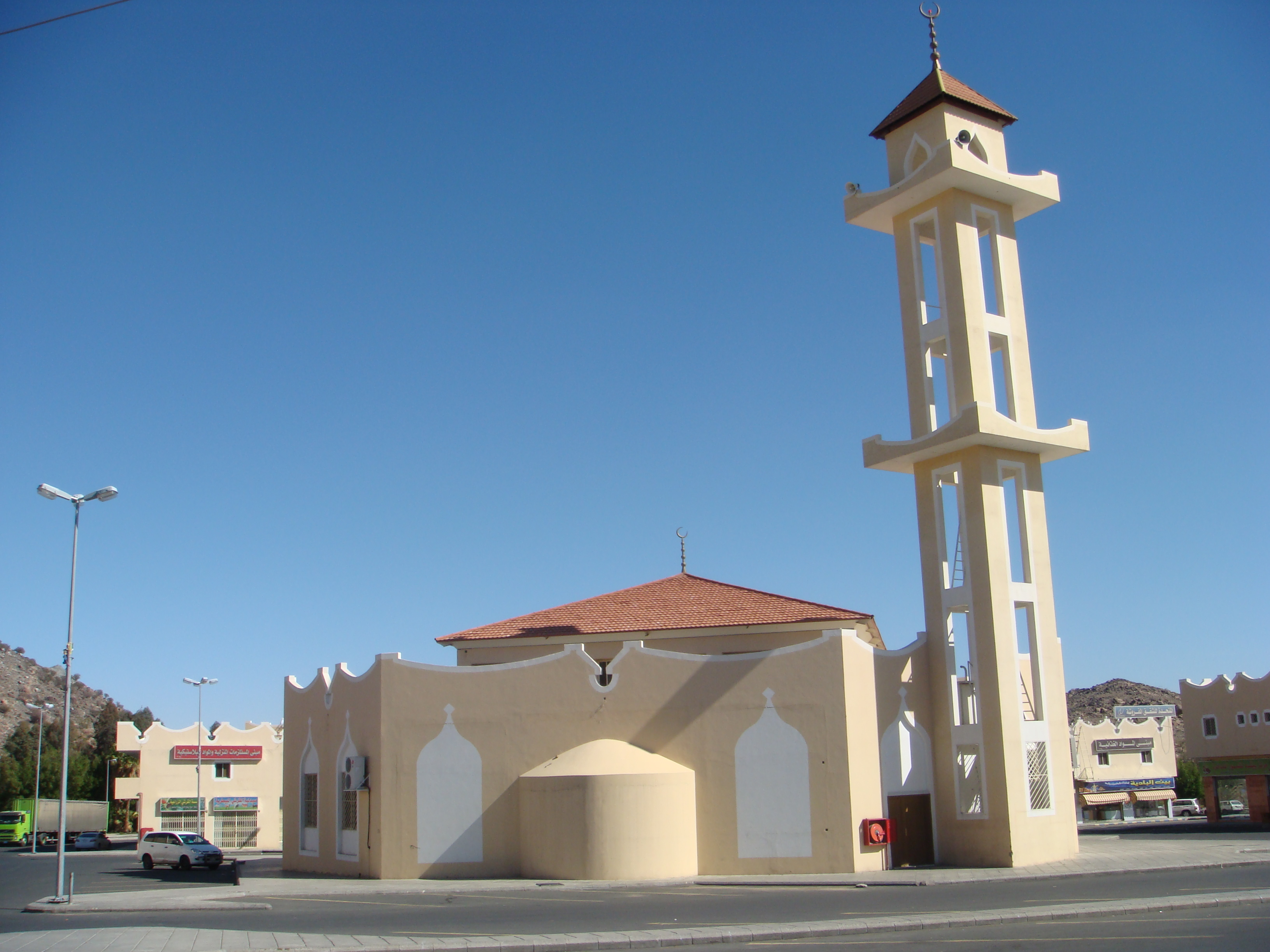

=== Museums and historic landmarks ===
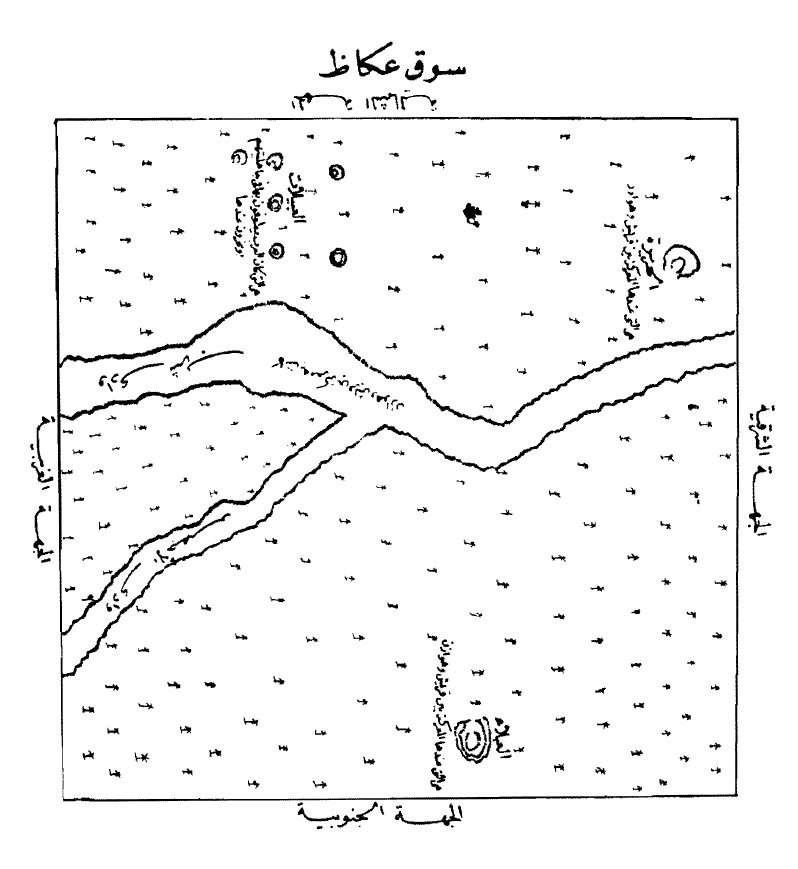
Map of the historic Souk 'Okaz from the book Sahih al-Akhbar

Located 40 km (25 mi) north of Ta'if is the site of the Souk 'Okaz, the largest and best known of the pre-Islamic souks. The souq was a scene of annual social, political and commercial gatherings. It was also the location of competitive recitation of poetry and prose. The buildings remain, including prominent outlines of walls of basaltic stone. Wadi Mitna is a wadi believed to be the location where Muhammad sought refuge from the tribes of Hawazin and Thaqif in 619 AD, after he was stoned by the tribes. He was later given sanctuary by his fellows in a small house, which has now been converted into a mosque.

Shubra Palace is the regional museum of Ta'if, housed in a building built around 1900, which served as Ibn Saud's lodging in the 1930s, and was also used as the Presidency of the Council of Ministers of Saudi Arabia during King Faisal's reign. The Turkish Fort was a fort located near the Souk 'Okaz, many battles have been fought here and many prominent graves can be found, though only a small part of the original fort remains. Legend has it that Lawrence of Arabia also fought here. The Badawi Fortress is located in the southern reaches of East Ta'if.

=== Transportation ===
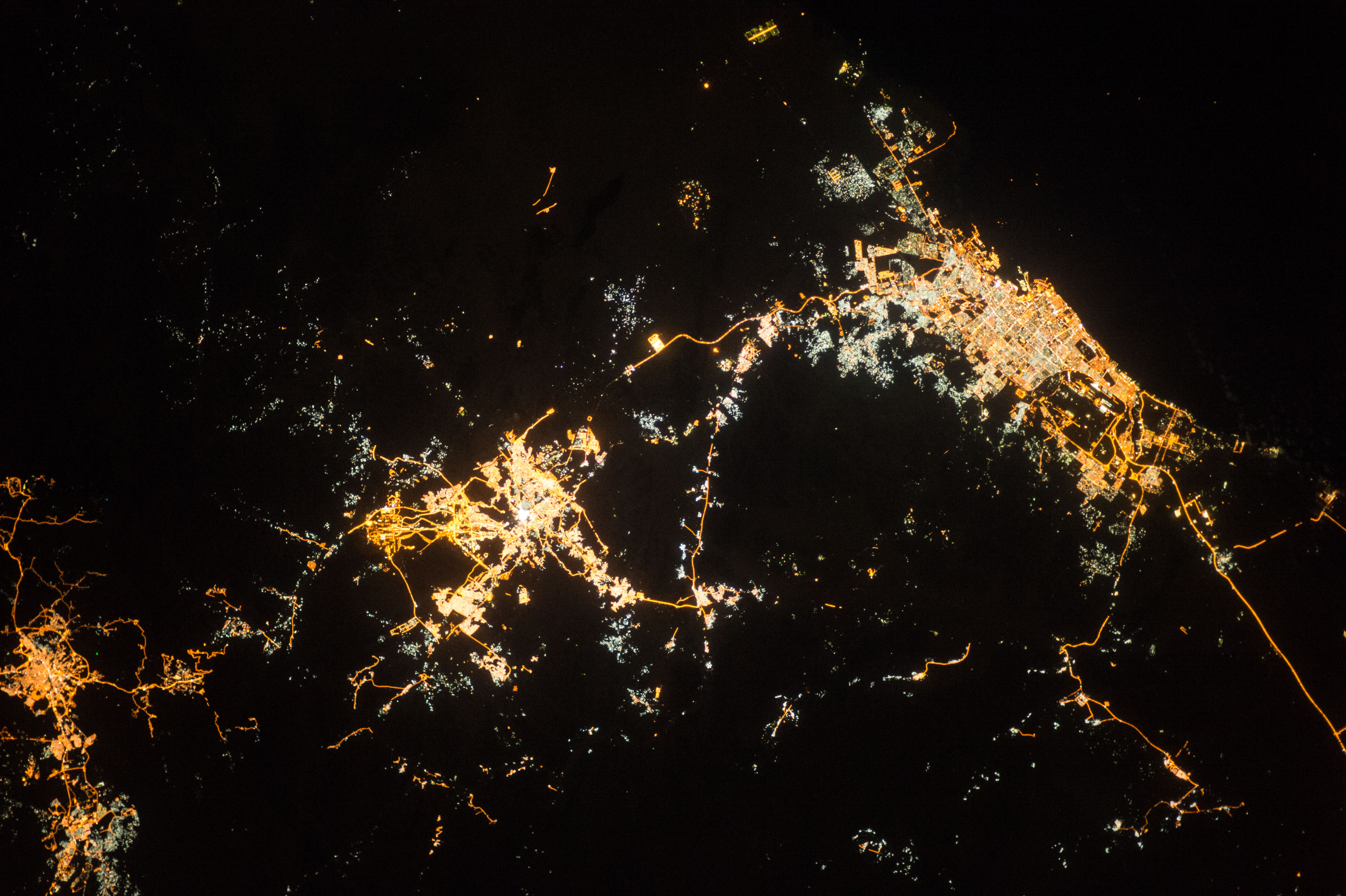
Left to right: Ta'if, Mecca and Jeddah seen from the ISS at night

Due to Ta'if's location in the mountains, most major highways either bend around the city or avoid the region completely. The only major highway in the Saudi Arabian network to pass through Ta'if is Highway 15 (known to locals as the Taif – Al-Hada Road) which arrives from Mecca in the west, bends around the mountains through Al-Hada, passes through the center of Ta'if, and travels to Abha and Khamis Mushait via Baha and Baljurashi. Ta'if is connected to Highway 40 via Highway 267 and Highway 287. Highway 267 forms the western part of the Ta'if beltway, but then continues southward toward Ash-Shafa, bypassing Mecca by using a longer route and gives access to Highway 304, Highway 301, Highway 40 and Highway 290 via Highway 298.

Ta'if is served by the Taif International Airport. It was scheduled to open in 2020, but this had been delayed due to the COVID-19 pandemic. The new airport is mainly designed to cater to pilgrims of Hajj and 'Umrah, and to relieve pressure off the King Abdulaziz International Airport in Jeddah.

== Notable people ==
=== Tribes ===
The historically well-known tribe of Thaqif still lives in and around the city of Ta'if. 'Utaibah is another Adnani tribe which still lives in Ta'if. Banu Harith is one of the Qahtani Arabs tribes living around Ta'if in Saudi Arabia. The tribe claims a very large area around the city in the area between Ta'if and Qunfudhah in Saudi Arabia. Thu al-Isba' al-'Adwani was an Arabic poet and a man of wisdom from the Banu 'Adwan tribe that historically lived in the northern parts of Ta'if. Furthermore, Banu Thabit are people descended from Thabit and the tribe is originally part of Hawazin clan.

=== Births in the pre-modern era ===
Pre-Islamic leaders of Banu Thaqif During the pre-Islamic era, the city was populated by the tribe of Thaqif. The city had then the following chieftains:

- 'Urwah ibn Mas'ud
- 'Abd-ya-Layl ibn 'Amr
- 'Uthman ibn Abu al-'Aas

Other important Islamic figures

- 'Uthman ibn 'Affan (579–656) — 3rd Rashidun Caliph and son-in-law of Muhammad
- Al-Hajjaj ibn Yusuf (661–714) — Umayyad-era Governor of Iraq and general
- Muhammad bin Qasim (695–715) — Umayyad general who conquered the Sindh and Punjab regions along the Indus River.
- Al-Hurr ibn Abd al-Rahman Fourth ruler of Al-Andalus during the Umayyad rule
- Sharif Ali ibn Ajlan ibn Rumaithah ibn Muhammad, son-in-law and successor of Sultan Ahmad of Brunei, father of Sultan Sulaiman, and a descendant of Muhammad

=== Births in the modern era ===
Monarchs and royals

- King Faisal I of Iraq (1885–1933) — 20th-century King of Syria and Iraq
- Prince Nayef bin 'Abdulaziz Al Saud (1934–2012) — former Crown Prince and Minister of Interior of Saudi Arabia

Others

- Hadi Soua'an Al-Somaily (1976–present) — First Saudi Olympic medal winner.
- Mutlaq Hamid Al-Otaibi (1937–95) — poet and writer; member of the Faculty of Sharia' at the Umm al-Qura' University
- Hani Hanjour (1972–2001) — 9/11 hijacker pilot who crashed American Airlines flight 77 into The Pentagon.
- Mohammed Alzeer, businessman

=== Deaths ===
- 'Abdullah ibn 'Abbas (619–687) — cousin of Muhammad
- Midhat Pasha (1822–83) — Ottoman grand vizier; assassinated by strangulation in prison
- Ibn Saud (1875–1953) — founder and 1st king of the Third Saudi State, the modern Kingdom of Saudi Arabia
- Khalid of Saudi Arabia (1913–1982) — 4th king of Saudi Arabia and son of Ibn Saud

== See also ==
- Al-Kateb House
- Banu Jadhimah
- Miqat of Qarnul-Manazil at As Sayl al Kabir
- Ta'if Agreement
- 'Utaybah
The contents of this article incorporate material from an entry in the Enciclopedia Libre Universal, published in Spanish under GFDL.
