= Ash Shafa =

Ash-Shafa Arabic: ٱلشَّفَا, romanized: Ash-Shafā
- Village
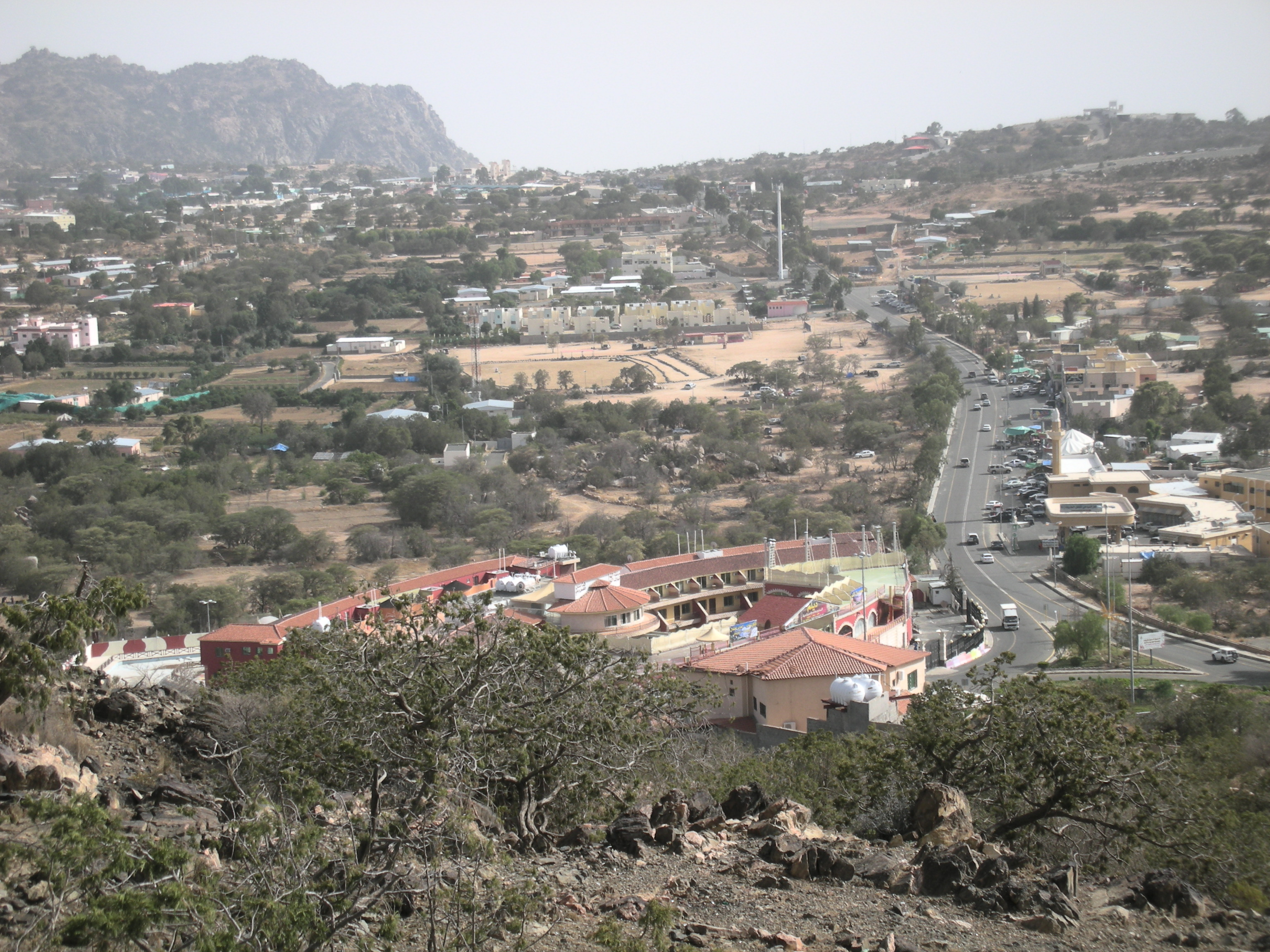

- Location in Saudi Arabia Ash-Shafa (Near East) Ash-Shafa (West and Central Asia)
- Coordinates: 21°04′10″N 40°18′43″E
- Country: Saudi Arabia
- Province: Makkah Region
- Governorate: Taif
- Time zone: UTC+3 (EAT)
  - Summer (DST): UTC+3 (EAT)

Ash-Shafā (Arabic: ٱلشَّفَا, lit. 'The Edge') is a village in Makkah Province, in western Saudi Arabia.

== Weather ==
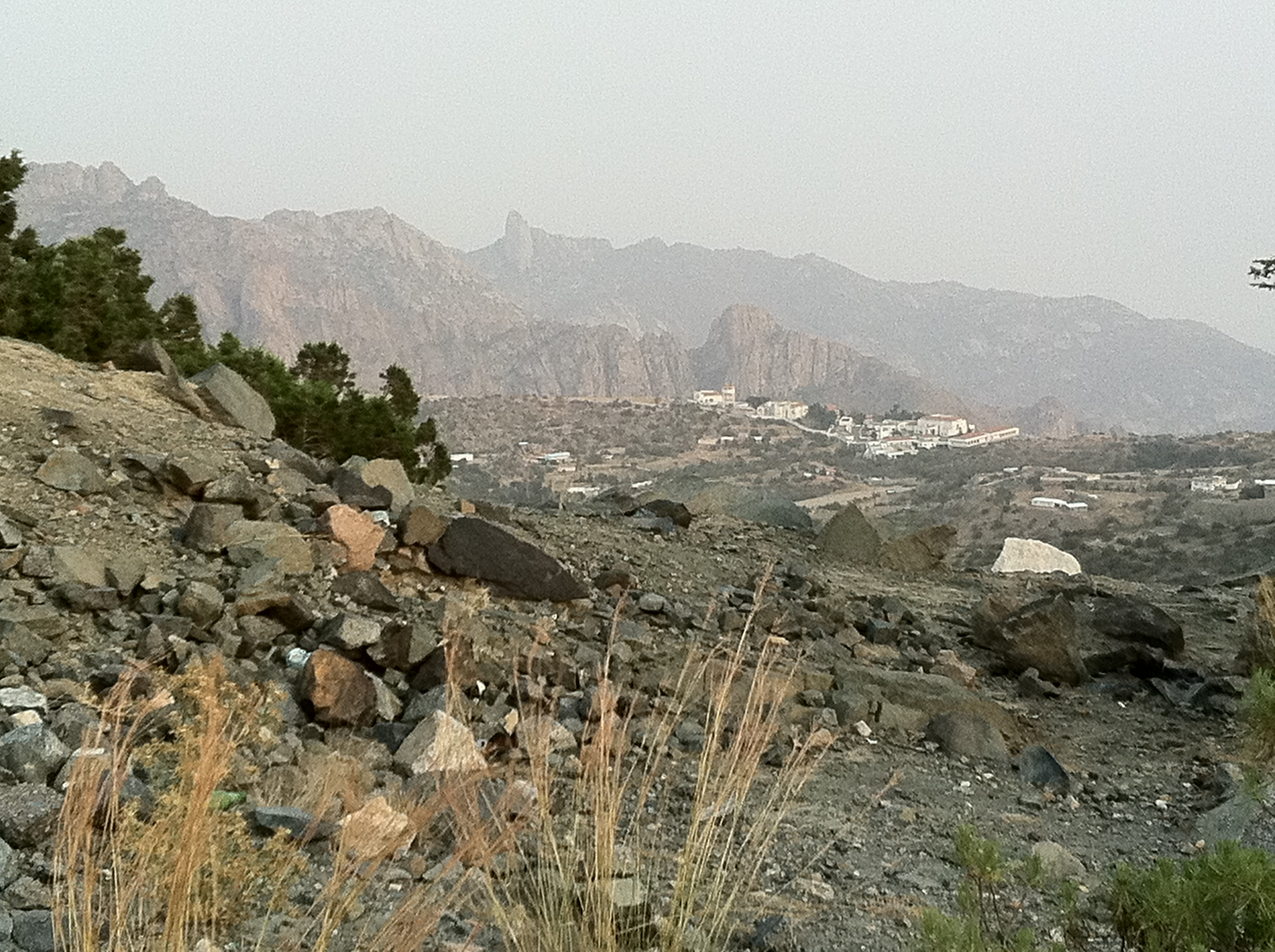
Jabal Daka near Ash-Shafa

Climate data for Ash Shafa
Month	Jan	Feb	Mar	Apr	May	Jun	Jul	Aug	Sep	Oct	Nov	Dec	Year
Mean daily maximum °C (°F)	17.2 (63.0)	19.2 (66.6)	21.6 (70.9)	24.3 (75.7)	27.5 (81.5)	30.4 (86.7)	29.7 (85.5)	29.6 (85.3)	29.6 (85.3)	24.9 (76.8)	21.0 (69.8)	17.9 (64.2)	24.4 (75.9)
Mean daily minimum °C (°F)	4.2 (39.6)	5.3 (41.5)	10.2 (50.4)	—	13.4 (56.1)	16.3 (61.3)	18.1 (64.6)	17.7 (63.9)	15.0 (59.0)	10.2 (50.4)	7.8 (46.0)	4.9 (40.8)	—
Average precipitation mm (inches)	17 (0.7)	7 (0.3)	27 (1.1)	42 (1.7)	28 (1.1)	4 (0.2)	6 (0.2)	21 (0.8)	7 (0.3)	17 (0.7)	21 (0.8)	11 (0.4)	208 (8.2)

== See also ==
- List of cities and towns in Saudi Arabia
  - Taif
- Regions of Saudi Arabia
- Sarat Mountains
  - Hijaz Mountains
