= Diba (surname) =

Diba is the surname. Notable people with the surname include:

- Abolhassan Diba (1894–1982), Iranian politician, businessman, and socialite
- Ad-Diba (also known as Mohamed Diab Al-Attar, 1927–2016), Egyptian footballer and referee
- Anouar Diba (born 1983), Dutch footballer
- Dikanda Diba (born 1966), Congolese long-distance runner
- Farah Pahlavi (née Diba, born 1938), widow and third wife of Mohammad Reza Pahlavi
- Johny Diba (born 1997), Congolese-born English footballer
- Kamran Diba (born 1937), Iranian architect
- Layla S. Diba Iranian-American curator, art historian
- Vasile Dîba (born 1954), Romanian canoer
- Viyé Diba (born 1954), Senegalese painter
- Yitzhak Kaduri (born Diba; died 2006), Iraqi-born rabbi
- Youssef Diba (born 1948) Syrian wrestler
- Yves Diba Ilunga (born 1987), Congolese footballer
