= Al Faqirah =

Al Faqīrah
- Village
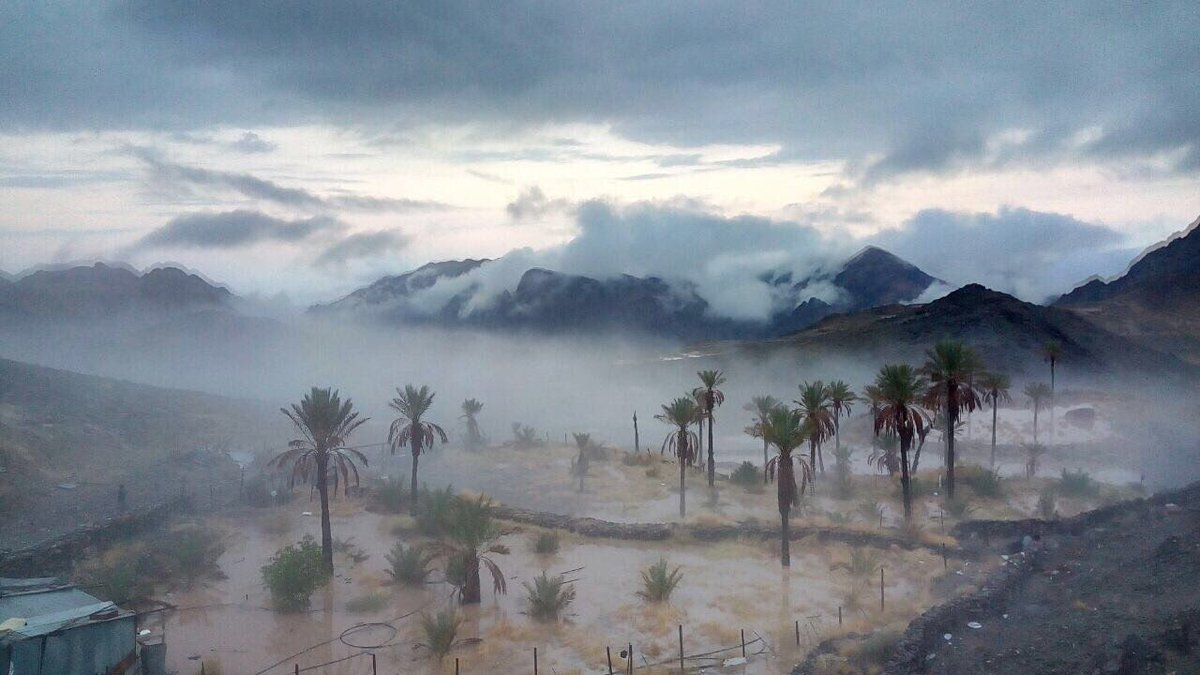
- Al Faqirah in April 2017

- Location in Saudi Arabia
- Coordinates: 23°25′18″N 39°42′35″E
- Country: Saudi Arabia
- Province: Al Madinah Province
- Time zone: UTC+3 (EAT)
  - Summer (DST): UTC+3 (EAT)

Al Faqīrah is a village in Al Madinah Province, in western Saudi Arabia.

== See also ==
- List of cities and towns in Saudi Arabia
- Regions of Saudi Arabia
