= Nakhawila =

Indigenous Shia Muslims

Total population
- 32,000

Regions with significant populations
- Medina, Wadi al-Fara

Languages
- Hejazi Arabic

Religion
- Twelver Shi'a Islam

Related ethnic groups
- Ismailis of Najran - Persians

The Nakhawila (Arabic: النخاولة) are a community of indigenous Hijazi Twelver Shias who have traditionally resided in and around the city of Medina in Saudi Arabia, numbering around 32,000—although no official or certain figures are available.

== Etymology ==
The origin of the name Nakhawila (singular: nakhwali) is unclear; however, it is most likely derived from the Arabic word nakhl, nakhla or nakhil (date palm) because the Nakhawila community is said to have worked in the palm groves around Medina. The word is believed to have been first used during the Ottoman rule of Hejaz and was first recorded by Abu Salim al-Ayyashi during his 1662-63 stay in Medina.

In modern Saudi Arabia the Nakhawila are officially known as al-nakhliyūn or al-nakhliya (singular: nakhli).

== Origins ==
The origin of the Nakhawila is unclear. Most members of the Nakhawila community claim descent from native Medinan Arab tribes such as the Khazraj or Hashemites, while others are claimed to be descended from black African slaves said to have been freed by Hasan ibn Ali and ordered to work on his farms. Other beliefs include that they are the descendants of African slaves, that they came from eastern Arabia, Iran or are from among the remnants of the Shiites of post-Fatimid Egypt.

== History ==
Historically, they have engaged in cultivating palm trees and other menial work. The Nakhawila were prohibited from living within the city walls of Medina and were not allowed to pray in Al-Masjid an-Nabawi or to bury their dead in Al-Baqi' cemetery. This was due to the popular Sunni belief that the Nakhawila would pollute these places. They were also prohibited by the Ottomans, and later by the Saudis (following widespread Sunni protests in 1937), from participating in elections. According to Johann Ludwig Burckhardt, the Nakhawila were "despised by the townspeople, because they openly profess heresy, and are moreover of humble degree. During his visit to Medina, Richard Francis Burton described the Nakhawila as "miserable schismatics".

During his stay in Medina, Abu Salim al-Ayyashi described a unique Nakhawila custom in which "almost every Thursday" they would visit the shrine of Ismail ibn Jafar and engage in various activities, such as feasting, circumcision of boys and ziyara. Such a custom may hint at an Ismaili past. Shiite pilgrims often use Nakhawila homes to stay in and conduct Shia rituals, such as mourning of the Imams, beyond the gaze of Sunnis in the city.

Following the fall of Medina during the Saudi conquest of Hejaz, the Nakhawila demolished the tombs of Al-Baqi' cemetery at the behest of the Wahhabi qadi Ibn Bulayhid.

During the mid-1970s, the Nakhawila were involved in serious communal disturbances in Medina.

For decades, the Nakhawila community in Medina was headed by Sheikh Muhammad Ali al-Amri, a Shia jurist who studied in Najaf under the guide of several notable scholars, up until his death on 24 January 2011. Al-Amri's son Hashim resumed his father's prayer leading position (Imam) at Medina's first Shia mosque, located at his father's farm.
