= Al Hada =

Al-Hada Arabic: ٱلْهَدَا, romanized: Al-Hadā
- Village
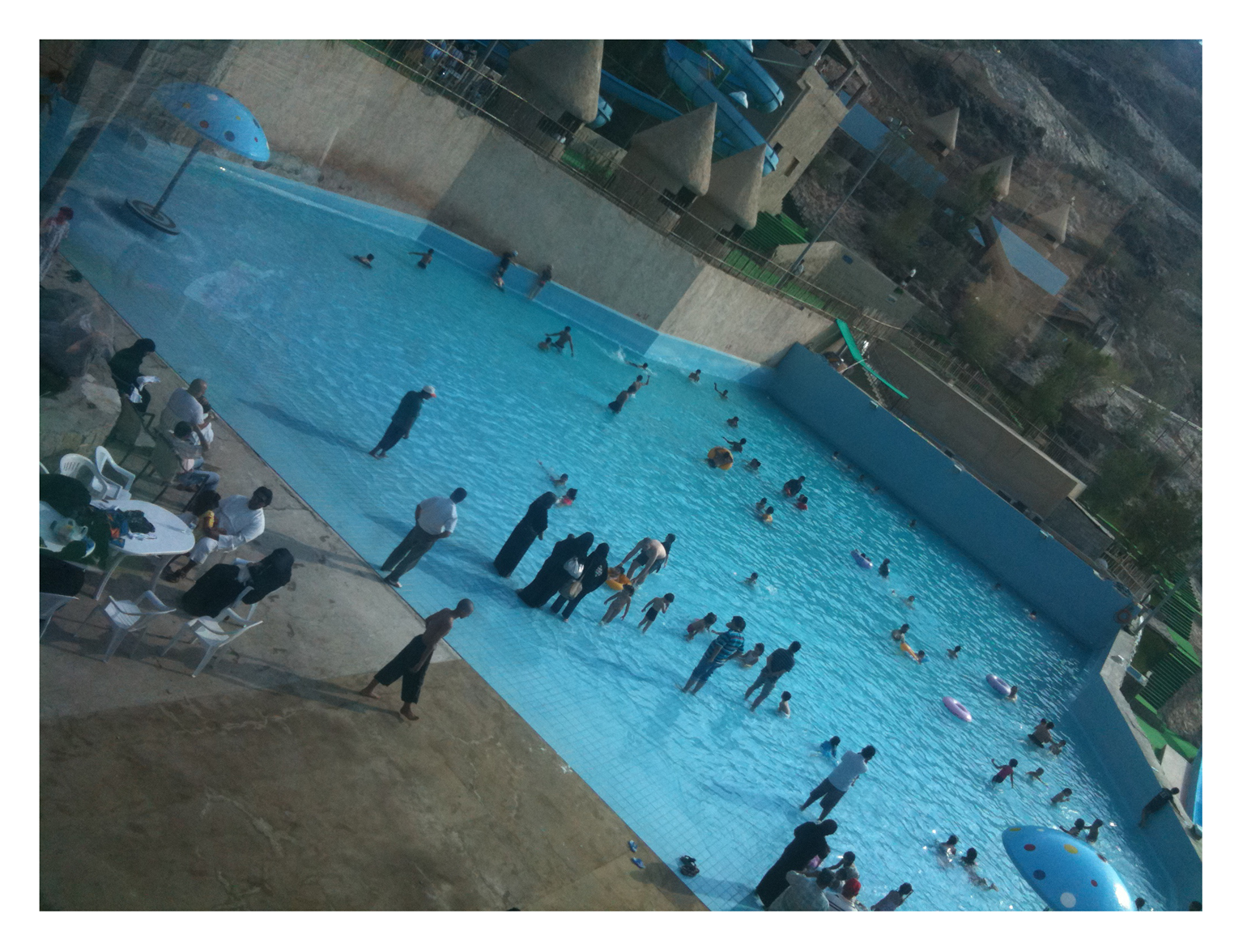
- Ramada Al Hada Hotel Telefrique Station

- Location in Saudi Arabia Al-Hada (Middle East) Al-Hada (West and Central Asia)
- Coordinates: 21°22′07″N 40°17′05″E
- Country: Saudi Arabia
- Province: Makkah
- Governorate: Taif
- Elevation: 2,000 m (6,600 ft)

Population
  - Total: 8,819
- Time zone: UTC+3 (EAT)
  - Summer (DST): UTC+3 (EAT)

Al-Hadā (Arabic: ٱلْهَدَا, lit. 'The Tranquility') is a mountain resort city in Mecca Province near the city of Taif in western Saudi Arabia. Having many five star hotels and theme Parks, it is attractive for tourists. Nearby is Jabal Hada (2,000 m (6,600 ft)).

== See also ==
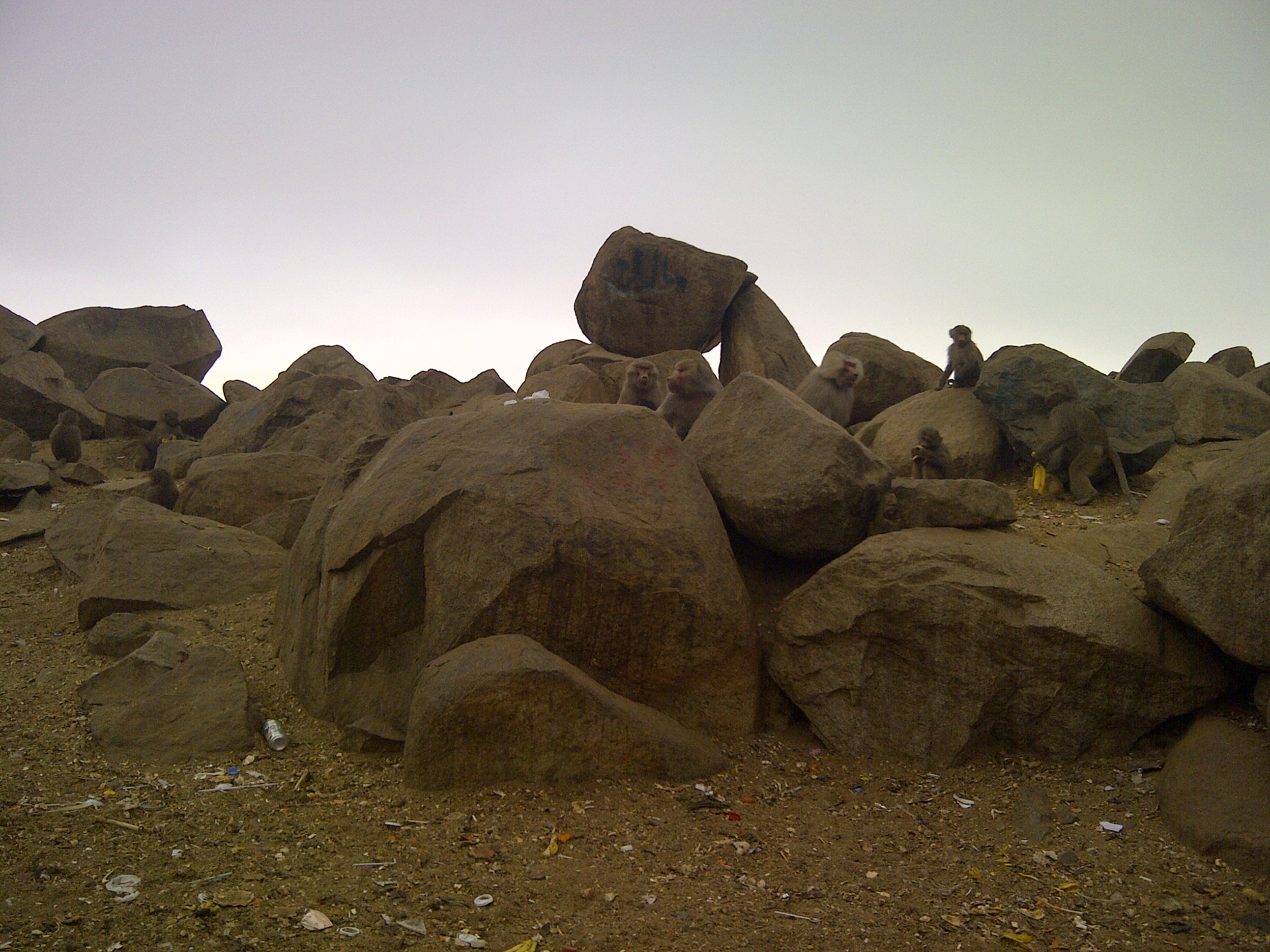
Hamadryas baboons in the vicinity

- List of cities and towns in Saudi Arabia
- Regions of Saudi Arabia
