= Al Madiq, Al Madinah =

Al Madiq
- Village
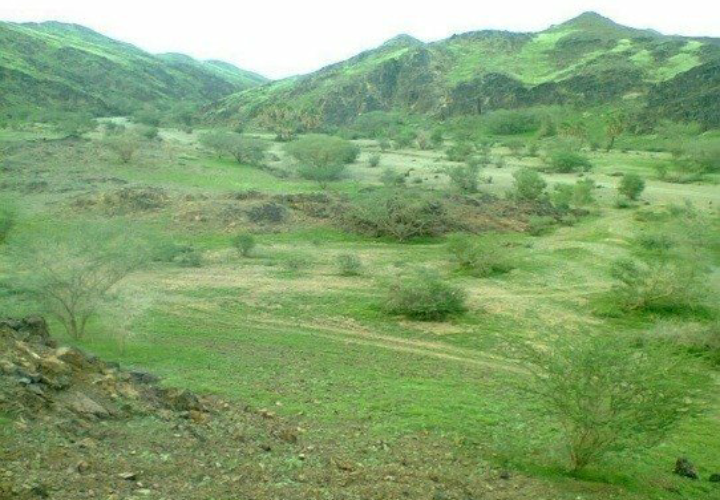
- المضيق وادي الفرع

- Location in Saudi Arabia
- Coordinates: 23°19′20″N 39°37′13″E
- Country: Saudi Arabia
- Province: Al Madinah Province
- Time zone: UTC+3 (EAT)
  - Summer (DST): UTC+3 (EAT)

Al Madiq is a village in Al Madinah Province, in western Saudi Arabia.

== See also ==
- List of cities and towns in Saudi Arabia
- Regions of Saudi Arabia
