= Abu Dhiba =

- Village
- Location in Saudi Arabia
- Coordinates: 23°11′56″N 39°33′28″E
- Country: Saudi Arabia
- Province: Medina Province
- Time zone: UTC+3 (EAT)
  - Summer (DST): UTC+3 (EAT)

Abu Dhiba or Abu Diba is a village in Medina Province, in western Saudi Arabia.

== See also ==
- List of cities and towns in Saudi Arabia
- Regions of Saudi Arabia
