= Hejaz Mountains =

Mountain range in western Saudi Arabia

Hijaz Mountains
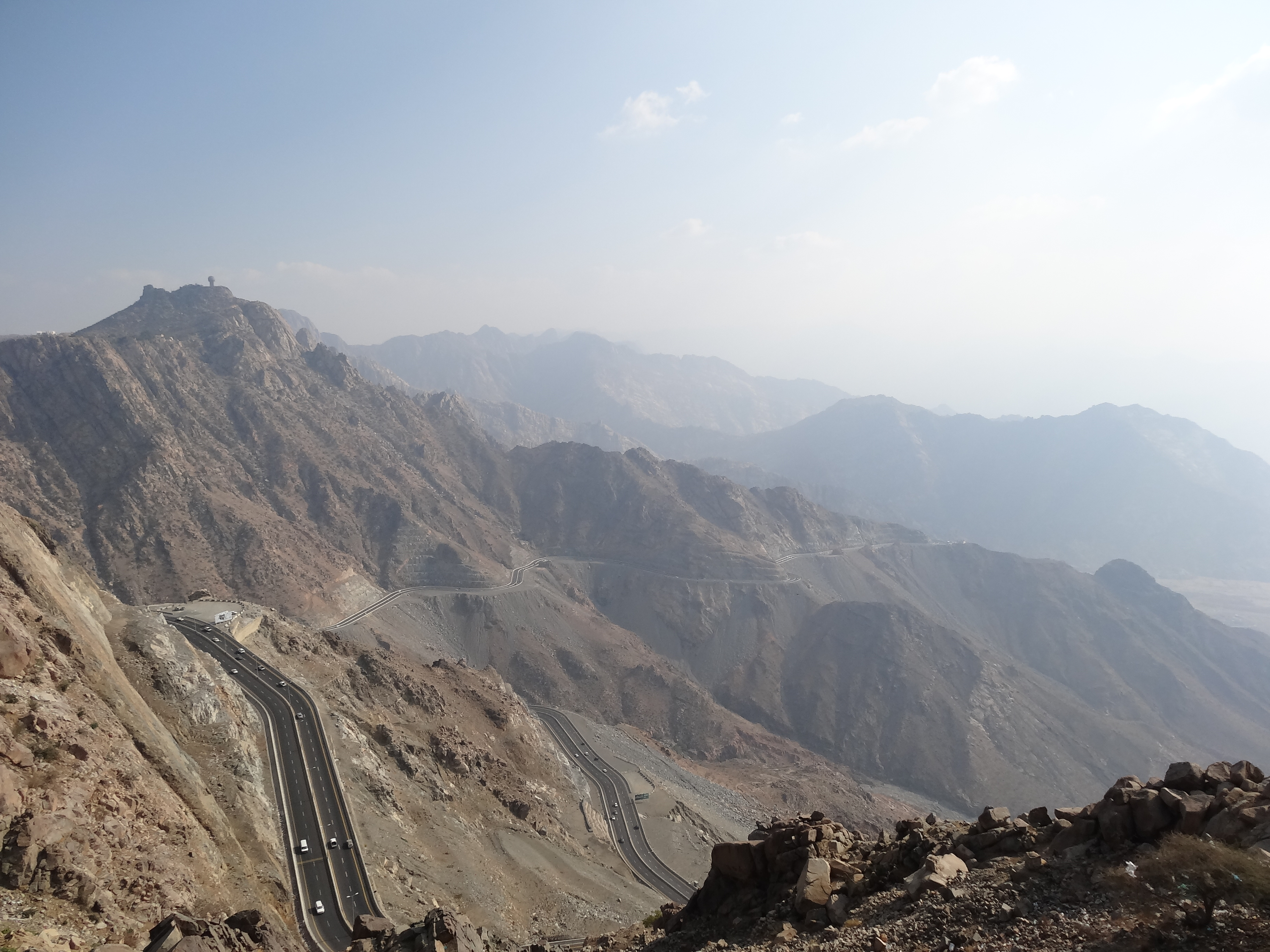
- A road in the mountains from Mecca to Ta'if

Highest point
- Peak: Jabal Werqaan
- Elevation: 2,393 m (7,851 ft)
- Coordinates: 23°0′N 41°0′E

Naming
- Native name: جِبَال ٱلْحِجَاز (Arabic)

Geography
- Location within Saudi Arabia Location within Middle East Location within West and Central Asia
- Country: Saudi Arabia
- Region(s): Hejaz, Arabian Peninsula

The Hijaz Mountains (Arabic: جِبَال ٱلْحِجَاز, romanized: Jibāl al-Ḥijāz, Hejazi Arabic pronunciation: [dʒɪˈbaːlu lħɪˈdʒaːzi]) or Hejaz Range is a mountain range located in the Hejazi region of western Saudi Arabia. The range runs north and south along the eastern coast of the Red Sea, and can thus be treated as including the Midian Mountains, and being part of the Sarawat Mountains, broadly speaking.

== Geography ==
The western coastal escarpment of the Arabian Peninsula is composed of two mountain ranges, the Hijaz Mountain to the north and the Asir Mountains farther south, with a gap between them near the middle of the peninsula's coastline. From an elevation of 2,100 metres (6,900 ft), the range declines towards the vicinity of the gap about 600 metres (2,000 ft).

The mountain wall drops abruptly on the western side toward the Red Sea, leaving the narrow coastal plain of Tihamah. The eastern slopes are not as steep, allowing rare rainfall to help create oases around the springs and wells of the few wadis.

=== River or wadi ===
The Hijaz Mountains have been conjectured as the source of the ancient Pishon River, that was described as one of the four rivers associated with the Garden of Eden. This is a component in the research of Juris Zarins that locates the Garden of Eden at the northern tip of the Persian Gulf near Kuwait. The course of the now dried up river, the modern-day Wadi al-Rummah and its extension Wadi al-Batin, was identified by Farouk El-Baz of Boston University and named the 'Kuwait River.' This tracks northeast across the Saudi desert for 600 miles (970 km), following Wadi al-Batin to the coast of the Persian Gulf. The 'Pishon' or 'Kuwait River,' and the Hejazi region's ecology, is estimated to have dried up 2,500–3000 years ago.

== Wildlife ==
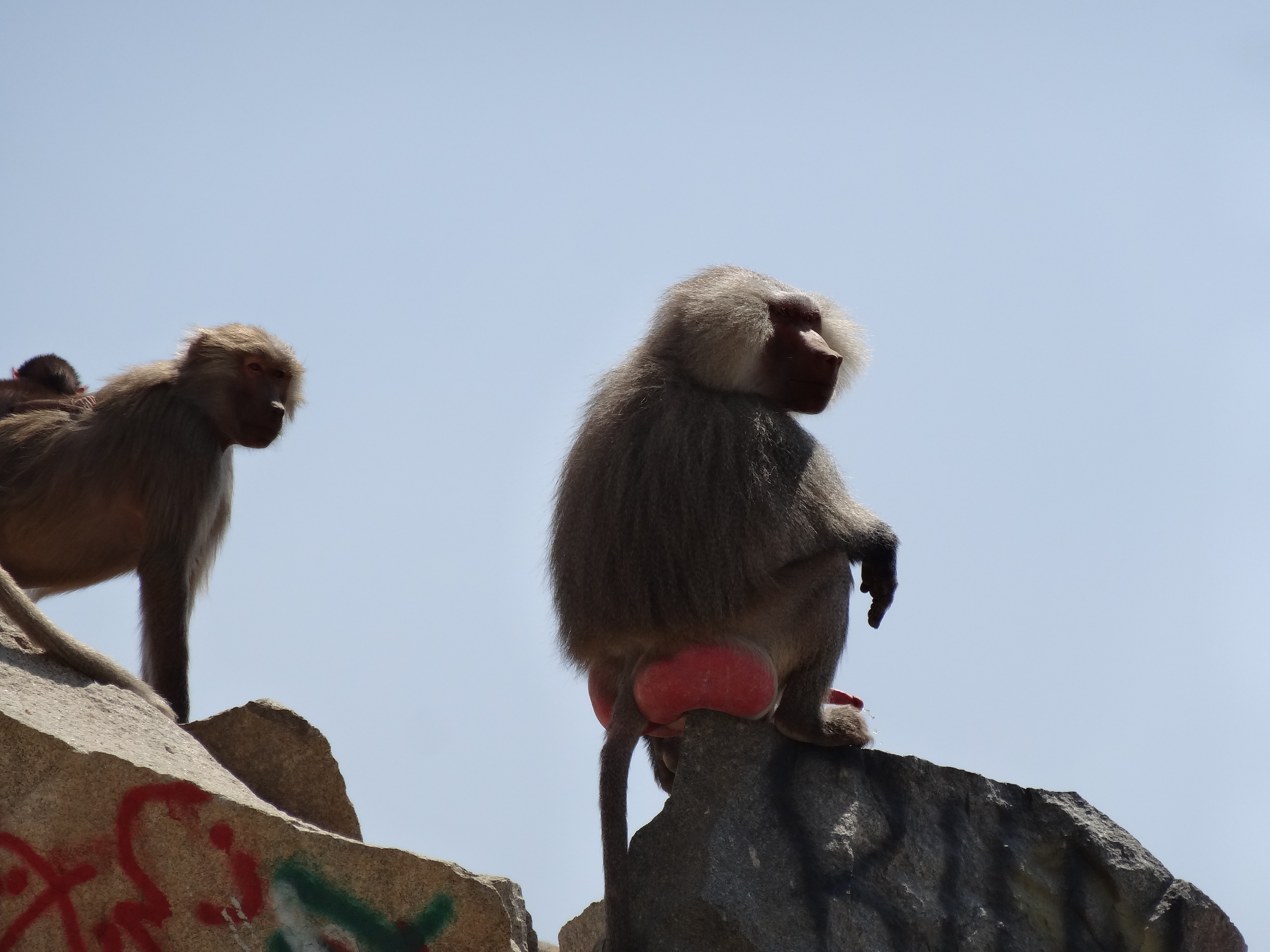
Hamadryas baboons near Al Hada in Makkah Province

The Arabian leopard had been sighted here. In ancient times, it was reported that Musa al-Kadhim, a descendant of Muhammad, encountered a lion in the wilderness north of Medina. Hamadryas baboons can be seen near settlements, like those of Al Hada and Al-Shafa near Ta'if.

== Mining ==
This region includes the district of Mahd adh-Dhahab ("Cradle of the Gold"), between Mecca and Medina. It is the principal gold-silver mine of Saudi Arabia but was only productive in c.a. 950 B.C. and 750-1258 A.D. and c.a. 1939-54.

== Gallery ==
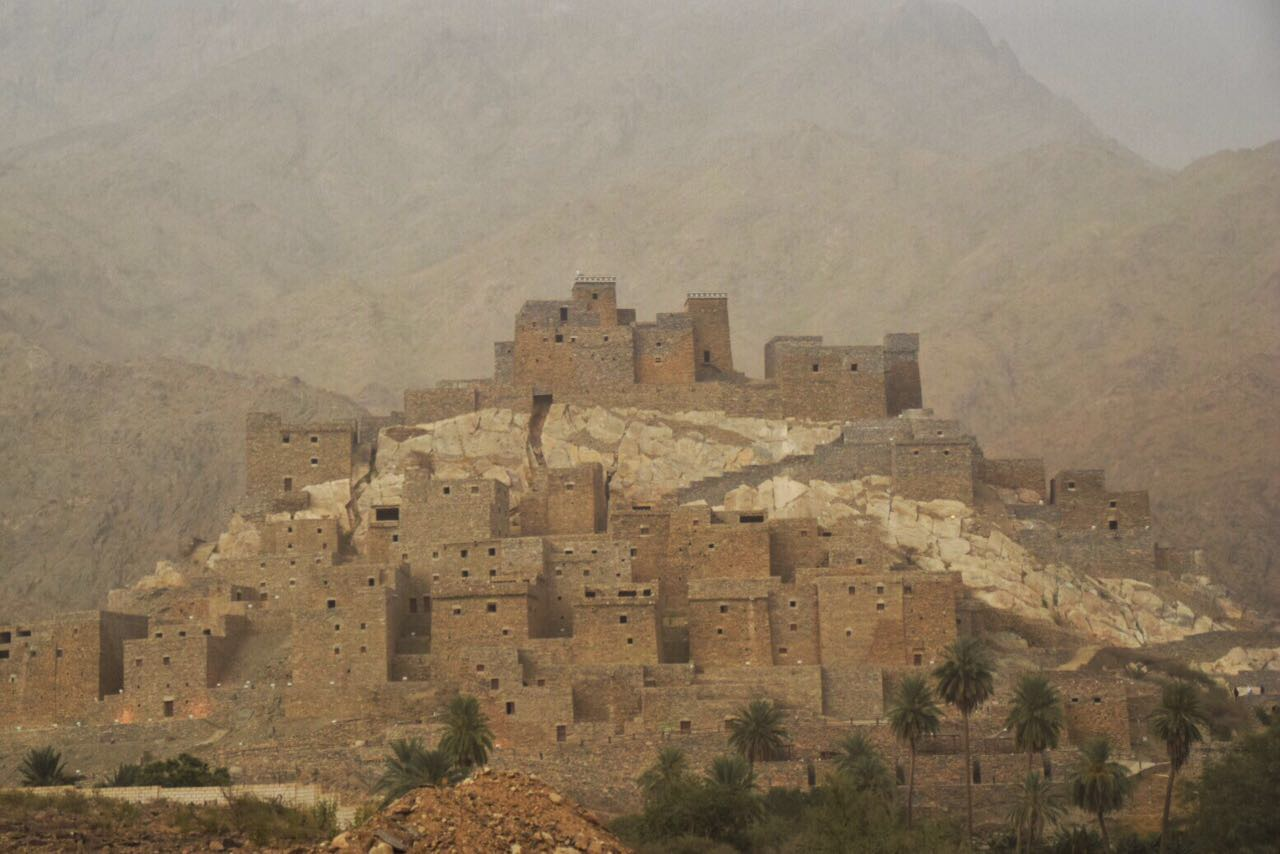
Dhu 'Ain in the area of Al-Bahah

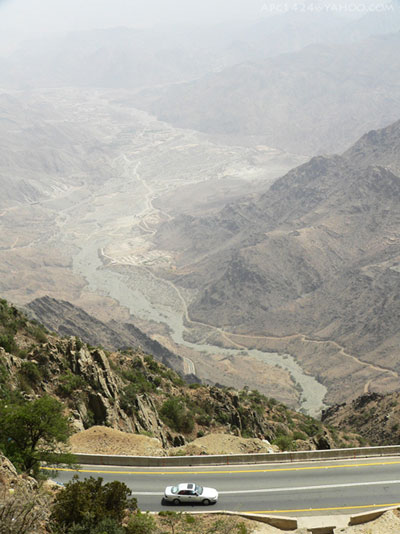
A road in the mountains between Al-Bahah and Al-Mikhwah

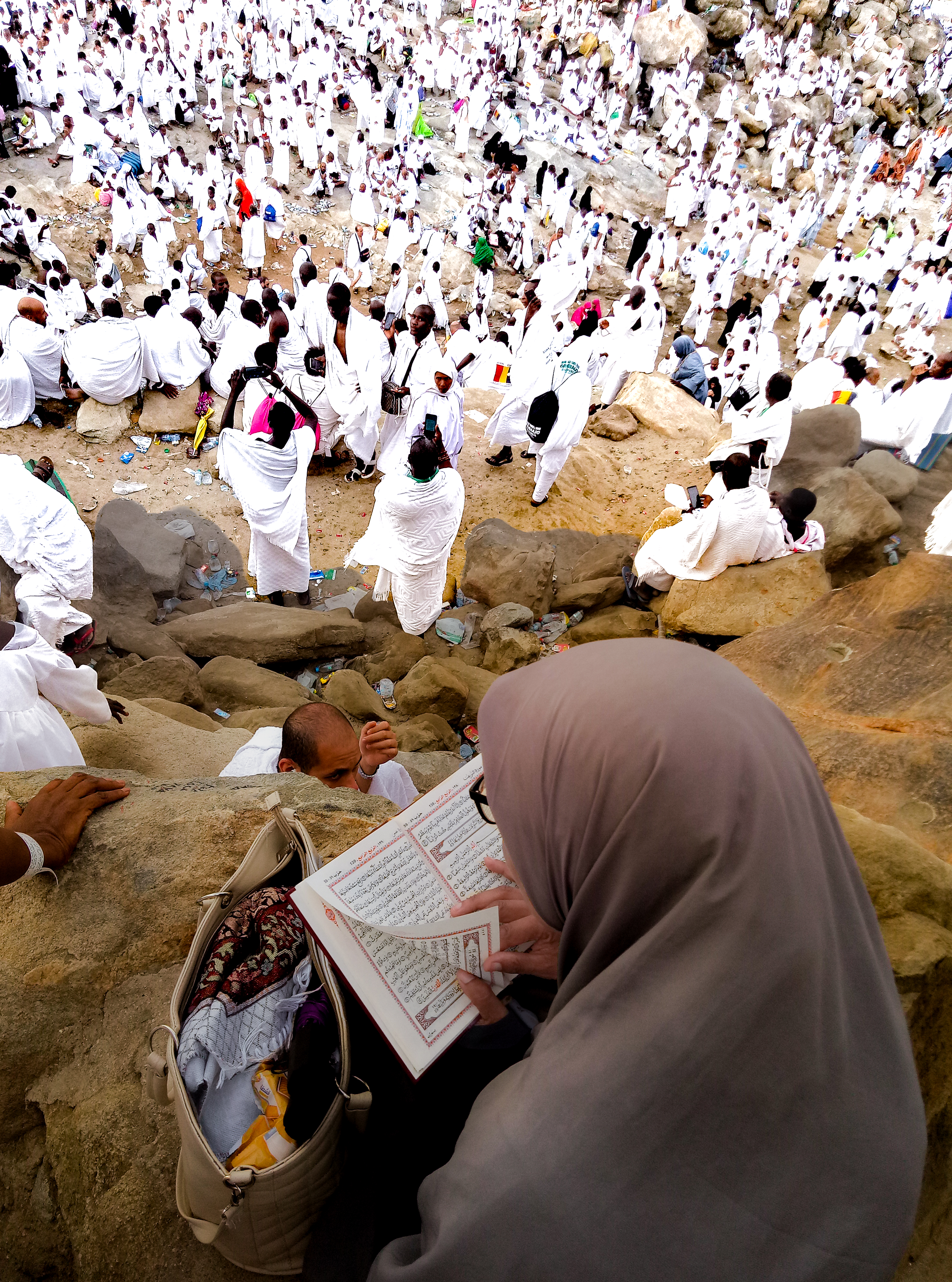
Pilgrims supplicating on the Mount of Mercy in Arafat during Ḥajj (the Greater Islamic Pilgrimage)

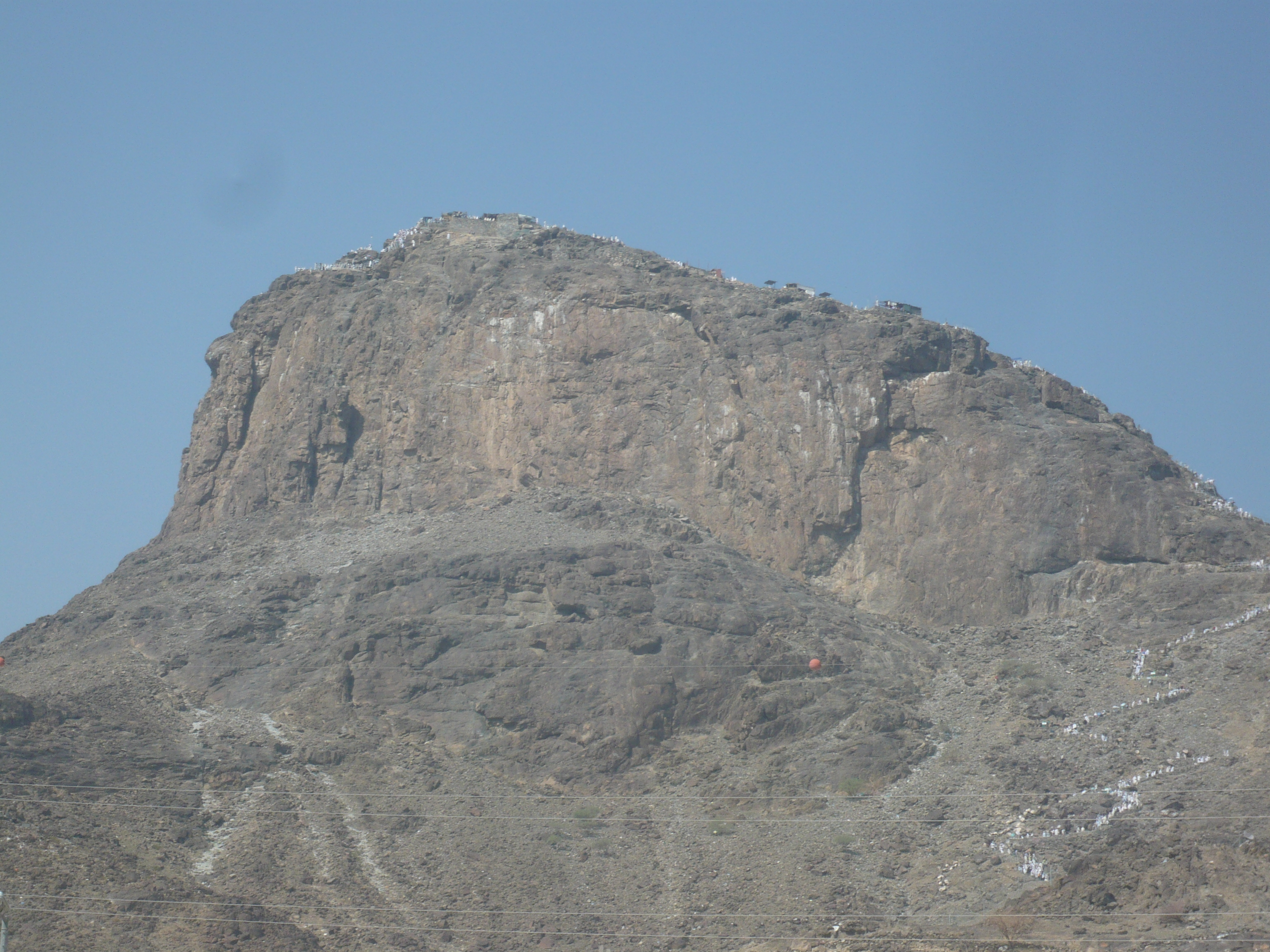
Jabal al-Nour ("Mount of Light") near Makkah, associated with Muhammad

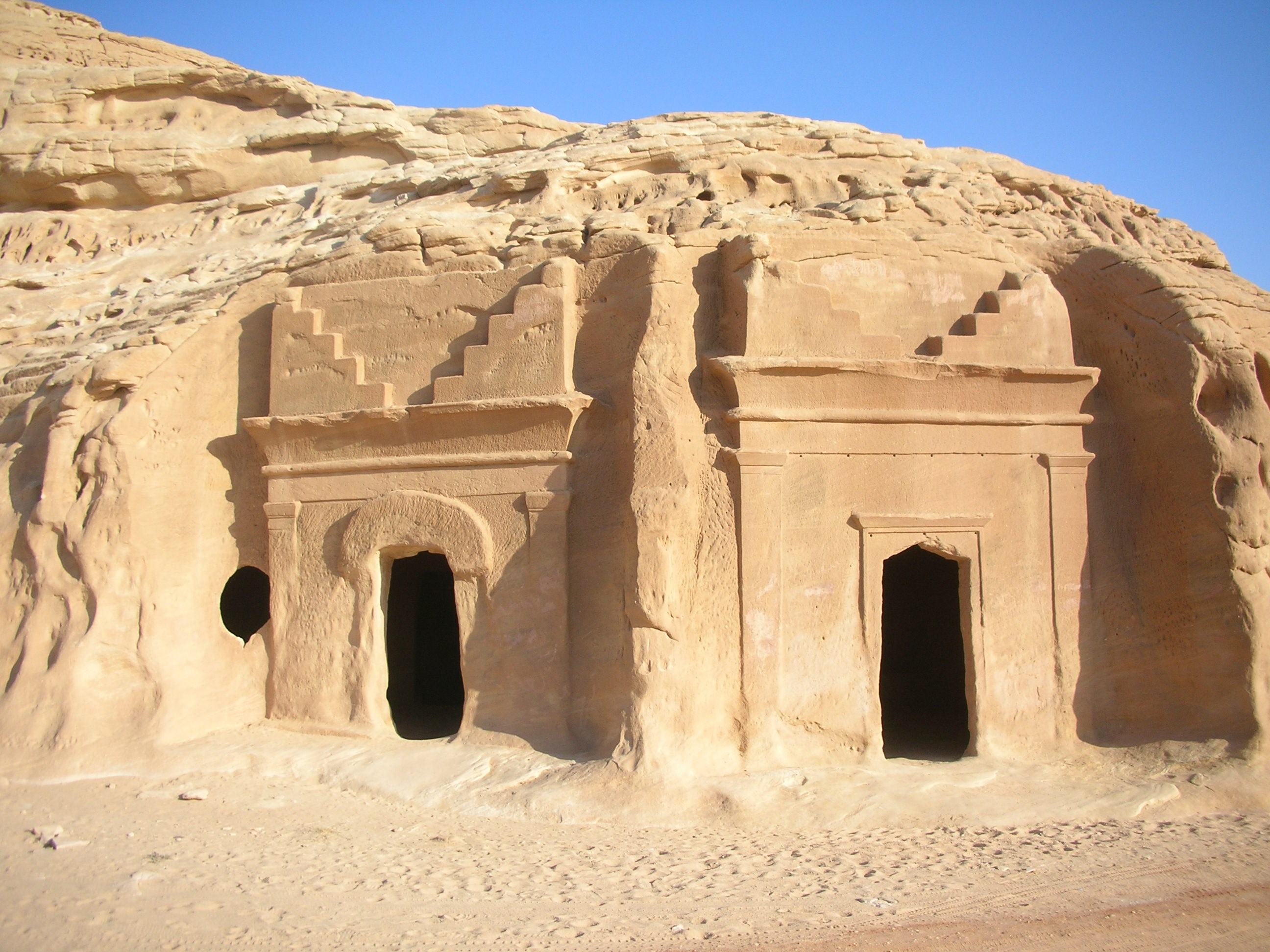
Structures carved into rock at Mada'in Saleh ("Cities of Saleh") near Al-'Ula

== See also ==
- Al Harrah, Saudi Arabia
- Biblical Mount Sinai
- Geology of Saudi Arabia
- List of mountains in Saudi Arabia
