= Ukraine's 1st electoral district =

Ukrainian electoral district

- Electoral district for the Verkhovna Rada
- Region: Autonomous Republic of Crimea
- Population: 162,256 (2012)

Current Electoral district
- Created: 2012
Party
Vacant

Ukraine's 1st electoral district is a Verkhovna Rada constituency in the Autonomous Republic of Crimea. Established in its current form in 2012, it is located entirely in the city of Simferopol. It includes the city's Central and Zaliznychnyi districts, covering the south-western half of the city. The constituency is home to 162,256 registered voters, and has 95 polling stations. Since the Annexation of Crimea by the Russian Federation in 2014, the seat has been vacant.

== People's Deputies ==
Party	Member	Portrait	Election
Party of Regions	Vitalina Dzoz		2012
Vacant			2014
Vacant			2019

== Elections ==
=== 2012 ===
2012 Ukrainian parliamentary election (single-member constituency)
Party	Candidate	Votes	%
Party of Regions	Vitalina Dzoz	27,937	38.8
Independent	Leonid Hrach	12,960	18.0
KPU	Oleh Solomahin	7,630	10.6
Russian Unity	Serhiy Aksenov	6,575	9.1
UDAR	Serhiy Dotsenko	4,838	6.7
Batkivshchyna	Serhiy Lobachev	4,485	6.2
Party of Greens	Larysa Semenova	1,646	2.3
Ukraine – Forward!	Volodymyr Tolkachov	1,119	1.6
Others		4,879	6.7
Total votes		72,069	100.0
Rejected ballots		3,493	4.6
Turnout		75,562	46.5
Registered electors		162,569	
Party of Regions win (new seat)			

2012 Ukrainian parliamentary election (Proportional Representation)
Party	Candidate	Votes	%

== See also ==
- Electoral districts of Ukraine
- Foreign electoral district of Ukraine
