= Simferopol =

Second-largest city on the Crimean Peninsula

Simferopol: Сімферополь (Ukrainian); Симферополь (Russian); Акъмесджит, Aqmescit (Crimean Tatar)
- City

Ukrainian transcription(s)
  - National: Simferopol
  - ALA-LC: Simferopol′
  - BGN/PCGN: Simferopol’
  - Scholarly: Simferopol′
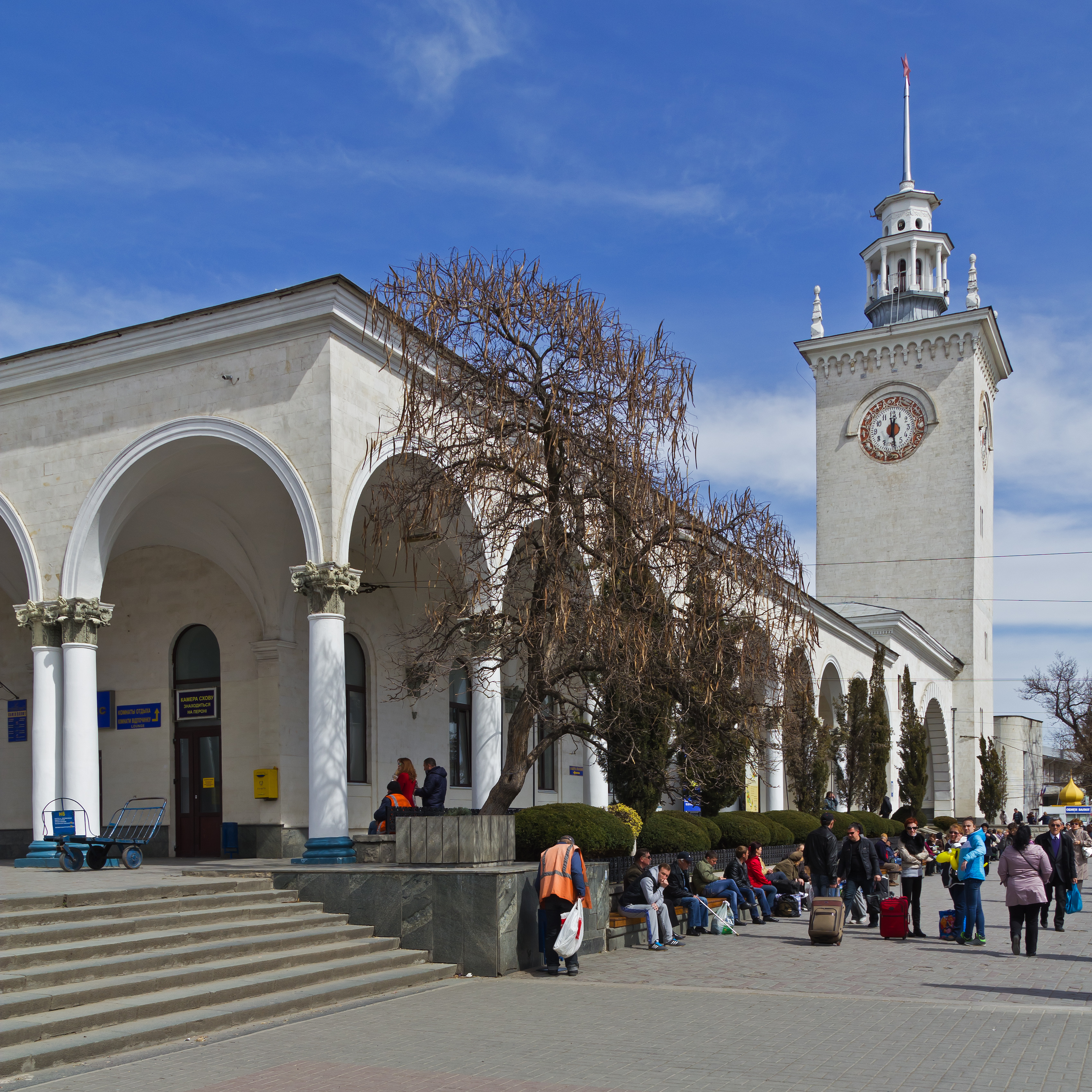
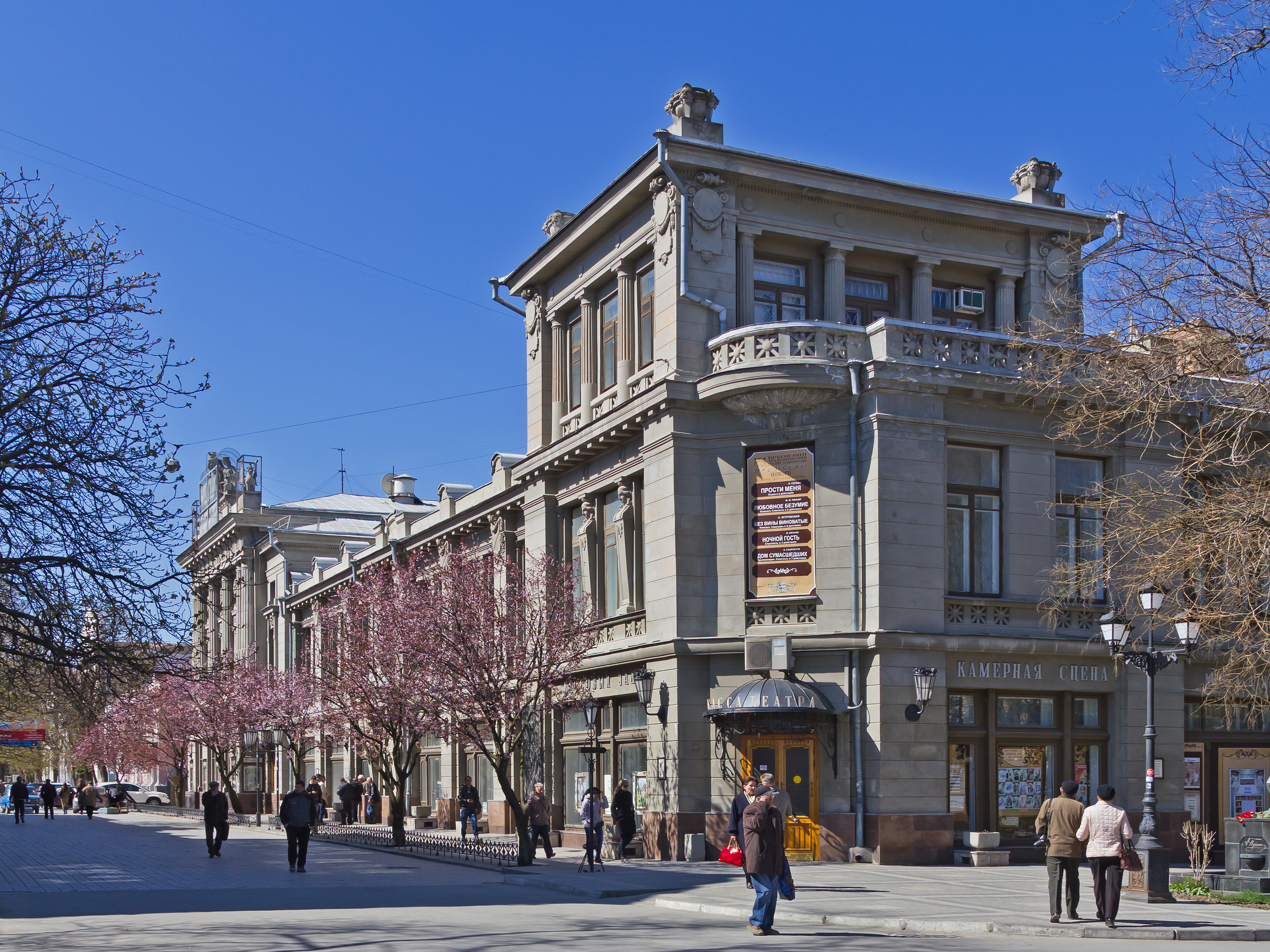
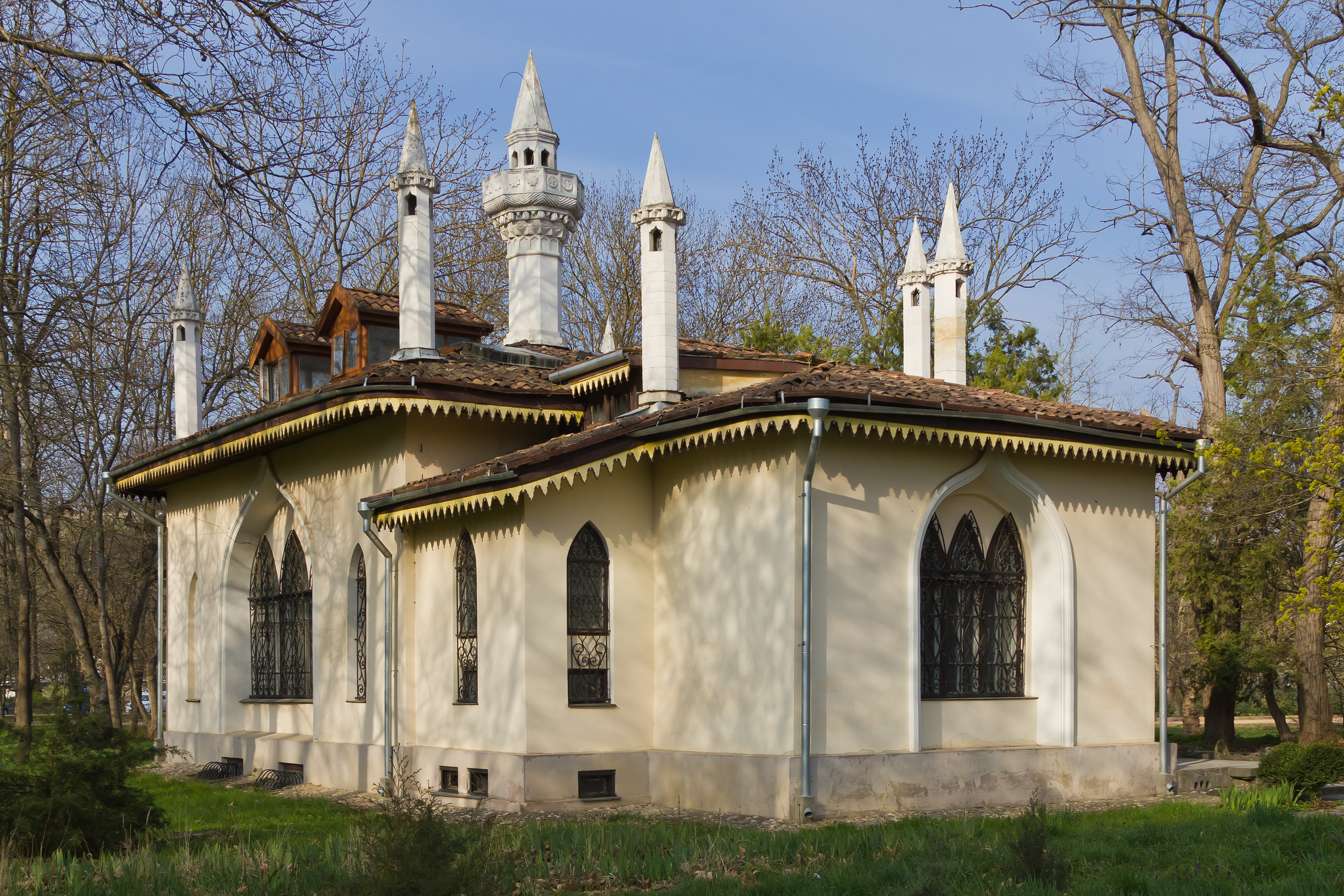
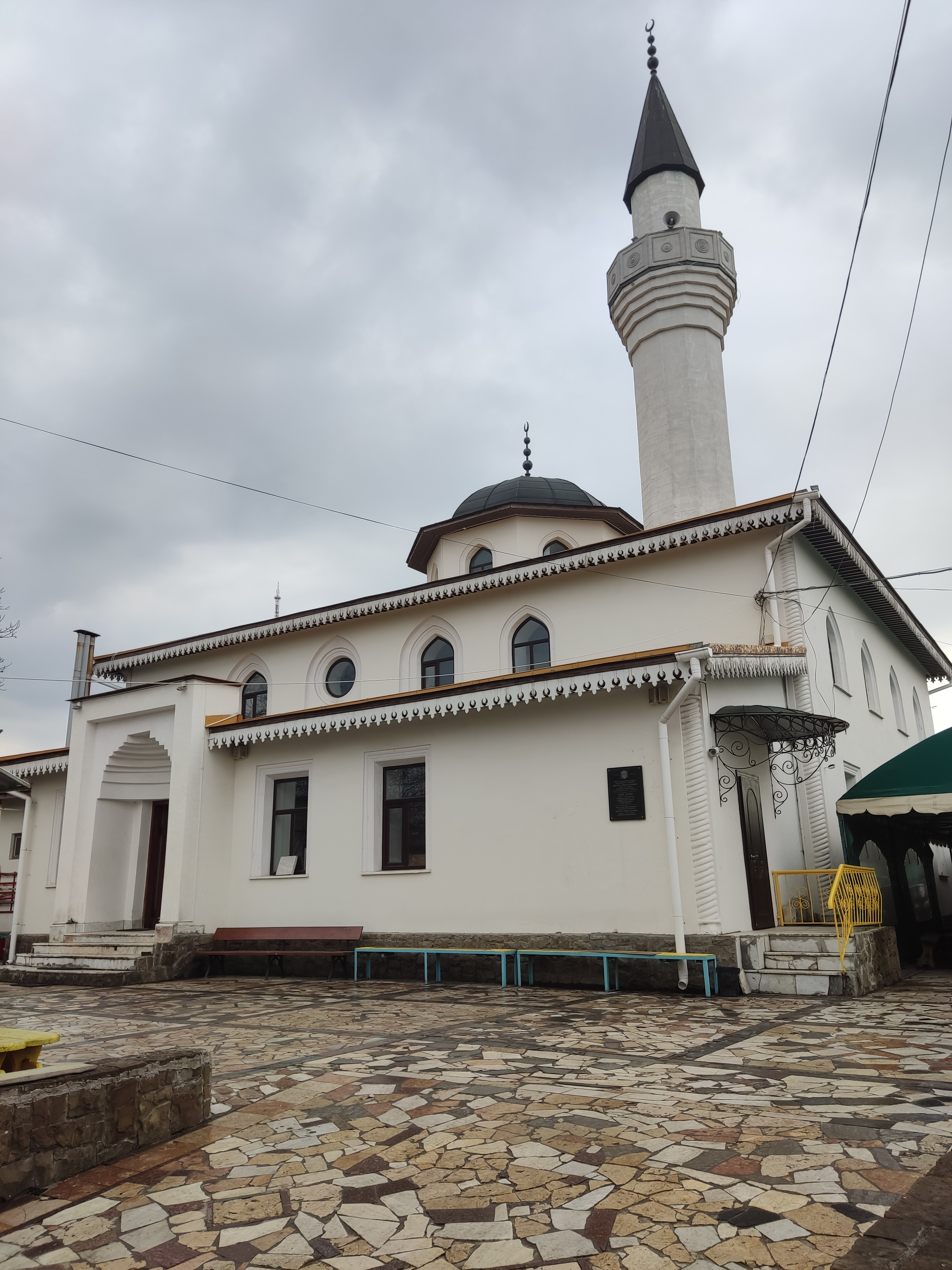
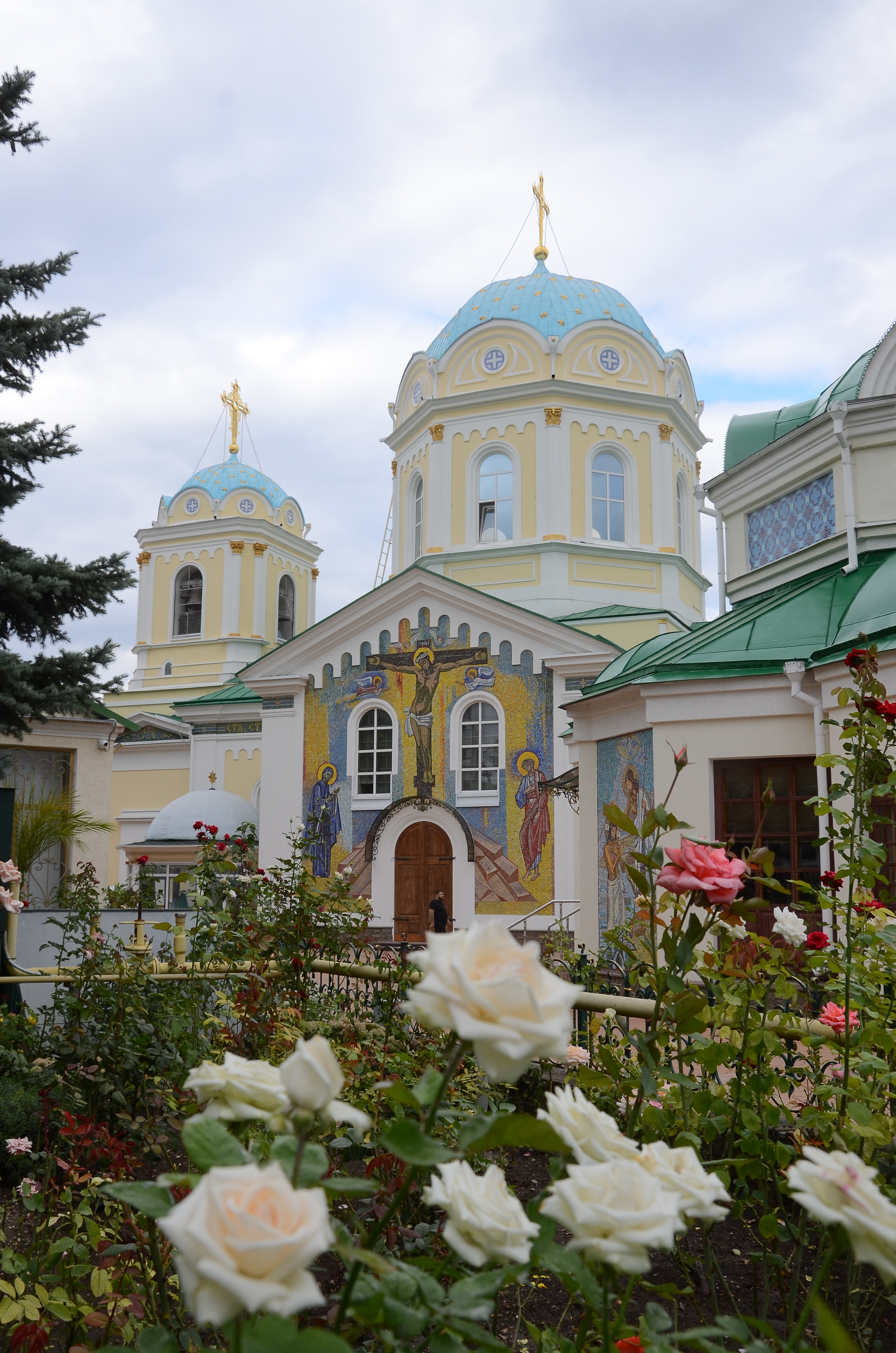
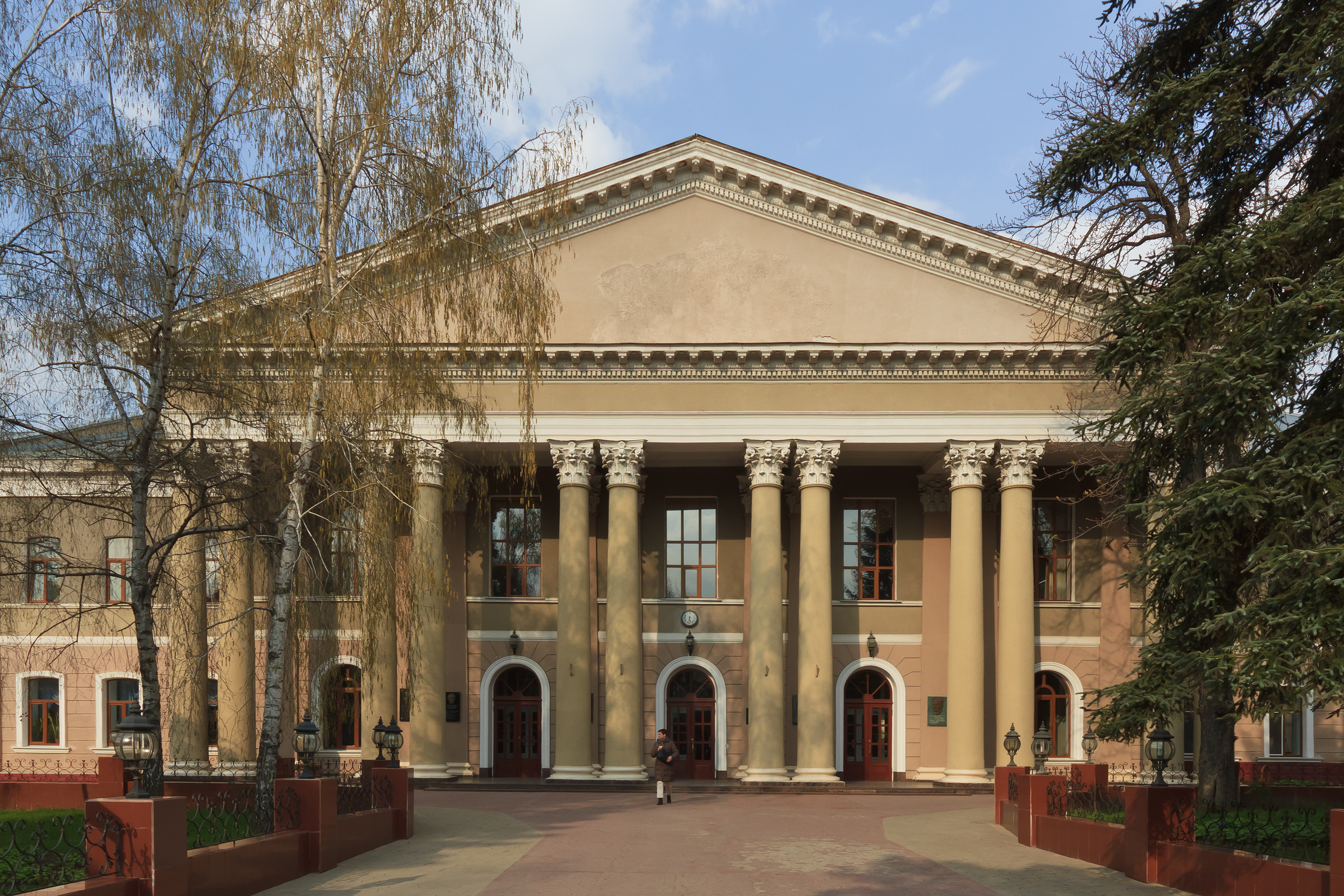
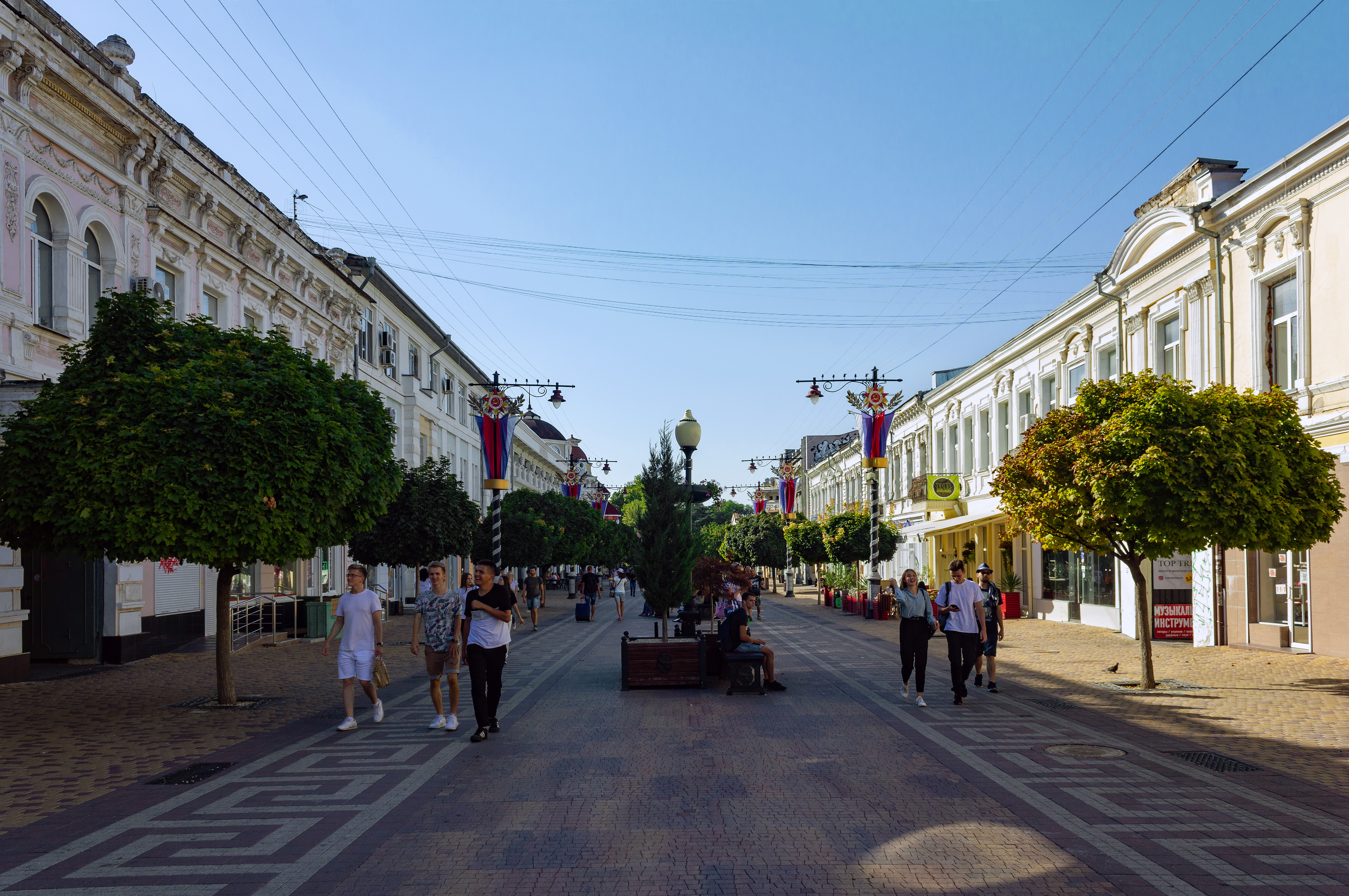
- Simferopol railway station Academic Drama Theater Salgirka Park Kebir-Jami Trinity Cathedral State Medical University Karl Marx Street

- Flag Coat of arms
- Nickname: Город пользы (in Russian); The City of Usefulness (translation)
- Interactive map of Simferopol
- Location within Ukraine Location within Crimea
- Coordinates: 44°57′N 34°6′E
- Country: Ukraine (de jure); Russia (de facto)
- Autonomous republic: Crimea (de jure)
- Raion: Simferopol Raion (de jure)
- Republic: Crimea (de facto)
- Municipality: Simferopol Municipality (de facto)
- Founded^{2}: 15th century
- Boroughs: Districts: Kyivskyi District; Tsentralnyi District; Zaliznychnyi District

Government (de facto)
  - Head: Mikhail Afanasev (de facto)

Area
  - Total: 107 km^{2} (41 sq mi)
- Elevation: 350 m (1,150 ft)

Population (2014)
  - Total: 332,317
  - Density: 3,183.17/km^{2} (8,244.4/sq mi)
- Demonym: Simferopolitan
- Time zone: UTC+3
- Postal code: 295000—295490
- Area code: +7 3652
- Licence plate: AK(UA) 82(RU)
- Sister cities: Heidelberg, Kecskemét, Salem, Bursa, Eskişehir, Ruse, Nizhny Novgorod
- Website: simgov.ru (Russian administration)
- ^{1} United Nations General Assembly Resolution 68/262^{2} Founded in 1784 as Simferopol, a Russian city. The settlement was previously known by the Crimean Tatar name Aqmescit.

Simferopol (/ˌsɪmfəˈroʊpəl/ SIM-fər-OH-pəl), also known as Aqmescit, (Note: See § Etymologies for other names) is the second-largest city on the Crimean Peninsula. The city, along with the rest of Crimea, is internationally recognized as part of Ukraine, but controlled by Russia. It is considered the capital of the Autonomous Republic of Crimea.

Since 2014 it has been under the de facto control of Russia, which annexed Crimea that year and regards Simferopol as the capital of the Republic of Crimea.

Simferopol is an important political, economic and transport hub of the peninsula, and serves as the administrative centre of both Simferopol Municipality and the surrounding Simferopol District. Its population was 332,317 (2014 Census).

After the 1784 annexation of the Crimean Khanate by the Russian Empire, the Russian empress decreed the foundation of a city named Simferopol on the location of the Crimean Tatar town of Aqmescit (lit. 'White Mosque').

== Etymologies ==
The name Simferopol (Ukrainian: Сімферо́поль [s⁽ʲ⁾imfeˈrɔpolʲ]; Russian: Симферо́поль [sʲɪmfʲɪˈropəlʲ]) comes from Sympheropoli (Greek: Συμφερόπολη, lit. 'city of common good'). The spelling Symferopil (Симферопіль) is also used.

In Crimean Tatar, the name of the city is Aqmescit (or in Cyrillic, Акъмесджит, lit. 'The white mosque', from Aq "white", and mescit "mosque"). But aq does not refer to the colour of the mosque, but rather to its location in cosmology. The Turkic peoples give a colour designation to the cardinal points, and white is the west. Thus, the exact translation of the name of the town is "the Western Mosque."

In English, the name was often given as Akmechet or Ak-Mechet (e.g. in the 1911 Encyclopædia Britannica). This was a transliteration from the Russian spelling of Crimean Tatar word Акмечет, Ак-Мечеть, where mechet' (мечеть) is the Russian word for "mosque".

== History ==
=== Early history ===
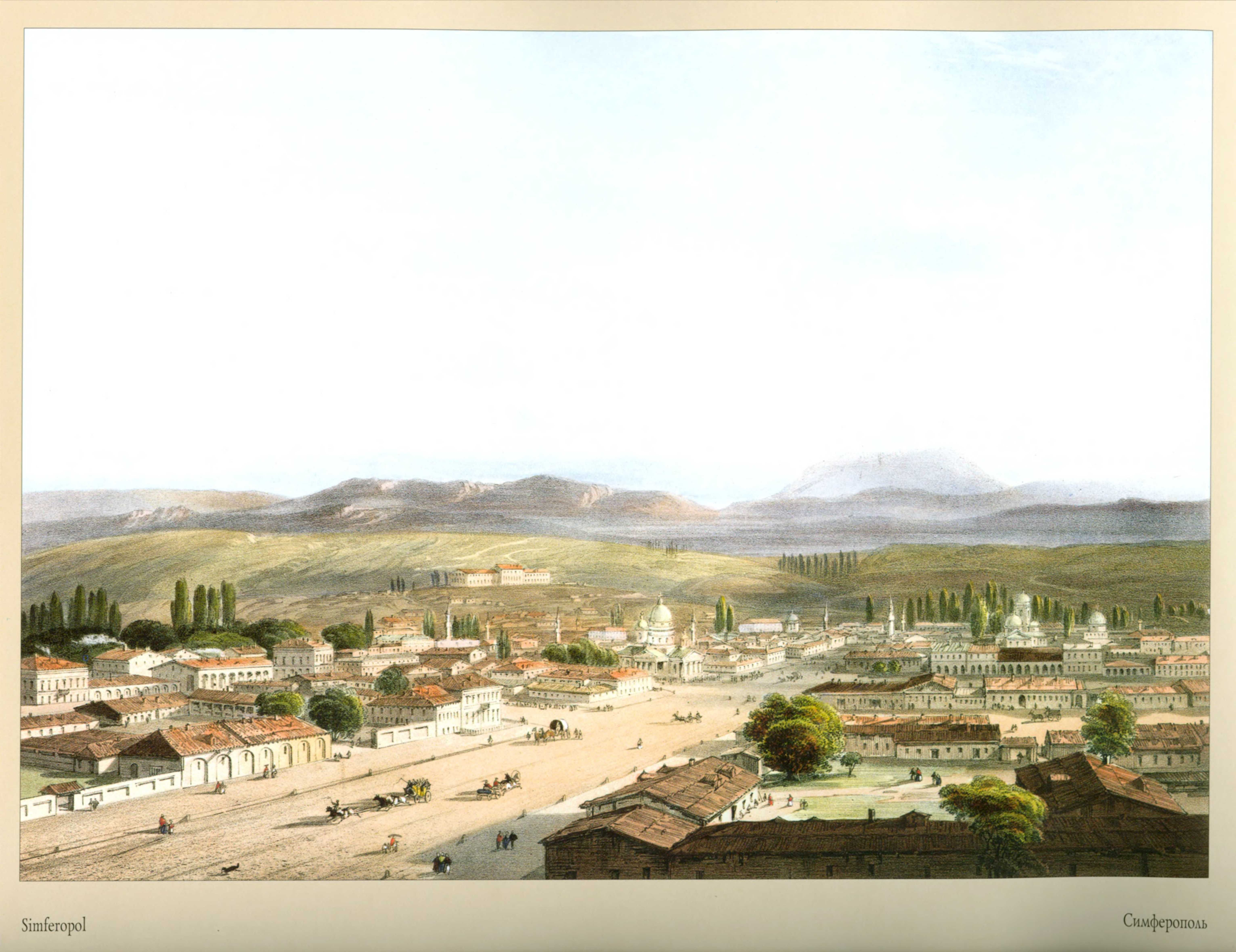
The city in 1856, by Carlo Bossoli.

Archaeological evidence in the Chokurcha cave shows the presence of ancient people living in the territory of modern Simferopol. The Scythian Neapolis, known by its Greek name, is also located in the city, which is the remnants of an ancient capital of the Crimean Scythians who lived in the territory from the 3rd century BC to the 4th century AD.

Later, the Crimean Tatars founded the town of Aqmescit. For some time, Aqmescit was the residence of the Qalğa-Sultan, the second most important position in the Crimean Khanate after the Khan himself. The area of the city once known as Aqmescit is today called Old Simferopol.

=== Russian Empire ===
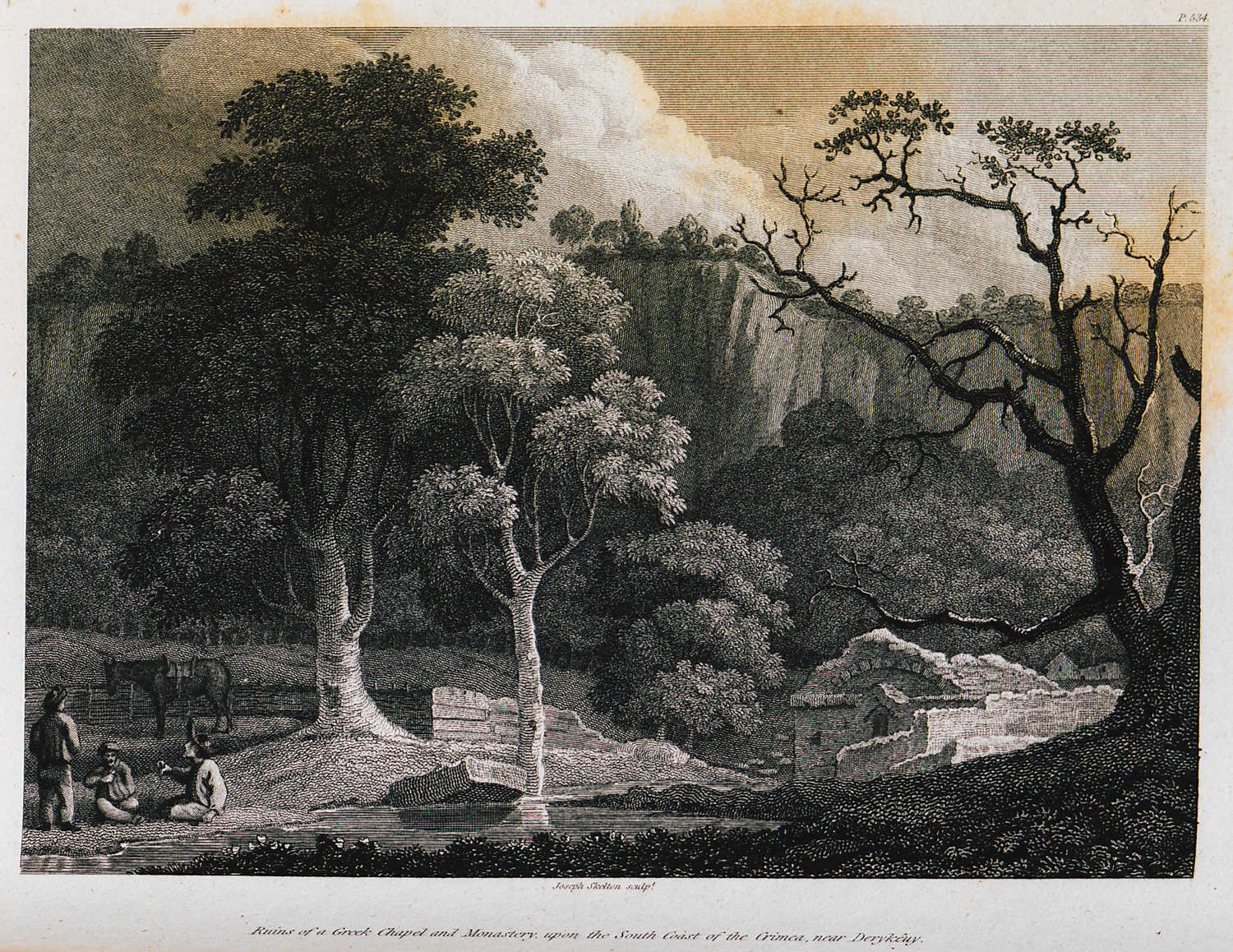
Ruins of Greek chapel near Simferopol and Chatyr-Dag, pictured in 1810

In 1784 modern Simferopol was founded after the annexation of the Crimean Khanate to the Russian Empire by Catherine II of Russia. The name Simferopol is in Greek, Συμφερόπολις (Simferopolis) and literally means "the city of usefulness." The tradition of Greek place names in newly acquired southern territories began with the Greek Plan of Russian Empress Catherine the Great. In 1802, Simferopol became the administrative centre of the Taurida Governorate. During the Crimean War of 1854–1856, the Russian Imperial Army reserves and a hospital were stationed in the city. After the war, more than 30,000 Russian soldiers were buried in the city's vicinity.

In 1866, the city had 1,522 artisans, particularly shoemakers, tailors, blacksmiths and carpenters, and 19 industrial plants, including 11 soap and candle factories and five tobacco factories. As of 1870, 56.9% of the population adhered to Eastern Orthodoxy, 23.6% either to Judaism or Karaite Judaism, 11.2% to Islam, and 8.2% to other Christian denominations. In the late 19th century, the city had several Eastern Orthodox churches, a Roman Catholic church, an Armenian Catholic church, an Armenian Orthodox church, a Lutheran church, a synagogue and a mosque. The local Catholic parish was about 70% Polish.

=== 20th-century wars ===
In the 20th century, Simferopol was once again affected by wars and conflicts in the region. At the end of the Russian Civil War, the headquarters of General Pyotr Wrangel, leader of the anti-Bolshevik White Army, were located there. On 13 November 1920, the Red Army captured the city and on 18 October 1921, Simferopol became the capital of the Crimean Autonomous Soviet Socialist Republic.

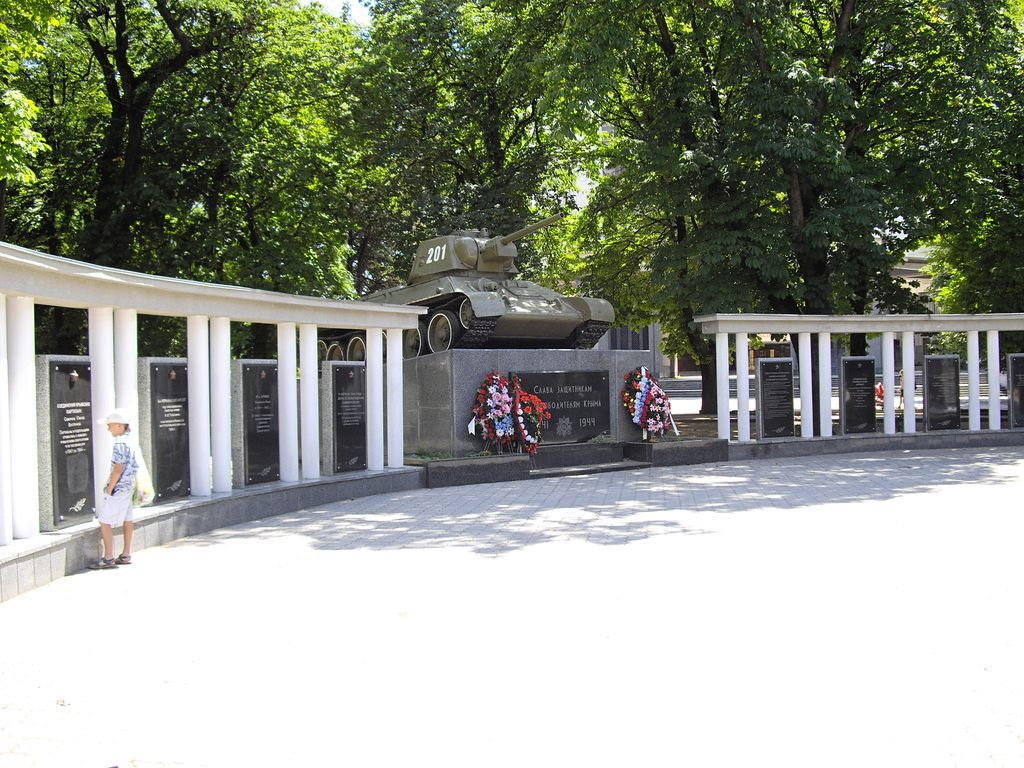
OT-34, monument of World War II

During World War II, Simferopol was occupied by Nazi Germany from 1 November 1941 to 13 April 1944. Retreating NKVD police shot a number of prisoners on 31 October 1941 in the NKVD building and the city's prison. Germans perpetrated one of the largest war-time massacres in Simferopol, killing in total over 22,000 locals—mostly Jews, Russians, Krymchaks, and Romani. On one occasion, starting 9 December 1941, the Einsatzkommando 11b, which was under the command of Werner Braune, whose main unit and superior were Einsatzgruppe D and Otto Ohlendorf, respectively, command killed an estimated 14,300 Simferopol residents, mostly Jewish. The German Army operated the Dulag 241 transit prisoner-of-war camp, eventually replaced by the Stalag 370 POW camp. The camps were overcrowded and lacked proper medical care, and the POWs were malnourished, abused and subjected to forced labour in the area.

In April 1944 the Red Army liberated Simferopol. On 18 May 1944 the Crimean Tatar population of the city, along with the whole Crimean Tatar nation of Crimea, was forcibly deported to Central Asia as collective punishment for the perceived collaboration of Tatars with Nazi Germany.

=== Ukraine ===
On 26 April 1954, Simferopol, together with the rest of the Crimean Oblast, was transferred from the Russian Soviet Federative Socialist Republic to the Ukrainian Soviet Socialist Republic by Soviet Premier Nikita Khrushchev.

An asteroid, discovered in 1970 by Soviet astronomer Tamara Mikhailovna Smirnova, is named after the city (2141 Simferopol).

Following a referendum on 20 January 1991, the Crimean Oblast was upgraded to an Autonomous Soviet Socialist Republic on 12 February 1991 by the Supreme Soviet of the Ukrainian SSR. Simferopol became the capital of the Crimean Autonomous Soviet Socialist Republic.

After the collapse of the Soviet Union in 1991, Simferopol became the capital of the Autonomous Republic of Crimea within newly independent Ukraine. Today, the city has a population of 340,600 (2006) most of whom are ethnic Russians, with the rest being Ukrainian and Crimean Tatar minorities.

After the Crimean Tatars were allowed to return from exile in the 1990s, several new Crimean Tatar suburbs were constructed, as many more Tatars returned to the city compared to number exiled in 1944. Land ownership between the current residents and returning Crimean Tatars is a major area of conflict today with the Tatars requesting the return of lands seized after their deportation.

=== Russian annexation ===
After Russia occupied and formally annexed Crimea on 18 March 2014, Simferopol was named the capital of a new federal subject of the Russian Federation encompassing the majority of the peninsula by decree of Russian president Vladimir Putin, with the exception of Sevastopol, which became a federal сity.

Prior to the seizure of the city by Russia, a mass protest was organised by the city's Crimean Tatars in support of Crimea remaining as part of Ukraine.

== Geography ==
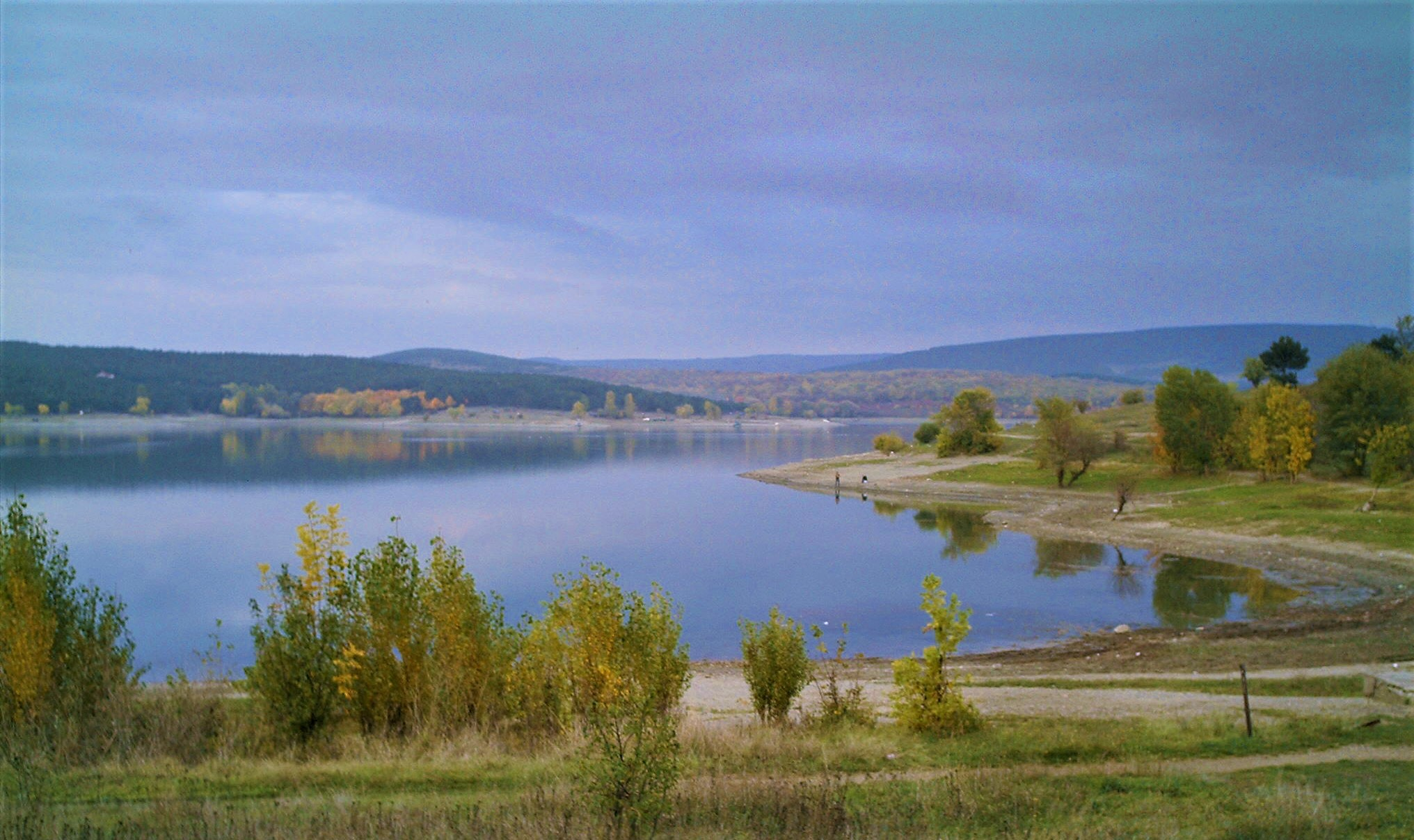
The Simferopol Reservoir provides clean drinking water to the city.

=== Location ===
Simferopol is located in the south-central Crimean Peninsula. The city lies on the Salhir River near the artificial Simferopol Reservoir, which provides the city with clean drinking water. The Simferopol Reservoir's earth dam is the biggest in Europe.

=== Climate ===
The city experiences a humid subtropical climate (Köppen: Cfa), near the boundary of the humid continental climate (Köppen: Dfa). The average temperature in January is 0.4 °C (32.7 °F) and 23 °C (73 °F) in July. The average rainfall is 501 millimetres (19.7 in) per year, and there is a total of 2,529 hours of sunshine per year.

Climate data for Simferopol (1991–2020, extremes 1886–present)
Month	Jan	Feb	Mar	Apr	May	Jun	Jul	Aug	Sep	Oct	Nov	Dec	Year
Record high °C (°F)	20.8 (69.4)	21.9 (71.4)	28.7 (83.7)	31.5 (88.7)	34.2 (93.6)	37.7 (99.9)	39.3 (102.7)	39.5 (103.1)	37.2 (99.0)	33.3 (91.9)	28.0 (82.4)	25.4 (77.7)	39.5 (103.1)
Mean daily maximum °C (°F)	4.1 (39.4)	5.5 (41.9)	10.2 (50.4)	16.3 (61.3)	21.9 (71.4)	26.5 (79.7)	29.8 (85.6)	29.7 (85.5)	24.0 (75.2)	17.5 (63.5)	11.1 (52.0)	6.1 (43.0)	16.9 (62.4)
Daily mean °C (°F)	0.4 (32.7)	1.1 (34.0)	4.8 (40.6)	10.2 (50.4)	15.6 (60.1)	20.2 (68.4)	23.0 (73.4)	22.8 (73.0)	17.6 (63.7)	11.8 (53.2)	6.4 (43.5)	2.4 (36.3)	11.4 (52.5)
Mean daily minimum °C (°F)	−2.9 (26.8)	−2.6 (27.3)	0.4 (32.7)	4.8 (40.6)	9.9 (49.8)	14.5 (58.1)	17.0 (62.6)	16.6 (61.9)	12.1 (53.8)	7.2 (45.0)	2.7 (36.9)	−0.8 (30.6)	6.6 (43.9)
Record low °C (°F)	−26.0 (−14.8)	−30.3 (−22.5)	−18.4 (−1.1)	−11.1 (12.0)	−8.4 (16.9)	0.7 (33.3)	3.6 (38.5)	3.8 (38.8)	−5.1 (22.8)	−11.4 (11.5)	−21.7 (−7.1)	−23.2 (−9.8)	−30.3 (−22.5)
Average precipitation mm (inches)	42 (1.7)	34 (1.3)	36 (1.4)	33 (1.3)	40 (1.6)	58 (2.3)	39 (1.5)	47 (1.9)	40 (1.6)	45 (1.8)	44 (1.7)	43 (1.7)	501 (19.7)
Average extreme snow depth cm (inches)	1 (0.4)	2 (0.8)	1 (0.4)	0 (0)	0 (0)	0 (0)	0 (0)	0 (0)	0 (0)	0 (0)	0 (0)	1 (0.4)	2 (0.8)
Average rainy days	12	11	11	11	10	11	8	7	10	11	13	14	129
Average snowy days	11	11	7	1	0	0	0	0	0	1	4	9	44
Average relative humidity (%)	85.0	80.5	75.0	69.0	69.3	67.3	62.6	62.3	69.2	75.8	81.2	84.2	73.5
Mean monthly sunshine hours	80.7	109.9	160.2	227.6	299.2	321.3	358.5	332.6	259.1	190.2	115.2	74.1	2,528.6
Source 1: Pogoda.ru.net
Source 2: NOAA (humidity and sun 1991–2020)

== Politics and administrative divisions ==
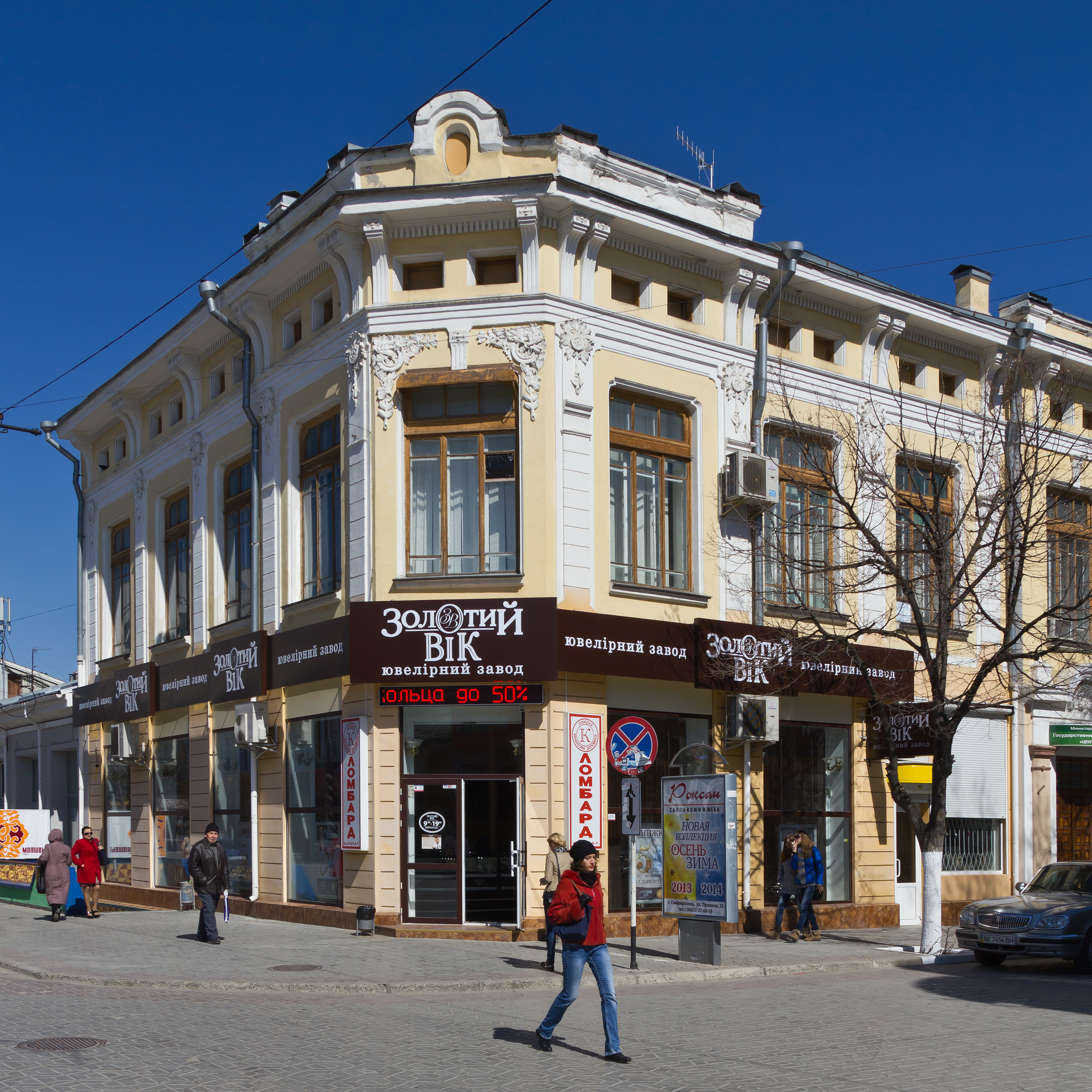
Simferopol's city centre

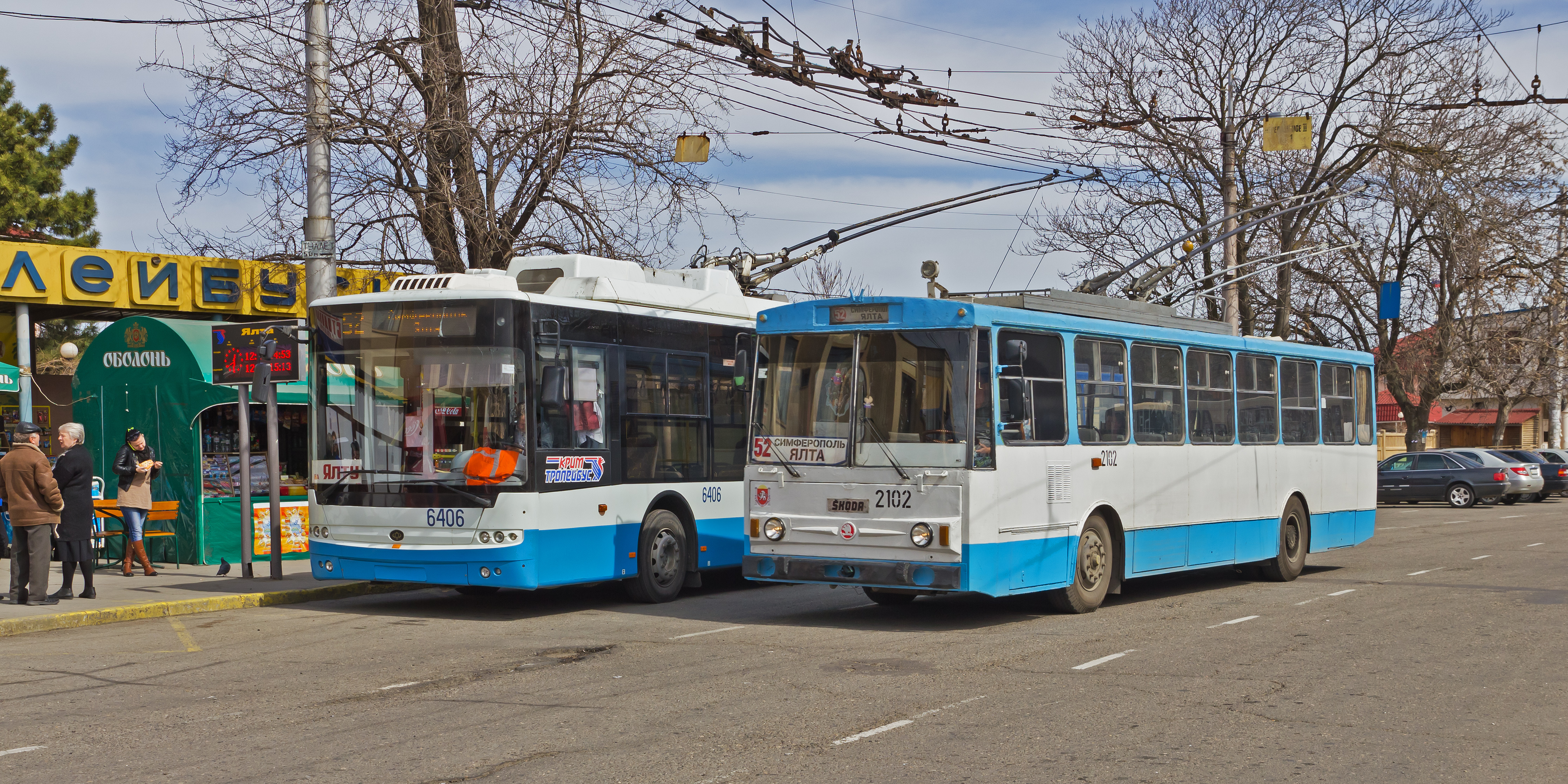
The Crimean Trolleybus runs from Simferopol to Yalta.

As the capital of Crimea, Simferopol houses its political structure including the Supreme Council of Crimea and the Council of Ministers. Simferopol is also the administrative centre of the Simferopol Raion (district), but is directly subordinate to the Crimean authorities rather than to the district authorities housed in the city itself.

The city of Simferopol is administratively divided into three urban districts (Zaliznychnyi, Kyivskyi and Tsentralnyi), four urban-type settlements (Ahrarne, Aeroflotskyi, Hresivskyi, Komsomolske) and the village of Bitumne.

Viktor Ageev became city mayor on 11 November 2010 and was then elected chairman of the Simferopol City Council on 29 September 2014.

Igor Lukashyov was installed as the head of Simferopol City administration (i.e. local executive) after Russia annexed the region in 2014. He served in this position until his dismissal on 9 November 2018.

== Transportation ==
Simferopol has a major railway station, which serves millions of tourists each year. In December 2014 Ukraine cut the railway line to Crimea at the border with mainland Ukraine (Kherson Oblast). Currently, the station serves only a commuter (regional) passenger train and the Moscow – Simferopol train every day.

The city is also connected via the Simferopol International Airport, which was constructed in 1936. Zavodskoye Airport is situated southwest of Simferopol.

The city has several main bus stations, with routes towards many cities, including Sevastopol, Kerch, Yalta, and Yevpatoriya. The Crimean Trolleybus connects Simferopol to the city of Yalta on Crimean Black Sea coast. The line is the longest trolleybus line in the world with a total length of 86 kilometres (53 mi) (since 2014 again 96 kilometres (60 mi)).

The streets of Simferopol have a rare house numbering – the odd numbers are on the right side of the road, looking in the direction in which the numbers increase.

== Demographics ==
Historical population

Year	Pop.	±% p.a.
1866	16,557	—
1870	17,129	+0.85%
1897	49,078	+3.98%
1923	70,203	+1.39%
1926	86,145	+7.06%
1939	142,634	+3.96%
1959	187,632	+1.38%
1970	301,505	+4.41%
1979	301,505	+0.00%

Year	Pop.	±% p.a.
1989	343,565	+1.31%
1992	374,000	+2.87%
1998	341,000	−1.53%
2001	343,644	+0.26%
2003	343,536	−0.02%
2004	342,523	−0.29%
2005	341,599	−0.27%
2006	340,644	−0.28%
2007	339,577	−0.31%

Year	Pop.	±% p.a.
2008	337,830	−0.51%
2009	337,139	−0.20%
2010	336,588	−0.16%
2011	336,330	−0.08%
2012	335,582	−0.22%
2013	337,285	+0.51%
2014	338,319	+0.31%

At the last census in 2014, the population of Simferopol was 338,319, the highest of any city in the Republic of Crimea and second only to Sevastopol within the Crimean peninsula.

== Economy ==
When it existed, Crimea Air had its head office on the grounds of Simferopol Airport. A new 19-gate terminal for the airport finished construction in 2018. The terminal was designed in the shape of a wave by Samoo Architects & Engineers, after their successful bid as part of an international competition.

=== Industry ===
Simferopol is home to a number of industrial plants, including the following:

- Fiolent (two locations), producer of power tools and other electrical systems
- Simferopol chemical industry plants
- PO Foton
- SEM SElktroMash SELMZ
- Plastotekhnika and else plastics related
- Santekhprom SSTP
- PEK PromElektroKontakt and PromSchitKontakt, ChPO Sfera IzmertelnPribor, SELTZ ElectroTechnical Plant
- Pnevmatika, other pneumatics tires etc. related industry
- Monolit SMZKon, TsSI Tavrida SKMKZ, Slava Truda SCMNG, SiMZ Motor Plants
- Chornomornaftogaz
- Digital Valley (Tsifrovaya Dolina): silicon industry, computers, wafers and microelectronics, it, other related. It will located (most likely) near the airport for convenience.

== Education ==
The largest collection of higher education institutions in Crimea is located in Simferopol. Among them is the largest university in Simferopol and Crimea, the Taurida V.Vernadsky National University, which was founded in 1917. Crimea State Medical University named after S. I. Georgievsky, also located in Simferopol, is one of the most prominent medical schools of Ukraine. The Crimean Medical University is situated on the plot, where in 1855 a nursery garden was planted by the founder of the Nikita Botanical Gardens Ch.Ch.Steven (1781–1863). In 1863–66 a school for girls was built here and in 1931 a medical institute was opened. On the same plot P.Krzhizhanovsky built a three-storey hostel for medical students after the design in 1934. The building with clear geometric masses was completed in 1938. A new federal university campus was opened 4 August 2014.

== Sports ==
Simferopol is home to the football club FC TSK Simferopol which plays in the Crimean Premier League. It was formed as a Russian club in 2014, following the 2014 Crimean Conflict, to replace the Ukrainian club Tavriya Simferopol which had been the first winners of the Ukraine Premier League, and also won the Ukrainian Cup in 2010.

== Houses of worship ==
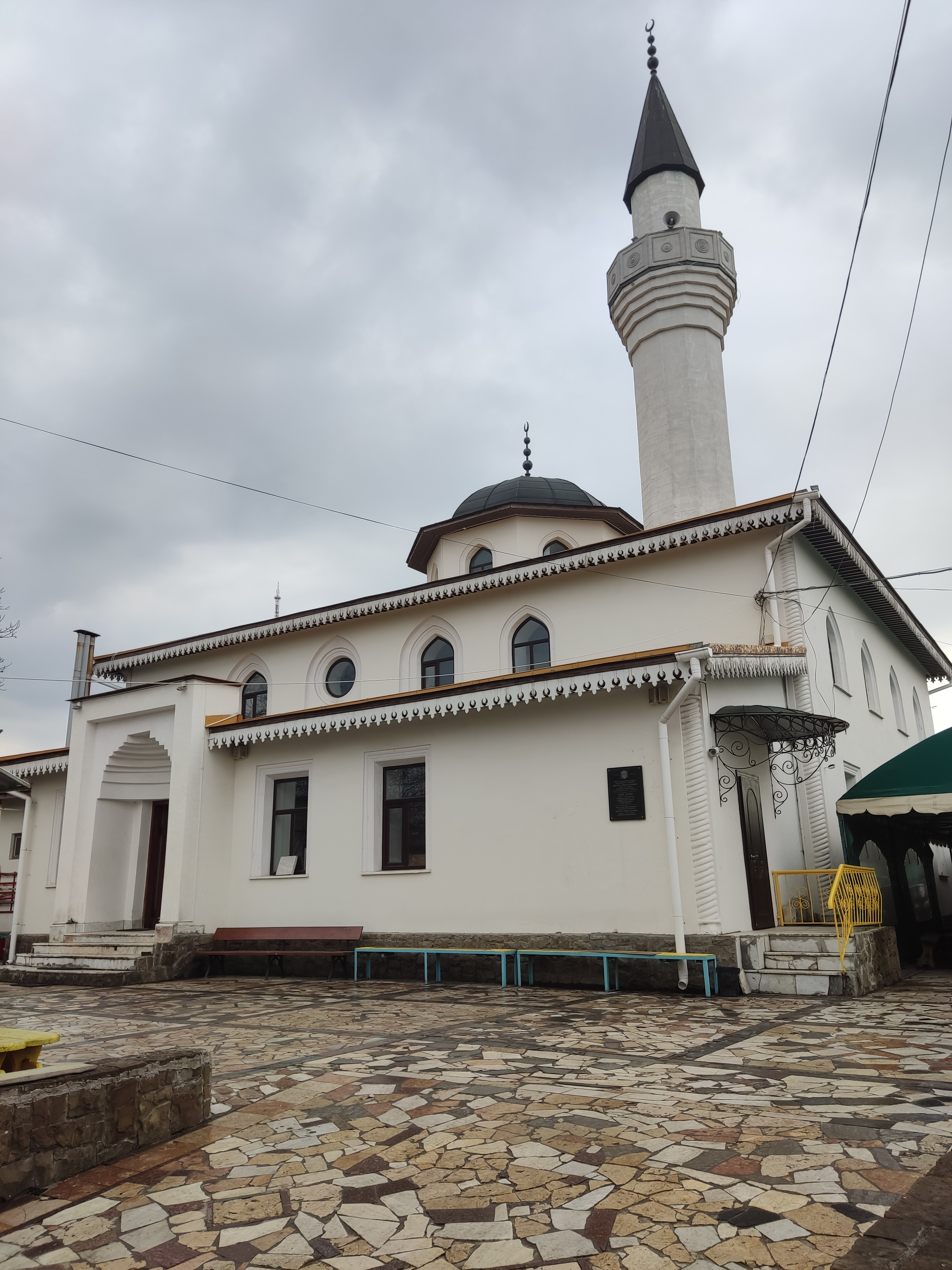
Kebir Mosque

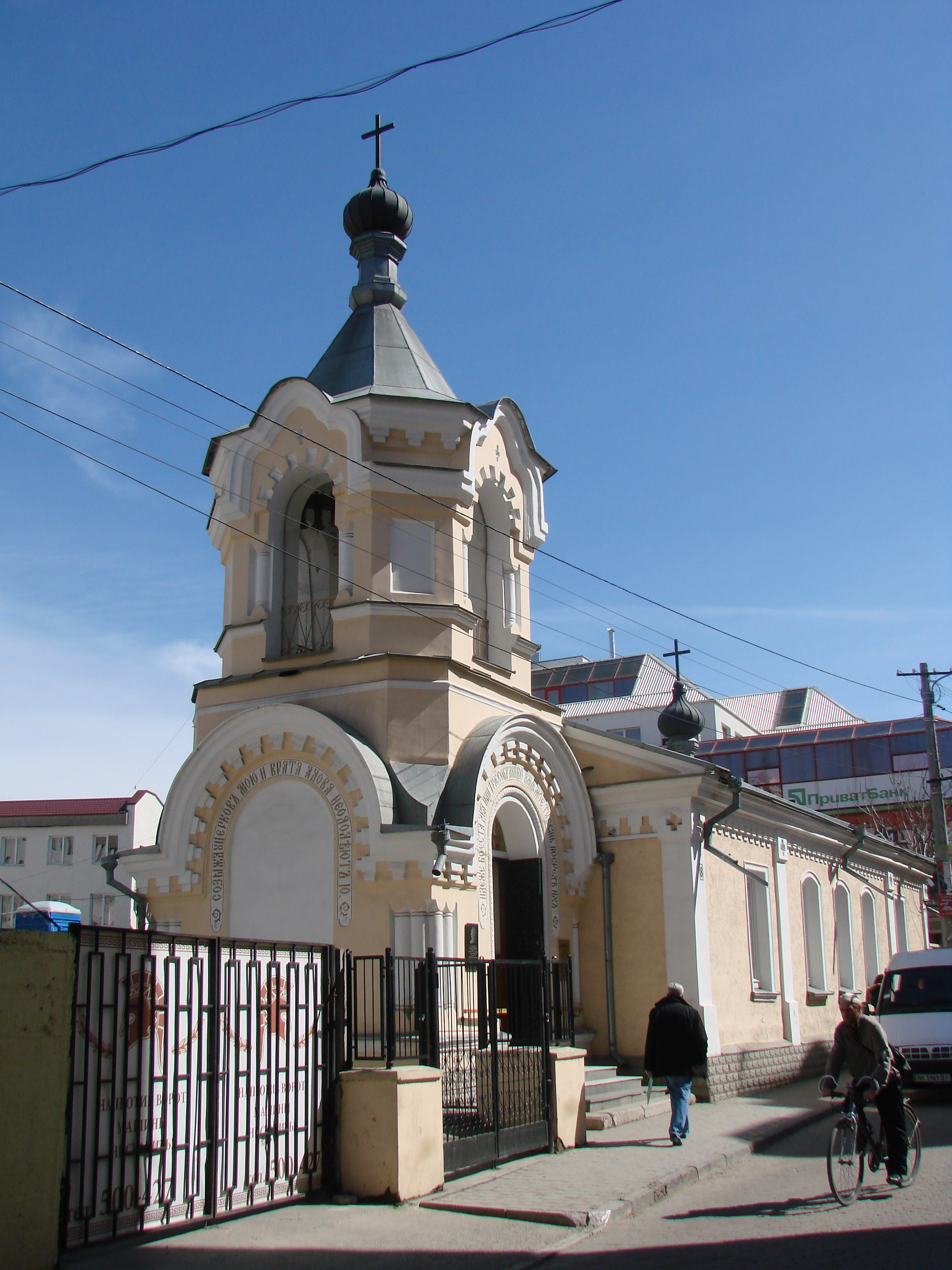
Saints Constantine and Helena church

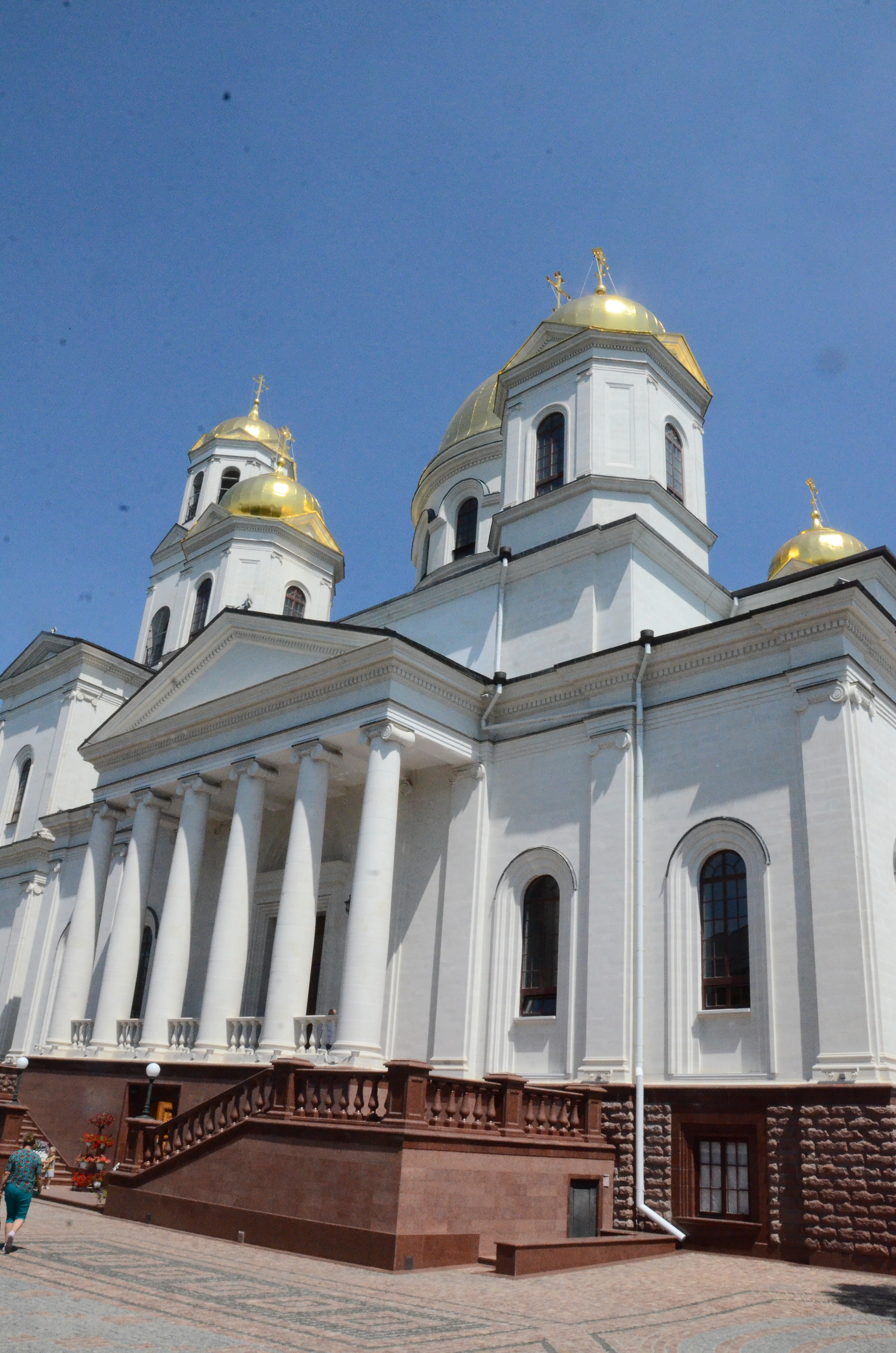
Alexander Nevsky Cathedral

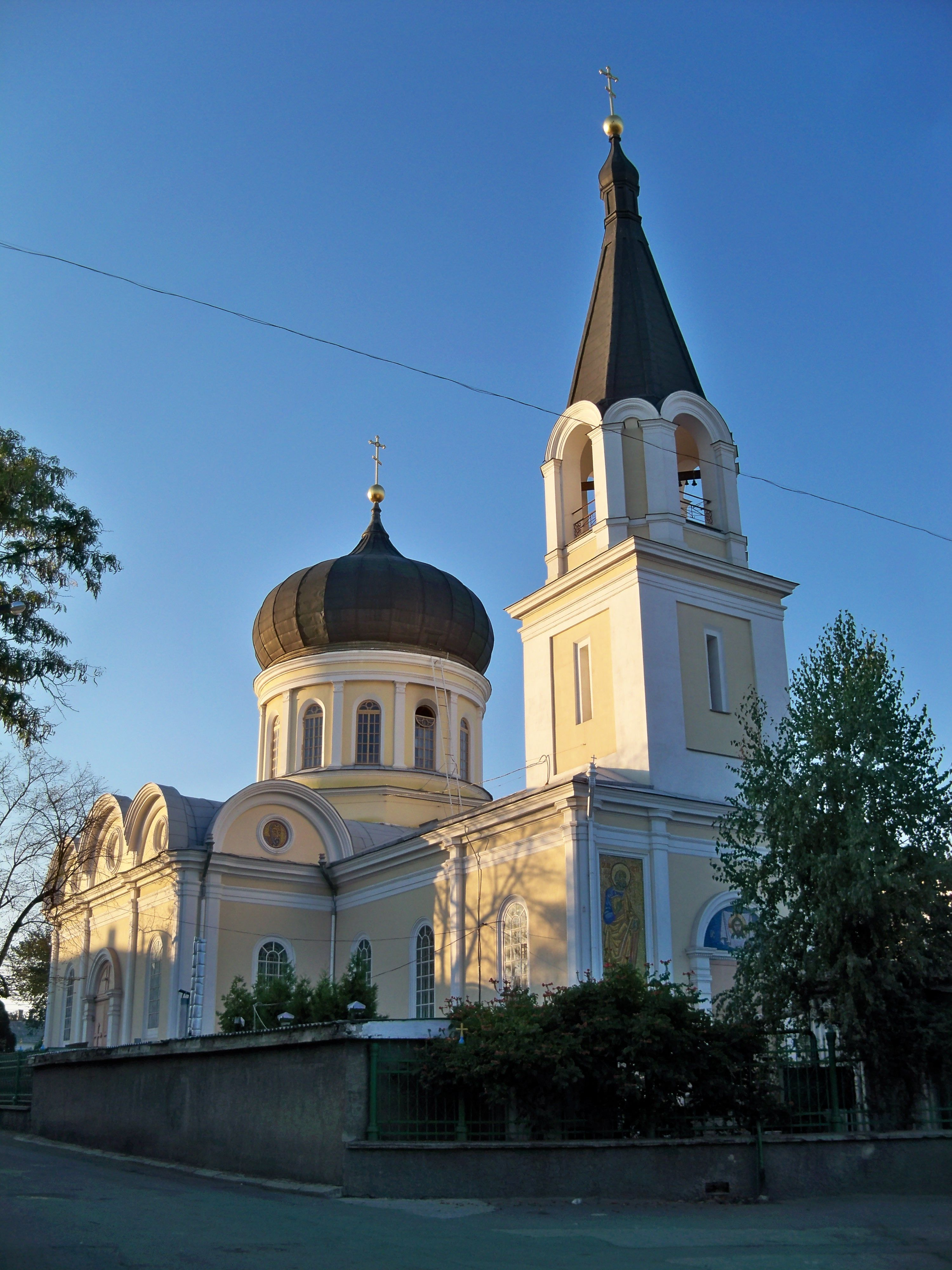
Saints Peter and Paul church

- Kebir-Jami Mosque, Simferopol
- Holy Trinity Cathedral, Simferopol

== Notable people ==
=== Art and entertainment ===
- Alexei Stepanov (1858–1923), russian genre painter, illustrator, and art teacher
- Nicolai Ivanovich Kravchenko (1867–1941), battle painter, journalist, and writer
- Rachel Devirys (1890–1983), film actress
- Max Alpert (1899–1980), photographer who worked on the front lines during World War 2.
- Andrei Abrikosov (1906–1973), stage and film actor
- Zara Levina (1906–1976), pianist and composer
- Bob Sredersas (1910–1982), art collector
- Georges Vitaly (1917–2007), theatre director, actor, and manager
- Roman Filippov (1936–1992), theatre and film actor
- Valery Sigalevitch (born 1950), classical concert pianist
- Denis Bouriakov (born 1981), principal flautist of the Los Angeles Philharmonic
- Dorofeeva (born 1990), singer and fashion designer
- Diana Tishchenko (born 1990), classical violinist

=== Science and academia ===
- Evgenii Wulff (1885–1941), biologist, botanist, and plant geographer
- Viktor Grebennikov (1927–2001), scientist, naturalist, entomologist, and paranormal researcher
- Sergey Mergelyan (1928–2008), mathematician and scientist
- Yuri Manin (1937–2023), mathematician known for his work in algebraic & diophantine geometry
- Valeri F. Venda (born 1937), psychologist, engineer, and designer
- Oleg Kotov (born 1965), cosmonaut
- Gennady Samokhin (born 1971), speleologist
- Evhen Tsybulenko (born 1972), professor of international law

=== Politics and activism ===
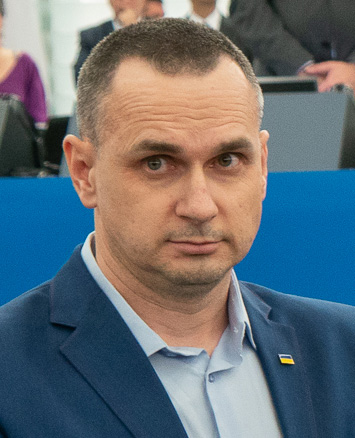
Oleg Sentsov in 2018

- Anna Kuliscioff (1857–1925), revolutionary, feminist, and Marxist socialist militant
- Adolph Joffe (1883–1927), revolutionary, politician, and diplomat
- Musa Mamut (1931–1978), deported Crimean Tatar who self-immolated in protest
- Leonid Pilunsky (1947-2021), politician (Rukh) and former member of the Verkhovna Rada of Crimea
- Andriy Senchenko (born 1959), politician and a former member of the Ukrainian parliament
- Yelyzaveta Bohutska (born 1964), public activist and member of the Ukrainian parliament
- Oksana Ferchuk (born 1973), politician currently serving as the Minister of Digital Transformation of Ukraine
- Reşat Amet (1975–2014), Crimean Tatar activist
- Oleg Sentsov (born 1976), filmmaker, writer, and political activist
- Serhiy Kokurin (1978–2014), military officer who was the first soldier killed in the Russo-Ukrainian War
- Andrey Kozenko (born 1981), former statesman and politician
- Pavlo Kazarin (born 1983), journalist and political commentator
- Tamila Tasheva (born 1985), politician (Holos) and former Presidential representative of Ukraine in Crimea
- Olexandr Kolchenko (born 1989), left-wing activist, ecologist, and archaeologist

=== Religion and literature ===
- Saint Luke of Simferopol (1877–1961), surgeon and Archbishop of Simferopol
- Vera Mikhailova (1907–1985), Soviet children's writer and journalist
- Ilya Selvinsky (1899–1968), poet, dramatist, memoirist, and essayist

=== Sport ===
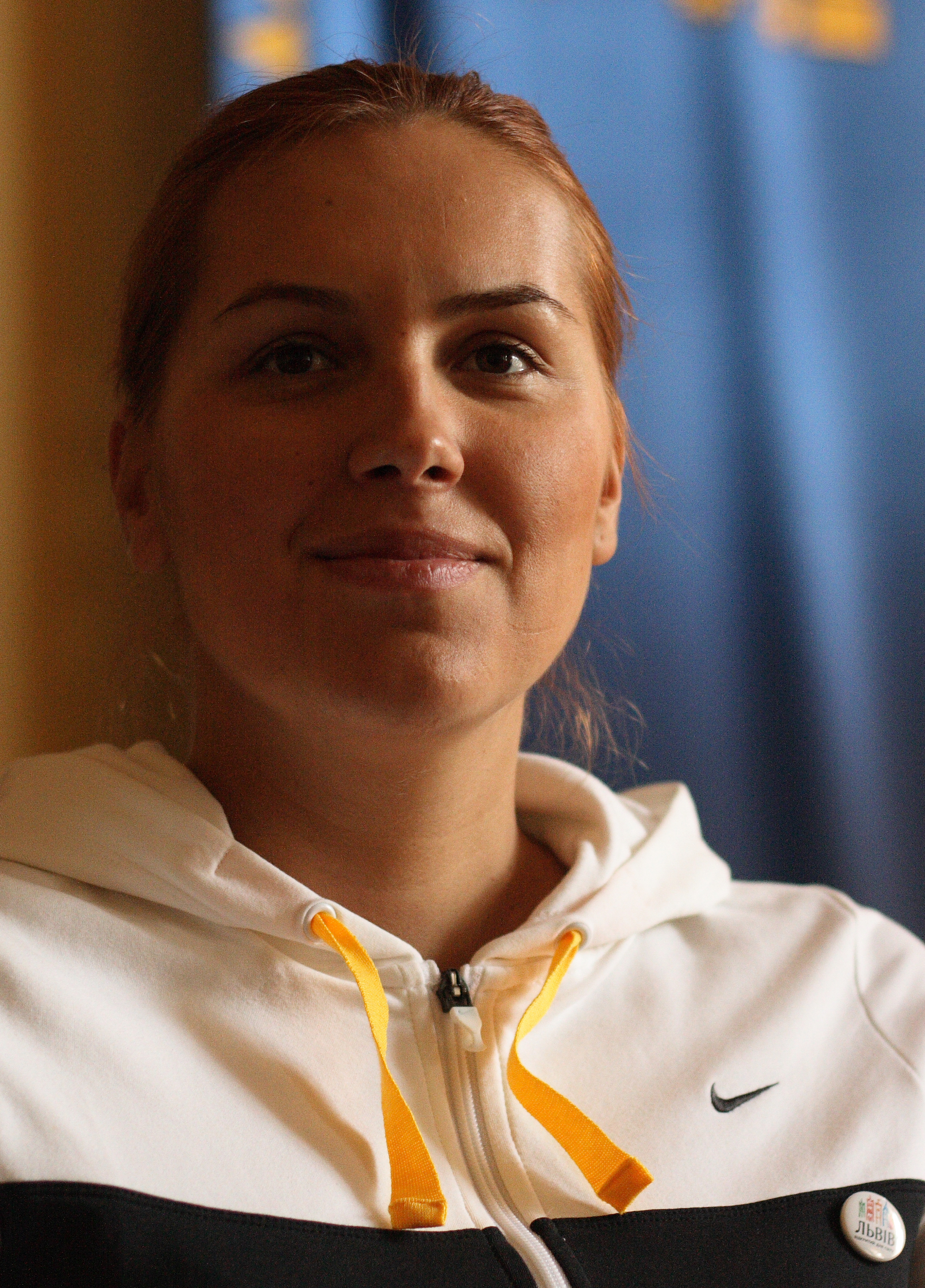
Yana Klochkova in 2010

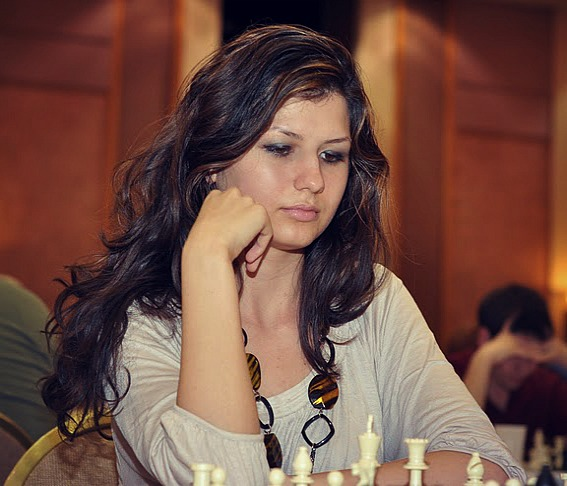
Alisa Melekhina in 2014

- Oleksandr Usyk (born 1987), heavyweight boxer and Olympic gold medallist
- Anatoliy Zayayev (1931–2012), former football player and coach
- Anatoly Cherepovich (1936-1970), cyclist and Olympic athlete
- Kateryna Serebrianska (born 1977), individual rhythmic gymnast and Olympic gold medallist
- Lyudmila Blonska (born 1977), heptathlete
- Serhiy Dotsenko (born 1979), boxer and Olympic silver medallist
- Yana Klochkova (born 1982), swimmer and five-time Olympic medalist
- Andriy Hryvko (born 1983), cyclist for Astana
- Sergey Karjakin (born 1990), chess grandmaster who qualified for the title at the age of 12 years and 7 months
- Alisa Melekhina (born 1991), chess master
- Hanna Rizatdinova (born 1993), individual rhythmic gymnast and Olympic bronze medallist
- Natalia Popova (born 1993), competitive figure skater and Olympian
- Gleb Bakshi (born 1995), boxer and Olympic bronze medallist
- Daniil Khlusevich (born 2001), professional footballer for Spartak Moscow

== International relations ==
=== Twin towns – Sister cities ===
Simferopol is currently twinned with:

- Salem, Oregon, United States (1986)
- Heidelberg, Germany (1991)
- Kecskemét, Hungary (2006)
- Tepebaşı, Turkey (2007)
- Bursa, Turkey
- Irkutsk, Russia (2008)
- Moscow, Russia (2008)
- Novocherkassk, Russia (2008)
- Omsk, Russia (2008)
- Ruse, Bulgaria (2008)
- Nizhny Novgorod, Russia (2016)

== Namegiving ==
The reconnaissance ship Simferopol of the Ukrainian Navy ist named after the city.
