= Vitalina Dzoz =

Russian-Ukrainian politician (born 1955)

- Віталіна Дзоз
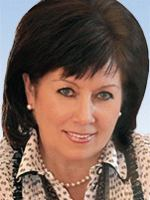
- A photo of her from 2012.

People's Deputy of Ukraine
- In office 12 December 2012 – 27 November 2014
- Constituency: Autonomous Republic of Crimea, No. 1

Personal details
- Born: Vitalina Alekseevna Dzoz; 16 December 1955 (age 70) Kryvyi Rih, Ukrainian SSR, Soviet Union
- Party: Party of Regions (2012-2014)
- Education: V. I. Vernadsky Taurida National University (1978); National Academy for Public Administration (1999)

Vitalina Alekseevna Dzoz (Ukrainian: Віталіна Олексіївна Дзоз; Russian: Виталина Алексеевна Дзоз; born 16 December 1955) is a Russian and formerly Ukrainian politician and teacher who served as a People's Deputy of Ukraine in the Verkhovna Rada representing the 7th convocation from 2012 to its premature end in 2014 with the Party of Regions. Prior to this, she was a longtime politician in Crimea, have been Deputy Chairman of the Council of Ministers of Crimea, and also Minister of Education and Science for Crimea from 2010 to 2012. During the 2014 Russian annexation of Crimea, she sided with Russia.

== Early life ==
Dzoz was born on 16 November 1955 in the city of Kryvyi Rih, which was then part of the Ukrainian SSR in the Soviet Union. After moving to Crimea and finishing secondary school, she pursued higher education, graduating from the V. I. Vernadsky Taurida National University with a specialisation in biology and the qualification of a teacher of biology and chemistry in 1978. She then worked until the collapse of the Soviet Union in 1990 as a teacher of biology and later also a deputy director for educational work and as a principal. Later on in 1999, she also graduated from the National Academy for Public Administration with a master's degree in state management.

== Political career ==
=== 1990-2012: Early career in Crimea ===
Dzoz first entered politics in 1990, when she was appointed deputy chairman of the Massandra City Council, which is near the city of Yalta. Her term was viewed controversially because some residents accused her of land fraud with the company "Konsol", with others also accusing her of destroying gardens to create new buildings. After a term in the post, she was promoted to chairman of the council, a post she held until 2002. Afterwards, she was elected to the Verkhovna Rada of Crimea (BC APK). Upon joining the BC APK, she was briefly Deputy Chair of the Council of Ministers of Crimea on an acting basis before being dismissed. Three years later, from September 2005 to May 2006, she also served as Chair of the Standing Committee on Social Affairs and Health Care in the BC APK. Her political career was temporarily halted when she was expelled from the ranks of the Socialist Party of Ukraine (SPU) during her race for Mayor of Yalta on charges of "discrediting the party" and also because she failed to be re-elected in Massandra over the land fraud scandal.

==== Minister of Education in Crimea ====
On 18 August 2010, she was appointed Minister of Education and Council by the Prime Minister of Crimea, Vasyl Dzharty. Her appointment was speculated to be because of her friendship with the then Chairman of the BC APK, Vladimir Konstantinov, whom she had known since her time in Massandra. She was retained in the post after Dzharty soon after died in 2011, with Anatolii Mohyliov succeeding him. During her time as Minister of Education of Crimea, she primarily focused on transportation issues. She helped purchase a large number of school buses in 2012 during the campaign season. She also complained about the state of school buildings and that financing for repairs needed to be done immediately. Regarding the language issue, she said that everyone should be able to study in their native language, and she said she would preserve classes with the Crimean Tatar language.

=== 2012-2014: Verkhovna Rada ===
In 2012, during the upcoming 2012 Ukrainian parliamentary elections, Dzoz announced her intentions to run for parliament in constituency No. 1 with the Party of Regions. At the time of its formation, the constituency consisted of the Zaliznychnyi District and Central District of Simferopol. During the campaign season, her main opponent, a then Crimean deputy, Leonid Hrach, stated in a letter with education workers in 2012 that she had "destroyed the formation of Crimea" by closing boarding schools and for her appointments that favoured what Hrach thought was unqualified people. She would end up winning the election, though, with 38.76% of the vote (27,937 people) against the self-nominated Hrach, who got 17.98% (12,960 people) and the Communist Party of Ukraine candidate Oleg Solomakhin, who got 10.58% (7,630 people). Upon joining the Verkhovna Rada, she immediately joined the Party of Regions faction and was appointed Chairman of the Subcommittee on Preschool, General Secondary, and Out-of-School Education within the Committee on Science and Education.

==== Russian annexation of Crimea ====
During the Euromaidan protests, in February 2014, she said that the new government that had been formed was stigmatizing the people in the south of Ukraine. In addition, Dzoz said that the new government was trying to "impose on us what language to speak" and that they were disrespecting Crimea's autonomy. Shortly after the 2014 Russian annexation of Crimea, she sided with Russia, joined the Russian party Patriots of Russia, and supported the holding of the 2014 Crimean status referendum and "reunification" with Russia. However, because she had initially retained her Ukrainian citizenship, she was expelled from the Patriots of Russia party in June. Shortly thereafter, she left the Party of Regions in the Verkhovna Rada and joined the pro-Russian faction "For Peace and Stability". She officially announced her resignation from the Verkhovna Rada in September 2014. She said she resigned in connection with the first elections that took place in Crimea because she had become a Russian citizen.

== Career in Russia ==
After the end of her mandate and her move to Russia, Dzoz retired from politics and only reappeared in 2017. That year, she became a member of the Academic Council and First Deputy Director of the Humanitarian and Pedagogical Academy branch at the V. I. Vernadsky Taurida National University in Yalta. She then appeared in some media capacities representing the university throughout 2017.
