= Kebir Mosque, Simferopol =

Sunni mosque in Simferopol, Crimea

Kebir Mosque
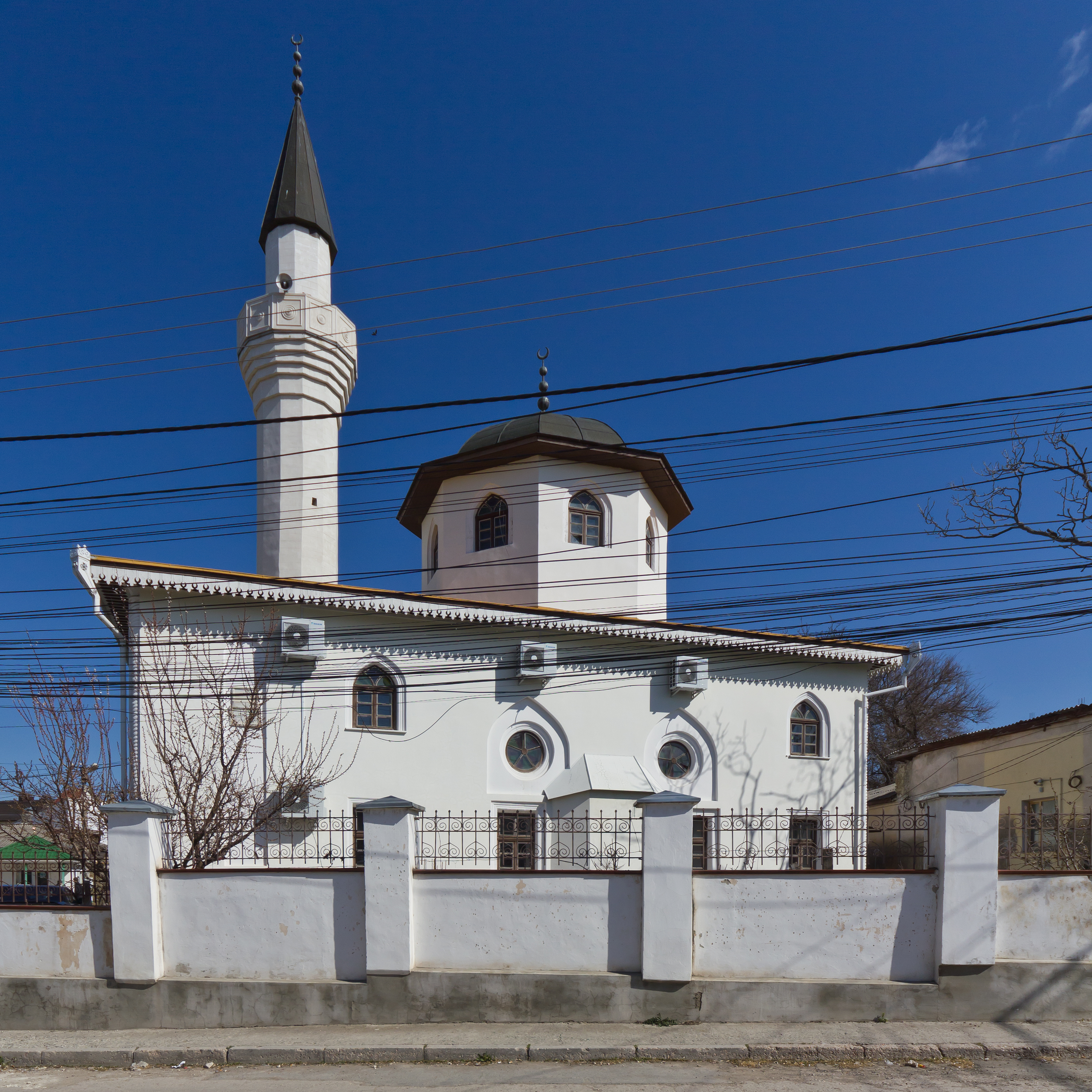

Religion
- Affiliation: Islam
- Rite: Sunni
- Status: Active

Location
- Location: Simferopol
- Interactive map of Kebir Mosque
- Territory: (Autonomous Republic of Crimea) AR Crimea (de jure) (Autonomous Republic of Crimea) Republic of Crimea (de facto)
- Coordinates: 44°56′56″N 34°06′25″E

Architecture
- Architects: Original 1508 architect: Abdurakhman-bek-Ali; 1991 architects: A. Abdurakhmanov and S. Khalilov
- Type: Mosque
- Style: Turkish worship
- Completed: 1508

Specifications
- Capacity: 200
- Length: 18 m (59 ft)
- Width: 14 m (46 ft)
- Dome: 1
- Minaret: 1

Immovable Monument of Local Significance of Ukraine
- Official name: Мечеть Кебір-Джамі (Kebir Cami Mosque)
- Type: Architecture
- Reference no.: 4791-АР

The Kebir Mosque (Russian: Кебир-Джами; Ukrainian: Кебір-Джамі; Crimean Tatar: Kebir Cami; Turkish: Kebir Camii, all transliterated as Kebir-Jami) is located in Simferopol, Crimea. The Kebir Mosque is a prominent architectural monument in Simferopol and the oldest building in the city.

== History ==
In 1508, or 914 Hijri by the Muslim calendar, Kebir Mosque was dedicated. Writing at the entrance of the mosque in Arabic states: "This mosque was built for the Glory of the Mightiness of the Khan Meñli I Giray, may Allah forgive all sins of himself and his children in the month of Muharram in the year of nine hundred and fourteen". It is believed that the white walls of the mosque gave name to the medieval city of Aqmescit (White Mosque). Through the years the mosque has undergone reconstruction many times.

After World War II Kebir mosque was left in a state of neglect. For several years the mosque was used as a book-cover workshop. After the return of the Crimean Tatars from deportation a revival of the old mosque began: in 1989 the mosque was given back to the Muslim community. Reconstruction began in late October 1991.

Today, Kebir Mosque is the main Friday mosque of Crimea, it is the residence of the Mufti and the location of the Spiritual Direction of the Muslims of Crimea. The grounds also included a madrasah (educational institution) and the Crimean Tatar library.

== See also ==
- Religion in Crimea
- List of mosques in Russia
- List of mosques in Europe
