= Mikhail Afanasev =

Russian and former Ukrainian politician (born 1982)

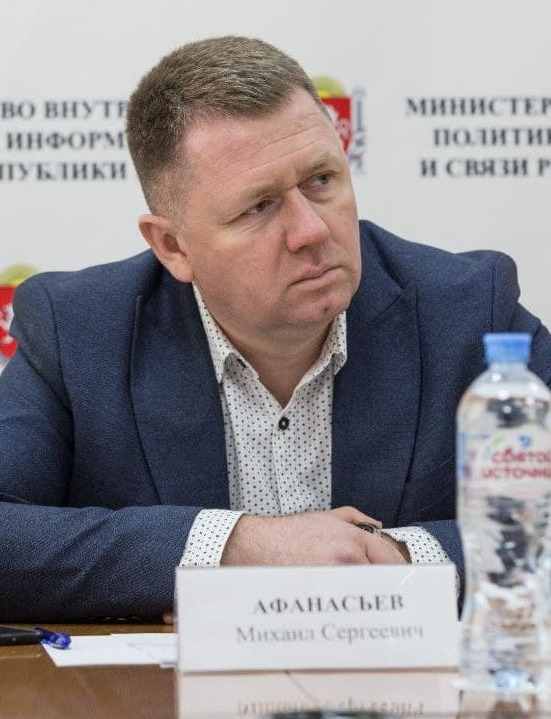

Mayor city of Simferopol
- Incumbent
- Assumed office 22 March 2022
- President: Vladimir Putin
- Head of the Republic: Sergey Aksyonov
- Preceded by: Valentin Demidov; Mikhail Balakhanov (acting)

Minister of Internal Policy, Information and Communications of the Republic of Crimea
- In office 4 February 2020 – 21 March 2022
- Preceded by: Sergey Zyryanov
- Succeeded by: Sergey Dvurechensky (acting)

Mayor city of Saky
- In office 1 November 2019 – 3 February 2020
- Preceded by: Andrey Ivkin
- Succeeded by: Alekesandr Ovdienko

Judge of the district administrative сourt of the Autonomous Republic of Crimea
- In office 2 November 2013 – 17 March 2014

Personal details
- Born: Mykhaylo Serhiyovych Afanasyev; 17 May 1982 (age 44) Sevastopol, Ukrainian SSR, Soviet Union

Mikhail Sergeyevich Afanasev (Russian: Михаил Сергеевич Афанасьев; Ukrainian: Михайло Сергійович Афанасьєв, romanized: Mykhaylo Serhiyovych Afanasyev; Crimean Tatar: Mihail Sergeeviç Afanasev; born on 17 May 1982), is a Russian and former Ukrainian politician. Mayor city of Simferopol since 22 March 2022.

He had been the Minister of Internal Policy, Information and Communications of the Republic of Crimea from to 2020 to 2022. He had also served as the Head of Saky from 2019 to 2020.

== Biography ==
Mikhail Afanasev was born Mykhaylo Serhiyovych Afanasyev in Sevastopol on 17 May 1982.

He began his career in 2001 as a legal adviser to PE LA "Business Law Protection".

In 2004, he graduated from the Tauride National University named after V. I. Vernadsky with a degree in jurisprudence.

From 2004 to 2009, he worked as an assistant judge of the Yevpatoria City Court, head of the legal department of the Evpatoria United State Tax Inspectorate, head of the legal department of the State Tax Inspectorate of Yevpatoria. From April 2009 to January 2012 he was the head of the legal department of the State Tax Administration in the Autonomous Republic of Crimea.

In April 2012, he was appointed a judge of the Saki City District Court for five years. In November 2013, he was transferred to the position of judge of the District Administrative Court of the Autonomous Republic of Crimea, where he held until December 2014.

From March to July 2015, he was the Deputy Head of the Interdistrict Inspectorate of the Federal Tax Service No. 6 for the Republic of Crimea. From July 2015 to August 2019, he was the Deputy Minister of Labor and Social Protection of the Republic of Crimea.

On 16 August 2019, Afansev became the acting head of Saky within the Republic of Crimea. He was officially dismissed as a judge of the Saki City District Court of the Autonomous Republic of Crimea by the decision of the High Council of Justice of Ukraine on 22 August 2019 as the result of the appointment. He took office on 1 November.

On 3 February 2020, Afansev stepped down as the Head of Saky to focus on becoming the Minister of Internal Policy, Information and Communications of the Republic of Crimea. He was sworn into office on 4 February.

On 11 March 2022, Afansev participated in the competition to fill the vacant position of the head of Simferopol, reaching the final with 79 points. On 14 March, at the session of the Simferopol City Council, he was unanimously elected the head of Simferopol. On 22 March, he officially took office.

== Honors and titles ==
- Commendation from the Chairman of the Council of Ministers of the Autonomous Republic of Crimea (2009)
- Honored Lawyer of the Autonomous Republic of Crimea (2010)
- Order "For Loyalty to Duty" (November 2, 2023) — for impeccable performance of official duties and in connection with National Unity Day

== Family ==
Married. According to RIA Novy Den, the Minister of Economic Development of the Republic of Crimea, Dmitry Sheryako, is Afanasyev’s brother-in-law, and the head of the administration of the city of Saky, Alexander Ovdiyenko, is his father-in-law.
