= Bitumne =

- Village
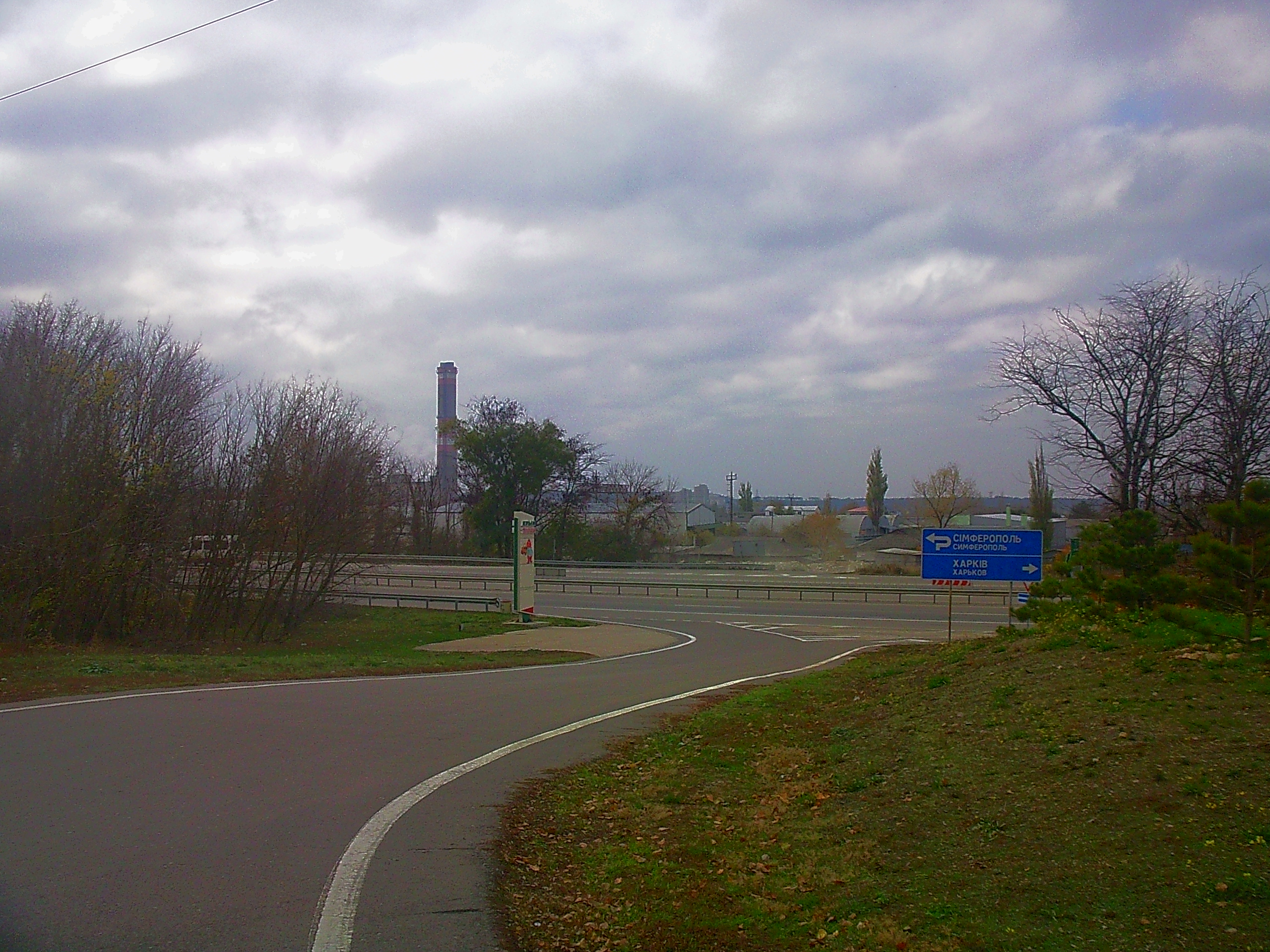

- Location within Crimea
- Coordinates: 45°01′10″N 34°02′41″E
- Country: Disputed: Ukraine (de jure); Russia (de facto)
- Region: (Autonomous Republic of Crimea) Crimea^{1}
- Municipality: Simferopol

Population
  - Total: 242
- Time zone: UTC+4 (MSK)
- ^{1} Autonomous Republic of Crimea (de jure) or Republic of Crimea (de facto), depending on jurisdiction.

Bitumne (Russian: Битумное; Ukrainian: Бітумне; Crimean Tatar: Qara Qıyat) is a village located in Simferopol Municipality. Population: 242 (2014 Census).

== See also ==
- Simferopol Municipality
