= Kyivskyi District, Simferopol =

Kyivskyi District
- Urban district in Simferopol
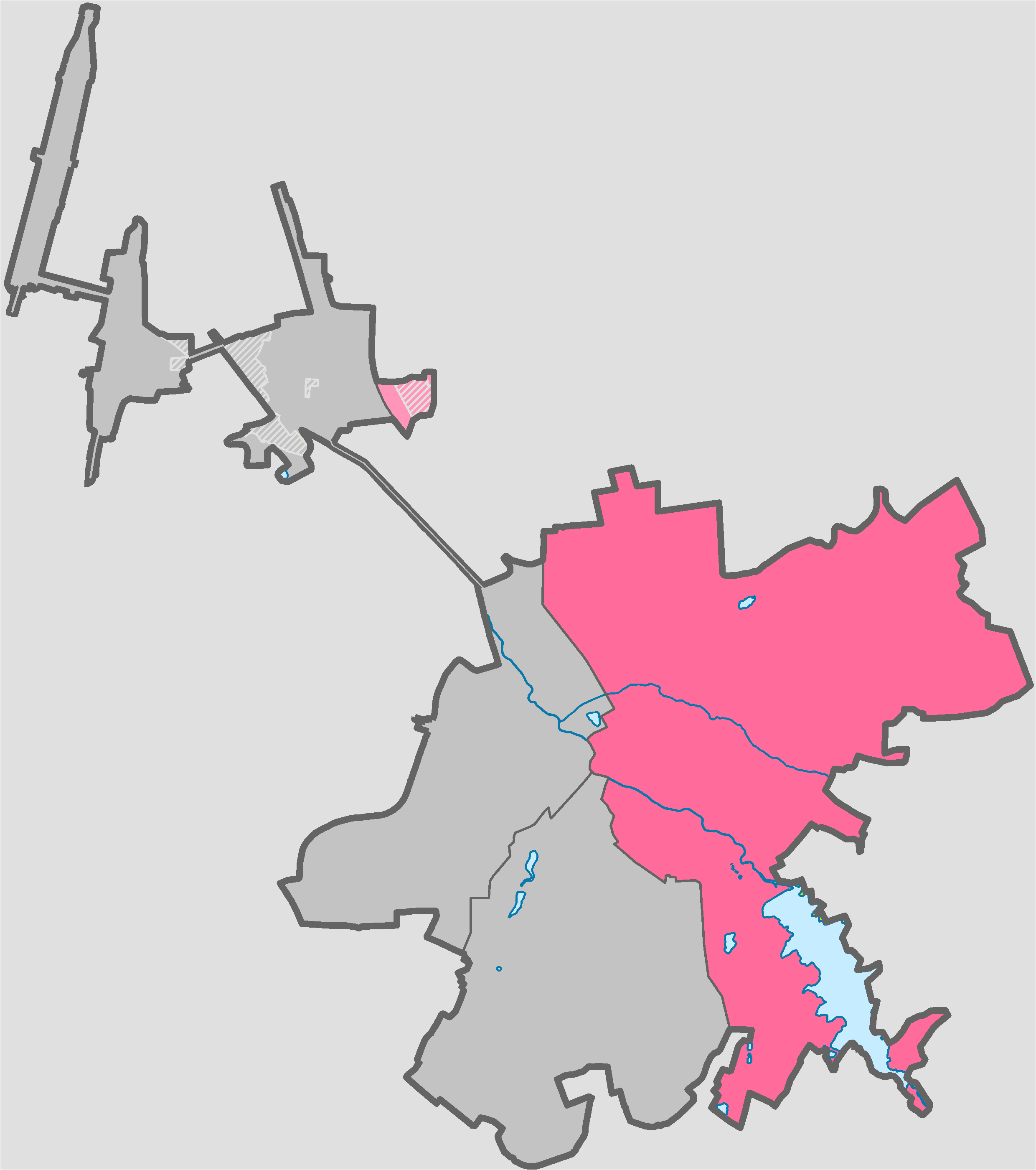
- Coordinates: 44°57′0″N 34°6′0″E
- Country: Disputed: Ukraine (de jure); Russia (de facto)
- Region: (Autonomous Republic of Crimea) Crimea^{1}
- Municipality: Simferopol

Area
  - Total: 40.5 km^{2} (15.6 sq mi)

Population
  - Total: 154,595
- Time zone: UTC+4 (MSK)
- ^{1} Autonomous Republic of Crimea (de jure) or Republic of Crimea (de facto), depending on jurisdiction.

Kyivskyi District (Russian: Киевский район; Ukrainian: Київський район) is an administrative raion (district) of the city of Simferopol. Population: 154,595 (2014 Census).

== See also ==
- Simferopol Municipality
