= Simferopol Municipality =

Simferopol City Municipality Симферопольский горсовет
- Municipality
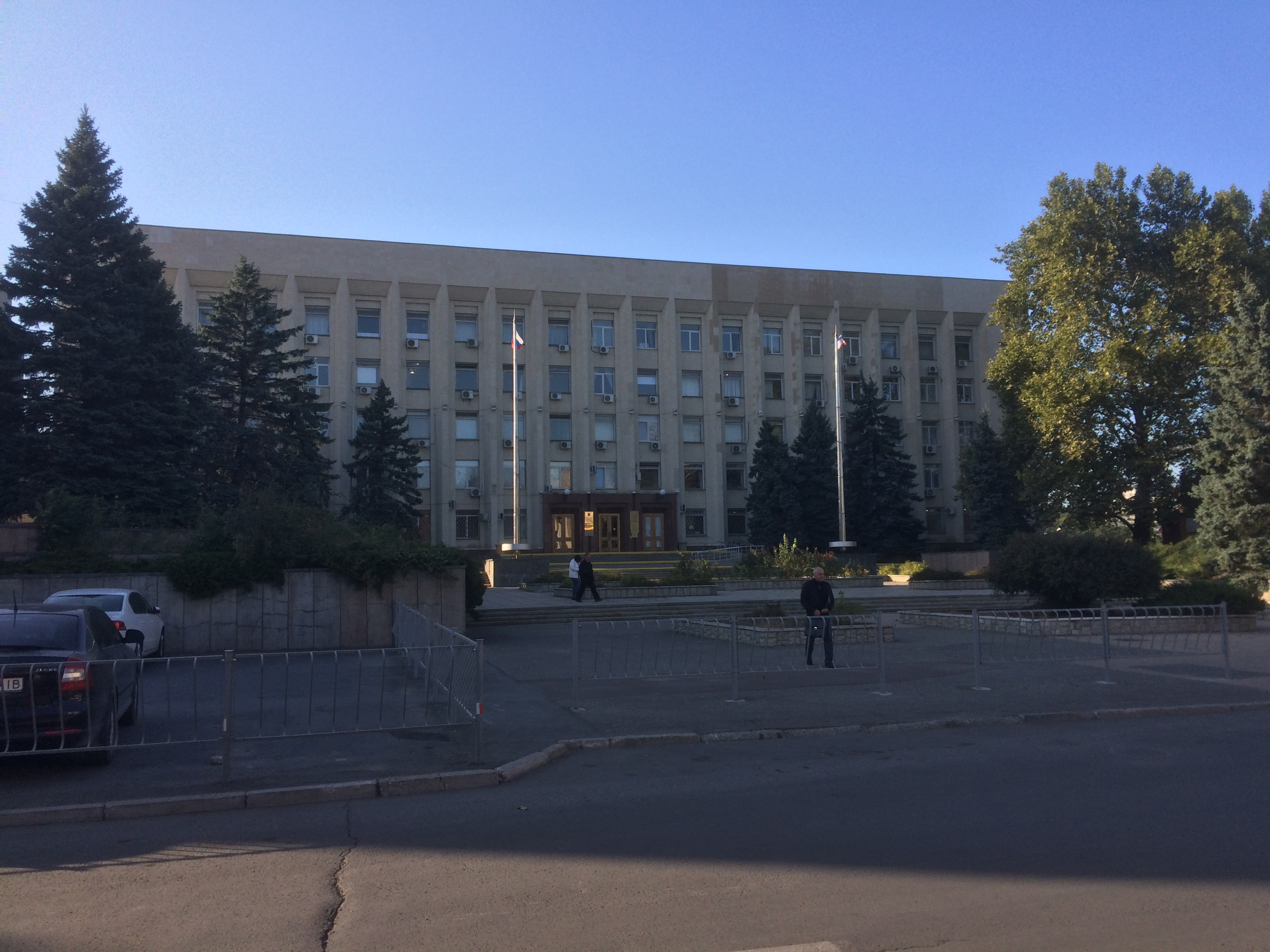
- Simferopol Municipality Council

- Flag Coat of arms
- Location within Crimea
- Coordinates: 44°57′30″N 34°06′35″E
- Country: Disputed: Ukraine (de jure); Russia (de facto)
- Region: (Autonomous Republic of Crimea) Crimea^{1}
- Capital: Simferopol
- Subdivisions: List: 1 cities; 4 towns; 1 villages

Area
  - Total: 107 km^{2} (41 sq mi)

Population (213)
  - Total: 352,363
  - Density: 3,290/km^{2} (8,530/sq mi)
- Time zone: UTC+3 (MSK)
- Dialing code: +380-652
- Website: simgov.ru , de facto
- ^{1} Autonomous Republic of Crimea (de jure) or Republic of Crimea (de facto), depending on jurisdiction.

Simferopol City Municipality (Ukrainian: Сімферопольська міськa рада, romanized: Simferopolska miska rada; Russian: Симферопольский горсовет, romanized: Simferopolskiy gorsovet; Crimean Tatar: Aqmescit şeer şurası) is one of the 25 regions of the Crimean peninsula in Ukraine currently occupied by Russia. Population: 352,363 (2014 Census).

== Administrative divisions ==
The Simferopol City Municipality's territory is subdivided into 3 urban districts:

- Kyivsky District
- Tsentralnyi District
- Zheleznodorozhny District

Besides the Crimean capital Simferopol, the region includes:

4 towns

- Hresivskyi
- Aeroflotskyi
- Komsomolske
- Ahrarne

1 village

- Bitumne

== History ==
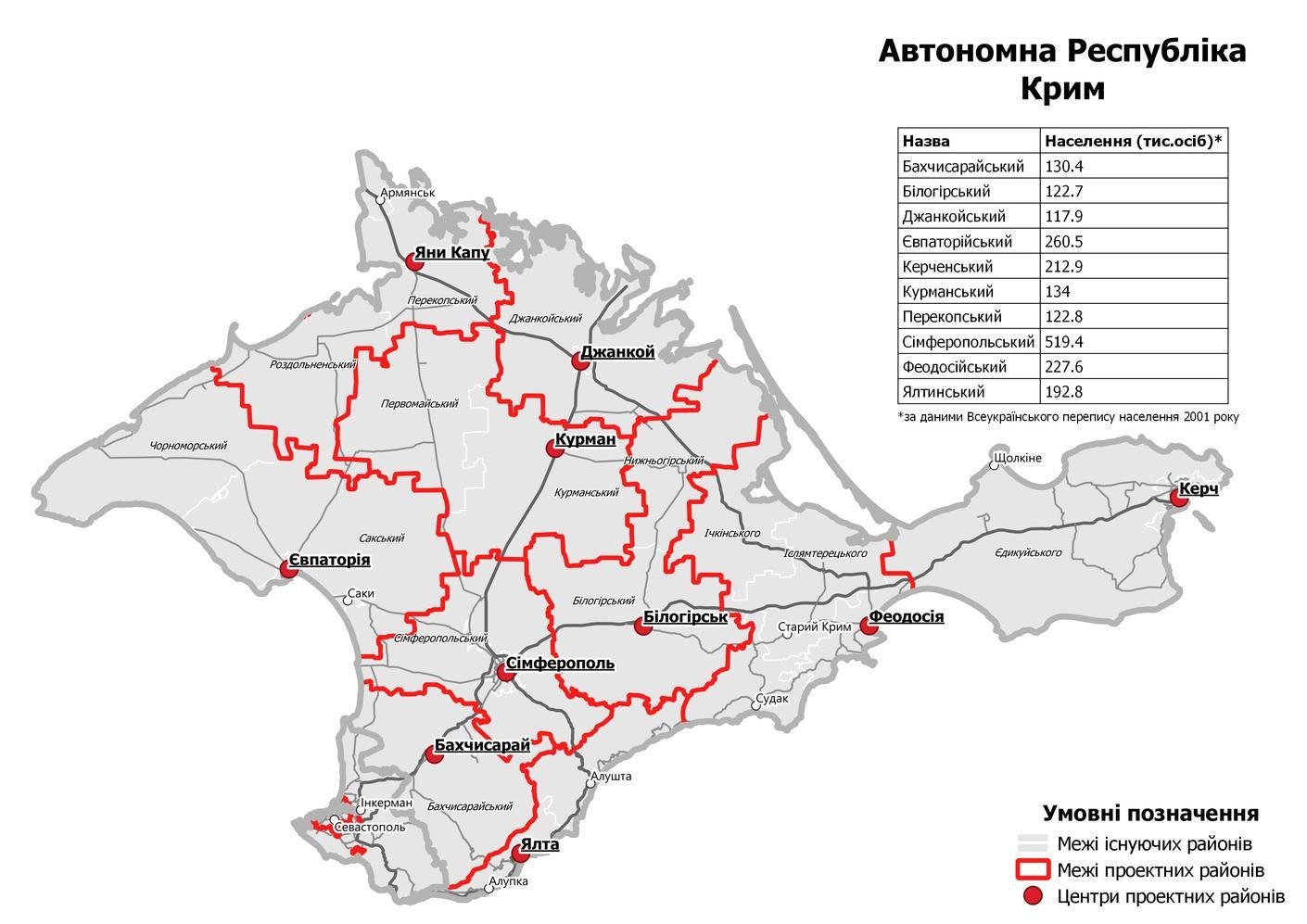
In July 2020, the Verkhovna Rada approved an administrative reform in Crimea

The city was founded in 1784. In 1921, Simferopol Municipality passed a resolution protesting against Russian agitation for pogroms against Crimean Jews in the Soviet Union. In 2014, Simferopol Municipality was one of 25 regions in Crimea occupied by the 2014 Russian invasion of Crimea. In 2018, the Russian-installed mayor of the municipality resigned, along with eight councillors, after being requested to by the Russian Republic of Crimea's State Council of Crimea. This was due to alleged mismanagement of the municipality's transport and waste management infrastructure.

In July 2020, Ukraine conducted an administrative reform throughout its de jure territory. This included Crimea, which was at the time occupied by Russia, and is still ongoing as of October 2023. Crimea was reorganized from 14 raions and 11 municipalities into 10 raions, with municipalities abolished altogether.

Simferopol Municipality was abolished, and its territories to become a part of Simferopol Raion, but this has not yet been implemented due to the ongoing Russian occupation.
