= Aeroflotskyi =

Urban-type settlement in Crimea

Aeroflotskyi Аерофлотський
- Urban-type settlement
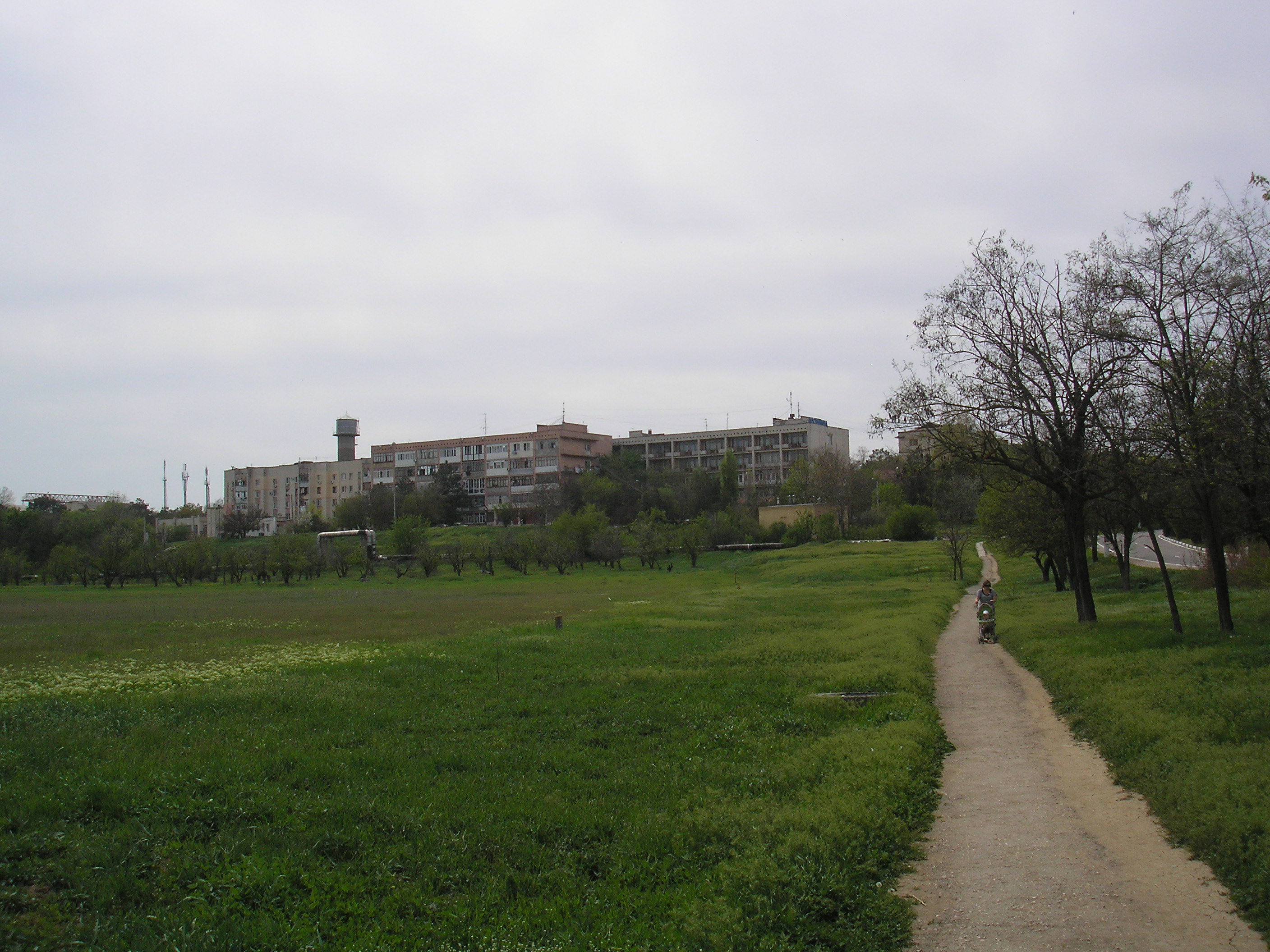

- Location within Crimea
- Coordinates: 45°01′12″N 34°00′05″E
- Country: Disputed: Ukraine (de jure); Russia (de facto)
- Region: (Autonomous Republic of Crimea) Crimea^{1}
- Municipality: Simferopol

Population
  - Total: 1,768
- Time zone: UTC+4 (MSK)
- ^{1} Autonomous Republic of Crimea (de jure) or Republic of Crimea (de facto), depending on jurisdiction.

Aeroflotskyi (Russian: Аэрофлотский; Ukrainian: Аерофло́тський; Crimean Tatar: Aeroflotskiy) is an urban-type settlement located in Simferopol Municipality, Crimea. It has a population of 1,768 (2014 Census).

== Demographics ==
According to the 2001 census, 1,961 people lived in Aeroflotskyi. The language composition was as follows:

Language	Population	Percentage
Ukrainian	75	3.82
Russian	1856	94.65
Crimean Tatar	18	0.92
Armenian	5	0.25
Belarusian	1	0.05
Bulgarian	1	0.05

== See also ==
- Simferopol Municipality
