= Ahrarne =

Urban-type settlement in Crimea

Ahrarne Аграрне
- Urban-type settlement
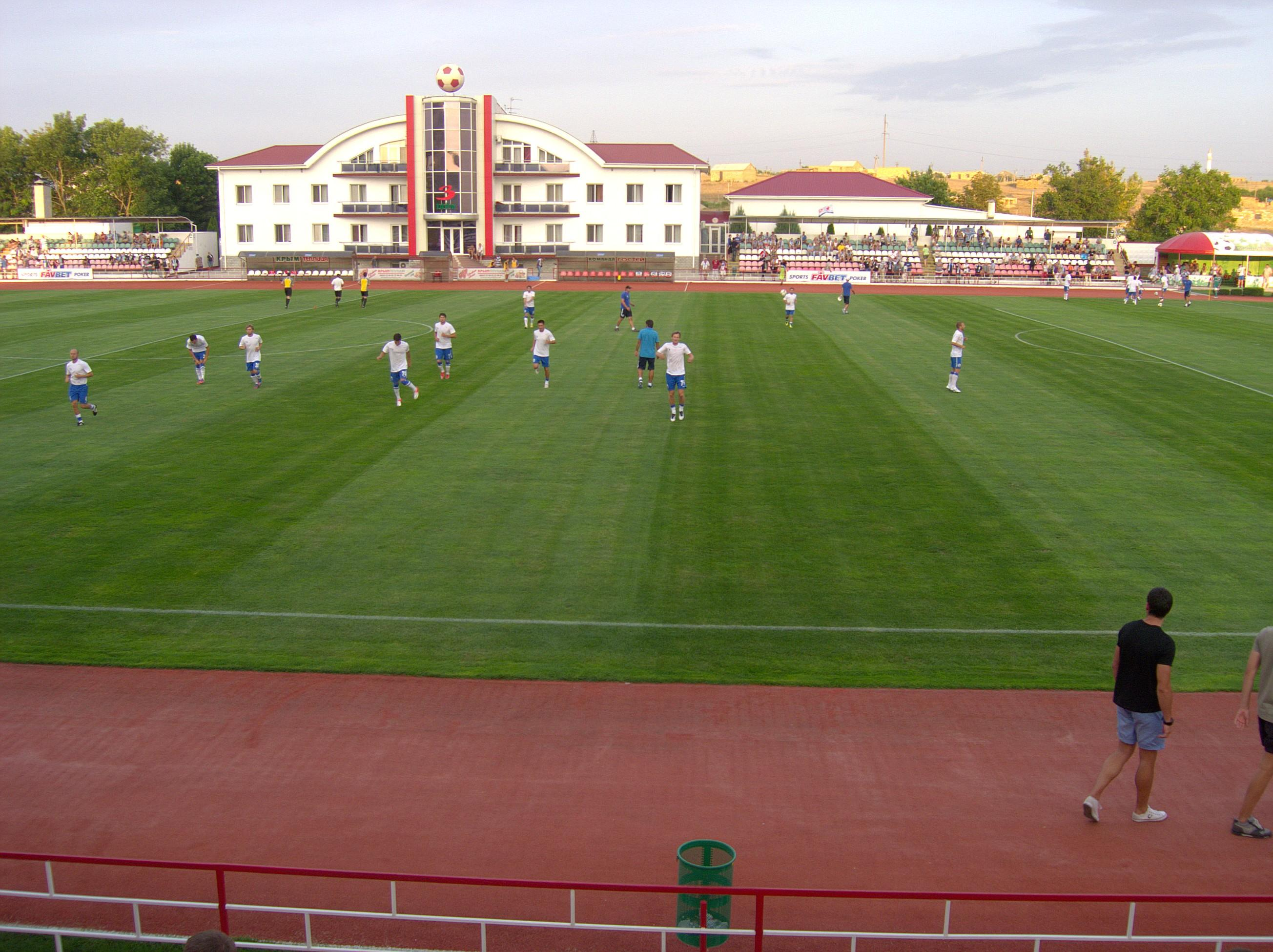

- Location within Crimea
- Coordinates: 45°00′53″N 34°03′05″E
- Country: Disputed: Ukraine (de jure); Russia (de facto)
- Region: (Autonomous Republic of Crimea) Crimea^{1}
- Municipality: Simferopol

Population
  - Total: 3,754
- Time zone: UTC+4 (MSK)
- ^{1} Autonomous Republic of Crimea (de jure) or Republic of Crimea (de facto), depending on jurisdiction.

Ahrarne (Russian: Аграрное; Ukrainian: Аграрне; Crimean Tatar: Agrarne) is an urban-type settlement located in Simferopol Municipality, Crimea. Population: 3,754 (2014 Census).

== See also ==
- Simferopol Municipality
