= Komsomolske, Crimea =

Komsomolske Комсомольське
- Urban-type settlement
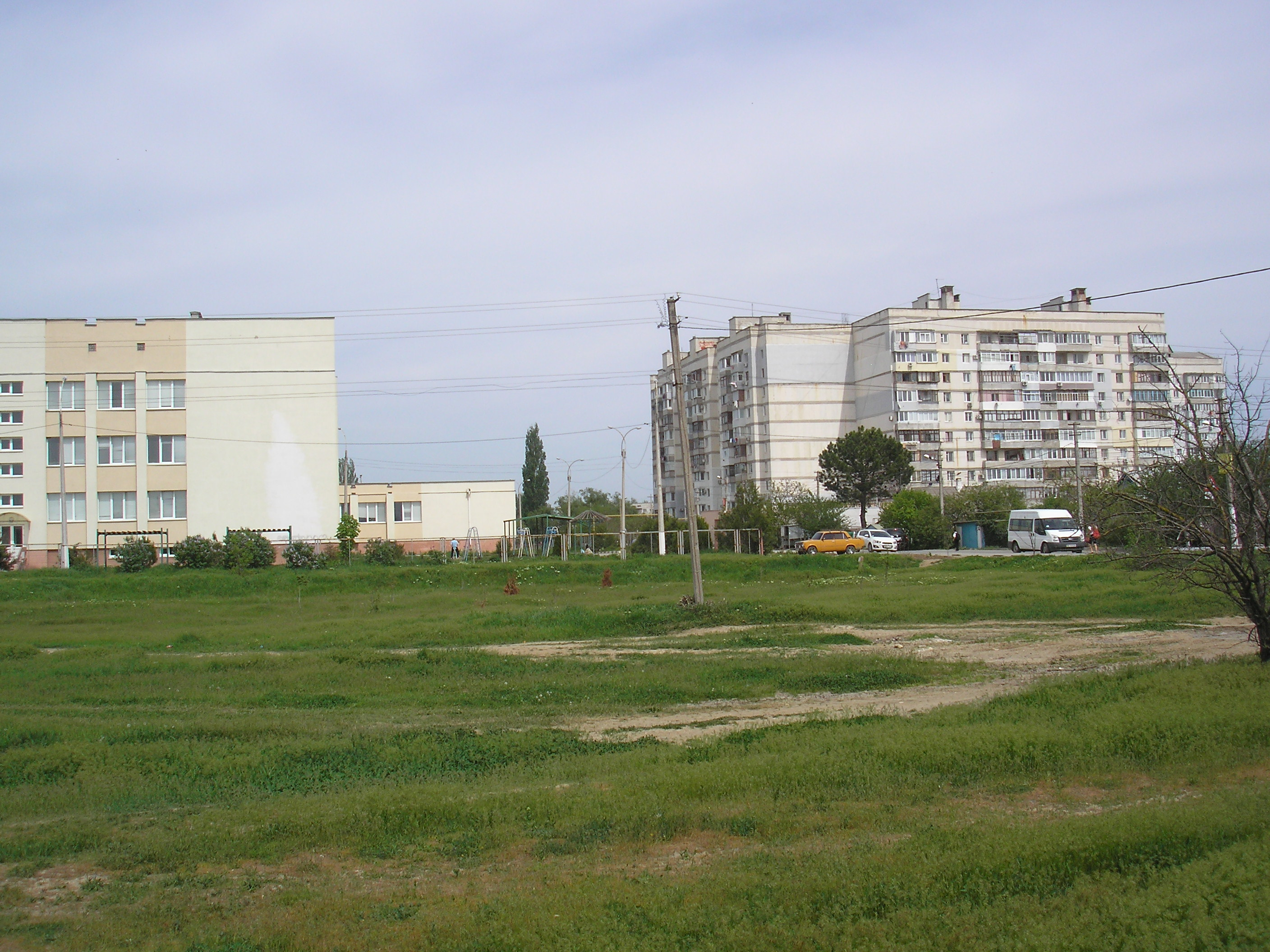

- Location within Crimea
- Coordinates: 45°01′10″N 34°01′46″E
- Country: Disputed: Ukraine (de jure); Russia (de facto)
- Region: (Autonomous Republic of Crimea) Crimea^{1}
- Municipality: Simferopol

Population
  - Total: 4,447
- Time zone: UTC+4 (MSK)
- ^{1} Autonomous Republic of Crimea (de jure) or Republic of Crimea (de facto), depending on jurisdiction.

Komsomolske (Ukrainian: Комсомольське; Russian: Комсомольское), also known as Bakachyk-Kyiat (Ukrainian: Бакачик-Кият, Crimean Tatar: Baqaçıq Qıyat), is an urban-type settlement in Simferopol Municipality, Crimea. It has a population of 4,447 (2014 Census).

== History ==
Komsomolske was founded in 1956. It received urban-type settlement status in 1993.

In 2016, as part of decommunization in Ukraine, Komsomolske was designated to be renamed to Bakachyk-Kyiat, which is a Ukrainian transliteration of the town's name in the language of the Crimean Tatars who are indigenous to Crimea. However, since Crimea has been occupied by Russia, the law enacting the renaming did not come into effect. It was scheduled to come into effect when Ukrainian control of Crimea was re-established. In 2023, this clause was amended to remove the qualifier, instead making the new name official immediately.

== Demographics ==
As of the 2001 Ukrainian census, Komsomolske had a population of 4,271 people, who mostly self-reported their ethnic background as Russians and Ukrainians.
