= Hresivskyi =

Hresivskyi Гресівський
- Urban-type settlement
- Location within Crimea
- Coordinates: 45°00′35″N 34°01′33″E
- Country: Disputed: Ukraine (de jure); Russia (de facto)
- Region: (Autonomous Republic of Crimea) Crimea^{1}
- Municipality: Simferopol

Population
  - Total: 9,835
- Time zone: UTC+4 (MSK)
- ^{1} Autonomous Republic of Crimea (de jure) or Republic of Crimea (de facto), depending on jurisdiction.

Hresivskyi (Ukrainian: Гресівський; Crimean Tatar: Gresovskiy; Russian: Грэсовский, romanized: Gresovskiy) is an urban-type settlement located in Simferopol Municipality, Crimea. Population: 9,835 (2014 Census).

== Demographics ==
According to the 2001 census, 10,101 people lived in Hresivskyi. The language composition was as follows:

Language	Population	Percentage
Ukrainian	1051	10.4
Russian	8909	88.22
Crimean Tatar	45	0.45
Belarusian	12	0.12
Moldovan	5	0.05
Armenian	5	0.05
Bulgarian	3	0.03
German	2	0.02
Polish	2	0.02
Jewish	1	0.01

== See also ==
- Simferopol Municipality
