= Zaliznychnyi District, Simferopol =

Zaliznychnyi District
- Urban district in Simferopol
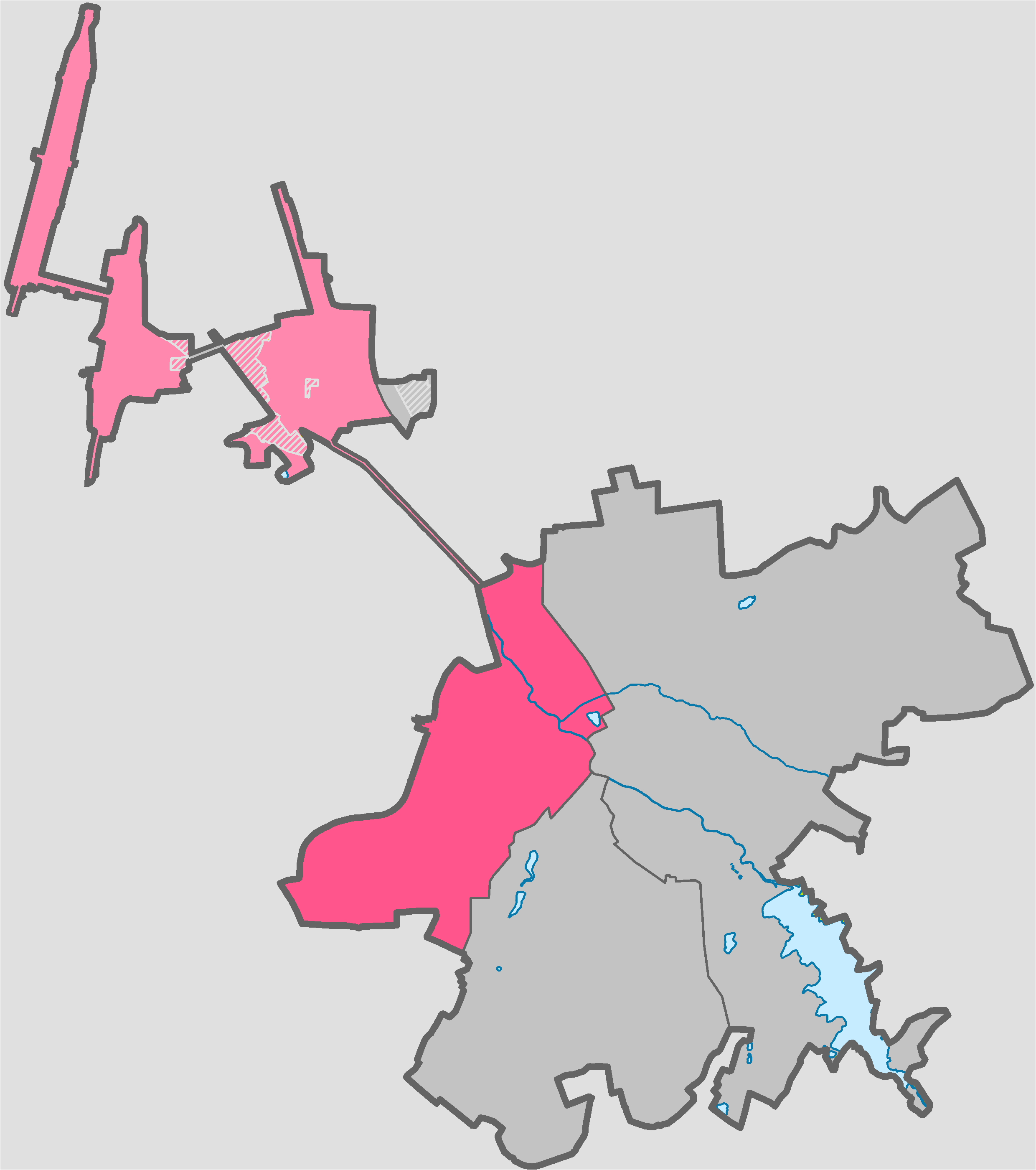
- Coordinates: 44°57′02″N 34°06′21″E
- Country: Disputed: Ukraine (de jure); Russia (de facto)
- Region: (Autonomous Republic of Crimea) Crimea^{1}
- Municipality: Simferopol

Area
  - Total: 24 km^{2} (9.3 sq mi)

Population
  - Total: 78,022
- Time zone: UTC+4 (MSK)
- ^{1} Autonomous Republic of Crimea (de jure) or Republic of Crimea (de facto), depending on jurisdiction.

Zaliznychnyi District (Ukrainian: Залізничний район; Russian: Железнодорожный район) is an administrative raion (district) of the city of Simferopol. Population: 78,022 (2014 Census).

== See also ==
- Simferopol Municipality
