= Central District, Simferopol =

Central District
- Urban district in Simferopol
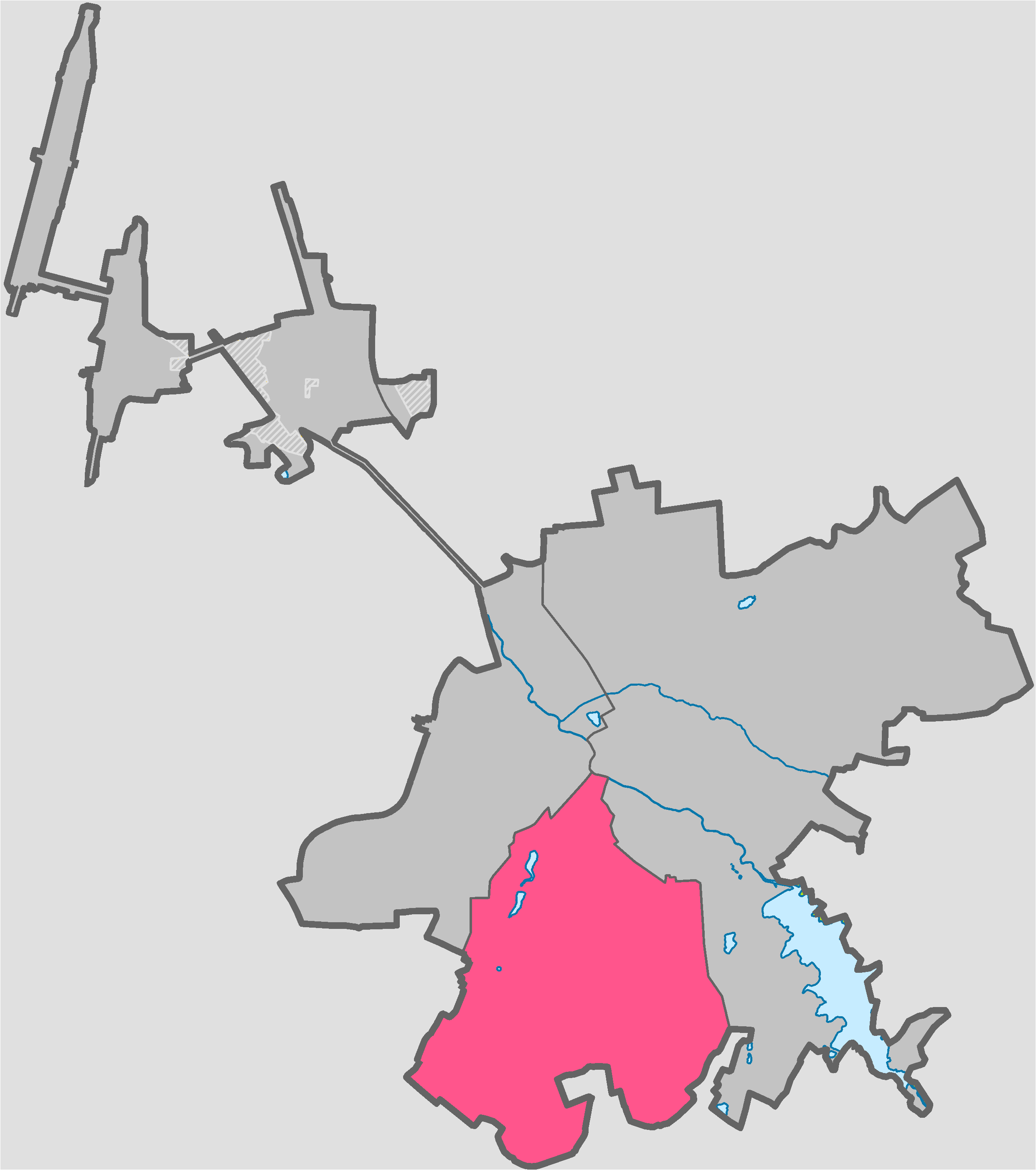
- Coordinates: 44°55′11″N 34°05′45″E
- Country: Disputed: Ukraine (de jure); Russia (de facto)
- Region: (Autonomous Republic of Crimea) Crimea^{1}
- Municipality: Simferopol

Area
  - Total: 189 km^{2} (73 sq mi)

Population
  - Total: 99,700
- Time zone: UTC+4 (MSK)
- ^{1} Autonomous Republic of Crimea (de jure) or Republic of Crimea (de facto), depending on jurisdiction.

Central District (Ukrainian: Центральний район, romanized: Tsentralnyi raion; Russian: Центральный район, romanized: Tsentralnyy rayon) is an administrative raion (district) of the city of Simferopol. Population: 99,700 (2014 Census).

== See also ==
- Simferopol Municipality
