= Çelebi =

Turkish title and derived names

Çelebi (Turkish pronunciation: [tʃeleˈbi], Ottoman Turkish: چلبی) was an Ottoman title of respect, approximately corresponding to "gentleman", "well-mannered" or "courteous". Çelebi also means "man of God", as an i-suffixed derivative from çalab (Turkish pronunciation: [tʃaˈɫap]), which means "God" in Ottoman Turkish. German linguist and Turkologist Marcel Erdal, citing Baron Tiesenhausen, traces çalab back to Arabic djellaba "importer, trader, merchant" > "high social positions"; jallāb is derived from root j-l-b "to have brought, to import", ultimately from West Semitic root g-l-b "to catch, to fetch".

== List of notable people ==
=== Title ===
Notable people with the title include, in approximate chronological order:

- Gazi Çelebi, early 14th-century Turkish pirate and ruler of the Black Sea port of Sinop
- The sons of Ottoman sultan Bayezid I, who fought one another for the throne in the Ottoman Interregnum of 1402 to 1413:
  - İsa Çelebi (1380–1406)
  - Musa Çelebi (died 1413)
  - Mehmed Çelebi (1390–1421), who won the civil war, being crowned sultan Mehmed I
  - Mustafa Çelebi (1393–1422)
  - Süleyman Çelebi (1377–1411)
- Suzi Çelebi of Prizren (betw. 1455–1465 – 1524), Ottoman epic poet
- Nishandji Tadji-zade Dja'fer Çelebi (Nişancı Tâcı-Zâde Câ’fer Çelebi; 1459–1515), Ottoman statesman and a diwan poet
- Hoca Çelebi (1490–1574), Ottoman Grand Mufti
- Seydi Ali Reis (1498–1563), or Sidi Ali Ben Hossein, Ottoman admiral and nautical writer.
- Kınalızâde Ali Çelebi (1510/11?–1572), Ottoman jurist and writer
- Aşık Çelebi (1520–1572), Ottoman poet and biographer
- Kınalızâde Hasan Çelebi (1546–1604), Ottoman poet and bibliographer, son of Kınalızâde Ali Çelebi
- Kinalizâde Fehmi Çelebi (1564–1596), Ottoman poet, son of Kınalızâde Ali Çelebi
- Anton Çelebi (1604–1674), Armenian merchant magnate, Ottoman and Tuscan official
- Abro Chelebi (died 1676), Armenian merchant, Ottoman army purveyor
- Hezârfen Ahmed Çelebi (1609–1640), alleged Ottoman aviator and polymath, brother of Lagâri Hasan Çelebi
- Lagâri Hasan Çelebi, alleged 17th-century Ottoman aviator (rocketeer; 1633 flight) and polymath, brother of Hezârfen Ahmed
- Katip Çelebi (1609–1657), Ḥājjī Khalīfa, Ottoman polymath and encyclopedist
- Evliya Çelebi (1611–1682), Ottoman explorer and travel writer
- Eremia Chelebi (1637–1695), Ottoman Armenian intellectual and travel writer
- Yirmisekiz Mehmed Çelebi (c. 1670–1732), Ottoman statesman
- Seyit Settar Çelebi (1789-in/after 1849), namesake of Seyit-Settar Mosque, Simferopol, Crimea

==== Seljuk & Ottoman Sufi family ====
Çelebi is a family of descendants of Rumi (13th-century Persian poet and Sufi mystic), who established and led the Sufi Mevlevi Order ("the whirling dervishes") for over 700 years

=== Surname (post-Ottoman) ===
- Alpay Çelebi (born 1999), Turkish footballer
- Asaf Halet Çelebi (1907–1958), Turkish poet
- Hasan Çelebi (1937–2025), Turkish calligraphist
- Huseyin Çelebî (1967–1992), Kurdish activist and writer
- Merve Çelebi (born 1993), Turkish-Cypriot volleyball player
- Nilgün Çelebi (born 1950), Turkish academic

=== As part of surname ===
- Âmil Çelebioğlu (1934–1990), Turkish researcher and professor
- Sergiu Celibidache (1912–1996), Romanian conductor, born Celebidachi

== See also ==
- Çelebi (tribe), prominent Kurdish tribe inhabiting the Mardin Province of southeastern Turkey
- Celebic (disambiguation)
- Čelebići (disambiguation)
- Chalabi (surname)
- Cilibi Moise (1812–1870), Jewish Romanian humourist whose nickname was derived from Turkish çelebi
- List of Ottoman titles and appellations
