= Chalabi =

Chalabi may refer to:

- Chalabi, Armenia, a town
- Chalabi, Iran (disambiguation), various locations
- Chalabi (surname), including a list of people with the surname
- Chalabi Jews, Jews originating from Aleppo, also known as Halabi Jews

== See also ==
- Çelebi
- Eugenio Calabi (1923–2023), an Italian-born American mathematician
