= İsa Necati =

Ottoman poet (died 1509)

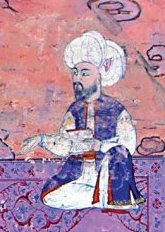
Miniature of İsa Necati

İsa Necati (died 1509), usually referred to as Necati or Nejati, was an Ottoman poet, and the first great lyric poet of Ottoman Turkish literature. Considered an original and eloquent poet, he won the praises of his contemporaries and later Turkish writers, securing for himself an important place in Turkish literary history.

== Life ==
Not much is known about his origin and youth. It is agreed that he was born a slave in Edirne. His names İsa (Jesus) and Necati (who escaped from danger / found refuge) indicate a non-Muslim and non-Turkish ancestry, although contemporary biographers (tezkire writers) do not mention it. It seems that he had already made a name for himself in Edirne and managed to purchase his freedom. At a young age he went to Kastamonu where he developed his skill in calligraphy and poetry. Around 1480, he went to Constantinople, where he wrote poetry for Sultan Mehmed II and made powerful friends. In one story, one of the Sultan's companions named Yurgi or Chiyurgi, said by some to have been a Greek from Trabzon, took some of Necati's ghazels with him when he went to play chess with the Sultan. The introduction was crucial; the Sultan was pleased with Necati's work and appointed him katib in the Ottoman Imperial Council. After the accession of Sultan Bayezid II in 1481, Necati briefly entered the service of one of his sovereign's sons, Prince Abdullah. Together with his friend Sehi Bey, he served as katib (secretary) to Prince Şehzade Mahmud, son of Bayezid II. After the death of Prince Mahmud (1507 or 1508), Necati refused any further appointments and lived in retirement in Constantinople until his death on 17 March 1509.

== Poetry ==
He was considered by contemporary and later bibliographers to be one of the greatest of his epoch. Apart from a few scattered lines from the many pieces attributed to Necati, the only extant work is his Dīvān ("Collection of Poems"), in which there are numerous examples of his graceful and refined verse.

His Gül Kasîdesi (Rose Qasida) is one of the only eight qasidas dedicated to Bayezid II, but the occasion is unknown, though it should have come during the early Bayezid reign. It is a Bahariye, or spring qasida.

Necati was well versed in Persian and Turkish; however, his works are considered less influenced by Persian literature than other poets before him.

== See also ==
- Kastamonulu Latifî Çelebi
