= Halıcı =

Origin
- Language: Turkish
- Meaning: carpet weaver; carpet trader, carpet seller
- Region of origin: Turkey

Halıcı (IPA: [haˈlɯdʒɯ]) or Halici is a Turkish surname. It is derived from the Turkish noun of Persian origin halı (cf. Persian: قالی (qâli)) with the meaning "carpet" by adding the Turkish agentive suffix -cı and originally denoted a person either weaving or selling carpets or rugs. Notable people with the surname include:

- Mehdi Halıcı (1927–2008), Turkish novelist
- Nevin Halıcı (born 1941), Turkish writer
