= Sehi Bey =

Ottoman poet and bibliographer (c. 1471–1548)

Sehi Bey (Ottoman Turkish: Sehî Bey), (1471?–1548) was an Ottoman poet and bibliographer. He was the first to compile a tezkire (bibliographical dictionary of poets and poetry), a genre which would have many followers until the 19th century.

Sehi Bey was born in Edirne. Together with his friend, the poet Necati (d.1509), he served as katib (secretary) to Princes Şehzade Mahmud, son of Bayezid II, and Süleyman, the latter would become known as Suleiman the Magnificent. He was in charge of many waqfs located in Edirne and Ergene, being a chief trustee, in Turkish mütevelli.
He is mostly remembered for the tezkire, Heşt Behişt (Eight Springs), which he finished in 1538. 2 other editions would follow until 1548. It narrated the work and life of 241 poets and was very well received and supported by the Ottoman high social circles. It served as basic source for later study of Ottoman poetry.

Sehi Bey also worked on his own poetry, collected in a diwan.
He died in 1548 (955 in Islamic calendar).

== See also ==
- Aşık Çelebi
- Kastamonulu Latifî Çelebi
- Ahdi of Baghdad
