= Čelebić (surname) =

Čelebić (Serbian Cyrillic: Челебић, pronounced [tʃelěbiːtɕ]) is a Serbo-Croatian surname, derived from Turkish çelebi, approximately meaning "gentleman". Notable people with the surname include:

- Gojko Čelebić (born 1958), Montenegrin writer and diplomat
- Nikola Čelebić (born 1989), Montenegrin footballer
- Ljubomir Čelebić (born 1991), Montenegrin tennis player
- Sead Čelebić (born 1956), former Bosnian footballer

== See also ==
- Celebic (disambiguation)
- Čelebići (disambiguation)
