= Celebi =

Celebi may refer to:

- Çelebi, an Ottoman title of respect
- Celebi, a fictional Pokémon species
