= Khālid al-Kātib =

Abbasid poet

Khālid al-Kātib (d. 269-270 AH /883–884 AD) was a prolific Khurasani poet who lived in Baghdad.

Khālid al-Kātib is best known for his association with prince Ibrahim b. al-Mahdi, who was a great admirer of Khālid’s work and once gifted him a house. Khālid’s literary legacy consists of more than 500 poems, many of which are addressed to male beloveds, and is regarded as a specialist of the four-line ghazal (love poem), which are the majority of his work. His most famous poetic motif was the line, "Night for the lover has no end".

The Cambridge History describes Khāled al-Kātib as “a functionary in the Abbasid administration and author of a large number of love poems of four lines.” He is noted as unusual in composing love poetry exclusively in homoerotic form, unlike most poets who addressed both sexes. He is contrasted with the Abbasid prince Ibn al-Muʿtazz, who wrote ghazal addressed to both men and women.

== Life and career ==
He made his living as a katib (secretary) in the army. During his time in the army, Khālid was a nadim (drinking companion) to high-ranking officials like the general 'Alī b. Hisham and the Christian al-Fadl b. Marwan. He also maintained a complex relationship with the famous poet Abū Tammām, who was described by biographical sources as both an admirer of Khālid al-Kātib’s verses about the night and a potential adversary. Although he interacted with high level Abbasid nobles and caliphs, including al-Ma'mūn and al-Mu'taşim, he often faced financial difficulties and never amassed wealth that reflected his status as a great poet of his era. Later in his life, Khālid was famously afflicted with madness, a condition some sources suggest was brought on by the pain of separation from a beloved while he was on a military assignment in Syria.

Khālid came into contact with multiple wealthy patrons in his poetic career. When his friend al-Fadl b. Marwan sent his poem to caliph al-Mu’tasim, Khālid started socializing with Al-Mu’tasim and other high ranking officials including princes and other caliphs. Khālid had a special relationship with Ibrahim b. al-Mahdi, Khālid’s biggest patron for his poetry. Ibrahim Al-Mahdi was noted for being brought to tears after hearing Khālid’s poetry then gave him 350 dinars as a reward. Al-Madhi would later donate some money to Khālid to help him afford housing and food when he was financially struggling.

Based on several accounts, Khālid al-Kātib developed a peculiar reputation due to habits and tendencies. He was infamous for having many adversaries and had public feuds through poetry. In one prominent feud, he was so aloof that was given the nickname “cold Khālid” by one of his rivals Abu Tammam in a scathing poem. As a result of the poem, he faced incessant bullying from young kids calling him “cold Khālid” Khālid was unfortunately known to have struggled with mental illness and obsession in his late years. As by his poetry he also developed a reputation for being a hopeless romantic in his interactions with men (predominantly the subject of his poetry) and with women sometimes.

=== Finances ===
Caliph al-Muʿtaṣim reportedly granted him 4,000–5,000 dirhams for a poem on the new capital Sāmarrāʾ. Ibrāhīm b. al-Mahdī gave him 350 dinars for two short poems and a witty remark, with Khālid using the sum to purchase a house. Prince ʿAlī b. al-Muʿtaṣim gave him 50 dinars after a court recitation. Caliph al-Rashīd also summoned him after hearing his verses sung by a jāriya (female entertainer).

=== Relationship with Abū Tammām ===
Both Khālid and Abū Tammām were prolific composers of homoerotic ghazal, frequently in four-line form. Abū Tammām wrote an invective against Khālid, calling him “cold Khālid” (Khālid al-bārid), which Gruendler interprets as possibly referring to “bland and insipid verse.” Khālid also wrote against Abū Tammām in a poem beginning “O beardless youths” (yā maʿshar al-murd), warning them away from him. On at least one occasion, Khālid added lines to a poem by Abū Tammām, suggesting moments of collegiality alongside rivalry. Khālid also composed a love poem addressed to ʿAbdallāh, who was likewise Abū Tammām’s beloved, provoking Abū Tammām’s invective.

== Poetry ==
Khālid al-Kātib was the author of more than 500 love poems; his dīwān (collection of poems) contains 576 poems according to Ṣādir and al-Sāmarrāʾī, and 582 according to Arazi. Except for five poems, all are ghazal referring to the beloved in grammatically masculine terms. Arazi interprets this exclusive use of masculine language to mean that “women are absent from Khālid's poetic universe.” He served as a kātib in the army and was not a major court panegyrist, never composing encomia for caliphs in exchange for large rewards.

=== Genre and form ===
Khālid wrote exclusively in the ghazal genre. Four-line poems predominate in his output, with the vast majority of his poems consisting of four lines. Bauer places Khālid on a spectrum of homoerotic ghazal: Abū Nuwās at one end (humorous and playful), Abū Tammām in the middle, and Khālid at the other extreme (serious and entirely non-humorous). Khālid refers to the beloved in grammatically masculine terms 100% of the time, compared to Abū Nuwās (60%) and Abū Tammām (90%). Bauer describes his love poetry as “devotional” in character. Seidensticker argues that Khālid's four-line Arabic ghazal may be a precursor to the Persian rubāʿiyya genre.

=== Motifs ===
Khālid’s most celebrated hemistich is: “Night for the lover has no end” (laylu l-muḥibbi bi-lā ākhir). He reportedly said he derived the idea after overhearing a blind beggar say, “Night and day are as one to me.” Abū Tammām praised this line, claiming Khālid surpassed al-Nābigha and Imruʾ al-Qays in their depictions of night with only half a line. In another account, Abū Tammām (incognito) recited verses by Imruʾ al-Qays, al-Nābigha, and Bashshār b. Burd before declaring Khālid superior and gifting him his mule. Ibn al-Muʿtazz’s Ṭabaqāt al-shuʿarāʾ opens its entry on Khālid by noting that Abū Tammām considered him one of three poets who wrote excellent verses on the night.

== Reception and critical opinions ==
Yāqūt's Muʿjam al-udabāʾ describes Khālid as “a famous poet whose poetry is elegant (raqīq).” Taʾrīkh Baghdād and Wafayāt al-aʿyān both note that his poetry was collected and that all of it is ghazal. The critic Diʿbil remarked that Khālid lacked the stamina for long qaṣīdas (formal poems) and should confine himself to four-line poems. His contemporaries Muḥammad b. ʿAbd al-Malik and Aḥmad b. ʿAbd al-Wahhāb similarly commented on the brevity of his poetry. His poetry was collected into a dīwān by Abū Bakr al-Ṣūlī (d. 335/946), though this version is now lost. Multiple manuscript copies survive, indicating the dīwān’s popularity.

== Legacy ==
Khālid al-Kātib is credited for being one of the early pioneers of the ruba’i. While it was previously assumed that Persians were responsible for creating the quatrain, research revealed that Khālid was one of the first 4 line aaaa or aaba rhyme schemes that is fundamental to the ruba’i. Khālid is also responsible for the famous motif “night for the lover has no end” as a vice way to describe heartache. Khālid has plenty of poetry that has the night as a common motif.

Throughout his lifetime, Khālid wrote 576 to 582 poems. His work was influential for popularizing the themes of love and heartbreak that are now common in the ruba’i. He is known for his earnest exploration of longing and desire in the ruba’i poetry. His poetry is also notable for frequently writing about queer love. Almost every poem he wrote references a male lover. Khālid al-Kātib became a significant figure in classical homoerotic poetry. Khālid’s poetry was well known for being fairly brief but still highly influential. Much of his poetry has been compiled in multiple literary compositions. Khālid’s poems have long since been valuable records or primary sources that help early Arab historians learn about poetry and even culture in the Arab world many years ago.

== Editions ==
Khālid al-Kātib’s dīwān has been the subject of several modern critical editions. However, the primary scholarly work many use to reference Khālid’s life and work is Albert Arazi’s 1990 edition.

- Albert Arazi (Paris, 1990) - Published in French by G.-P. Maisonneuve et Larose under the title Amour divin et amour profane dans I’Islam medieval: A travers le Dīwān de Khālid al-Kātib, translating to Divine and Profane Love in Medieval Islam through the Dīwān of Khālid al-Kātib. This critical edition draws from surviving manuscripts of Khālid’s dīwān, incorporating 582 poems.
- Yūnus Ahmad al-Sāmarrā’ī (Baghdad, 1981) - An earlier edition containing 576 poems.
- Kārīn Ṣādir (Damascus, 2006) - A later edition published in Syria.

During the medieval period, Abū Bakr al-Ṣūlī compiled Khālid’s dīwān, but it has since been lost. The existence and circulation of Khālid’s manuscripts within medieval society reflects the continuous popularity of his works and the reputation he upheld.

== Translations ==
Khālid al-Kātib’s dīwān has yet to be fully translated into English or any other Western language. Scholarship in English remains limited, mostly including mentions in passing. Notable exceptions include Bencheikh’s writing in the Encyclopedia of Islam and Jennifer Tobkin’s article in the Journal of Abbasid Studies, the first detailed study of Khālid al-Kātib in English.
