= Association of Students from Kurdistan =

The Association of Students from Kurdistan (German: Verband der Studierenden aus Kurdistan; Kurdish: Yekîtiya Xwendekarên Kurdistan), or YXK, is an umbrella organization of Kurdish students in Germany and Austria. Established 1991 at the Ruhr University Bochum, Germany, YXK is a legally registered association (eingetragener Verein) that is currently organized in twenty local chapters throughout Germany and Austria. Along with NAV-DEM and the youth organization Ciwanên Azad, it is one of the Kurdish diaspora organizations that the German Verfassungsschutz considers supportive of the Kurdistan Workers' Party (PKK).

== History and activities ==
YXK was founded at a conference of 75 students from 16 German universities and colleges on 12–13 Dezember 1991 at the Ruhr University Bochum. It annually awards the Hüseyin Çelebi Prize for Kurdish literature and holds annual Kurdish film festivals in Hamburg and Cologne. The biannual student magazine "Ronahî", named after the nom de guerre of German PKK militant Andrea Wolf, discusses the political situation of Kurds in both Germany and the four parts of Kurdistan, mainly Turkish Kurdistan and Rojava.

The organization is in good standing with oppositional Turkish diaspora organizations. Together with the Alevi community (Alevitische Gemeinde Deutschland) and Turkish socialist DIDF, YXK co-organized the May 2014 mass protests in Cologne, where some 50.000 protesters gathered to protest against Turkish President Recep Tayyip Erdoğan (German: Wir sagen Nein zu Erdoğan, lit. 'We're saying No to Erdoğan').

In a joint fundraising campaign Solidarität mit Rojava YXK and German anticapitalist organization Interventionistische Linke (IL), collected some 100.000 Euro to support Syrian Kurdish People's Protection Units (YPG).
