= Abu'l-Hasan Ali Rayhani =

Abu'l-Hasan Ali Rayhani (died c. 834) was an Iranian author, bureaucrat and poet, who served as a high ranking civil secretary (katib) under the Abbasid caliph al-Mamun (r. 813–833).

== Sources ==
- Zakeri, Mohsen (2021). "Abu'l-Ḥasan ʿAli Rayḥāni". In Yarshater, Ehsan (ed.). Encyclopædia Iranica (Online ed.). Encyclopædia Iranica Foundation.
