= Ahdi =

Ahdi may refer to:

- Ahdi, Pakistan, a village in Punjab, Pakistan
- Ahdi of Baghdad, poet and bibliographer of the 16th century
