= Chalbi =

Chalbi may refer to:

- Chalbi Desert, in Kenya
- Chalbi, Iran (disambiguation), places in Iran
