= Tâcîzâde Cafer Çelebi =

Ottoman statesman and diwan poet

Nişancı Tâcîzâde Cafer Çelebi or Nīshāndji Tādji-Zādah Djā'far Chālabī (c. 1459–1515), known for short as Câ’fer Çelebi or Jā’far Chālabī was an Ottoman statesman and a diwan poet.

== Life ==
He was born in Amasya in about 1459 (864 in Ottoman calendar). His father Tād̲j̲ī Beg served as adviser to Prince Bāyezīd, who would become Sultan Bayezid I later. After rising in the theological career to müderris, Sultan Bayezid II appointed him Nishandji and Kazaskerin 1497 or 1498.
His life trajectory was interrupted by the struggle for power between Şehzade Ahmet and his brother Selim, who would become later Sultan Selim I. Suspected of favoring Şehzade Ahmet in the struggle for the succession, Djaʿfer Çelebi, together with other of Aḥmet’s partisans, was accused of military disobedience and executed in 1515, right after the return of Ahmad's brother and rival from the campaign in Iran.

He is known for his masnavi.

== Some of his works ==
- Hevesname
- Mahruse-i İstanbul Fetihnamesi
- Münşeat
- Diwan (A collection of Turkish and Persian poems)
