= 1990 Mecca tunnel tragedy =

Crowd crush incident

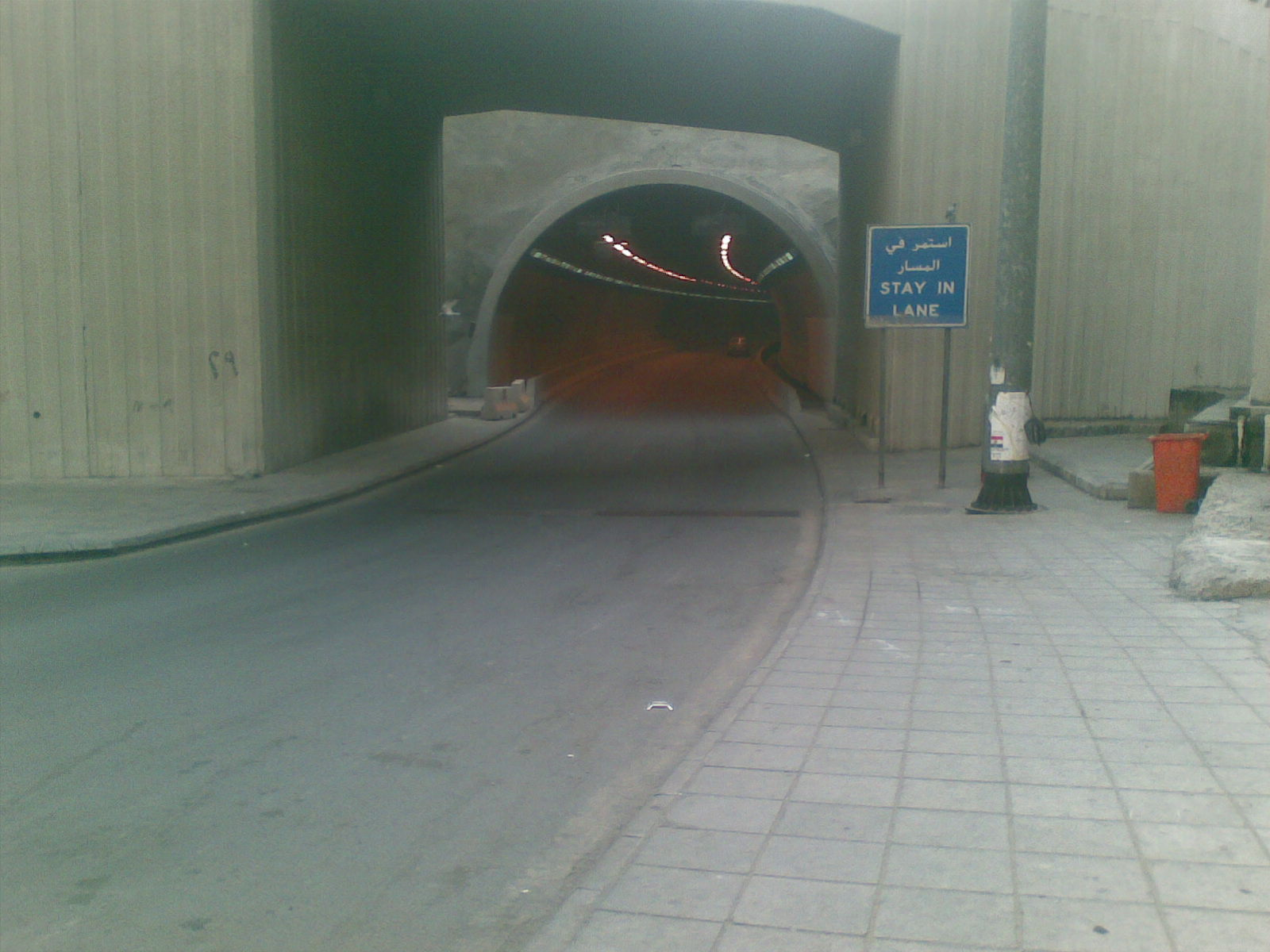
- Tunnel where the crush took place
- Date: 3 July 1990
- Location: Mina, Mecca, Saudi Arabia
- Deaths: 1,426

On 2 July 1990, 1,426 people were suffocated and trampled to death in a crowd crush or stampede event in a tunnel near Mecca during the annual Hajj pilgrimage in Saudi Arabia.

== Event ==
The incident occurred inside a 550-meter-long (1,800 ft) and 10-meter-wide (33 ft) pedestrian tunnel (tunnel Al-Ma'aisim) leading out from Mecca towards Mina and the Plains of Arafat. The tunnel had been worked on as part of a $15-billion project around Mecca's holy sites started two years earlier by the Saudi government.

While pilgrims were traveling to perform the ritual Stoning of the Devil at 10:00 a.m., the disaster started when a pedestrian bridge railing was bent, causing seven people to fall off a bridge and onto people exiting the tunnel. The tunnel's capacity of 1,000 soon filled with as many as 5,000 people. With outside temperature at 44 °C (111 °F), a failure of the tunnel's ventilation system was also blamed for many of the deaths. Some witnesses claimed they believed a demonstration was occurring; others reported that the power to the tunnel was deactivated. Saudi officials concluded that crowd hysteria occurring from the falling pilgrims was the cause.

Many who died were of Malaysian, Indonesian and Pakistani origin. According to one Malaysian account, 80 percent of the deaths occurred outside the tunnel, and 20 percent (about 285) inside. Among the victims was Âmil Çelebioğlu, a professor of Turkish literature and language.

== Reactions ==
Immediately after the event, King Fahd stated that the event was "God's will, which is above everything", adding that "had they not died there, they would have died elsewhere and at the same predestined moment". About 680 of those who died were Indonesians, and Indonesian officials criticized the Saudi government, saying it "cannot run from the responsibility for the tunnel disaster simply saying it was an act of God". Iran also expressed concerns after the incident, and Turkey issued a brief complaint. Calls for an international investigation were rejected by the Saudis.
