= Suzi Çelebi Mosque =

Ottoman-era mosque in Prizren, Kosovo

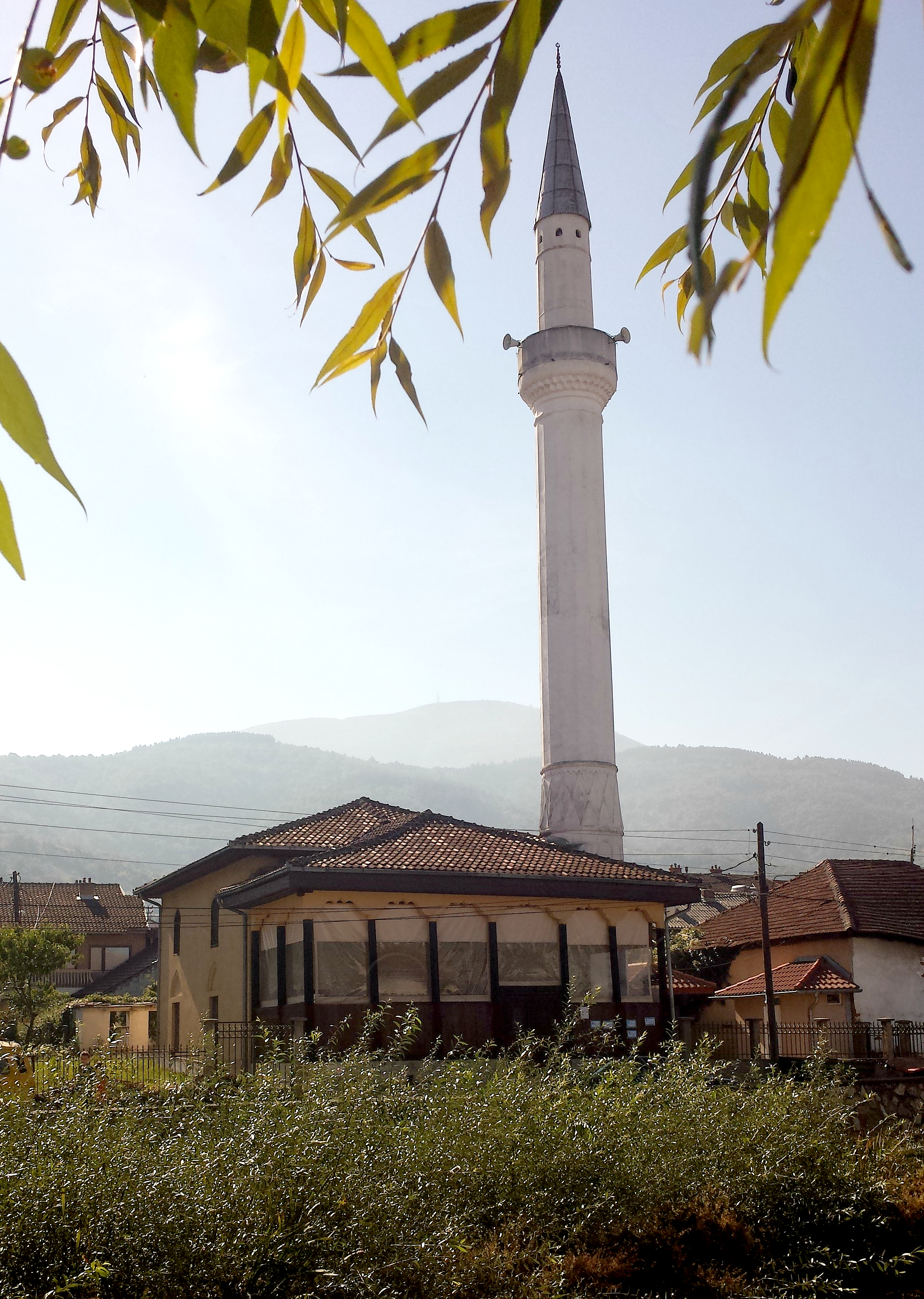

- Suzi Çelebi Mosque within Kosovo

Religion
- Affiliation: Sunni Islam
- District: District of Prizren

Location
- Location: Prizren
- Country: Kosovo
- Interactive map of Suzi Çelebi Mosque
- Coordinates: 42°12′34″N 20°44′2″E

Architecture
- Completed: 1523; 503 years ago

The Suzi Çelebi Mosque (Albanian: Xhamia e Suzi Çelebiut) is an Ottoman-era mosque in Prizren, Kosovo.

The mosque was built in 1523, and is the second earliest Islamic building in the city of Prizren and the first complete example of Islamic architecture there. It has a rectangular plan with a four-bay roof covered with tiles. Its roof is raised on eleven wooden pillars and covered with a triangular roof. A capital decorated with arched shapes is made on the wooden pillars. In the courtyard of the mosque are the old cemeteries of the city's Muslim priests. There is also the cemetery where Suzi Çelebiu and his brother, Nehari bin Abdullah, are buried, both of whom are recognized among the first poets of Prizren.

== See also ==
- Architecture of Kosovo
- Islam in Kosovo
- Religion in Kosovo
