= Latifî =

Ottoman poet and bibliographer (1491–1582)

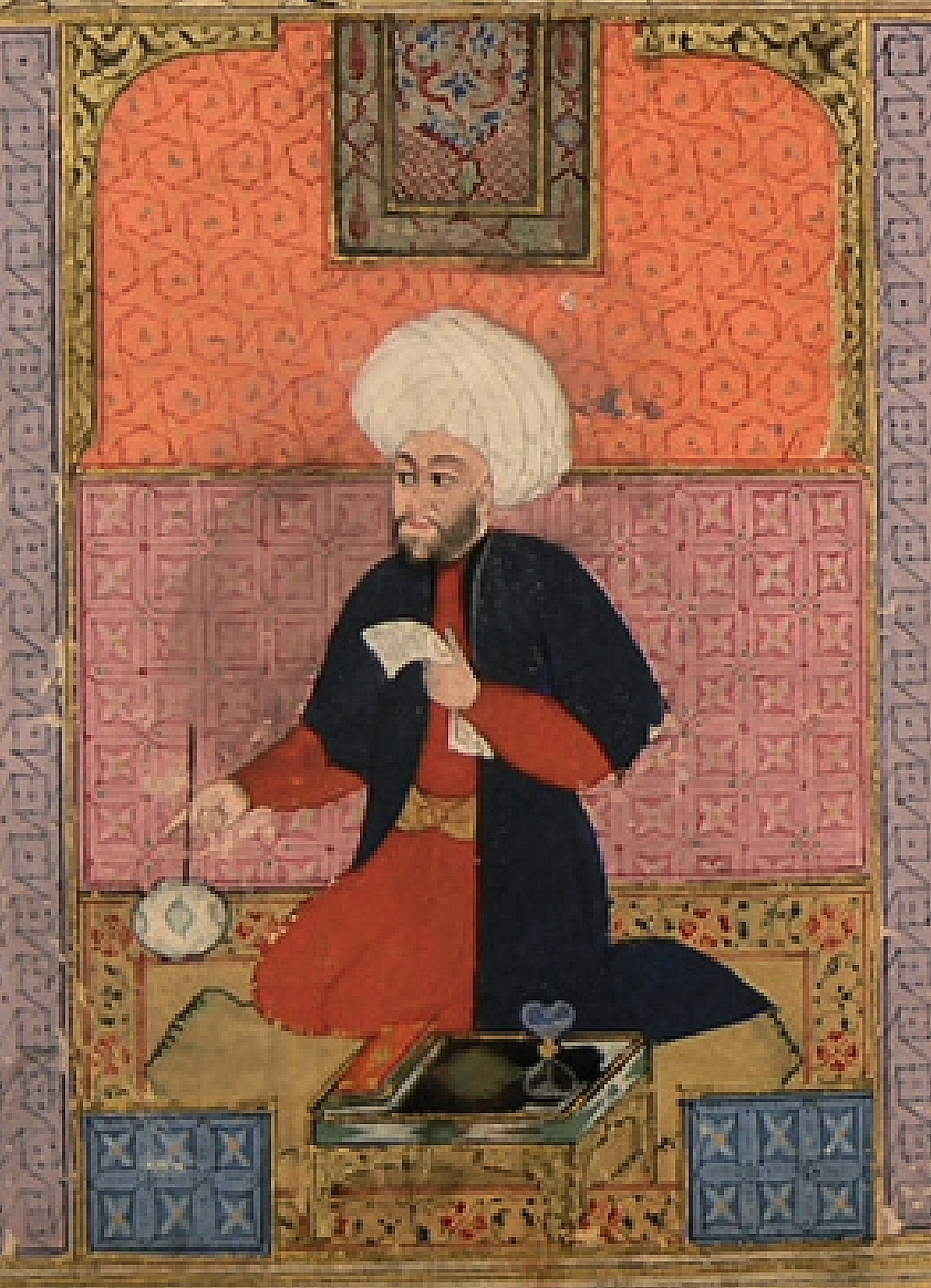
Latıfı (detail). From Mesâ’irü’ssu’arâ, Asık Çelebi, late 16th or early 17th century, Istanbul Millet Library, A. E. Tarih 772, fol.41a

Latifî (1491–1582), or Kastamonulu Latifî Çelebi, was an Ottoman poet and bibliographer. Born in Kastamonu, in northern Anatolia, he became famous for his tezkire Tezkiretü'ş-Şuara (Memoirs of the Poets), the second Ottoman collection of bibliographical data on poets and poetry overall.

Latifî was born Abdüllatif Hatibzâde into a notable family in Kastamonu and was educated there. He worked as an accountant and katib (secretary) in various vakifs (pious foundation), including Belgrade, Constantinople, Rhodes, and Egypt.
His major work was Tezkiretü'ş-Şuara (Memoirs of the Poets), which was the second tezkire in chronological order after that of Sehi Bey. It is also the one with the most extant copies, 91 in total. The tezkire was organized in three sections with an introduction. It narrated the life and work of around 300 poets of the period from the reign of Murad II (reigned between 1421 and 1451) until 1543, and was finished and presented it to Sultan Suleiman the Magnificent in 1546. The Sultan was so pleased that he appointed Latifi as a secretary at the "Ayyub al-Ansari" complex endowment. According to Aşık Çelebi's work Senses of Poets (Meşairü'ş-Şuara), the poet wrote it mostly during the era of Suleiman, but presented it to Murad III in 1574 after making minor changes to the introduction.
Another of his important works was Evsaf-ı İstanbul (Qualities of Istanbul) written in 1525. It gives a historical overview of the city of Istanbul, intertwined with geographical data, and information on the city's neighborhoods, architecture, and social life.

Latifi spent the last years of his life in Istanbul. He drowned when the ship he was traveling on to Yemen sank in the Red Sea.

== See also ==
- Ahdi of Baghdad
- Diwan poetry
