= Old Simferopol =

Old Simferopol Eski şeer
- Area of Simferopol
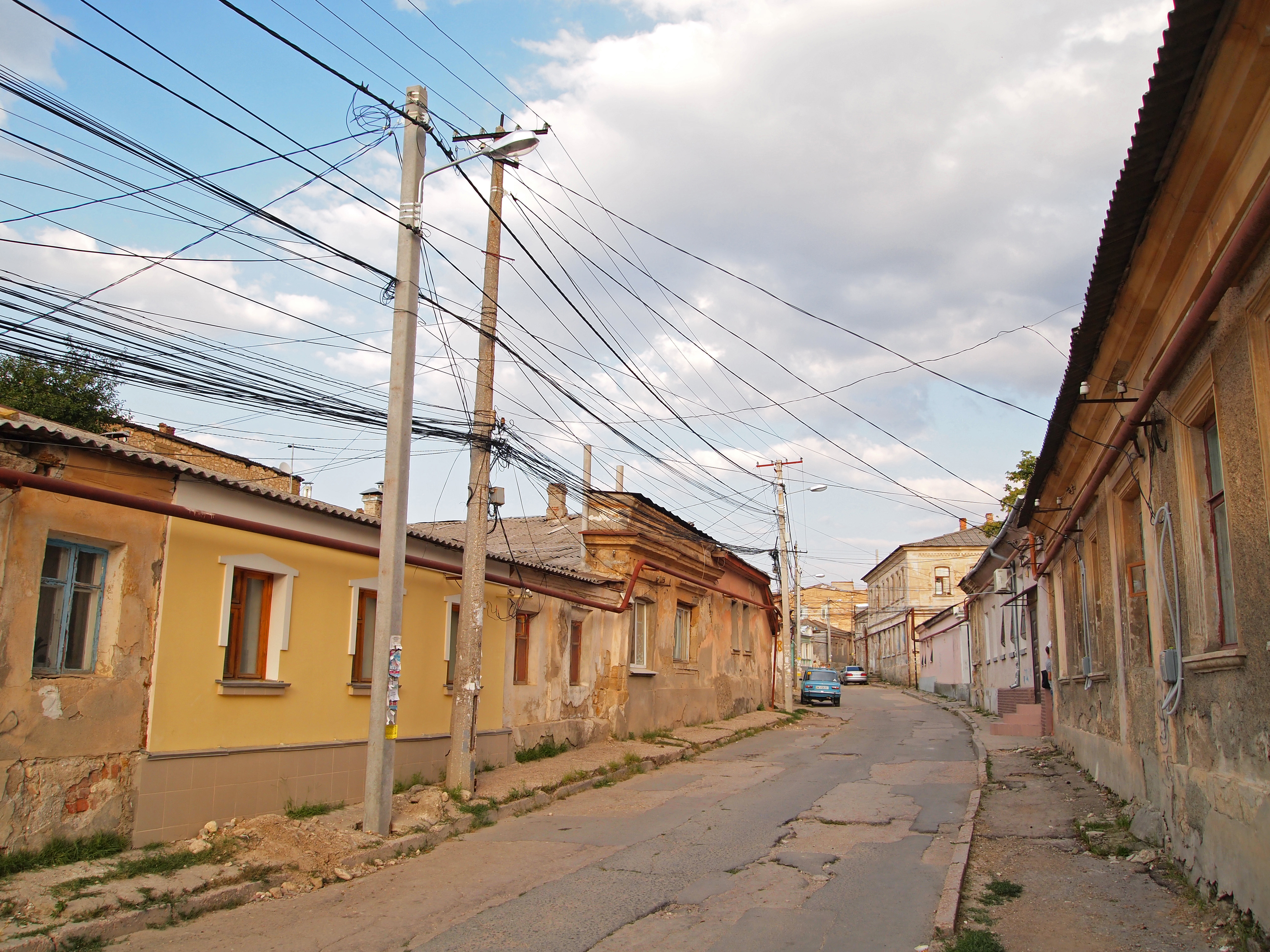
- Street in Old Simferopol

- Location within Crimea
- Coordinates: 44°56′51″N 34°06′28″E
- Country: Ukraine
- Administrative division: Autonomous Republic of Crimea
- City: Simferopol
- District: Kyivskyi

Population (2019)
  - Total: approx. 50,000

Old Simferopol, known locally as the Old Town (Crimean Tatar: Eski şeer, Ukrainian: Старе місто), is an area of the city of Simferopol which until the end of the 18th century served as the centre of the city of Krym . The old town consists of narrow, short streets constructed in a traditional Turkic style. In the 19th century it was also referred to by travellers as the "Asian town" because of the contrast with Simferopol's other regular, European-style neighbourhoods. Today, some of the neighbouring 19th-century, single-storey, European-style buildings are also considered to be part of the old town. The area is bounded by Lenin, Sevastopol's'ka, Krylov, and Chervonoarmiis'ka streets. The population of the old town is approximately 50,000.

The Old Town is unique in Simferopol for its preserved historic architecture and layout. In the 1950s-1970s, many film studios in the Soviet Union used Old Simferopol as a set for films set in historical provincial towns.

== History ==
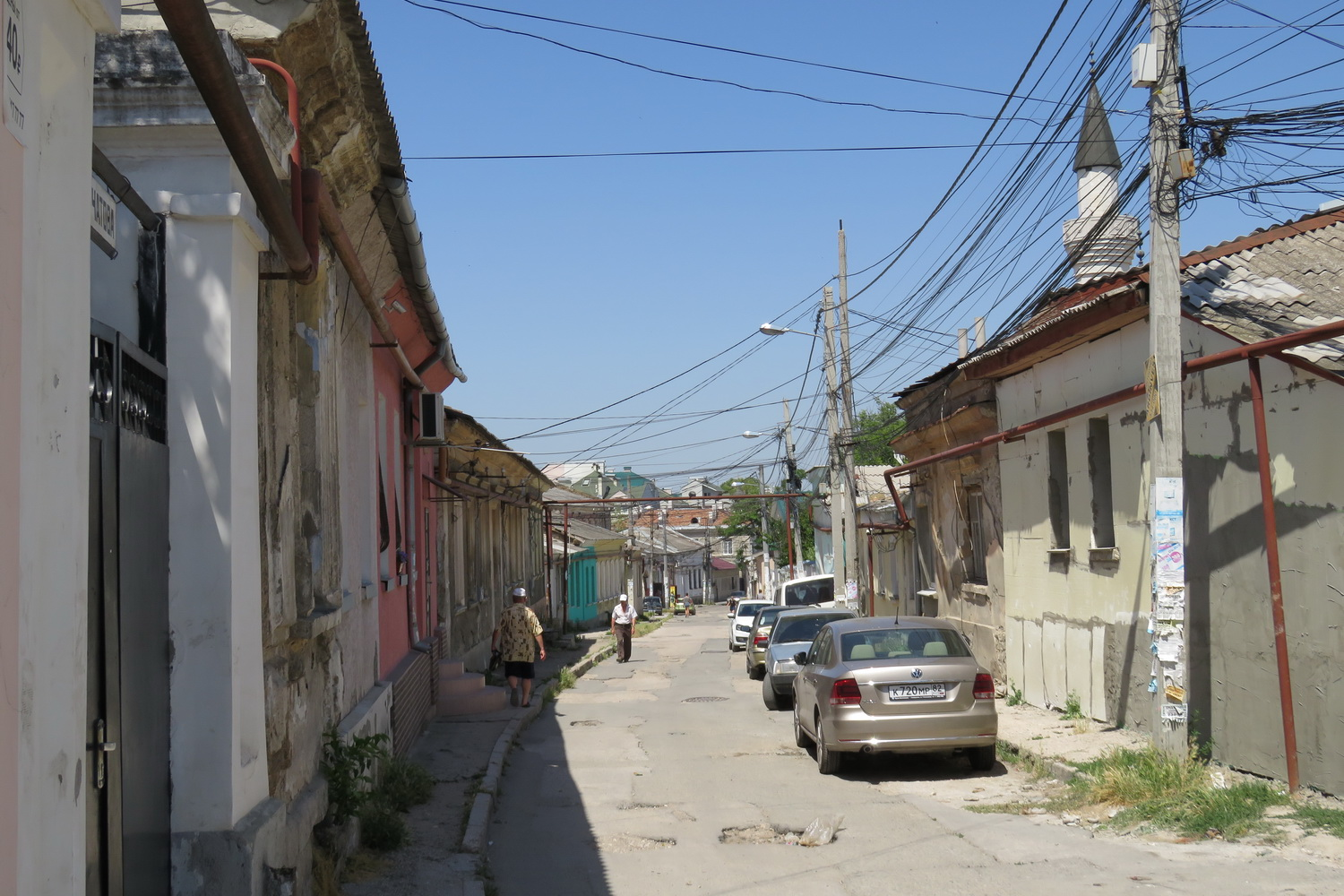
Single-storey buildings on Kurchatova Street, Old Town, Simferopol in 2016

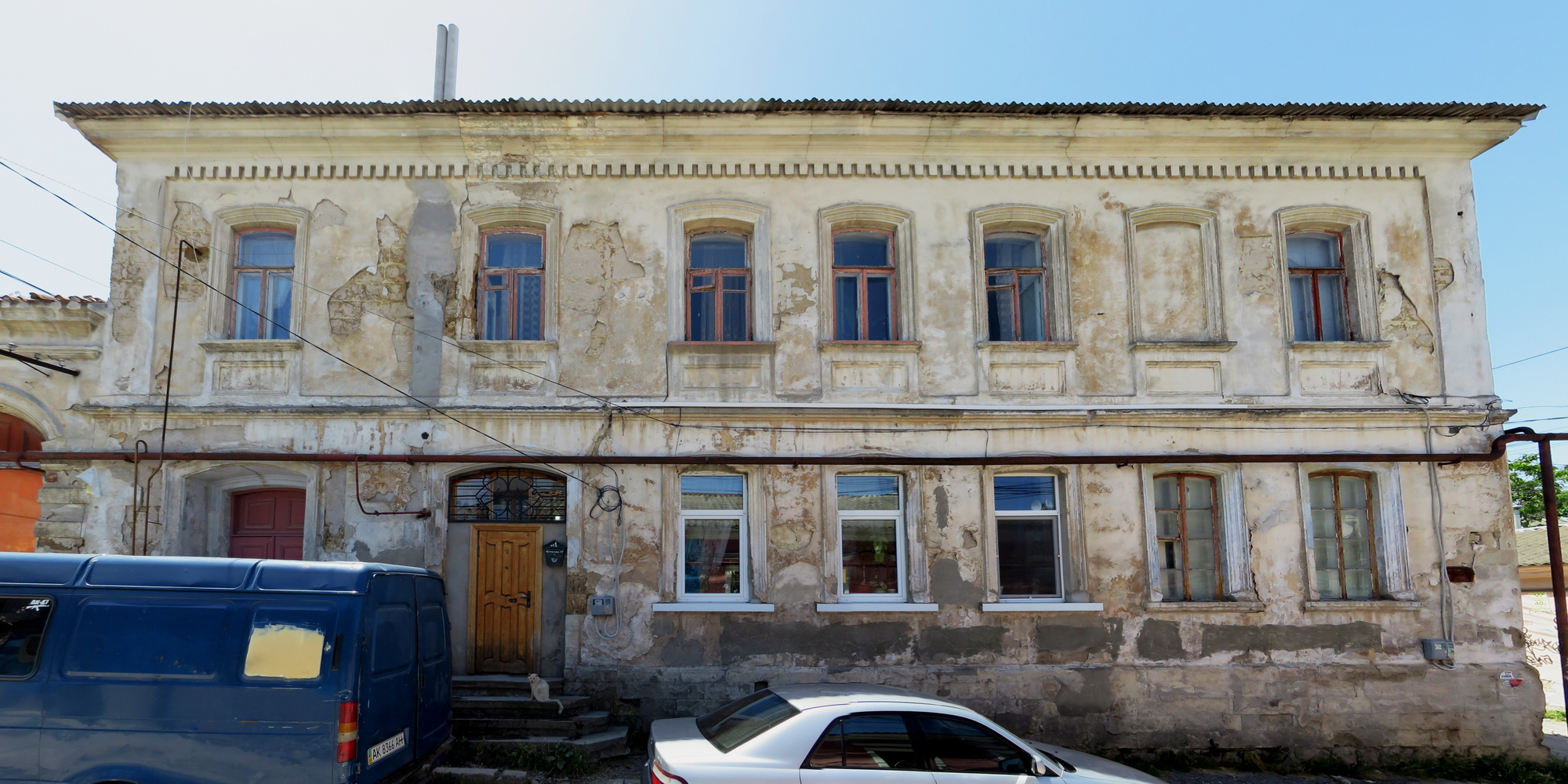
Two-storey building on Kurchatova Street in 2016

The modern-day old town is located on the site of the Crimean Tatar town of Aqmescit, which later became part of Simferopol after the city was founded. (Note: The city of Simferopol continues to be known as Aqmescit in the Crimean Tatar language.) Kebir-Jami, the settlement's main mosque, was built in 1508 from grey-white limestone, which gave the city the name of Aqmescit (in Crimean Tatar, literally "white mosque"). By 1783 there were 308 houses in the town (of which 84 had been partially destroyed by Russian Imperial forces under the leadership of Burkhard Christoph von Münnich in 1736), seven mosques, three maktabs, and one madrassa.

Most houses at that time were single-storey buildings made of clay mortar, with tiled roofs. The different blocks were curved in shape and separated from each other by narrow streets and numerous cul de sacs. In two-storey buildings, the ground floor was set aside for commercial and non-personal use. It is assumed that the street layout was designed to confuse an invading army in the event of an invasion, causing them to get lost in the maze of streets.

Drinking water for the town was taken from springs on the eastern slopes of Scythian Neapolis. 18th-century Prussian traveller Peter Simon Pallas later described the town's water source as follows:

Originally, the town was served by an underground water supply, which originated in a spring located three versts from the city, near the Bakhchysarai road.

Following the Annexation of the Crimean Khanate by the Russian Empire in 1783, it was decided to move the capital of Taurida Oblast (encompassing the majority of the lands of the annexed Crimean Khanate) from the city of Karasubazar (Note: Since renamed in 1944 to Bilohirsk.) to the town of Aqmescit. Simferopol proper is considered to have been founded in 1784. In the minutes of a meeting of Taurida Oblast's government, it is noted that "from Aqmescit, the local capital city of Simferopol will be created." In 1784, under the leadership of Prince Grigory Potemkin, work began on administrative and residential buildings as well as an Orthodox church in the area north-west of Kebir-Jami Mosque. The border between the city blocks constructed under the Crimean Khanate and those constructed under the Russian Empire runs approximately along the modern-day Karaimskaia, Kavkazskaia, and Proletarskaia streets.

At the turn of the 20th century, the Old Town was home primarily to a Jewish, Crimean Karaite, Crimean Tatar, Roma, Greek, and Armenian population.

In 1927, a cinema named after Turkish revolutionary Mustafa Subhi was opened to serve the local Crimean Tatar population. (Note: Following the deportation of the Crimean Tatars in 1944, the cinema was renamed "Rodina", Russian for "homeland".)

From 1941 to 1944, the city of Simferopol was occupied by Nazi Germany. This period was characterised by massacres against the civilian population, in particular the Jewish and Roma populations of the Old Town.

In April 1944, the Red Army regained control of Simferopol. In May, Soviet leader Joseph Stalin ordered the deportation of the Crimean Tatars to Central Asia as collective punishment for perceived pro-Nazi collaboration. The deportation was supervised by Lavrentiy Beria and was concentrated particularly in the predominantly-Tatar area of the Old Town.

After the collapse of the Soviet Union in 1991, Old Simferopol became part of newly-independent Ukraine, and many Crimean Tatars were allowed to return to their historical homeland. The city of Simferopol, including the Old Town, became the subject of a number of land disputes between residents of houses seized from deported Tatars, and the descendants of deportees wishing to return.

Following the 2014 Russian annexation of Crimea, Old Simferopol once again found itself under Russian control. International organisations continue to express concerns about collective punishment and ethnic cleansing directed against the Crimean Tatar population. Today, the Old Town is inhabited primarily by the city's Russian population.

== Development ==
Old Simferopol suffers from a number of development problems, including the lack of a functioning sewage system, poor road surfacing, lack of street lighting, poor state of building repair and chaotic development. Due to the close proximity of the Old Town to Simferopol's city centre, the Russian-controlled city administration has proposed the demolition and redevelopment of Old Simferopol a number of times. Following the 2014 Russian annexation of Crimea, many residents of the Old Town were unable to register themselves as the owners of their own houses and flats.

In 2015, Ernst Mavliutov, chief architect of the city of Simferopol, stated that the Old Town would not be redeveloped with high-rise housing. In 2018, however, Chief Architect of the Republic of Crimea Irina Solovyova announced that the authorities intend to carry out renovation works in Old Simferopol, including the demolition of dilapidated housing.

== Gallery ==
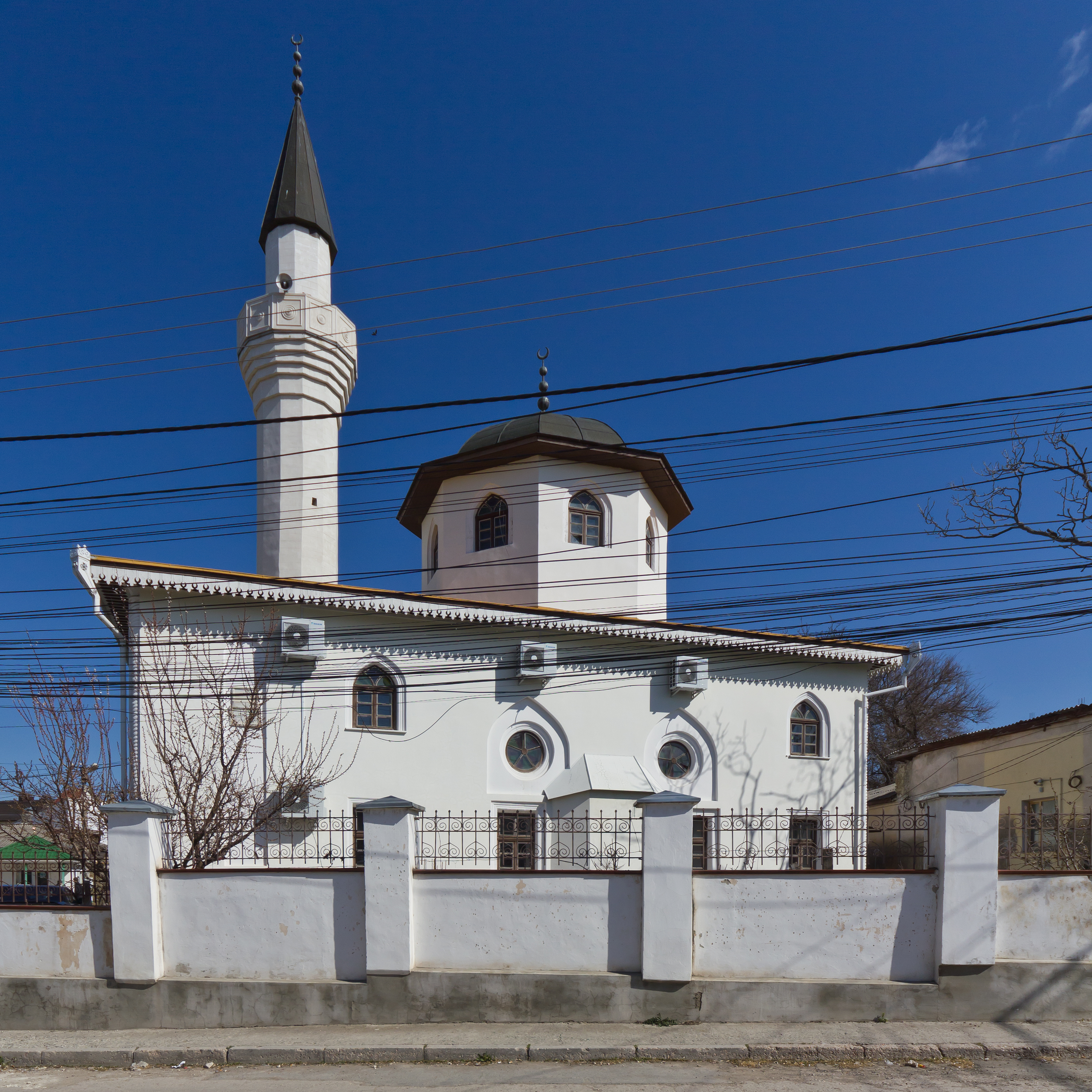
Kebir Mosque

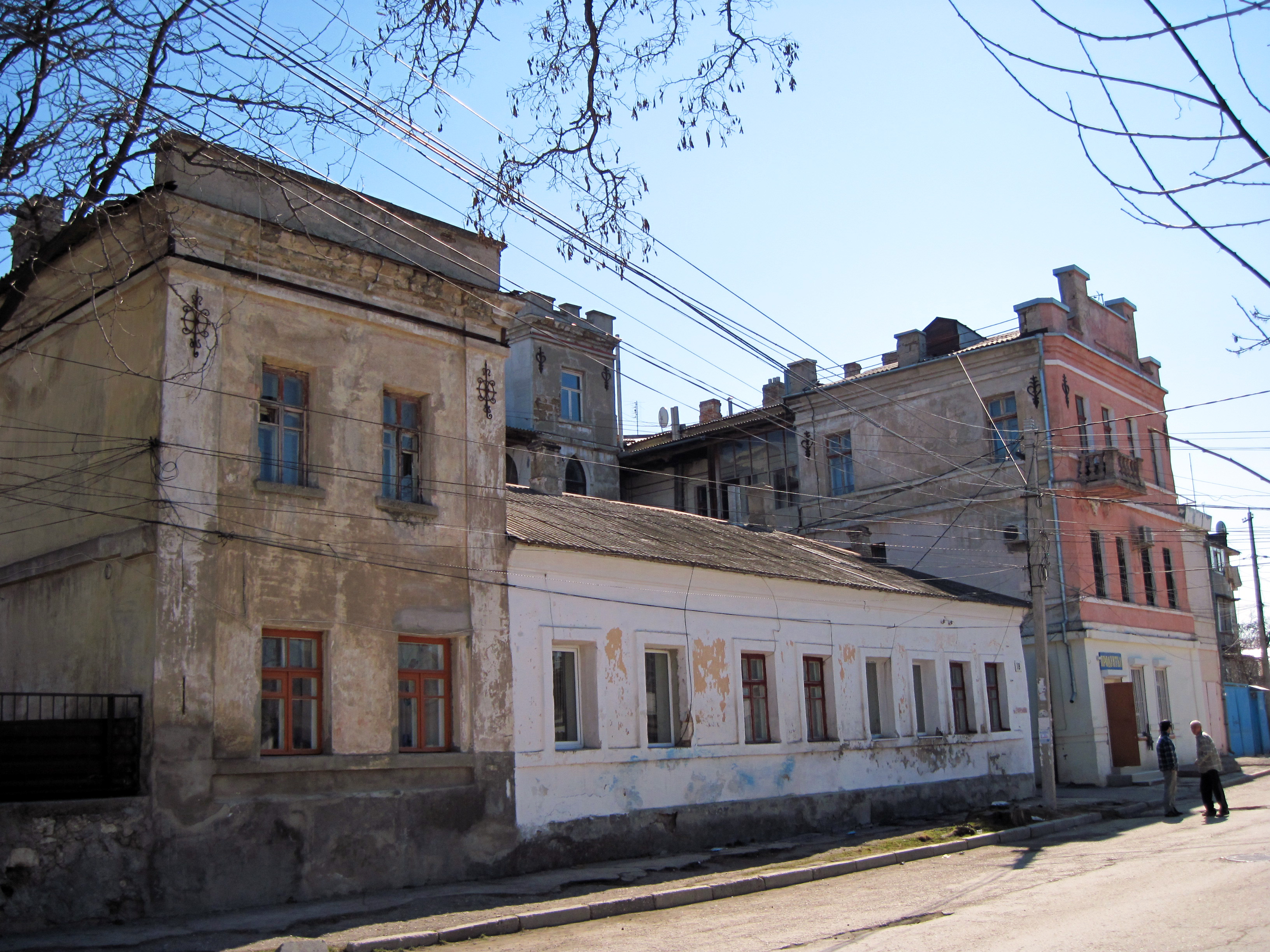
Apartment building on Efremov Street

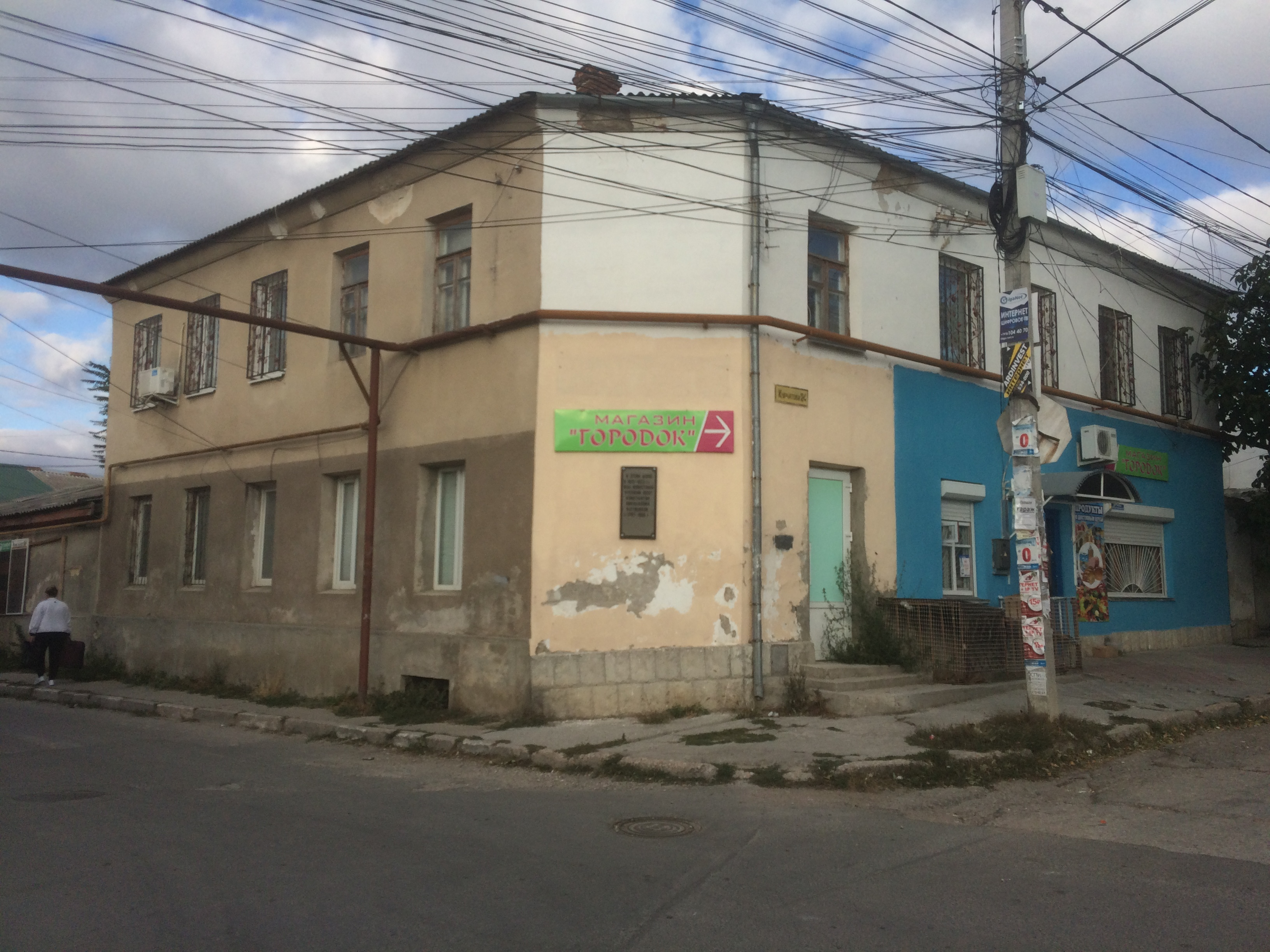
House where the poet Konstantin Batyushkov lived

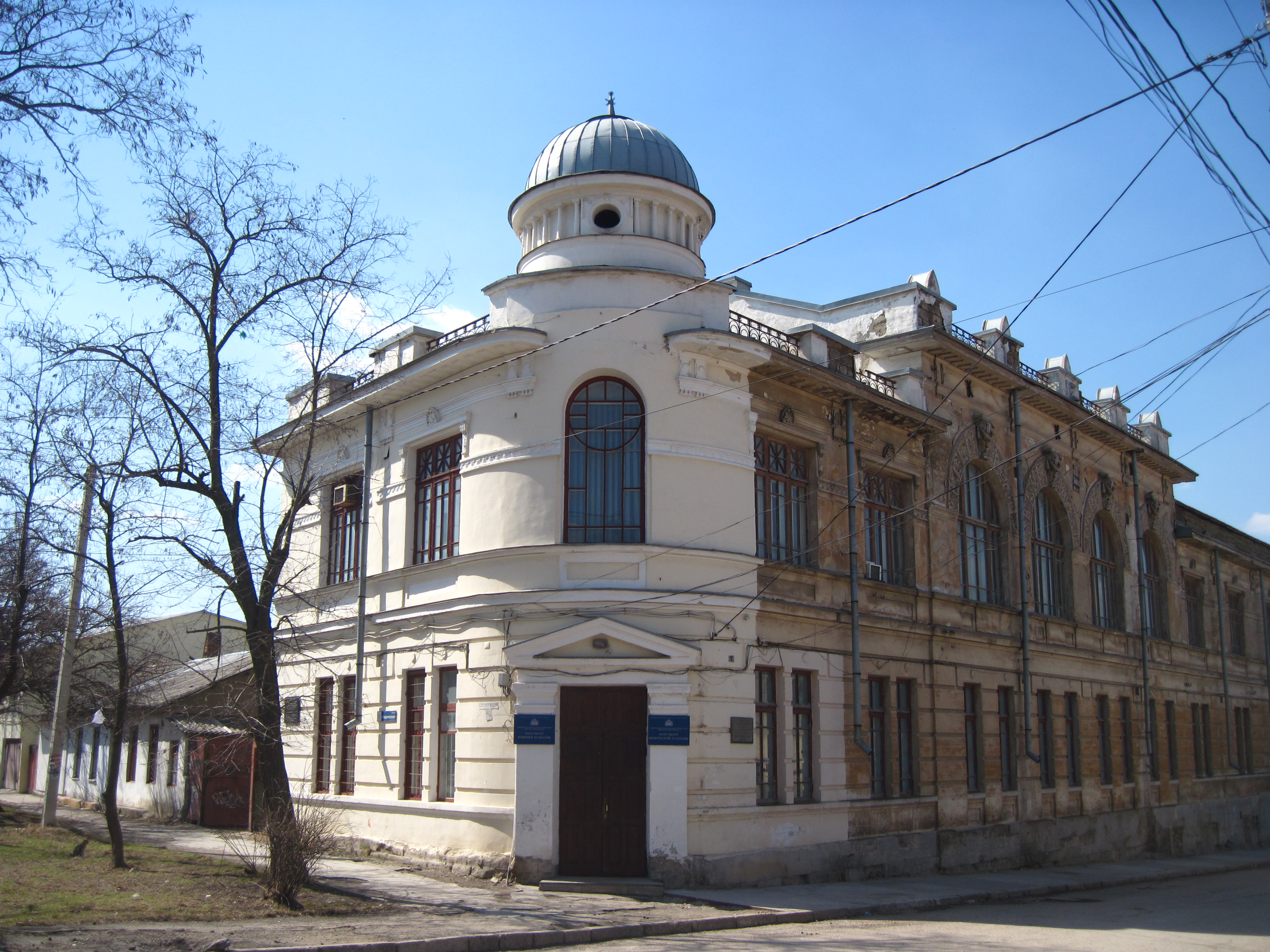
Talmud-Tora Jewish School

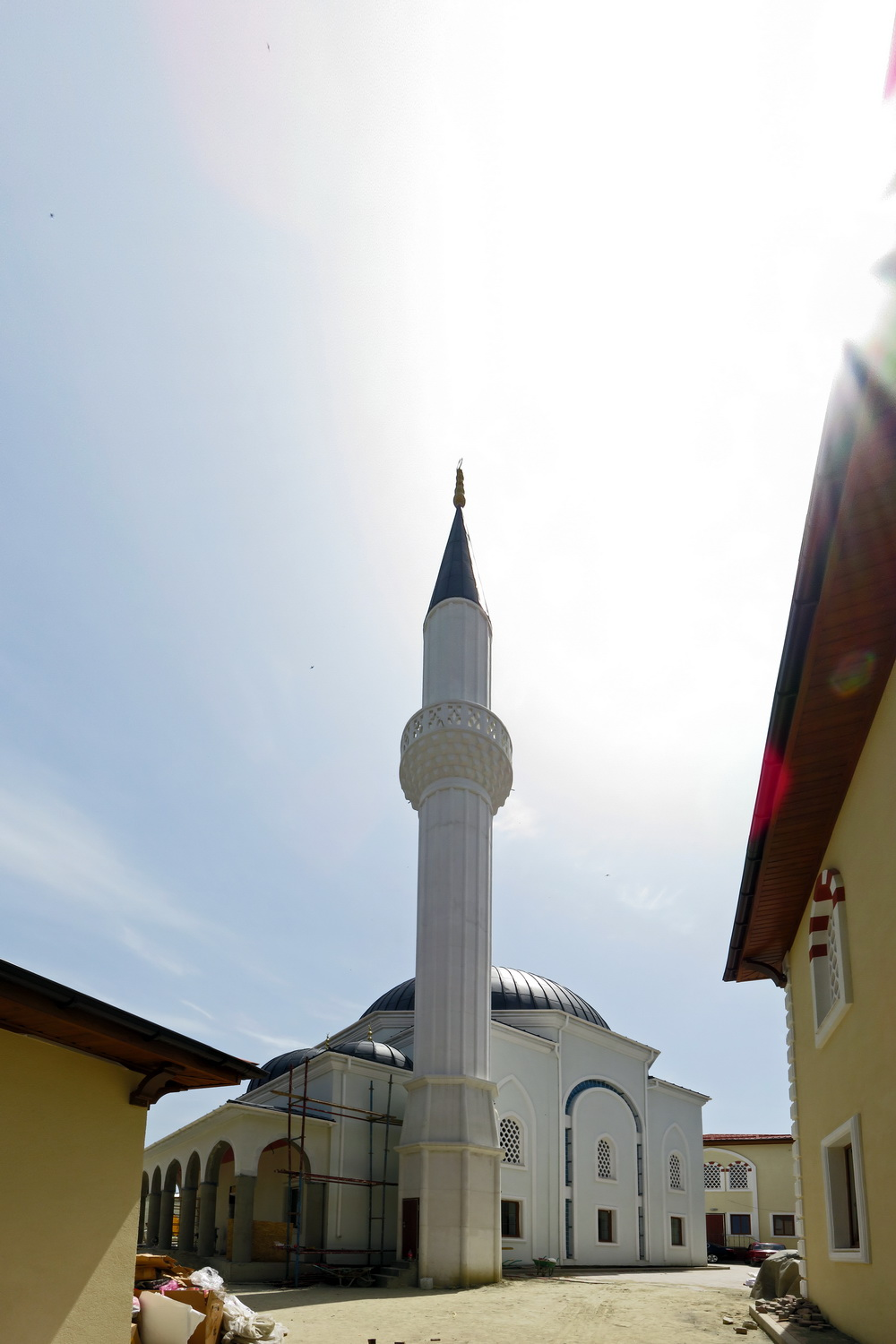
Seyit-Settar Mosque

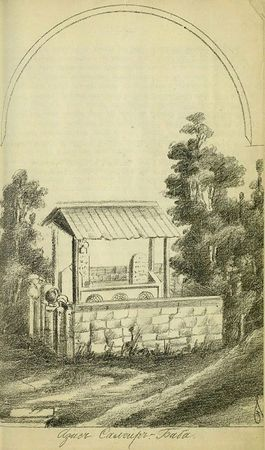
Tomb of the religious elder Aziz Salgir-Baba

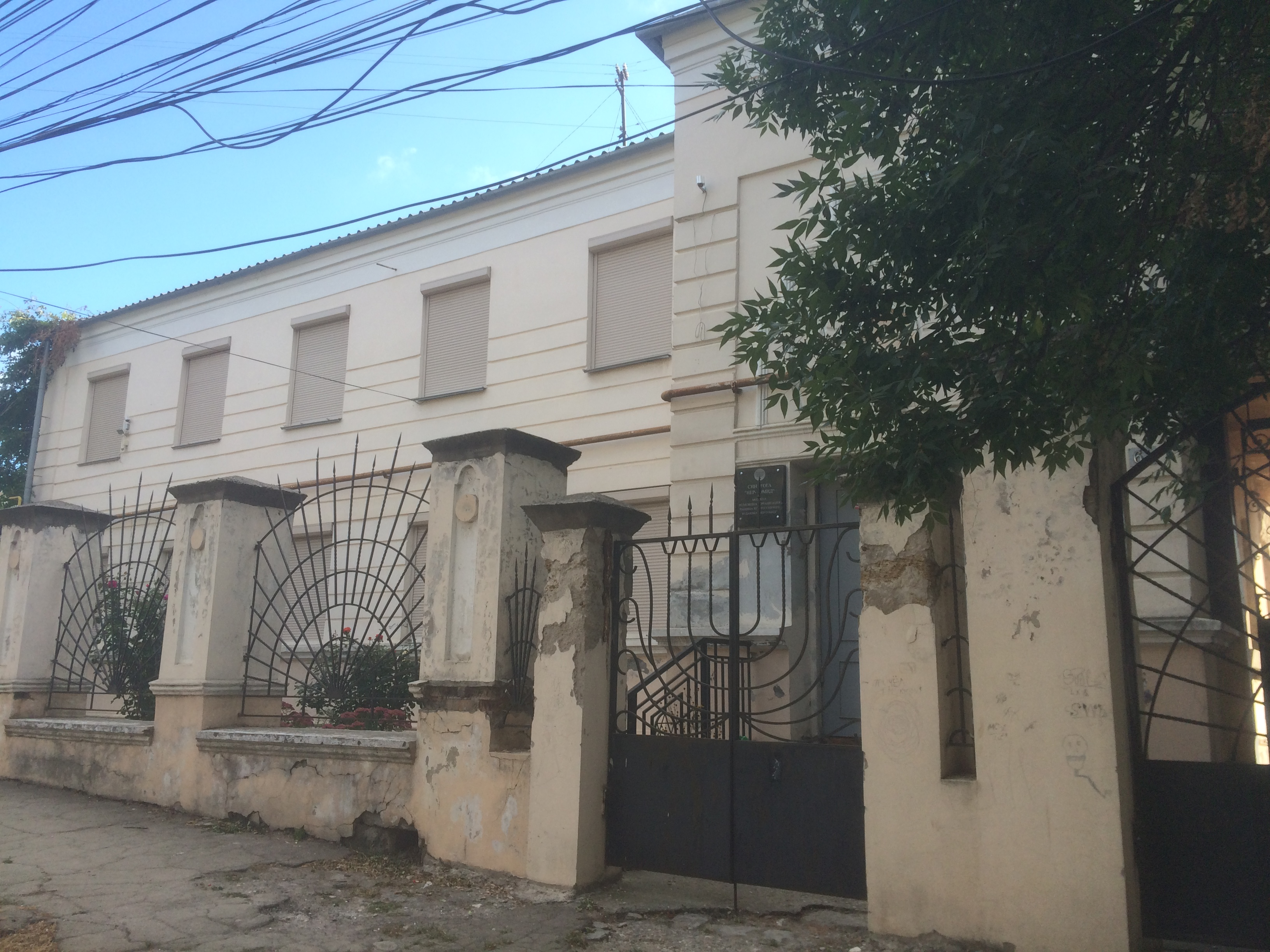
Ner Tomid Synagogue

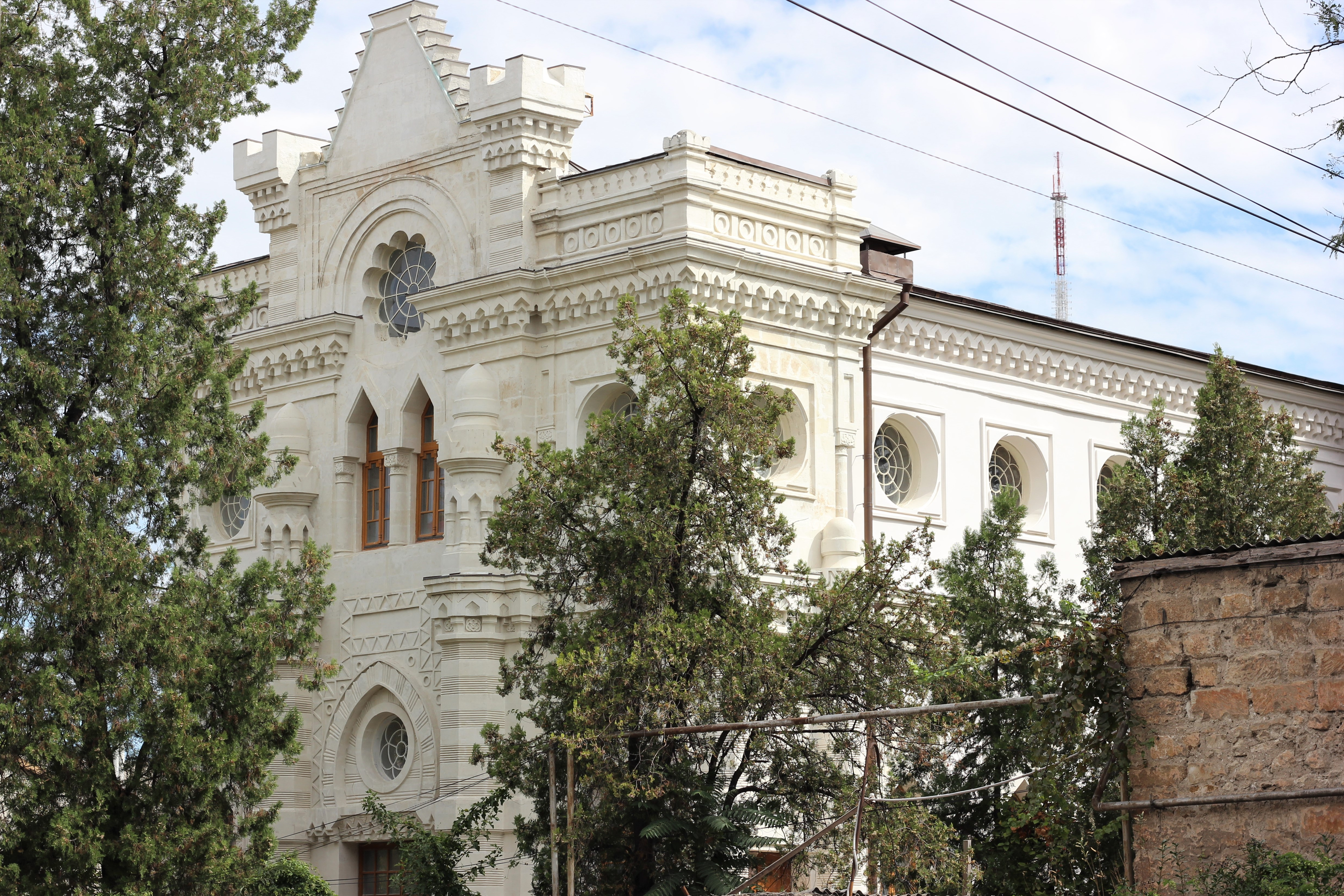
Simferopol Kenesa (Note: A kenesa is an Eastern European or Persian Karaite synagogue.)
