= Eremia Chelebi =

Ottoman-Armenian writer (1637–1695)

Eremia Chelebi Kömürjian
- Born: 12–13 May 1637 Langa, Constantinople, Ottoman Empire
- Died: 15 July 1695 Constantinople, Ottoman Empire
- Resting place: Balıklı Armenian Cemetery
- Occupation: Writer, intellectual, educator, diplomat, cartographer

Eremia Chelebi Kömürjian (12–13 May 1637 – 15 July 1695) was an Ottoman-Armenian writer and intellectual from Constantinople.

== Background ==
Eremia's recent ancestors came from the district around Kemah in the Armenian highlands. Eremia's great grandfather Sarkis Kömürjian, who was a coal dealer (Turkish: kömürcü), abandoned his properties in 1590s during the upheaval caused by the Celali rebellions like most local Armenians and migrated to western Anatolia and Thrace. Sarkis died in the town of Gallipoli in southern Thrace. Nahabed, the son of Sarkis, and his only son Mardiros moved to Constantinople.

== Early life ==
Eremia was born on 12 or 13 May 1637 in the Langa neighborhood of Constantinople to Papas (bishop) Mardiros. Eremia belonged to the Kömürjian family, which was distinguished in intellectual and ecclesiastical circles. Like most Ottoman-Armenians, Eremia was a member of the Armenian Apostolic Church. He had a younger brother Komitas, who would become a priest and "an officially beatified martyr" of the Roman Catholic Church and was venerated by Armenian Catholics, but also Armenian Apostolics, Armenian Protestants, Greeks, and Muslims.

At an early age, Eremia worked alongside Hajji Ampagoum, a wheat contractor who was Eremia's maternal uncle and guardian for some time. Eremia started school and was taught by Der Hovannes, the bishop of the Surp Sarkis Church in the Hisardibi neighborhood. Eremia picked up Turkish in 1656 and later learned Greek, Persian, Arabic, and Hebrew. Although he grew up among clergy, Eremia steered away from that profession as he likely did not want to limit his studies.

== Career ==
Following Hajji Ampagoum's death in 1658, Eremia Chelebi started tutoring the children of Abro Chelebi, a famous Armenian merchant. Eremia Chelebi was able to meet many important Turkish and European figures of the era who often gathered in Abro Chelebi's residence. Eremia Chelebi became the chief clerk and advisor of the Armenian Patriarchate of Constantinople during the term of Mardiros II (1659–60) and mediated difficult disputes between members and dignitaries of the Church. In 1664, the Patriarchate sent Eremia to Aleppo to dissuade arch-patriarch Yeghiazar from creating a new arch-patriarchate based in the city. Eremia established a press in Constantinople under Abro Chelebi in 1677, where he was able to print two risales (brief books).

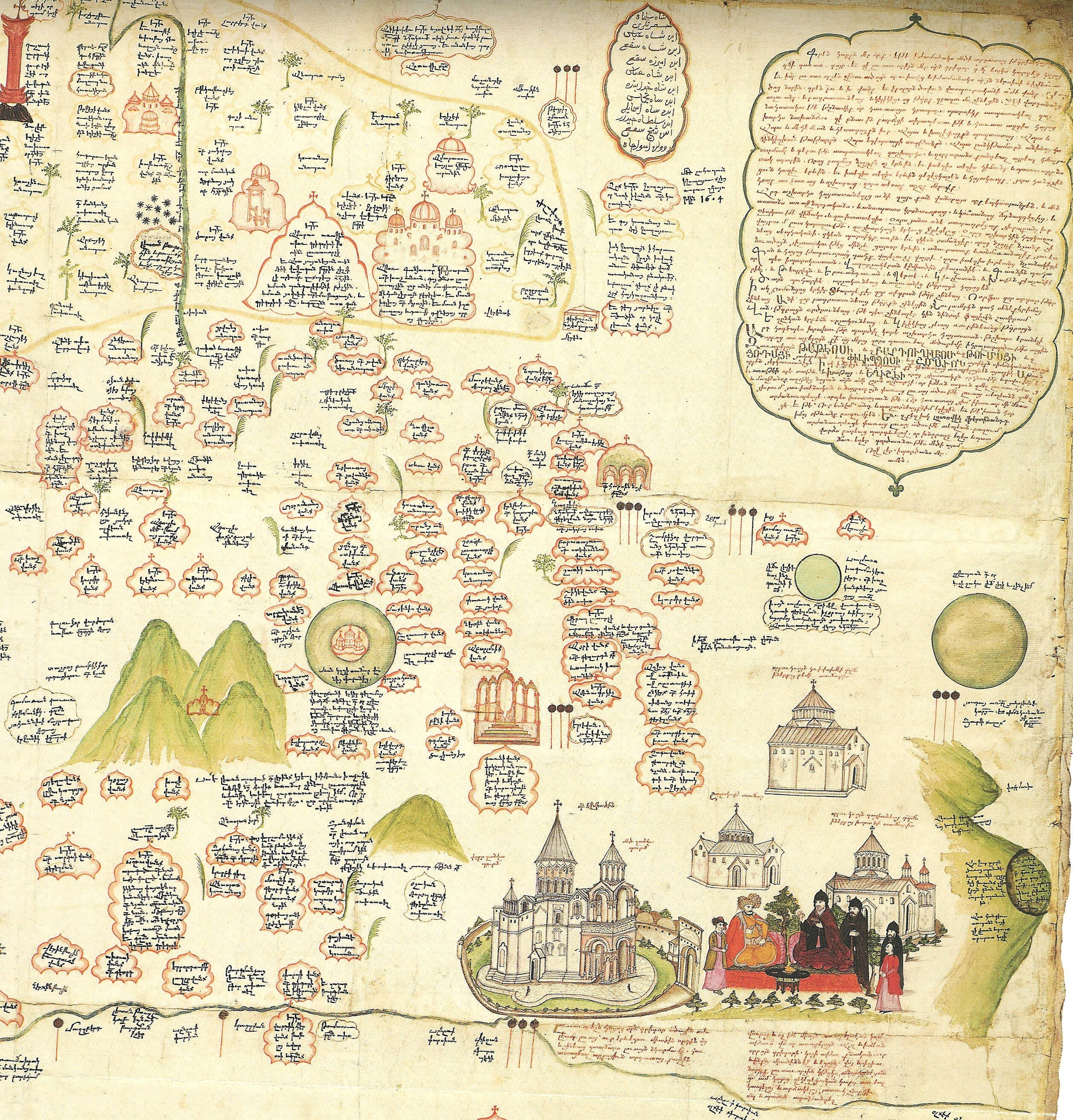
Eremia Chelebi's map of the Armenian churches, completed in 1691.

== Travels and death ==
Between 2 June and 3 October 1685, Eremia Chelebi traveled to Echmiadzin as part of a diplomatic mission of the Armenian Church and also to see his son Kirkoris, who was a priest. En route to the town, Eremia Chelebi visited the cities of Ani, Kars, and Erzurum. When Eremia Chelebi returned to Constantinople the next year, he focused on his books until his death. Eremia Chelebi died on 15 July 1695. He was buried in the Balıklı Armenian Cemetery.

== Bibliography ==
- Sanjian, Avedis Krikor; Tietze, Andreas (1981). Eremya Chelebi Kömürjian's Armeno-Turkish Poem "the Jewish Bride". Harrassowitz. ISBN 9783447020923. OCLC 7883826.
- Shapiro, Henry R. (2021). "Afterlives of Komitas K'eōmurchean (1656-1707): Commemorating an Istanbul-Armenian Martyr in Armeno-Turkish Literature and Sacred Pilgrimage". The Journal of Ottoman Studies. LVIII. Istanbul 29 May University: 81–120. ISSN 0255-0636.
- Yılmazer, Ziya (1995). "Eremya Çelebi". TDV Encyclopedia of Islam, Vol. 11 (Elbi̇stan – Eymi̇r) (in Turkish). Istanbul: Presidency of Religious Affairs, Centre for Islamic Studies. pp. 293–294. ISBN 978-975-389-438-8.
