= Celebic =

Celebic can refer to:

- Celebic languages, a group of Austronesian language spoken primarily in Sulawesi, Indonesia
- Čelebić, a village in Bosnia and Herzegovina
- Čelebić (surname), a Serbo-Croatian surname

== See also ==
- Çelebi
- Čelebići (disambiguation)
