= Suzi Çelebi of Prizren =

Ottoman poet and historiographer (died 1524)

Suzi Çelebi of Prizren (Turkish: Prizrenli Suzi Çelebi; died 1524) was an Ottoman poet and historiographer. He is remembered for his epic poem Gazavatnama Mihaloğlu which narrates the 15th-century Balkan conquests of the Ottomans, and the battles and glory of the military commander Ali Bey Mihaloğlu, being one of the most-known poetic works of the 15th century in overall.

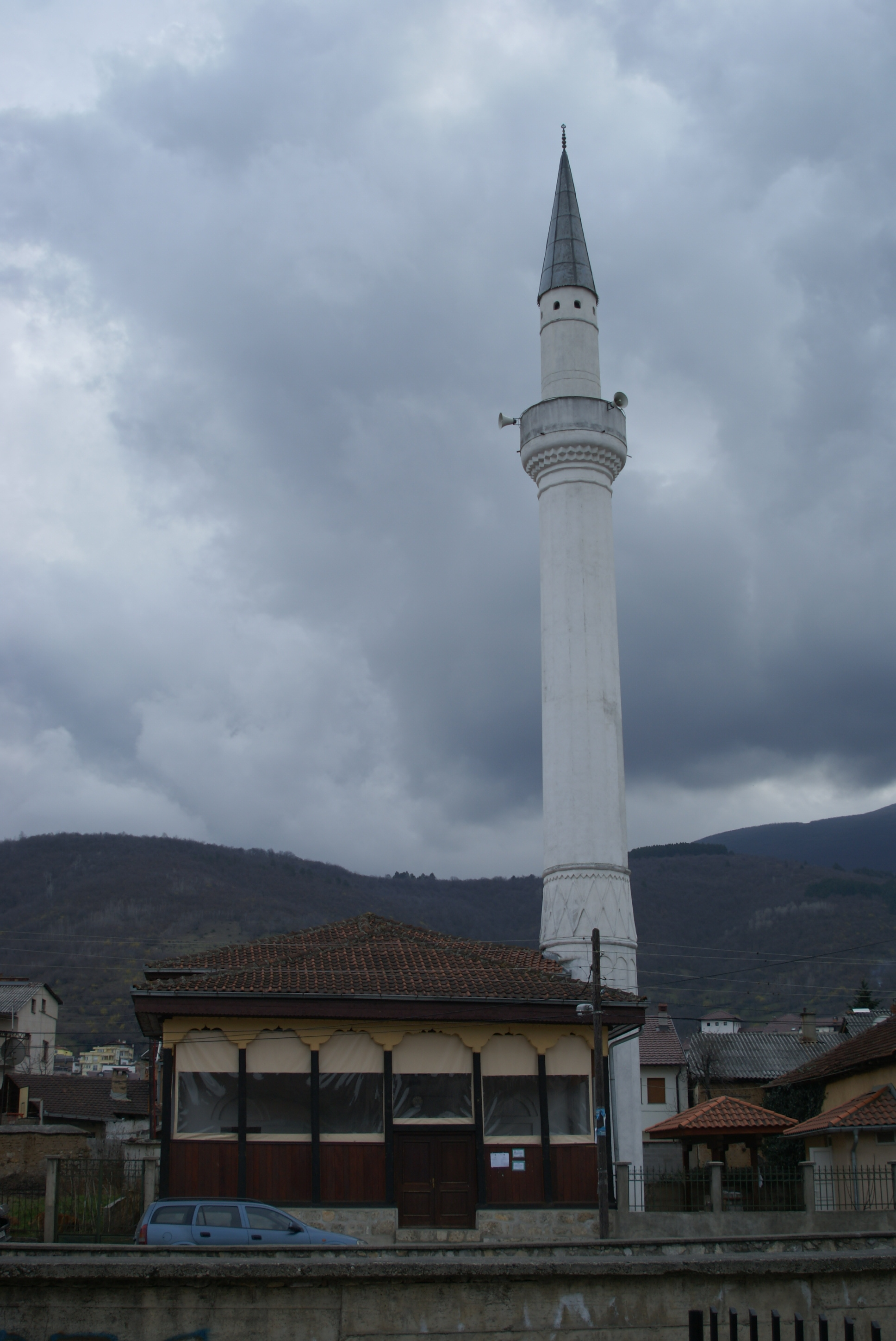
The Suzi Çelebi Mosque was built in 1523.

What is known from his early life, beside his birthplace in Prizren, today's Kosovo, is that he was born between 1455-1465. His real name was Muhammad-Effendi, son of Mahmud, son of Abdullah. Suzi was a pseudonym, meaning "blazing". Other names that he is referred with are Sûzî-i Rûmî, Sûzî-i Pürzerrînî, Mevlânâ Sûzî, Sozi Çelebi/Efendi/Baba. He founded a waqf in Prizren. He also lived a part of his life in Belgrade. The alternative name Naqshbandi Suzi indicates that he belonged to the Naqshbandi order of Sufism.

Suzi Çelebi served as katib of the Ottoman military leader and exploiter Gazi Ali Mihaloğlu, being testimony of many campaigns and battles. On his return to Prizren he drafted Gazavatnam Mihaloğlu, an epic poem of around 15,000 verses out of which 2,000 survived and are conserved in the Library of Berlin and in the "Oriental Collection" of the (former) Yugoslav Academy of Sciences and Arts in Zagreb together with his vakufnama (deed of perpetual endowment), a 50x30 document of 16th century.
Although his poem was intended to be an epic military chronicle, the poet infused it with florid language in order to make it as attractive as a lyric one.

Suzi Çelebi died in Prizren and was buried in the small Suzi Çelebi Mosque in Prizren's center, on the left side of Bistrica river. It was built in 1513 and is the oldest in town. The grave is surrounded by a small wall and the year of death is signed on it.

A street in Prizren is named after him.

== See also ==
- Aşık Çelebi
- Dukaginzâde Yahyâ bey
