= Mehdi Halıcı =

Turkish writer (1927–2008)

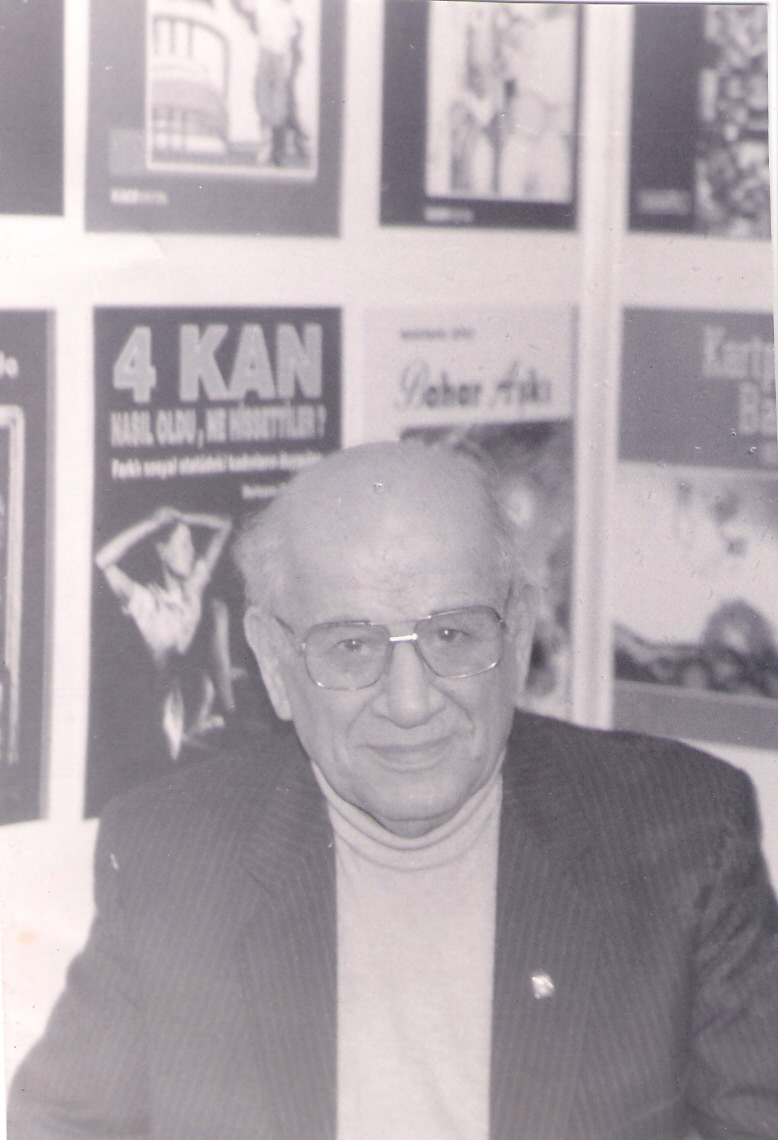
- Born: April 10, 1927; Konya, Turkey
- Died: April 8, 2008 (aged 80); İzmir, Turkey
- Other name: Cemşid Bender
- Occupations: Lawyer, writer
- Years active: 1951–2005
- Spouse: Ayla Halıcı

Mehdi Halıcı (10 April 1927 – 8 April 2008) was a Kurdish writer from Turkey who wrote several novels and books about Kurdish and Turkish culture and history. He was also widely known as Cemşid Bender, the pseudonym he used for books and articles on the Kurdish culture and history.

== Personal life ==
Halıcı was born on 10 April 1927 in Konya to Sabri Bey, a carpet salesman from Kiğı who settled in Konya. Sabri was a well-known disciple of Said Nursi. Halıcı was the brother of poet and politician Feyzi Halıcı and food writer Nevin Halıcı and an uncle to businessman and politician Emrehan Halıcı and sociologist Nilgün Çelebi.

He died on 8 April 2008 in İzmir.

== Works ==
Among the books written by Halıcı are Konya sazı ve türküleri (1985) and Karides durağı: hikâyeler (1967).
