= Chalabi (surname) =

Chalabi (Arabic: جلبي) is a surname. Notable people with the surname Chalabi or al-Chalabi include:

- Ahmed Chalabi (1944–2015), Iraqi politician
- Ammar Al-Chalabi (fl. 1999 – present), British neuroscientist and motor neuron diseases researcher
- Burhan Al-Chalabi (born 1947), British-Iraqi writer and political commentator
- Edgard Chalabi (1928–1963), Lebanese chess master
- Fadhil Chalabi (1929–2019), Iraqi oil economist
- Husam al-Din Chalabi (1225–1284), Kurdish Muslim Sufi and a prominent disciple of Rumi
- Issam Al-Chalabi (1942–2025), Iraqi politician
- Mona Chalabi (born 1987), British writer
- Nuri Ja'far Ali al-Chalabi, known as Nuri Ja'far (1914–1991), Iraqi psychologist and philosopher of education
- Salem Chalabi (born 1963), Iraqi lawyer
- Selma Chalabi (fl. 2000s), British radio producer and journalist

== See also ==
- Çelebi; includes surnames
