= Ahdi of Baghdad =

Ottoman poet (d. 1593)

Ahdi of Baghdad (d. 1593), also referred to in Turkish as Bağdadlı Ahdi Ahmed Çelebi, was an Ottoman and Safavid era poet and bibliographer of the 16th century. He was one of the first four Ottoman poets to write a tezkire (bibliographical dictionary of poetry).

Ahdi was born in Baghdad and was of Persian descent. His birth name was Ahmed bin Shemsi. In the year 960, by the Islamic calendar, he went to Constantinople. There he learned the Ottoman Turkish language and made contact with many distinguished poets of the time. After residing in the capital for 11 years, he returned to Baghdad (971 IC). There he continued being part of the poetic circles. The Ottoman historian and traveler Mustafa Âlî mentions Ahdi as one of the best known Arabic poets in Baghdad during 1585–1586, out of 30 in total.
Ahdi's main work is the tezkire named Gülşen-i Şuara (Rosebed of Poets), which he wrote the same year on his return home. It was different from the previous ones written until then because it covered only poets contemporary to the author's lifetime. It was finished in 1563, and was dedicated to Prince Selim, afterwards known as Sultan Selim II.
Ahdi died in Baghdad towards the end of Selim's reign.

== See also ==
- Sehi Bey
- Aşık Çelebi
- Kastamonulu Lâtifi Çelebi
