= Arabi katibi =

Administrative position in the Ottoman Empire

Arabi katibi (Ottoman Turkish:عربي كاتبى), also katib-i Arabi (كاتب عربي): "Arab secretary" or "secretary of Arabic (language)" was a low-level administrative position in some Arab provinces of the Ottoman Empire beginning approximately in the eighteenth century. The position is best documented in the province of Sidon (Sidon Eyalet), where the Arabi katibi appears to have been primarily responsible for registering rural tax farm (iltizam) contracts and incomes. Other cities where an Arabi katibi is attested in the eighteenth or nineteenth century include Aleppo, Tripoli, Hama, Latakia and Urfa. "Arabi Katibi" has also become a common family name in the Levant.
