= Seyit-Settar Mosque =

Mosque in Simferopol, Crimea

- Seyit-Settar Cami
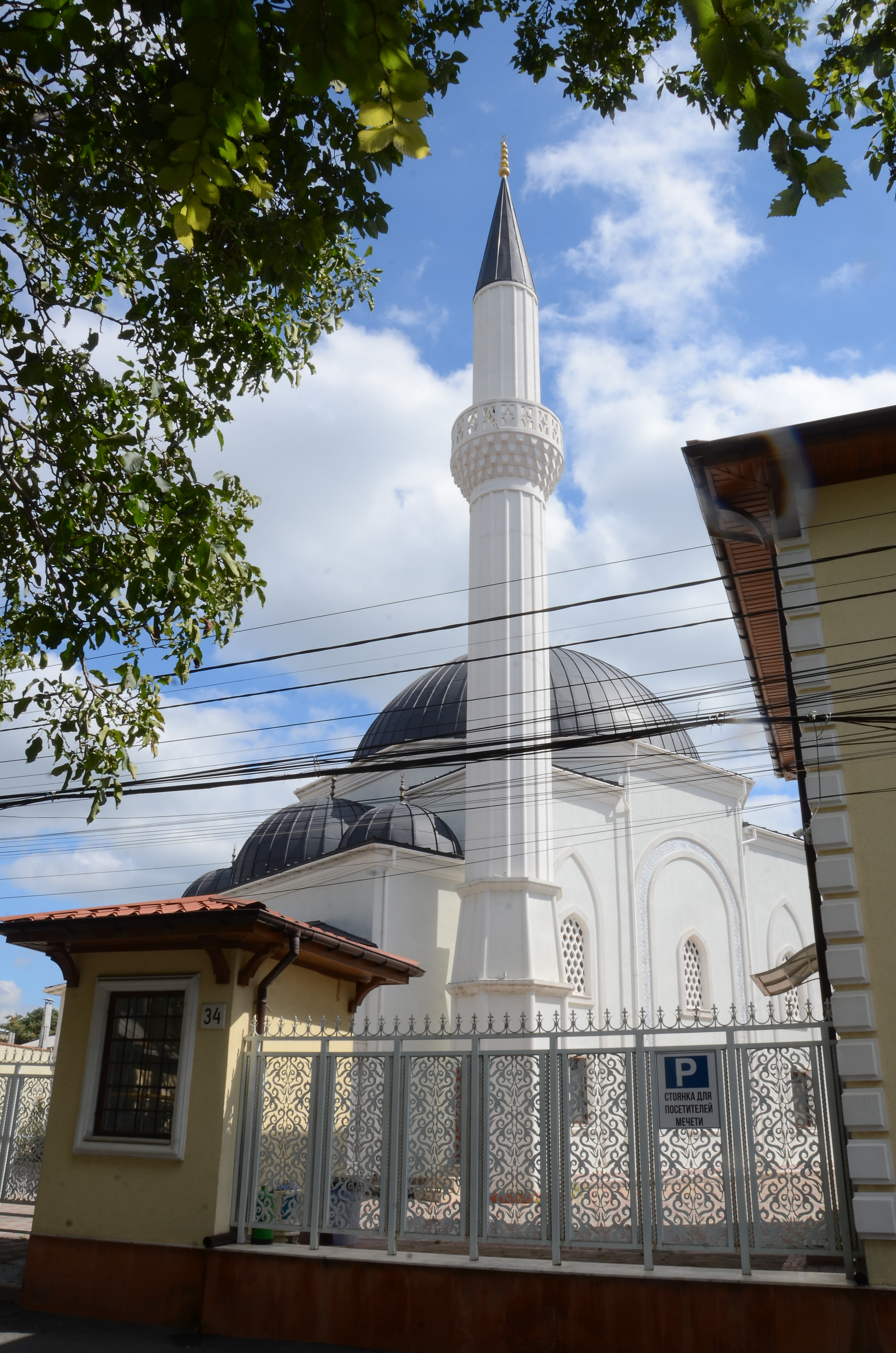

Religion
- Affiliation: Islam

Location
- Location: Simferopol, Crimea
- Interactive map of Seyit-Settar Mosque

Architecture
- Type: mosque
- Completed: 2016
- Demolished: 2014 (old building)

The Seyit-Settar Mosque (Crimean Tatar: Seyit-Settar Cami) is a mosque in Old Simferopol neighborhood of Simferopol, Crimea.

== History ==
Records indicate that the mosque was funded in 1850 by the then Simferopol city mayor, merchant Seyit Settar Çelebi.

During the Great Purge, the mosque was abandoned by the religious community under fear of reprisals by the Bolsheviks. In 1990s during the massive return of Crimean Tatars from the exile the mosque was reopened.

In 2014 the old building was demolished. Before that, in 2013 the city council allocated 0.4452 hectares of territory adjacent to the mosque to the Spiritual Administration of the Muslims of Crimea for the reconstruction of the building and the construction of a madrasah, an administrative building and a building for students. The new mosque, constructed over the old basement, was inaugurated in 2016.
