= Tezkire =

Ottoman form of bibliographical dictionary or compendium

Tezkire (Arabic: تذکرة), from Arabic tadhkirah meaning "something that causes one to remember" or "memorandum", is a form of bibliographical dictionary or bibliographical compendium which flourished in the 16th-century Ottoman Empire. The most widely known are the tezkires of poets, but the books also focused on the works of government officials and artists in general. First seen in early Arab literature before the 10th century, they then made their way into Persian literature and later Ottoman literature.

One of the most famous Persian tezkires is the Tazkirat al-Awliya of Fariduddin Attar. The most important tezkire in Chagatai-Turkic is Majolis un-Nafois by Ali-Shir Nava'i.

== Ottoman poetry tezkires ==
The tezkires of poets were written between the 16th and 20th centuries in the Anatolian area. They contain information on both poets and their poetic work, and are written both in prose and verses making the tezkire genre unique. A valuable source of information for today's scholars, they also present a type of ego-document due to the combination of objective with subjective material. The bibliographical notices mention birthplace, family, teachers, profession, personal anecdotes, comments on personality or character, place and date of death, and quotations from poetry.

The first tezkire of Ottoman literature was named Heşt Behişt (Eight Springs). It was the work of Sehi Bey of Edirne (1471?-1548) and was completed in 1538. 2 other editions would follow until 1548. It narrated the work and life of 241 poets and was very well received and supported by the Ottoman high social circles.

A distinguished tezkire is the Tezkiretü'ş-Şuara (Memoirs of the Poets) of Latifî of Kastamonu (1491-1582), the second in chronology and is the one with most extant copies (91). It was finished and presented to Sultan Suleiman I in 1546. Another important one comes from Aşık Çelebi; Meşairü'ş-Şuara (Senses of Poets), published in 1568, covers the work and life of 427 poets. It is the 3rd in chronology, and the second by the number of extant copies (30). The 4th tezkire is the one from Ahdi of Baghdad, of Persian origin, and is named Gülşen-i Şuara (Rosebed of Poets). Unlike the previous three, it covered only the author's time contemporary poets. It was finished in 1563, and was dedicated to Prince Selim, afterwards known as Sultan Selim II.

Other well known tezkire:

- Riyazi - Riyazü'ş Şuara
- Faizi - Zübtedü'l-Eşar
- Mirzade Mehmed Efendi - Salim Tezkiresi
- Ali Güfti - Teşrifatü'ş Şuara
- Davud Fatin - Haitmetül-Eşar
- Kınalızâde Hasan Çelebi - Tezkiretü'ş-Şuara

== See also ==
- Diwan poetry
