= Chalabi, Kermanshah =

Chalabi چلبي
- Village
- Location within Iran
- Coordinates: 34°26′18″N 46°34′38″E
- Country: Iran
- Province: Kermanshah
- County: Kermanshah
- Bakhsh: Kuzaran
- Rural District: Sanjabi

Population (2006)
  - Total: 18
- Time zone: UTC+3:30 (IRST)
  - Summer (DST): UTC+4:30 (IRDT)

Chalabi (Persian: چلبي, also romanized as Chalabī) is a village in Sanjabi Rural District, Kuzaran District, Kermanshah County, Kermanshah Province, Iran. At the 2006 census its population was 18, in 4 families.
