= Fehmî =

Ottoman poet (1564–1596)

Fehmî (1564–1596), also referred as Kınalızâde Mehmet Fehmi, Kınalızâde Fehmi Çelebi or Molla Mohammed (Mehmet) Fehmi was an Ottoman diwan poet.

A scion of the prominent Kınalızâde family from Isparta in Anatolia, Fehmî was born in Damascus, today's Syria, back then part of the Damascus Eyalet of the Ottoman Empire, where his father was working as a kadı (judge). He was the son of the well-known scholar Ali Çelebi, and brother of the other poet Kınalızâde Hasan Çelebi.
