= Andrea Wolf =

German far-left terrorist

Andrea Wolf (Kurdish nickname: Ronahî, January 15, 1965, in Munich – October 23, 1998, in Çatak, Van province, Turkey) was a radical leftist activist. She was a PKK militant. She was killed while fighting with the PKK in 1998. Before her death, Wolf had been implicated in revolutionary activities, and was accused of being part of the Red Army Faction from Germany. The Andrea Wolf case is the focus of a short film by Hito Steyerl called November.
