= Âmil Çelebioğlu =

Turkish language and literature researcher and professor

Âmil Çelebioğlu (20 April 1934, Karaman, Turkey – 2 July, 1990, Mecca, Saudi Arabia) was a Turkish language and literature researcher and professor, who "worked in the field of classical Turkish literature, produced dozens of works and educated hundreds of students; Çelebioğlu was a scholar who was aware of the Islamic texture of Turkish literature and wanted to reveal this aspect; He concentrated his studies on religious and Sufi subjects". Âmil Çelebioğlu is said to be the descendant of Hüsameddin Çelebi, the disciple of Rumi and developer of the Mevlevi Order. His grandfather, Ebûbekir Çelebi (Zükür Çelebi), was the last Karaman Mevlevi Lodge sheikh.

Âmil Çelebioğlu also wrote poetry under the pseudonym Hayrânî. A total of 284 pieces of his poetry are collected together under the title Yıldızlar ve Çiçekler ("Stars and Flowers").

Çelebioğlu died in the 1990 Mecca tunnel tragedy while performing the Hajj.

== Family ==
Âmil Çelebioğlu was born to Ali Rıza Bey and Fevziye Hanım. He had an elder sister Zekâvet Gülener (b. 1929) and younger brother Âdil Çelebioğlu (b. 1946). Two other sisters, Gevher and Birsen, died in their infancy.

Âmil married Zuhal Öztekin Hanımefendi in 1964. They had two daughters, Adile (b. 1967) and Emetullah (b. 1970), and a son, Celâleddin Muhammed Ergun (b. 1975). Adile died in a traffic accident in 1980.
