= Nevin Halıcı =

Turkish cookbook writer

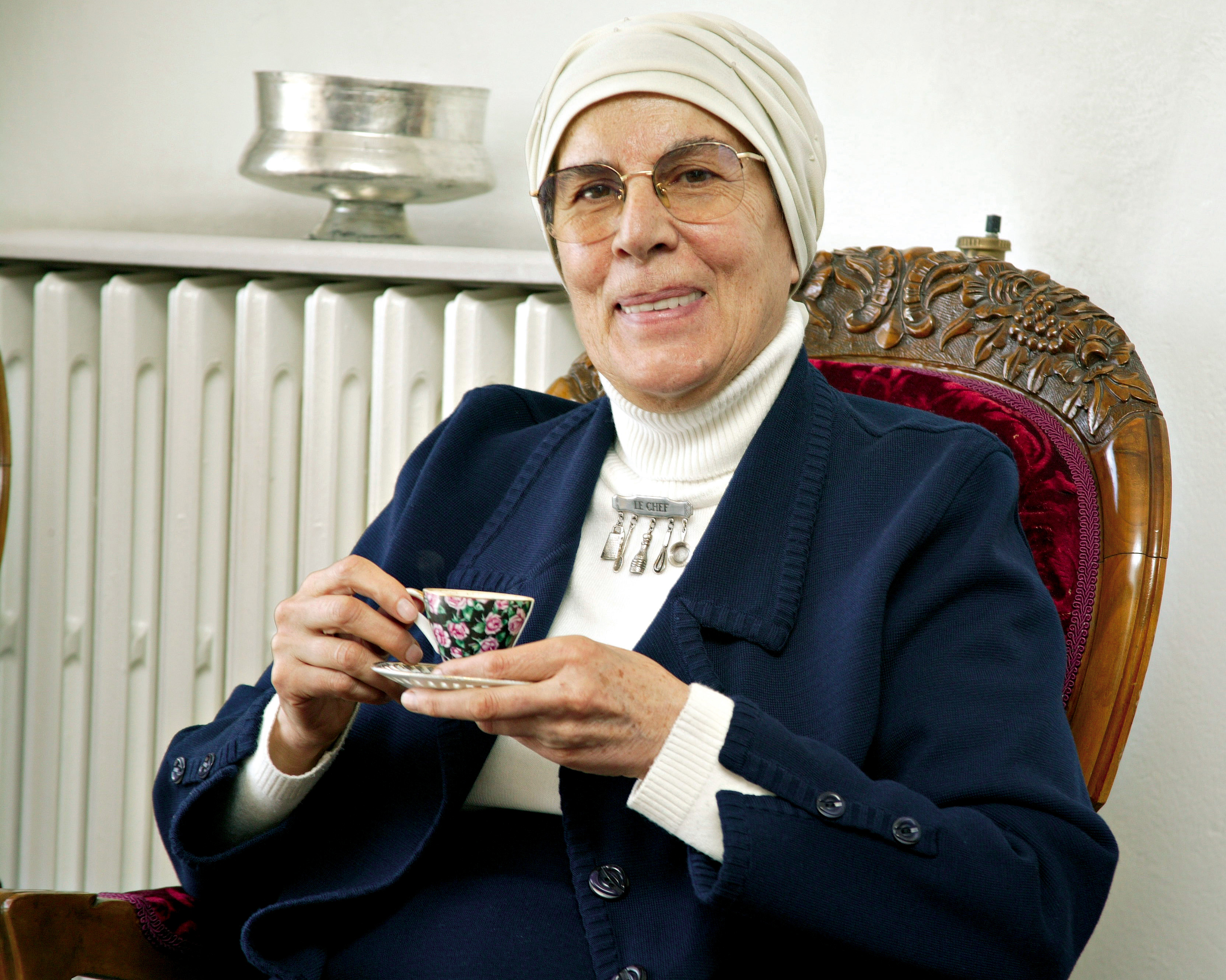
- Born: Konya, Turkey
- Occupation(s): Writes and lectures about Turkish cuisine.

Nevin Halıcı is a Kurdish writer, cultural anthropologist and lecturer on Turkish cuisine. Her book "Nevin Halici's Turkish Cookbook" was the first published cookbook translated from Turkish to English. She has published many cookbooks mostly in Turkish. Those translated into English included books on Sufi cuisine, a type of Islamic cooking. She also writes about regional Turkish cooking, and Ottoman cuisine. Halıcı is the sister of lawyer and writer Mehdi Halıcı. She has been described as "a sort of Turkish Paul Prudhomme".

== Life ==
Nevin Halıcı is a Kurdish writer and lecturer of Turkish cuisine from Turkey. She was born and educated in Konya, before studying home economics and nutrition at Gazi University in Ankara from 1970 to 1975, after which she studied cookery at City and Guilds of London Institute in England. Halıcı completed her master's degree at Selçuk University in 1991 and her doctorate at Gazi University in 1997.

She has published many cookbooks mostly in Turkish. Those translated into English included books on Sufi cuisine, a type of Islamic cooking. She also writes about regional Turkish cooking, and Ottoman cuisine. Halıcı is the sister of lawyer and writer Mehdi Halıcı. Herbook "Nevin Halici's Turkish Cookbook", published in 1990, was the first published cookbook translated from Turkish to English. She has been described as "a sort of Turkish Paul Prudhomme". Besides writing, Halıcı has also prepared Turkish meals for symposia and conferences, including one for the American Institute of Wine and Food in San Francisco. She named one of her dishes, a variation on imam bayildi using quinces instead of aubergines, after Middle Eastern food expert Claudia Roden.

In 2021 she founded the Nevin Halıcı Food Culture Foundation.
