= Selma Chalabi =

British radio producer and journalist

Selma Chalabi is a British radio producer and journalist for BBC Wales. She was born in the United Kingdom to an Iraqi father and English mother, and was raised in Winchester.

== Career ==
She has produced short films about her father's homeland, in a bid to not only discover more of her Arabic roots but to also address media stereotypes towards Iraqis. She worked with and received support from Valley and Vale Community Arts when directing and producing Land Of My Father. Stories collected by Chalabi when interviewing her family for Land Of My Father inspired her to create Blue Eyes, a short film about her Iraqi grandmother.

== Filmography ==
- Land Of My Father
- Blue Eyes
- The Note

== Video ==
- Land Of My Father
- Blue Eyes
- The Note
