= Riyazi =

Ottoman poet and bibliographer

Riyazi (c. 1572 or 1573 –1644), also known as Riyazî Mehmet Efendi, was an Ottoman poet and bibliographer. His Riyazü'ş Şuara tezkire (bibliographical dictionary of poets and poetry), is the seventh of its kind in Ottoman history and is of great importance. Riyazi is considered the last of a group of bibliographers who tried to cover the entire field of Ottoman poetry.

== Life ==
Riyazi was born with the name Mehmet in Mecca in the Islamic year 980 which corresponds to 1572 or 1573. 1572 is mostly accepted as birth year. He was named after his grandfather, the great scholar Mehmet Efendi of Birgi (from Birgi) who died in 1573, and was the son of Mustafa of Birgi. His father was a Kadı (judge) and gave Mehmet his early education. On his return to Istanbul, Mehmet joined the jurisprudence profession. He received madrasah education by Müeyyedzade Abdülkâdir Efendi. He served as mullah in many towns including Istanbul, Jerusalem, Cairo, Aleppo, and many provinces in Anatolia.
In 1626 he retired due to deafness and there was no work from him since then. Riyazi died on 7 May 1644 in Istanbul.

== Poetry ==
Riyazü'ş Şuara is the seventh in the line of great Ottoman tezkires. It covered a selection of poets based on "greatness" as adjudicated by the author supported with an independent judgment. Other bibliographers that followed him had various opinions on him. His character is described as marked by avarice and meanness; both it and Riyazi's poetry influenced a lot by his wife. Ziya Pasha describes him as "the white rose of the garden of speech and the champion in the field of art", and singles out his qasida for particular commendation. The tezkire was started in 1607. The first recension was done in 1609 (1018 A.H.). The second recension is believed to have finished in 1617, as it includes drastic changes in the biography of Sultan Ahmed I who died that year.
Riyzi was influence by the other known poet Nef'i, but only in the particular attention that he bestowed over his verses, his work is not modeled after any previous poet school.
Riyazi was of course a poet himself. He left a vast diwan of poetry. In addition, he has other works: the Sakiname, and a Turkish-Persian dictionary.
