= Ali Çelebi =

Ottoman jurist and writer (c. 1510–1572)

Kınalızâde Ali Çelebi (1510/11?–1572), known by the Islamic name Mullah Ala al-Din Ali Kınalızâde or simply Kınalızade Ali, was an Ottoman high-ranking jurist and writer.

== Life ==
Ali Çelebi was born in Isparta, Anatolia in the Islamic year of 916, corresponding to 1510 or 1511, member of a notable family. He was the son of Kadı (judge) Emrullah Mehmed (d.1559) and the grandson of Abd' al-Kadir Hamidi. As his father, he became a judge and served in several locations within the Empire: Damascus, Bursa, Cairo, and Edirne. In October or November 1570 he settled in Constantinople. Ali was appointed Kadi'asker for Anatolia in early summer 1571. He died on January 22 or 23, 1572, during the Holy Ramadan month. Ali left two sons, both noted poets of the time. Mehmet Fehmı Efendi (d. May 1596), known as Fehmî, and Hasan, known as Kınalızâde Hasan Çelebi. Though both left their name in the Ottoman literature, according to the historian Mustafa Âlî who knew the family members, none of them rose at the level of their father.

Beside being a judge, Ali was a very industrious writer, producing a number of glossaries and commentaries on Islamic theological works. His notable work was Akhlak-ı Ala'i written in 1564 and dedicated to the beylerbey of Syria, Ali Pasha. It is a high end study on ethics. The original manuscript is conserved in the "Rhagib Pasha Library" in Istanbul. It was printed in February 1833 in Bulaq, published in 1974, and was first translated by the Venetian Giovanni Medun. Another valuable work is his collection of letters, divided in five sections. It contains stylistic masterpieces of different kinds of literary compositions.
