= Čelebići =

Čelebići may refer to:

- Čelebići, Foča, a village in the municipality of Foča, Bosnia and Herzegovina
- Čelebići, Konjic, a village in the municipality of Konjic, Bosnia and Herzegovina
  - Čelebići camp, a former prison camp in that village

== See also ==
- Çelebi
- Celebic (disambiguation)
