= Aşık Çelebi =

Ottoman biographer, poet, and translator (1520–1572)

- Pir Mehmed
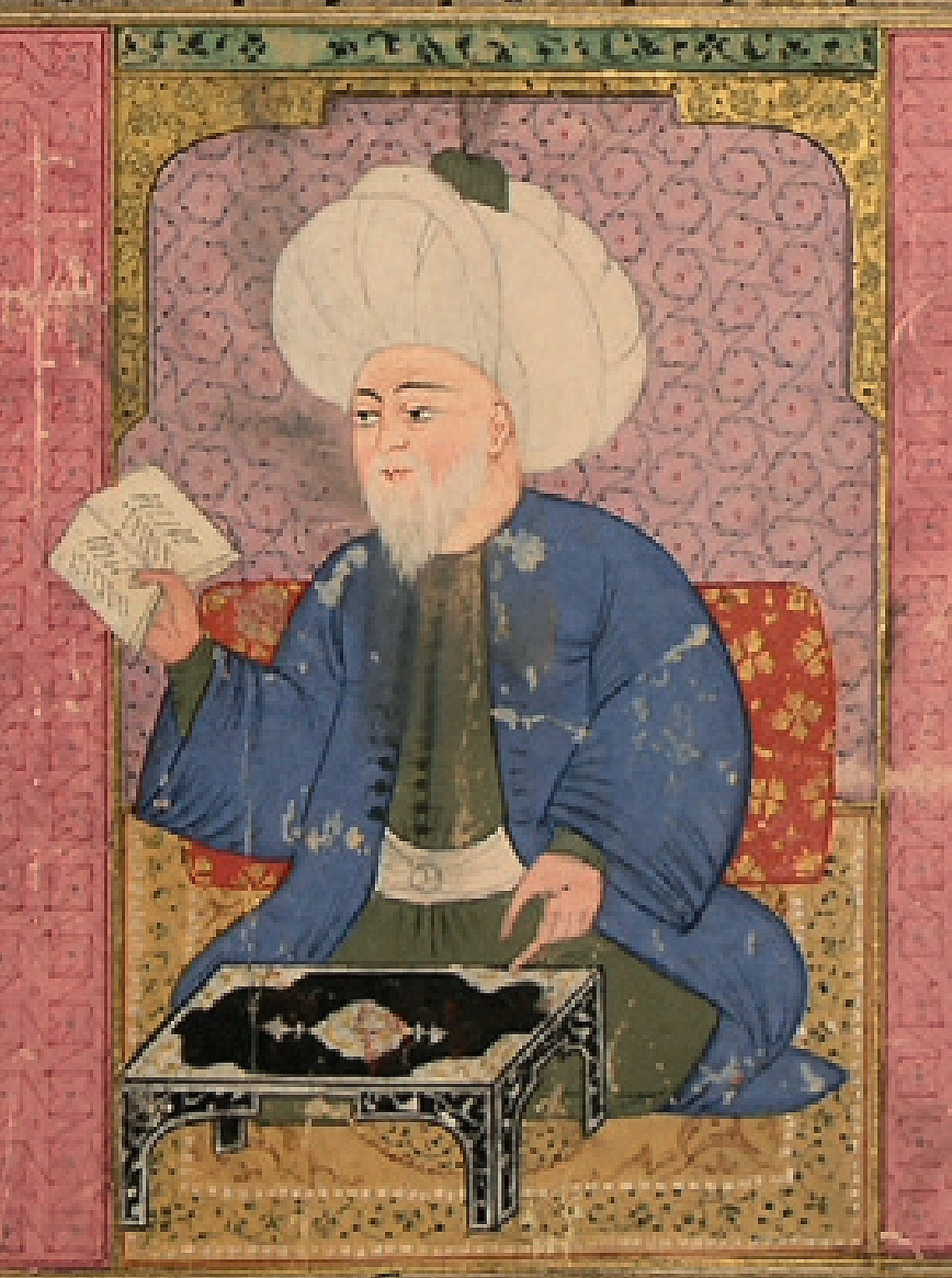
- Asik Celebi in "Mesairu-s suara".
- Born: 1520; Prizren, Ottoman Empire (modern Kosovo)
- Died: 1572 (aged 52); Üsküb, Ottoman Empire (modern Skopje, North Macedonia)
- Resting place: Gazi Baba, Skopje
- Writing career
- Language: Ottoman Turkish
- Genres: Tezkire, Diwan Poetry
- Notable work: Senses of Poets (Meşairü'ş-Şuara)

Pir Mehmed ("Mehmed the Pir"; 1520–1572), better known as Aşık Çelebi ("Gentleman Bard" in Turkish), was an Ottoman biographer, poet, and translator. Born in Prizren in Kosovo, he served as kadi (judge) in many towns of the Rumelia. His major work Senses of Poets (Meşairü'ş-Şuara) of 1568 is of major importance.

== Life and work ==
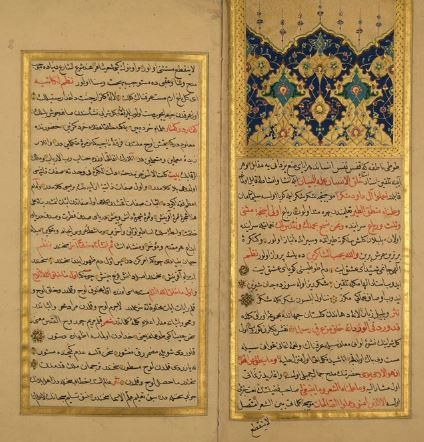
Senses of Poets

Çelebi was born in Prizren,^{[a]} Ottoman Empire. His birth name was Pir Mehmed, and he descended from a Turkish seyyid family. After his father's death in 1535 (941 in Ottoman calendar) he departed for Filibe and later for Istanbul. He studied in a medrese in Istanbul under the best tutors of his time and received an excellent education. His first civil servant position was as a court secretary in Bursa. There he was also a trustee of a vakif. He returned to Istanbul in 1546. There he obtained a clerical position of justice with the help of his tutor Emir Gisu. He applied for the position of the head cleric of the Imperial Council left vacant after the death of Receb Çelebi, but did not succeed, following with accepting a position as a cleric at the Fatwa Office.
After that he would work in many cities of Rum as a judge, such as Pristina, Servia, Arta, Kratovo, Nikopol, Rousse, etc. In overall, he failed to get the position of his dreams which his father and grandfather had, the Nakibü'l-eşraf (MP, representative Sayyid and Sharif of the Empire).

He translated into Turkish many poetry of prose works from Ottoman writers, originally in Arabic.
His main work is Meşairü'ş-şuara (Senses of Poets), a tezkire (bibliographical dictionary of poets and poetry). It was published in 1568 and is an excellent source not only on the life and work of Ottoman poets, but also on social life and customs of the scholar-bureaucrat cast (to which he belonged) of Istanbul of those times. He completed it while working as a kadi in Kratovo, and presented it to the Sultan Selim II in 1568. 30 copies have been encountered which makes it the second most read tezkire of all times after that of Latifî (1491-1582) with 91 copies. It covers 427 poets, in poetry or prose.
Among many example of his poems, the majority are placed strategically rather than for decoration purpose. Once a selected few exhibit his poetic skills. He used the rest (majority) to convey feelings of hardship, joy, and desire.
Aşık was part of the shared culture of the Ottomans of the 16th century. His work in Arabic translations shows high proficiency and intrinsic gasp of the language. He shows himself in various situation as a master in Persian. To this is added his vast knowledge on the Ottoman literature.

Aşık lived for many years as a kadi in Üsküb where he died in 1571 or 1572. He is buried there, which coincides in today's Gazi Baba Municipality. His türbe is known as Aşık Çelebi Türbe. It was severally damaged during the 1963 earthquake and was not repaired or reconstructed by the Yugoslav authorities. Today, only a few ruins remain.

== See also ==
- Alevism
- Suzi Çelebi of Prizren

== Notes ==
a.	E.J.W.Gibb mentions that both Latifî and Kınalızâde Hasan Çelebi describe Aşık Çelebi as "a native of Bursa". Riyazi, who came later, states in his Riyazü'ş Şuara that Çelebi was from Rumelia. Today's scholars accept Prizren as place of birth.
