= Chalabi, Iran =

Chalabi or Chalbi (Persian: چلبي) in Iran may refer to:

- Chalabi, Kermanshah
- Chalbi, Markazi
