= Hüseyin Çelebi =

Kurdish writer and PKK member

Huseyin Çelebî was a pioneer of the Association of Students from Kurdistan (YXK) in Europe and a writer. His mother was Turkish and his father was Kurdish.

Following the Dersim Massacre in 1938, his family emigrated to central Anatolia. Later, they emigrated again to Istanbul before eventually moving to Germany in the 1960s.

He was born to a family from Dersim in 1967 in the city of Hamburg in Germany to a Turkish mother and a Kurdish father. He attended high school in Hamburg, and then went to the Fachoberschule for Social Pedagogy and started his studies at the beginning of 1986.

Because of his father's political activism, Çelebî became interested in politics. At the age of 7, he went with his father and a family friend to a demonstration against the deportation of 169 Kurds from Turkey to Saddam Hussein’s Iraq.

Çelebi was one of the first members of the Kurdistan Students’ Union (YXK) in Europe.

In 1988 he was arrested and prosecuted in the Kurdish Trial in Düsseldorf for membership of the Kurdistan Workers' Party (PKK), and in 1990 he was released. Huseyin Celebi joined the Kurdistan Freedom Movement in the summer of 1991, and was killed in 1992.

== Legacy ==
The Huseyin Çelebî Literature and Poetry Festival has been organised by the Kurdistan Students’ Union (Yekîtiya Xwendekarên Kurdistan - YXK) since 1993.

The 2017 Huseyin Çelebî Literature and Poetry Festival in London was dedicated to the memory of the British-Kurdish filmmaker Mehmet Aksoy, and was the first time the festival was held outside of Turkey.

== Resources ==
Biography in German at the YXK web page
