= Nilgün Çelebi =

Turkish academic (born 1950)

Nilgün Celebi
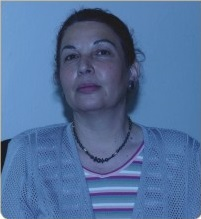
- Born: September 13, 1950; Konya, Turkey
- Occupations: Professor of general sociology and methodology

Nilgün Çelebi (born 1950) is a Turkish academic.

== Career ==
She studied sociology at the Hacettepe University in Ankara and worked as Professor of General Sociology and Methodology at the Department of Sociology, at the University of Ankara and the University of Mugla. She is interested in the linkage between ontological and epistemological-methodological approaches in sociology, the logic of science, conceptualizations, the concept of socius, the role of adjectives and cultural peculiarities, women's entrepreneurship.

She has published several books and articles mostly in Turkish.

== References and selected books ==
- Sosyoloji Notlari, Published by Ani, Ankara, 2007, ISBN 9789944474207
- Sosyoloji ve Metodoloji Yazilari, published by Ani, Ankara, 2004, ISBN 9756956542
- Turizm Sektöründeki Küçük İşyeri Örgütlerinde Kadin Girişimciler, published by TC.Başbakanlık Kadinin Statüsü ve Sorunlari Genel Müdürlügü, Ankara, 1997, ISBN 9751919010
- Bagımsız İşyeri Sahibi Kadinların Aile ve Iş Ilişkileri, Published by TC Başbakanlik Kadin ve Sosyal Hizmetler Müsteşarligi, Ankara, 1993, ISBN 9751907853
- http://www.goodreads.com/author/show/6903074.Nilg_n_elebi
- http://www.ankara.edu.tr/english/bolum.php?bodb=14&alt=2&bodb1=23
