= Kınalızâde Hasan Çelebi =

Ottoman poet and bibliographer (c. 1546 – 1604)

Kınalızâde Hasan Çelebi (c. 1546 – 1604) was an Ottoman poet and bibliographer of the 16th century. His main work is the Tezkiretü'ş-Şuara (Memoirs of the Poets), one of the best known Ottoman tezkires (bibliographical dictionary of poets and poetry).

== Life ==
Hasan was born in the year 993 of the Islamic calendar, which started on 4 March 1546. He was the son of Molla Ala al-Din Ali, also known as Ali Çelebi (1510/11 – 1572), an Ottoman jurist and author from Isparta in Anatolia. Hasan was born in Bursa, where his father was posted as a Kadı (judge). He started his work career as a mulasim (assistant, candidate professor) of Abu Suud. In 1567–68, he became professor, in 1582–83 müderris (religious teacher) at the mosque of Mehmed the Conqueror, and five years later professor at the Süleymaniye Mosque. In the Islamic year 999 (1590–91), he started his career as a judge; first in Aleppo, followed by Cairo, Edirne, Cairo again, Bursa (1598-9), Gallipoli, then Eyüp district of Constantinople, and in Eski Zagra (July 1602).
He lived the rest of his life as the owner of an arpalik near Rosetta in Egypt until his death on 15 March 1604.
Hasan's brother Fehmı (died May 1596) was also a well-known poet, although according to the historian Mustafa Âlî neither of the brothers could reach the prestige of their father.

== Poetry ==
His work Tezkiretü'ş-Şuara was the one that made him famous. It was the last of the great bibliographical works on poets of the 16th century. It was structured in three sections. According to Mustafa ben Abd Allah Hadjidji Khalifa, it surpasses all previous works of its kind both in kindness of language and compactness of information which is embedded in it. It was finished in 1586 and dedicated to Hoca Sadeddin Efendi. The tezkire gives information on around 600 poets with specimens of their work. Many manuscripts of it exist.
