= Abro Chelebi =

Ottoman trader and official (died 1676)

Abraham "Abro" Chelebi (died 1676) was an Ottoman-Armenian merchant. Abro Chelebi served as the purveyor of the Ottoman Army from 1644 onwards. Following the execution of his patron Gazi Hüseyin Pasha in 1659, Abro Chelebi was also jailed but managed to survive and continued to serve the government, this time under Köprülü Ahmed Pasha. Abro Chelebi was a major supporter of the cultural life in Constantinople, having funded the copying of manuscripts, and the renovation and construction of churches. He died in 1676. He had two surviving sons, Sarkis (born 1644) and Mateos (1654–1695), who continued the mercantile business of the family.

== Bibliography ==
- Adalian, Rouben (1 June 1980). Tashjian, James H. (ed.). "The Armenian Colony of Egypt During the Reign of Muhammad Ali (1805–1848)". The Armenian Review. 33: 115–144.
- Barsoumian, Hagop Levon (1981). The Armenian Amira Class of Istanbul. Columbia University.
