= Katib =

Arab scribe

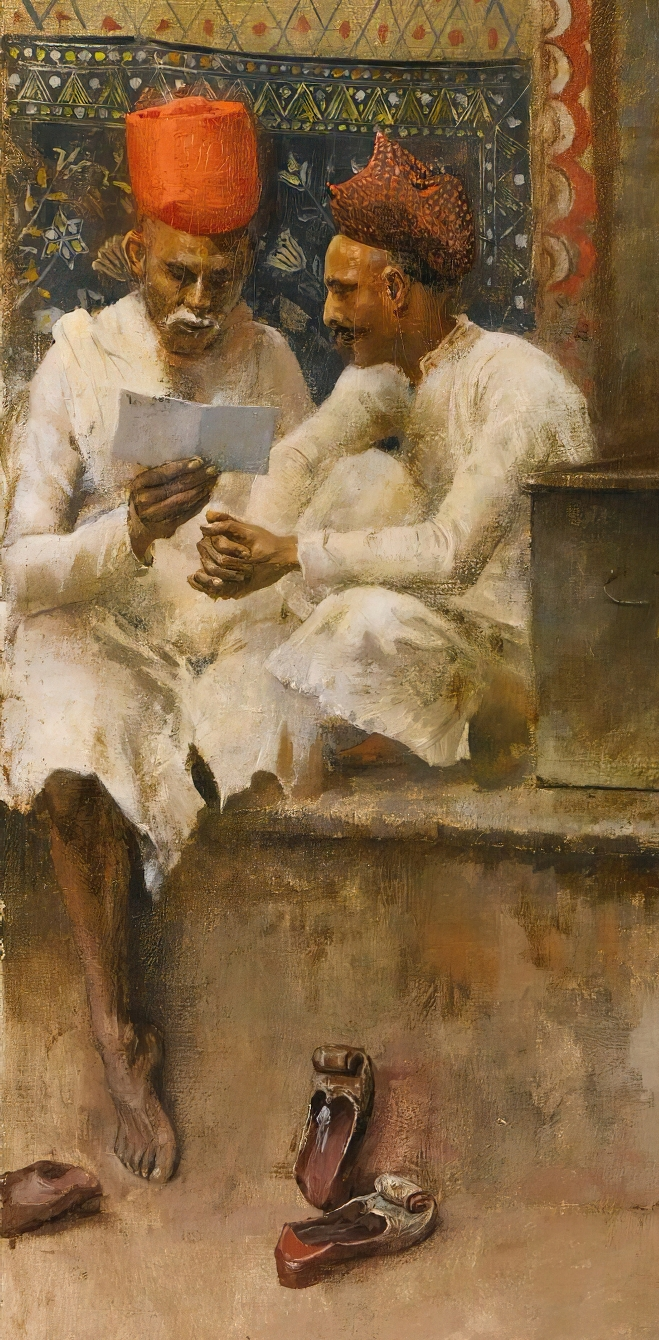
A Katib, in Bombay' by Edwin Lord Weeks

A katib (Arabic: كَاتِب, kātib) is a writer, scribe, or secretary in the Arabic-speaking world, Persian World, and other Islamic areas as far as the Indian subcontinent. In North Africa, the local pronunciation of the term also causes it to be written ketib. Duties comprised reading and writing correspondence, issue instructions at the command of the person in charge and archiving documentation.

The word comes probably from Arabic kitāb (book), and perhaps imported from the Northern Aramaic neighbors of the Arabs. It is a pre-Islamic concept, encountered in the work of ancient Arab poets. The art of writing, although present in all parts of Arabia, was apparently accomplishment of the few. Among the Companions of Medina, about ten are mentioned as katibs. With the embrace of Islam, the office of katib became a post of great honor. By this time, on the model of the Persian chancellery, a complicated system of government offices had developed, each branch of governmental, religious, civic, or military entity had its own katib. Thus, the term became widely encountered in conjunction with other words in order to derive a more specific secretary position, i.e. katib dīwān - secretary in the financial bureaus, katib al-sirr - chancellery secretary or chief-secretary, katib al-djaysh - secretary of the army, and so on.

It was used in the Ottoman Empire with the same meaning, i.e. Kiaya Katibi - private secretary of the Kiaya bey, and thus transferred to other languages, i.e. qatib and qatip in Albanian.

== See also ==
- Kâtibim – a Turkish song dedicated to a katib.
- Arabi katibi
- List of Ottoman titles and appellations
