= Bob Sredersas =

Lithuanian-Australian art collector (1910–1982)

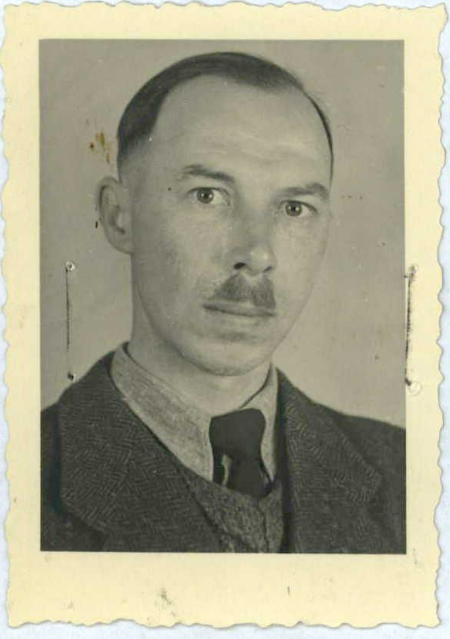
Sredersas in 1950

Bob Sredersas (born Bronius Šredersas; 4 December 1910 – 26 May 1982) was a Lithuanian-Australian art collector. Sredersas came to prominence after donating his private art collection of over 100 works to the City of Wollongong. The collection, which included pieces by artists such as Arthur Streeton, Grace Cossington Smith, Margaret Preston and Norman Lindsay, assisted in establishing the Wollongong Art Gallery.

After his death, details of Sredersas's involvement with the Sicherheitsdienst (SD) in Nazi-occupied Lithuania were publicised and have led to questions surrounding his legacy.

== Life in Lithuania ==
Sredersas was born in Simferopol, Crimea on 4 December 1910 to a middle-class family and grew up in Lithuania. After graduation from a high school in Ukmergė in 1933, he worked as a police officer for the Lithuanian Department of Security in the criminal section. In 1938, he attended training on informative news and a three-month chemical defense course. He worked on the surveillance of Soviet military movements.

It was previously believed that following the Soviet occupation of Lithuania in 1940, Sredersas stopped his police work. At risk from both Nazi and Soviet occupiers, he fled for Germany where he worked as a labourer. Sredersas himself was often unwilling to talk about his past. Documents uncovered after 2018, however, showed Sredersas had been employed by the SD in Kaunas, acquired German citizenship and had lodged an application to join the SS. After assessing the documents, Efraim Zuroff, of the Simon Wiesenthal Centre, said Sredersas "was an active participant in enforcing German directives and orders, and most likely was able to join the Waffen-SS, where he very likely participated in Holocaust crimes."

21st-century research by historian Konrad Kwiet found that Srederas worked as an intelligence officer in the Sicherheitsdienst from June 1941 to January 1945. He changed his name to Bronislaus Schroeders, but went back to using his Lithuanian name after World War II. Kwiet suspected that Sredersas can be identified as the SS leader from other historical research who participated in the capture and murder of an escaped Jewish prisoner in 1943. Due to the uncertainty around the incident, Kwiet was reluctant to publicise the information. According to Kwiet, Sredersas may have led a Hitler Youth group to a forest to capture the escapee after which the Jewish person was taken to a police station and murdered. Kwiet believed that this event could have led to criminal charges for accessory to murder.

== Life in Australia ==
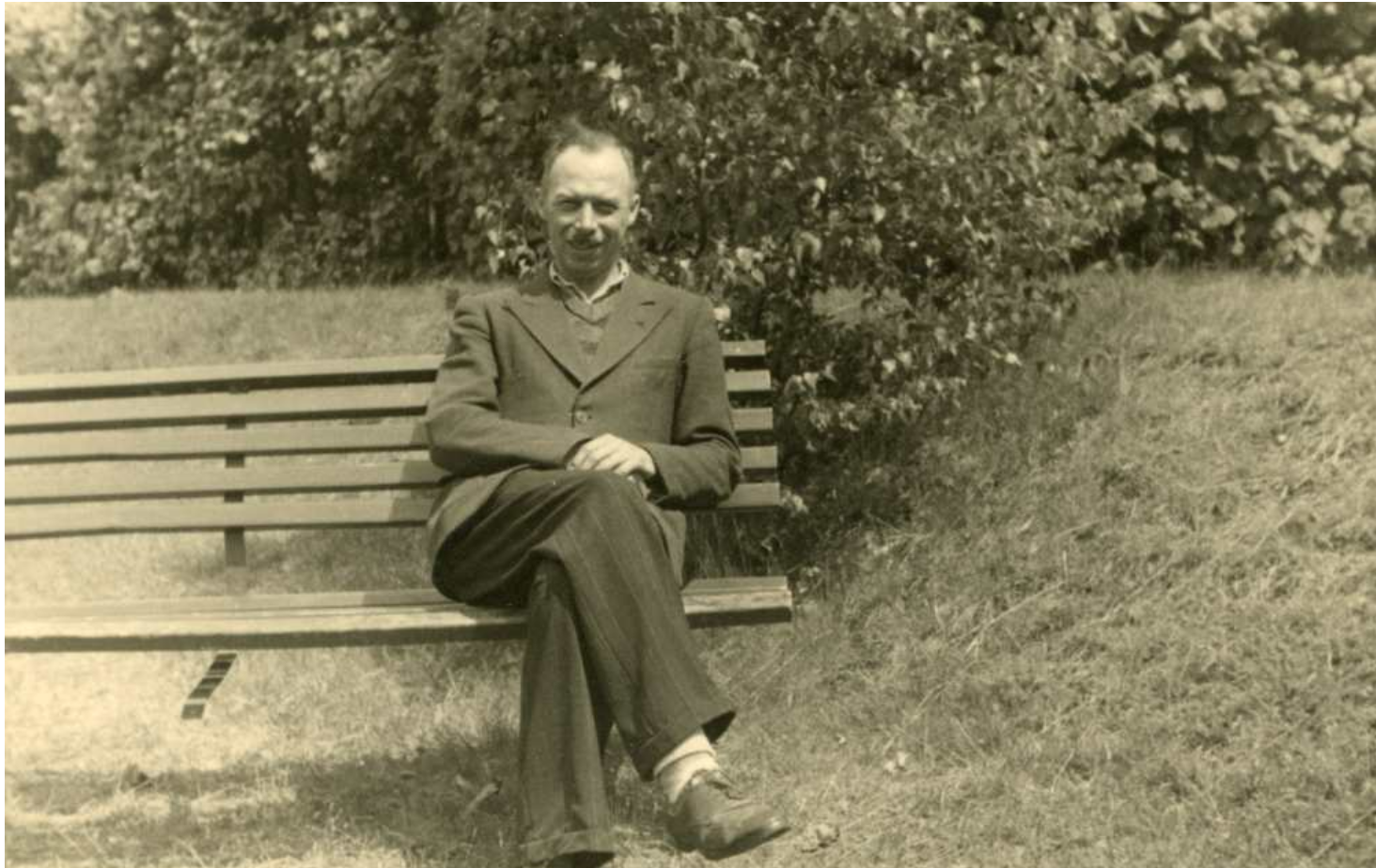
Sredersas in Australia in 1950

After the war, Sredersas was registered as a displaced person in Flensburg, Germany. Sredersas sailed to Australia abroad SS Fairsea in 1950 and was temporarily housed in the Bonegilla Migrant Reception and Training Centre. He later settled in Wollongong. His immigration documentation gave his profession as farm labourer and stated that he was not a police officer or soldier. He worked as a labourer then later as a crane driver at Port Kembla steelworks in Illawarra. Sredersas used the name "Bob" in Australia for convenience and to avoid the chance of spelling mistakes. He later told a journalist: "My life began when I came to Australia." In contrast to the other steelworkers, Sredersas took no interest in sport or spending time or money at the pub. Instead, he spent his time gardening at his one-bedroom fibro cottage in Cringila and fishing. In 1956, Sredersas began his art collecting by purchasing a 1917 watercolor, Herring Fleet at Sea St Ives, by Sydney Long at auction for one guinea. This demonstrated to Sredersas the affordability of high quality art works in Australia. He used McCulloch's Encyclopedia of Australian Art to assist with his buying and spent much of his time-off at Sydney auction houses. In his home, the walls were full of art, so paintings had to be stored under his bed and stacked on cupboards.

Sredersas's home was broken into in 1977 and 13 works of art, including carved ivory, were stolen. The break-in influenced his decision to leave his collection to the people of the City of Wollongong. The bequest compelled the council to open an art gallery in order to display the art. Sredersas said, "I have nobody but the people of Wollongong to leave [the artworks] to."

Sredersas never married and was remembered for living a simple life. He died in 1982.

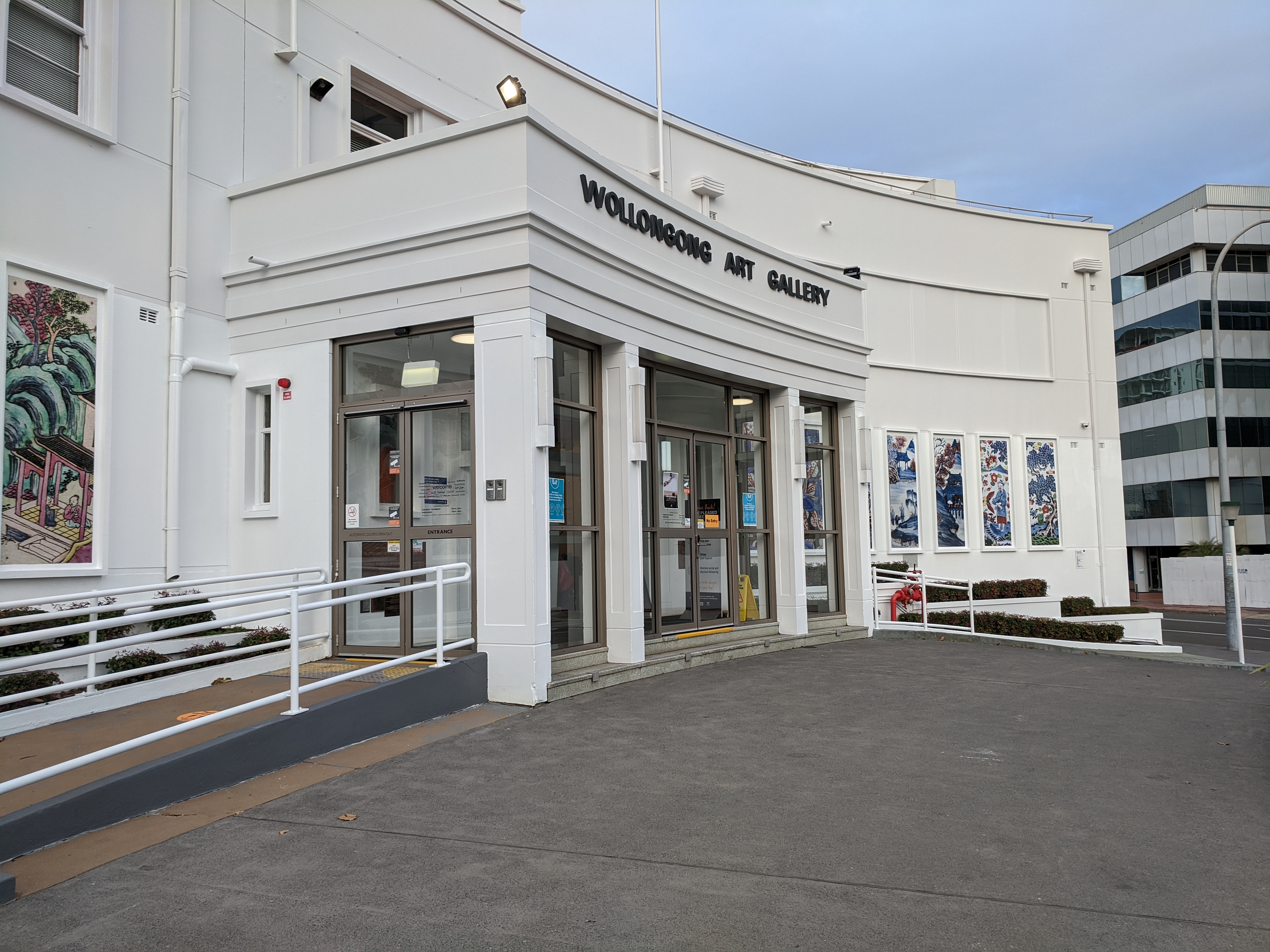
Wollongong Art Gallery, where Sredersas's collection is now homed

As a result of his philanthropy, Sredersas was honoured with guest lectures, an exhibition space and several exhibitions in his name.

== Reaction to war-time activities ==
In 2018, documents emerged around Sredersas's involvement with the Nazi Party and possibly the Holocaust. In January 2022, the City of Wollongong council were made aware of this documentation. The council said it was inappropriate for them to comment on the allegations. A spokesperson stated that "standard industry processes were followed for the donation of these artworks. As a result, these artworks were accepted in good faith." Gordon Bradbery, Lord Mayor of Wollongong, noted the concerning nature of the allegations and stated his disconcertment by the lack of action by the council.

In April 2022, the council engaged Sydney Jewish Museum to carry out an investigation, led by historian and Holocaust survivor Konrad Kwiet, into Sredersas's association with the Nazi party. In June 2022, following Kwiet's findings that Sredersas served as a Nazi intelligence officer from 1941 to 1945, Wollongong Art Gallery removed a plaque honouring Sredersas.

== Art collection ==
Sredersas donated 76 or 88 paintings, 31 pieces of china, 11 artefacts from New Guinea, and 11 miniatures. The bequest has been nicknamed "The Gift" by the media and was valued at $1.5 million in 1990. The collection included works by the following artists:

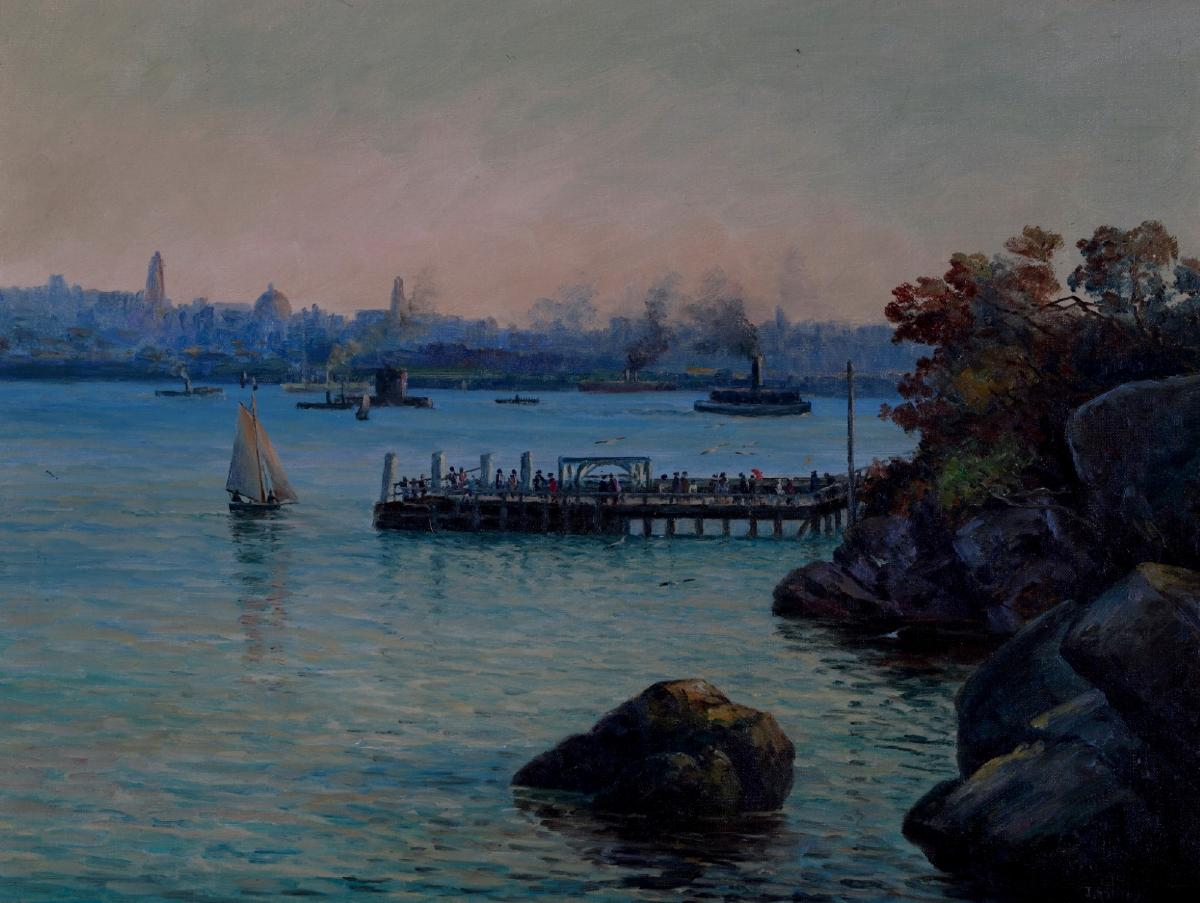
Wharf by James Ashton, gifted by Sredersas to the City of Wollongong in 1978

- James Ashton
- Will Ashton
- Arthur Boyd
- Rupert Bunny
- Ernest Buckmaster
- Nicholas Chevalier
- Antonio Dattilo Rubbo
- A.H. Fullwood
- James Gleeson
- Pro Hart
- Hans Heysen
- James Ranalph Jackson
- Michael Kmit
- Fred Leist
- Norman Lindsay
- Sydney Long
- Margaret Preston
- Grace Cossington Smith
- Arthur Streeton
- Henri Tebbitt

== See also ==
- Australian art
