= Konrad Kwiet =

- Born: May 29, 1941 (age 85); Swindemünde, Germany
- Occupation: history professor
- Known for: historian of the holocaust

Konrad Kwiet (born May 29, 1941) is a historian and scholar of the Holocaust. He is currently Pratt Foundation Professor at the University of Sydney and Resident Historian at the Sydney Jewish Museum. He has worked in universities, museums and research centres around the world, including Heidelberg, Israel, Washington, D.C., Oxford and Berlin.

== Career ==
Konrad Kwiet was born in Swinemünde in 1941 and educated in Amsterdam and Berlin. He studied history at Technische Universität Berlin, completing his PhD on Nazi policy in the Netherlands. Kwiet emigrated to Australia in 1976 to take up a lecturing position at the University of New South Wales. He retired as emeritus professor from Macquarie University in 2000 and is currently Pratt Foundation Professor for Jewish History and Holocaust Studies at the University of Sydney. From 1987 to 1994, he was chief historical consultant to the Special Investigations Unit investigating Nazi war criminals in Australia, set up after research by the journalist Mark Aarons.

Kwiet has appeared regularly in the Australian media to comment on historical debates and events, such as the Daniel Goldhagen debate, the work of Simon Wiesenthal, the Holocaust, and genocide.

In 2022, Kwiet was put in charge of an investigation into the Nazi connections of Lithuanian-Australian art collector Bob Sredersas. Kwiet has identified himself in a USC Shoah Foundation testimony as a Jewish Holocaust survivor.

== Books ==
- Contemporary Responses to the Holocaust (2004, together with J Matthaeus)
- Einsatz im Reichkommissariat Ostland (1998, together with W Benz and J Matthaeus)
- Selbstbehauptung und Widerstand (1984, together with H Eschwege)
- Reichskommissariat Niederlande (1968)
- Ausbildungsziel Judenmord? (2003, together with J. Matthaueus, J. Foerster and R. Breitman)
