= Church of St. Peter and St. Paul, Ukmergė =

Catholic church in Ukmergė, Lithuania built in 1820

Church of St. Peter and St. Paul Šv. apaštalų Petro ir Povilo bažnyčia
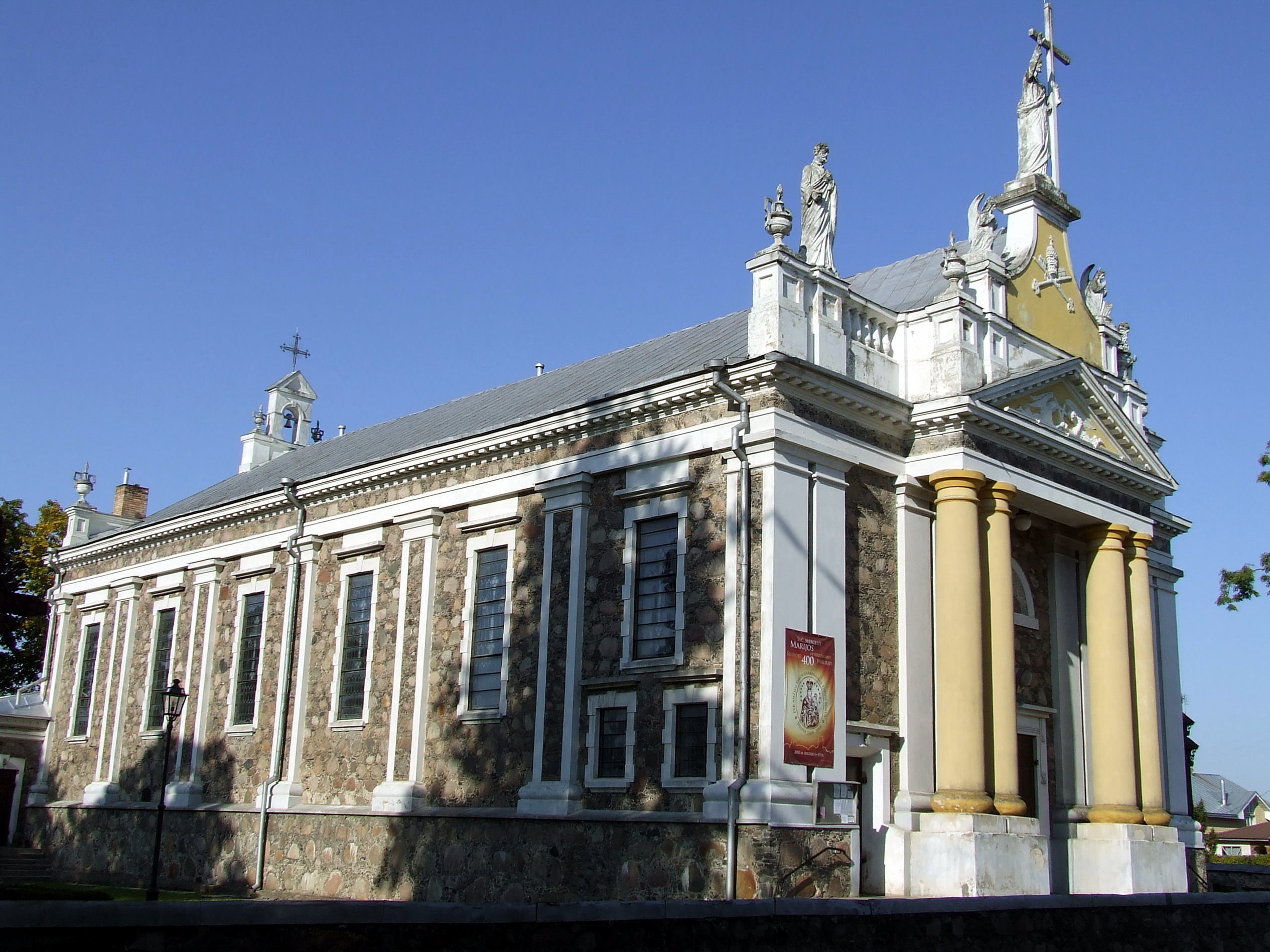
- Façade of the church in 2008

Religion
- Affiliation: Catholic Church
- Leadership: Roman Catholic Archdiocese of Kaunas

Location
- Location: Ukmergė, Lithuania
- Interactive map of Church of St. Peter and St. Paul; Šv. apaštalų Petro ir Povilo bažnyčia
- Coordinates: 55°15′12″N 24°46′0″E

Architecture
- Architect: Wacław Michniewicz
- Type: Church
- Style: Neoclassicism with features of Baroque
- Completed: 1820

Website
- Kn.parapija.lt

The Church of St. Peter and St. Paul (Lithuanian: Šv. apaštalų Petro ir Povilo bažnyčia) is a Catholic church in Ukmergė, Lithuania. The construction of the church was funded by donations of the parishioners and lasted for twenty years (1800–1820) on the site of an earlier parish church. The church was rebuilt in the years 1894–1896 and 1931–1939 by Wacław Michniewicz. It is a three-aisled, towerless structure built of fieldstone.

== Gallery ==
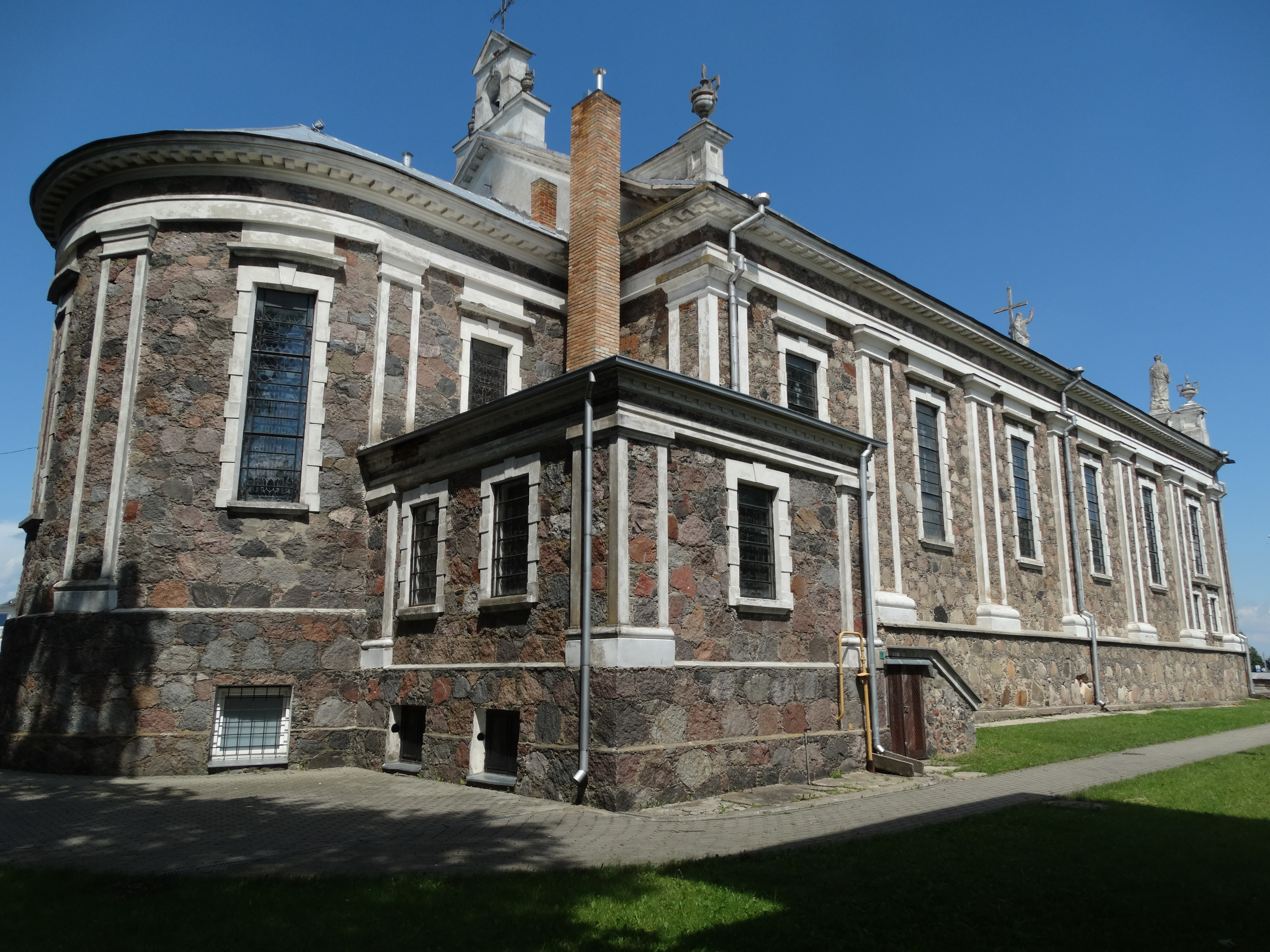
Back view of the church

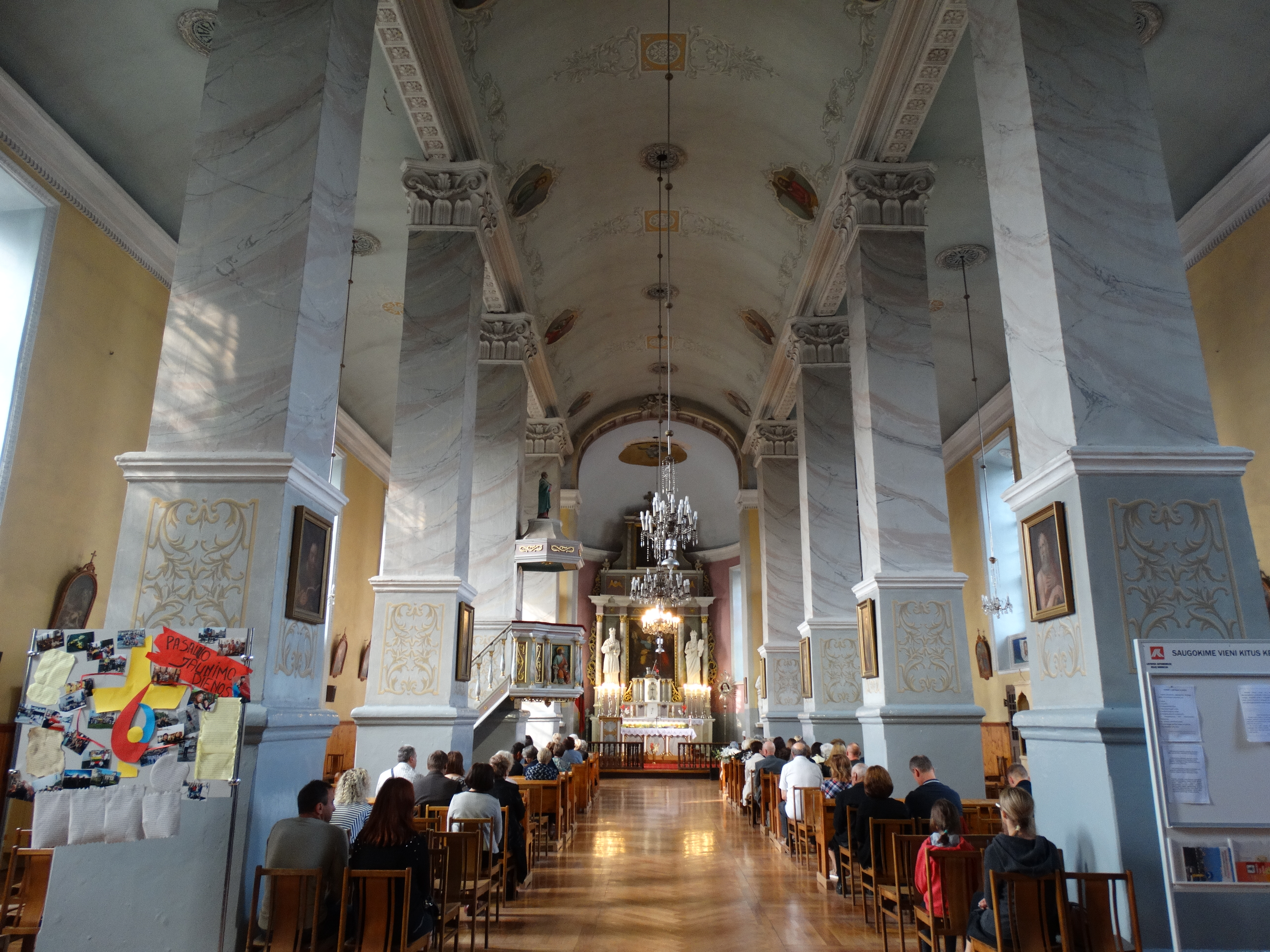
Interior of the church towards the central altar

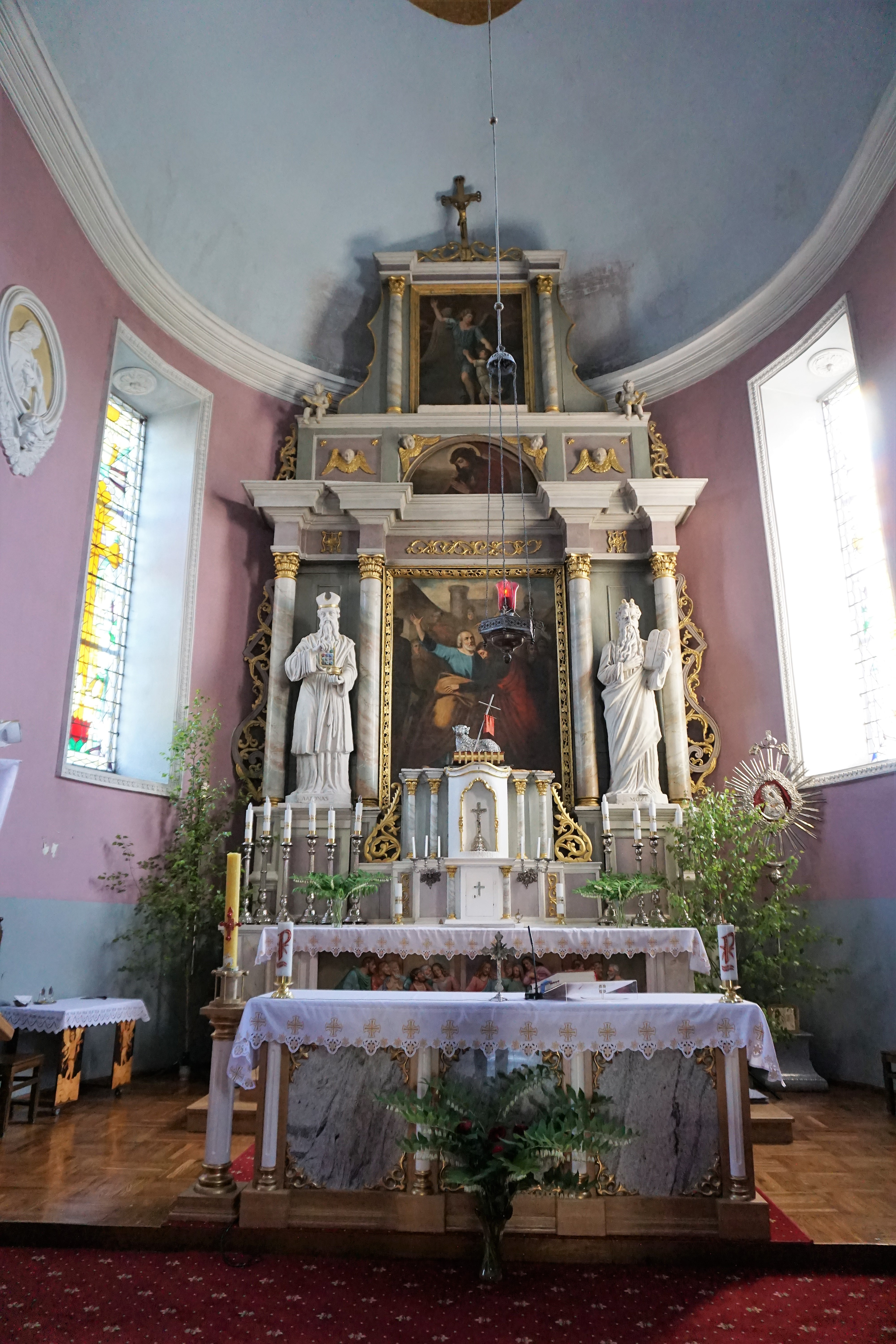
Central altar

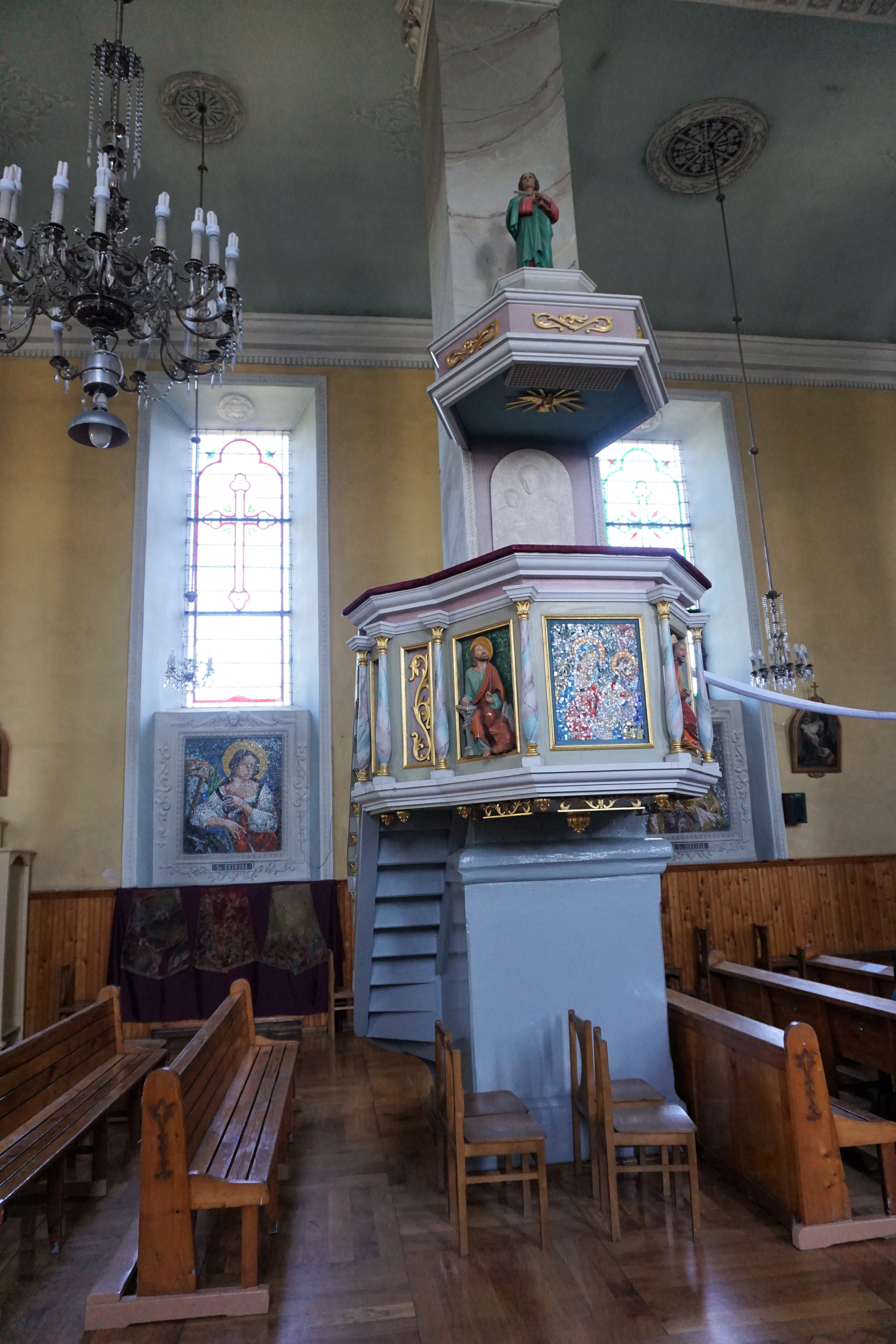
Pulpit

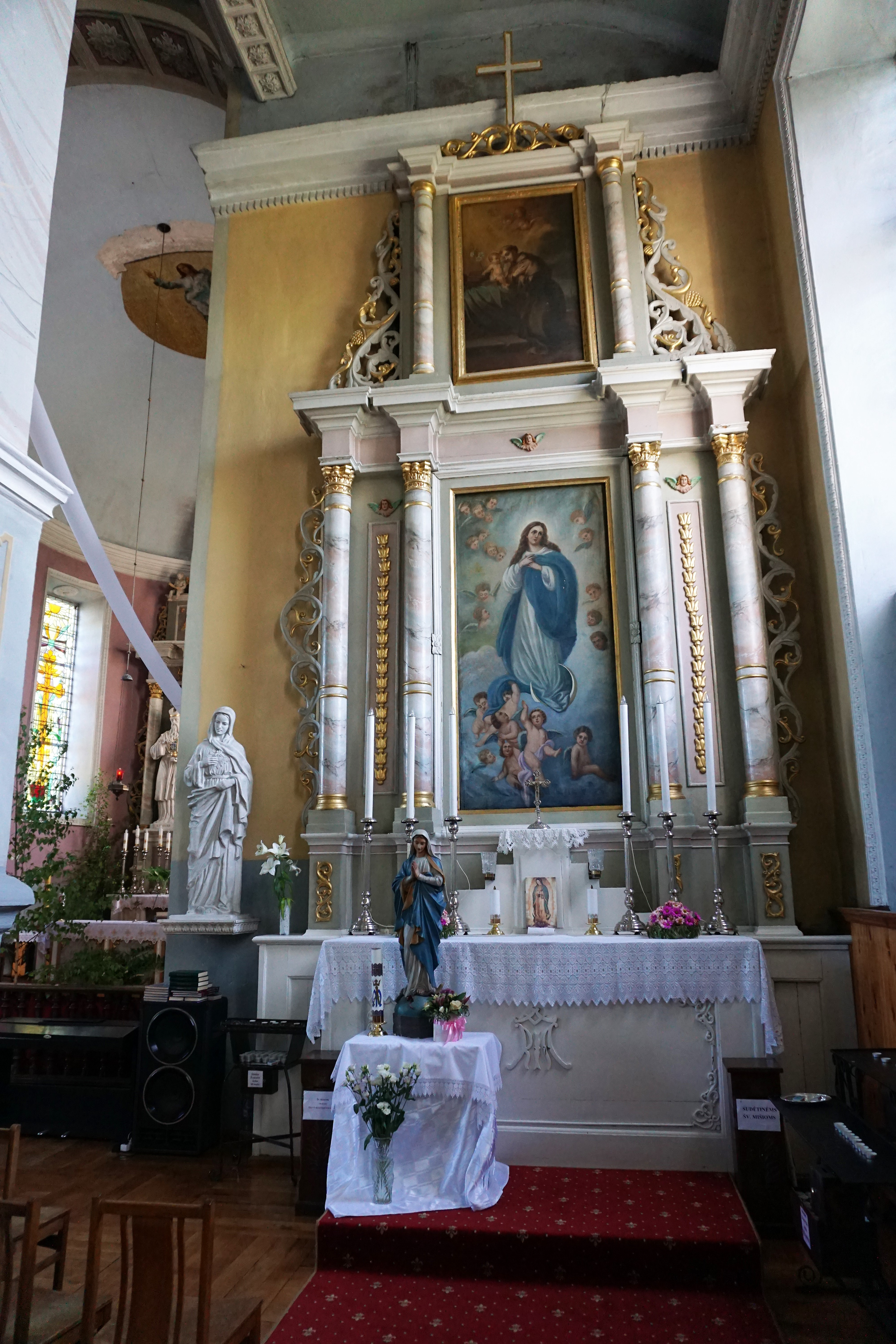
Right-side altar

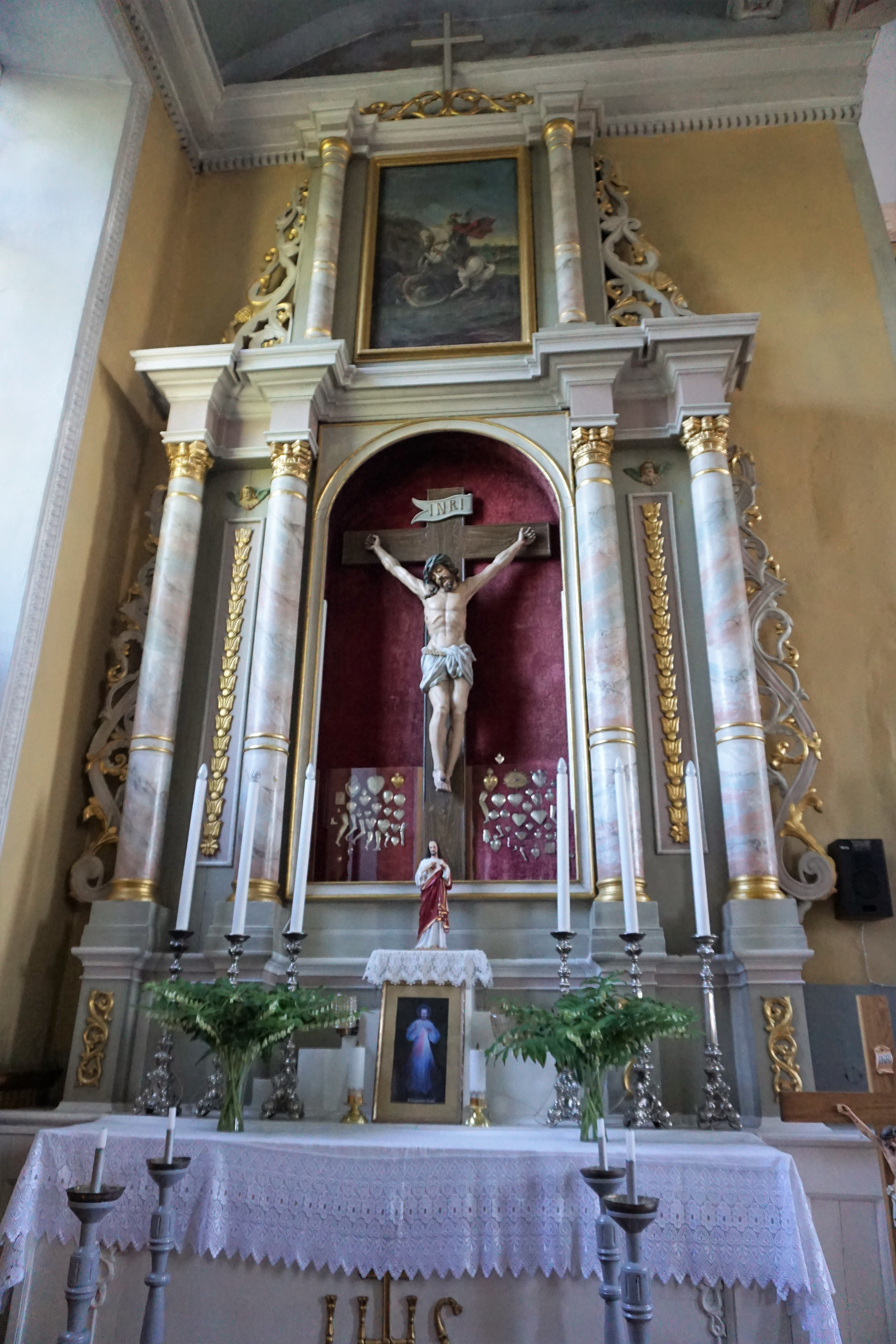
Left-side altar
