= Alexander Braudo =

Russian-Lithuanian-British Jewish author and publisher

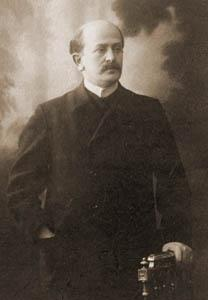
Image of Alexander Braudo

Alexander Braudo (Russian: Александр Исаевич Браудо; Aleksandr Isaevich Braudo; 1864 in Vilkomir, Kovno Governorate – 1924 in London) was Russian-Lithuanian-British Jewish author and publisher.

From 1889 until 1892 he was reviewer of literature on Russian history for the Jahresbericht der Geschichtswissenschaft and the Istoricheskoye Obozrenie, published by the University of St. Petersburg; he translated sources for Russian history, as Grevenbruch's Tragoedia Moscovitica, 1606 (history of the false Dmitri); and Neuville's Relation Curieuse, 1689 (history of the riot of the Streltsy). He wrote a number of articles in Russki Bibliograficheski Slovar, published by the Historical Society of the University of St. Petersburg, and a series of reviews in the Zhurnal Ministerstva Narodnavo Prosvyeshcheniya.

In the Voskhod for 1896 there appeared his reviews of the works of Bershadski on the history of the Jews. While secretary of the Society for the Promotion of Education Among the Jews of Russia, he succeeded in directing the activity of that organization toward the encouragement and development of elementary education among the Jews. He was member of the advisory board of the Jewish Colonization Association.
