= Ukmergė =

Town in Aukštaitija Region, Lithuania

- City
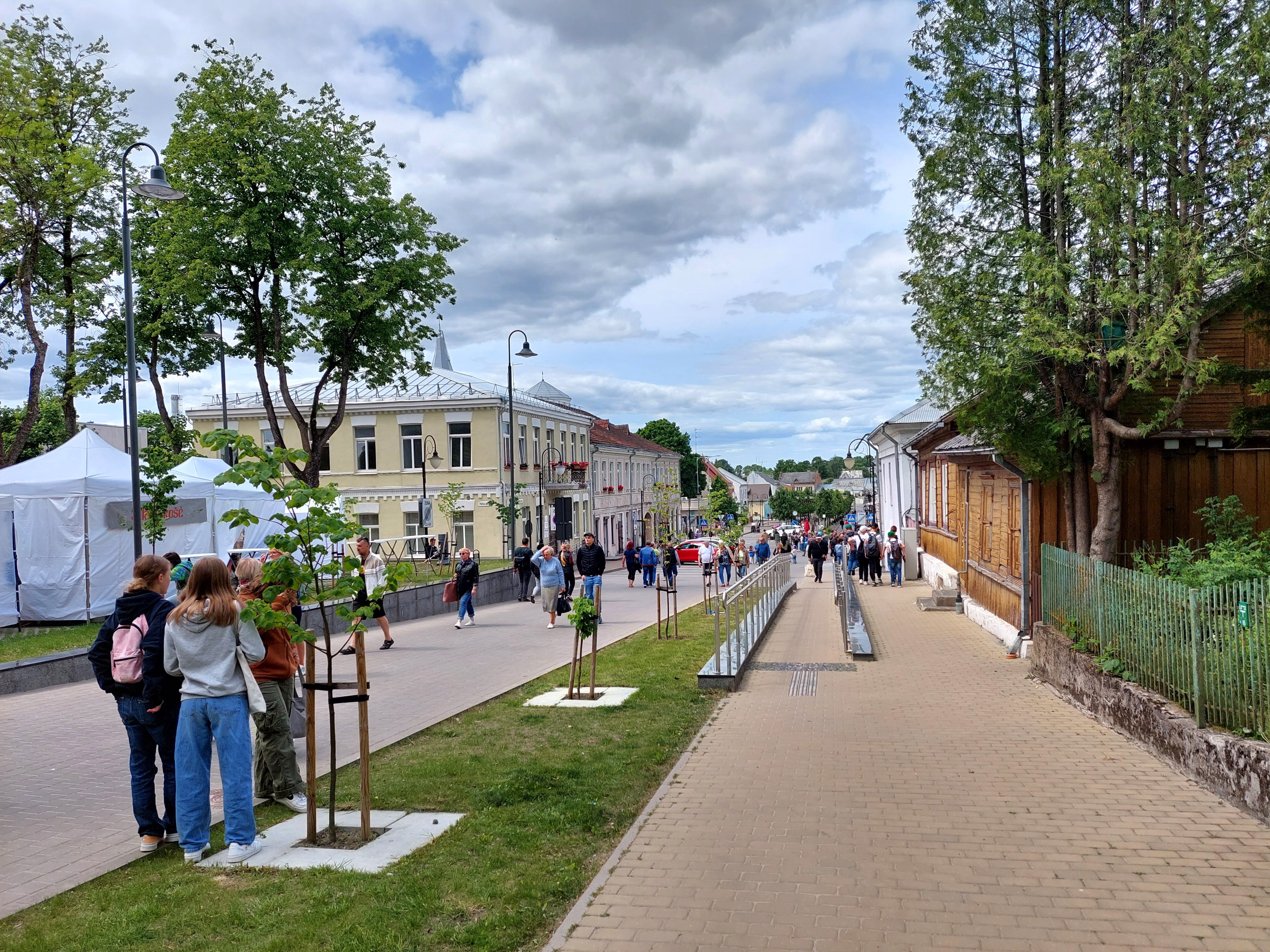
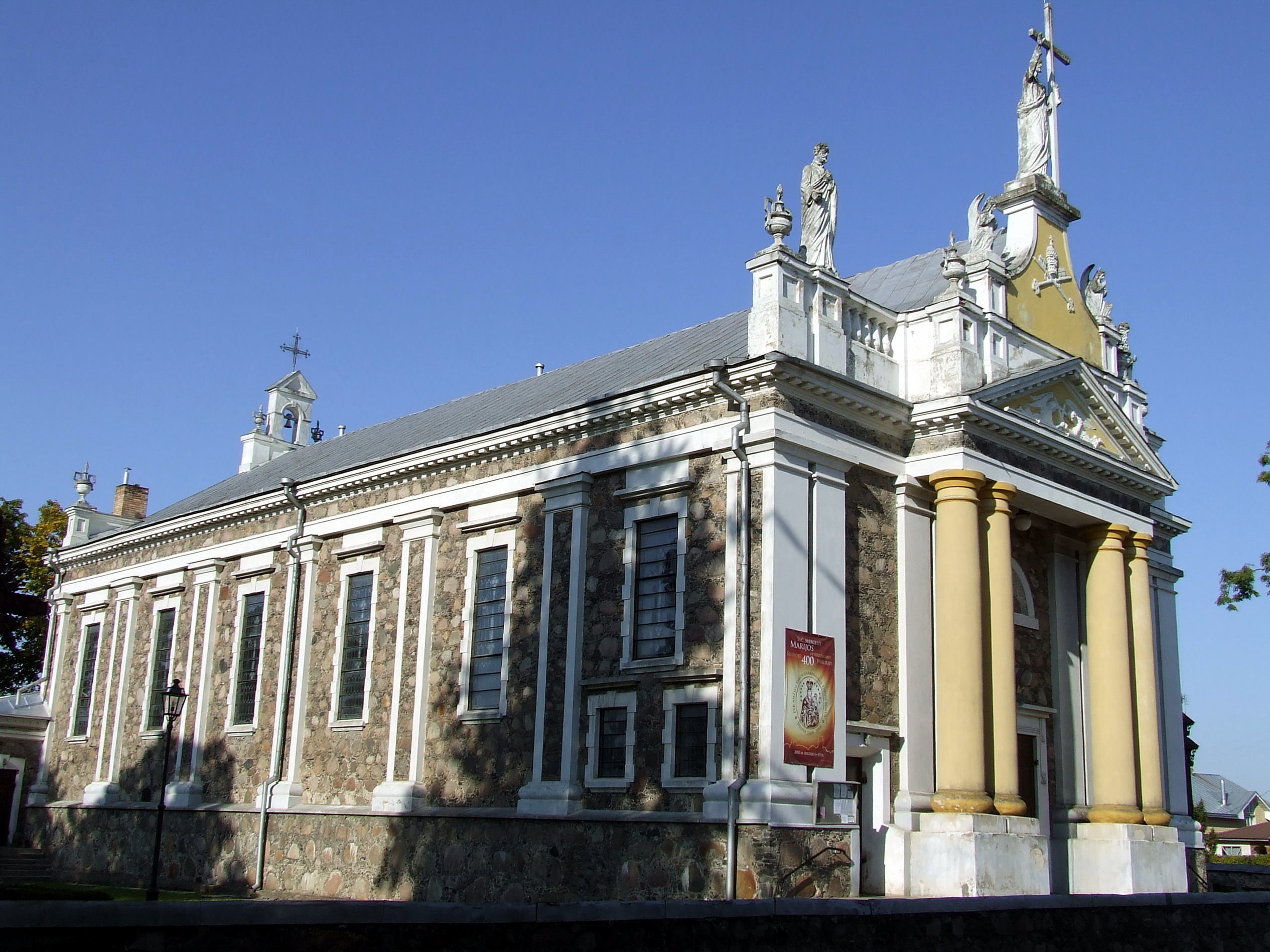
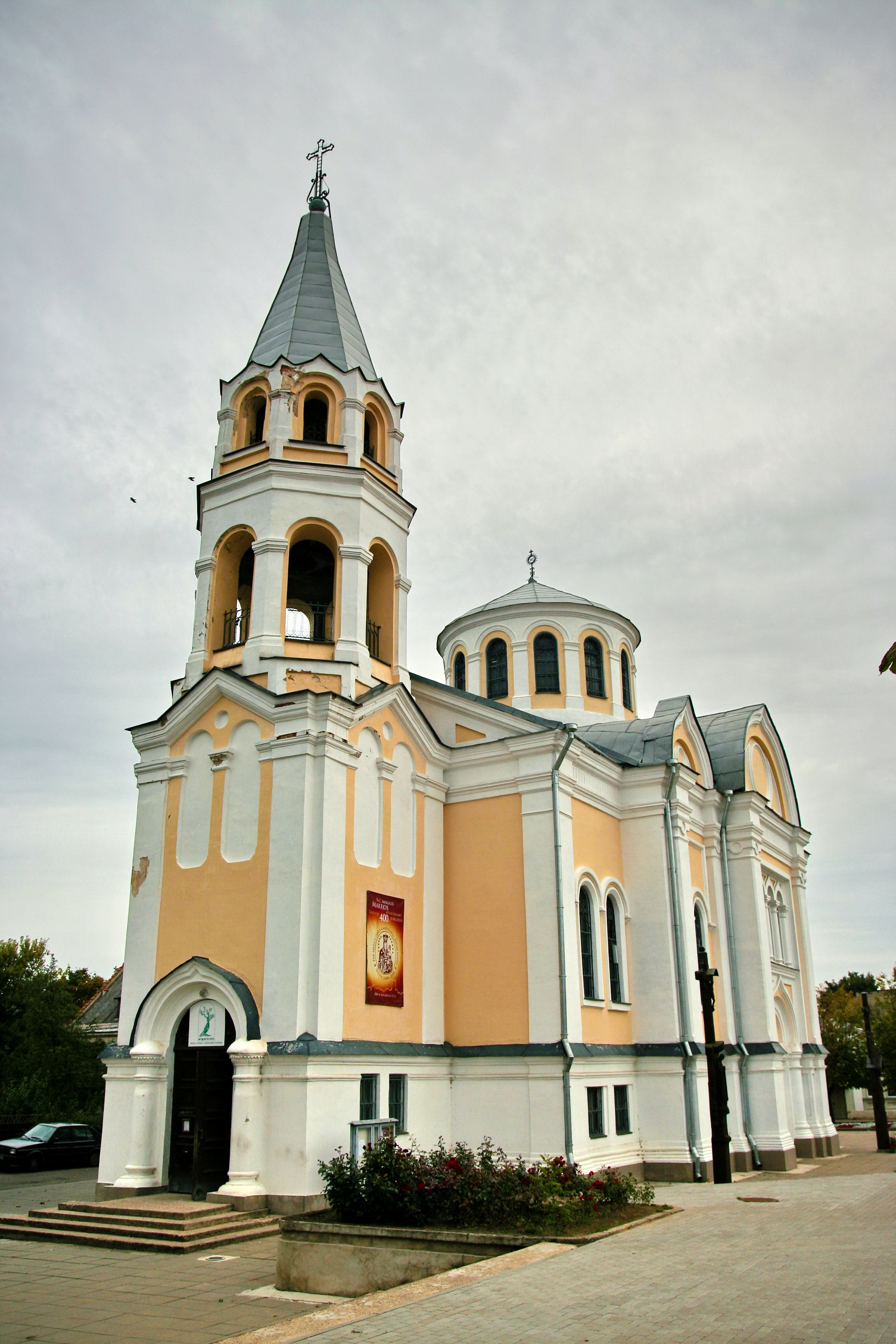
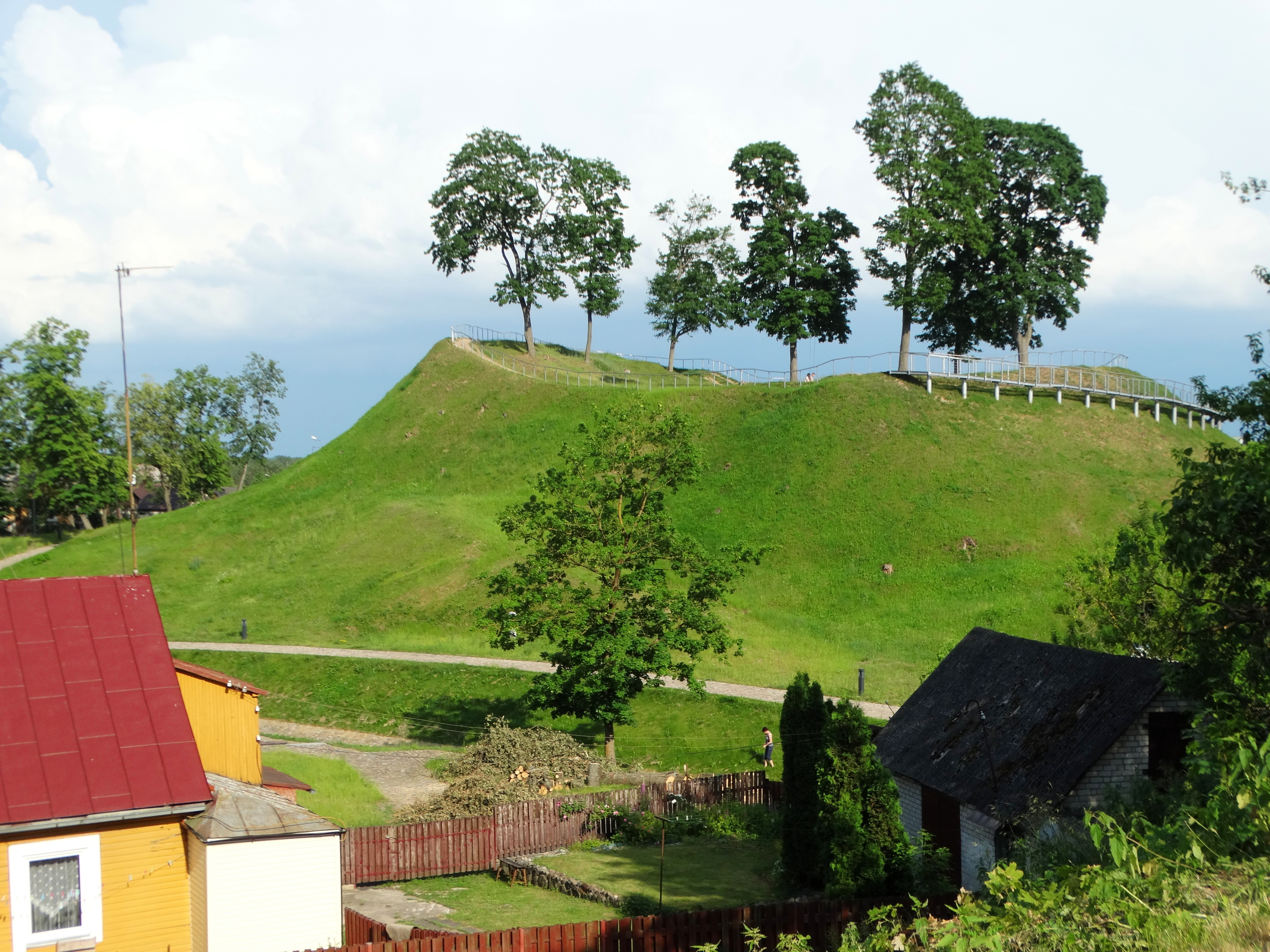
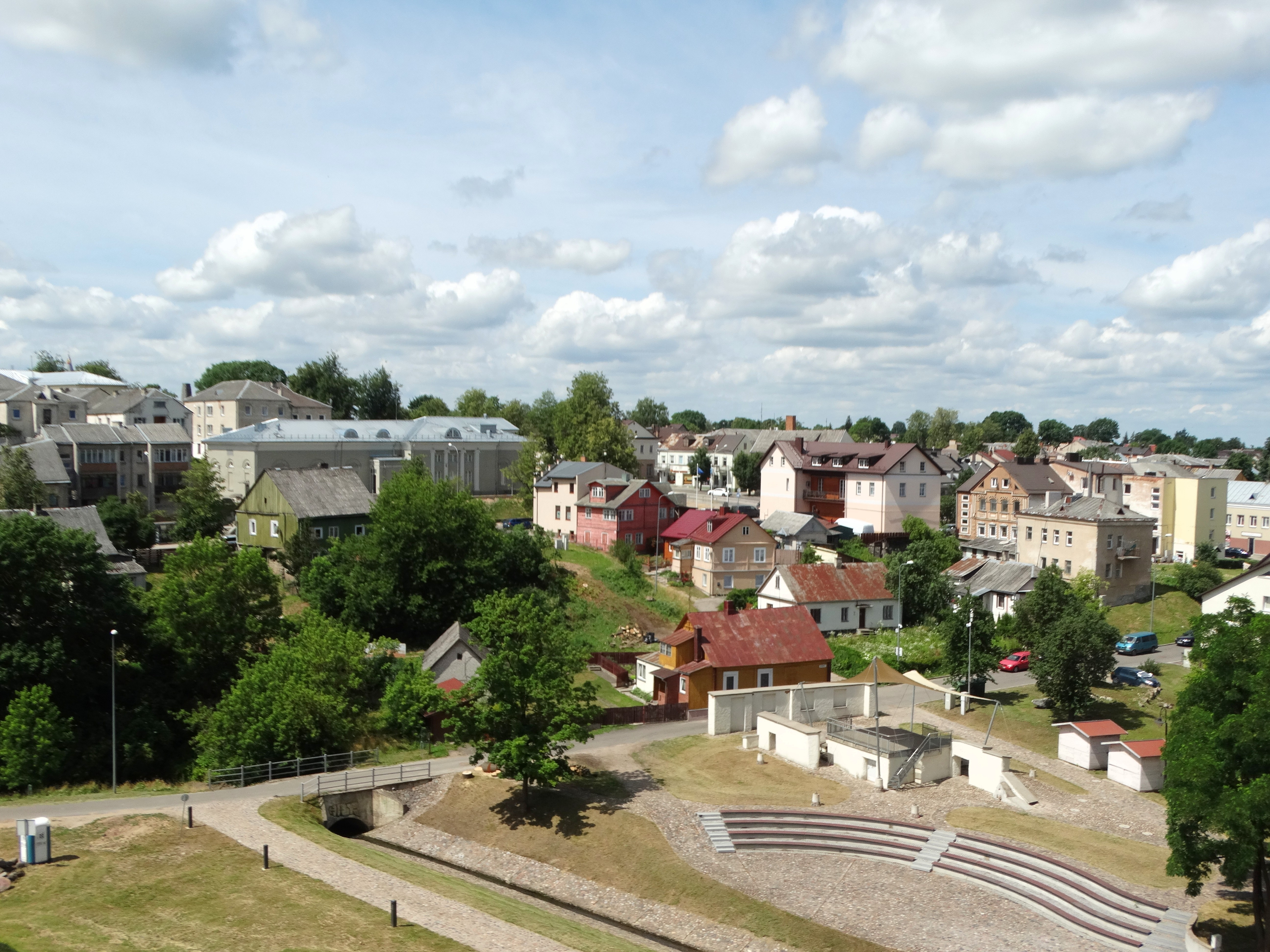
- Pakalnės St. of the Ukmergė Old Town Church of St. Peter and St. Paul Church of the Holy Trinity Ukmergė Hillfort Antanas Smetona Gymnasium Aerial view of the Ukmergė Old Town

- Flag Coat of arms Brandmark

- Location of Ukmergė
- Coordinates: 55°15′N 24°45′E
- Country: Lithuania
- Ethnographic region: Aukštaitija
- County: Vilnius County
- Municipality: Ukmergė district municipality
- Eldership: Ukmergė town eldership
- Capital of: Ukmergė district municipality Ukmergė town eldership Pivonija eldership
- First mentioned: 1333
- Granted city rights: 1486

Area
  - Total: 20.5 km^{2} (7.9 sq mi)
- Elevation: 64 m (210 ft)

Population (2024)
  - Total: 21,990
  - Density: 1,070/km^{2} (2,780/sq mi)
- Demonym(s): Ukmergian(s) (English), ukmergiečiai or ukmergiškiai (Lithuanian)
- Time zone: UTC+2 (EET)
  - Summer (DST): UTC+3 (EEST)
- Postal code: 20xxx
- Website: ukmerge.lt

Ukmergė (previously Vilkmergė; Polish: Wiłkomierz, Russian: Вилькомир, romanized: Vilkomir) is a city in Vilnius County, Lithuania, located 78 km (48 mi) northwest of Vilnius. It is the administrative center of the Ukmergė District Municipality.

Ukmergė (Vilkmergė) was mentioned for the first time as a settlement in 1333. The Ukmergė Old Town contains structure of old streets and squares, also well-preserved buildings of the 19th-20th centuries, and therefore it was included in the Registry of Cultural Property of Lithuania.

== Etymology and variant names ==
The city took its original name Vilkmergė from the Vilkmergėlė River, which was initially called Vilkmergė and assumed a diminutive form after the growth of the settlement. It is commonly thought that the name may be translated as "she-wolf", from the combination of Vilkas (wolf) and Merga (maiden). More likely the second root of the dual-stemmed name is the verb merg-/merk- meaning "to submerge" or "to dip". According to local legend, Vilkmergė was a girl raised by wolves, who bridged the divide between animals and humans, in the same way as Rudyard Kipling's Mowgli. The folk etymology of "Ukmergė", by contrast, is "farm girl" (Lith. ūkis = farm). The original name has been adopted by the local soccer team, "Vilkmergė Ukmergė" as well as popular HBH Vilkmergė beer.

Other historic names for the city include Wilkemerge or Wilkamergen in 1225, Vilkenberge (1333), Wilkinberg (1384, 1455), Vilkomir (1455), Wilkomir (1611), Wilkomirz (1613), Wilkomiria (1766), Ukmerge (1900), Aukmergė (1908); Ūkmergė (1911), Wilkomierz (1918), and Vilkmergė (1919).

== History ==
=== Early history ===
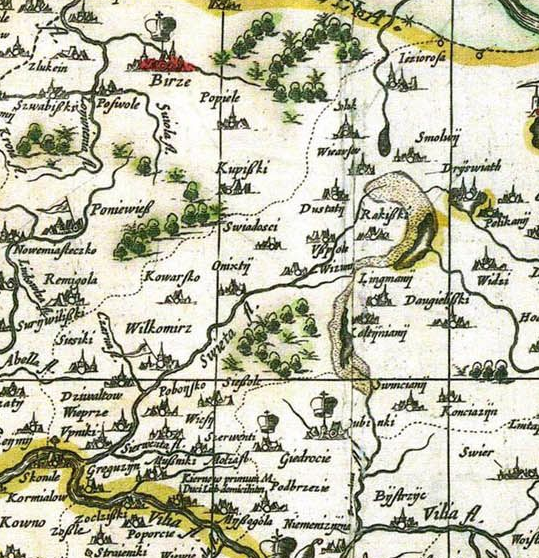
Wilkomirz powiat in Radziwiłł map (1613)

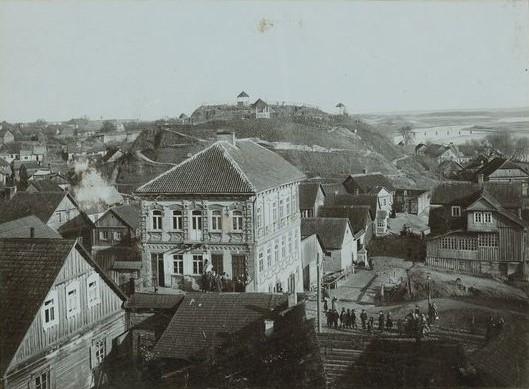
Ukmergė and its hillfort in 1901

Ukmergė was first mentioned in 1225, and named as a settlement in Hermann von Wartberge's chronicle in 1333. It was essentially a wooden fortress that stood on a hill, near the confluence of the Vilkmergė River and the Šventoji River. Ukmergė was attacked by the Teutonic Knights and the Livonian Order in 1333, 1365, 1378, 1386, and even in 1391, already after the Christianization of Lithuania in 1387. During the last attack, Ukmergė was burned to the ground and had to be completely rebuilt.

The region began to adopt Christianity, along with the rest of Lithuania, in 1386. In the following year, 1387, its first Catholic church, St. Peter and St. Paul, was built. It was one of the first Roman Catholic churches established in Lithuania. The town was granted municipal rights at some time after the Battle of Wiłkomierz in 1435, and written sources dating from 1486 referred to it as a city. King Sigismund the Old confirmed these rights. During the times of the Polish–Lithuanian Commonwealth, the city had been the center of powiat in the Vilnius Voivodeship.

In 1655, the Swedish and Russian armies plundered the city. Because of these incessant wars, the growth of Ukmergė suffered many setbacks. Jews began to settle in the city in the late 17th century, and built a synagogue and a cemetery. In the years 1711–1712, the bubonic plague swept through the town and wreaked havoc upon its population. At various times, the 1st Lithuanian National Cavalry Brigade, the 2nd and 3rd Lithuanian Vanguard Regiments and the 1st Lithuanian Infantry Regiment were stationed in the town. In 1792, by the initiative of the city's representative in the Great Sejm, Józef Dominik Kossakowski, King Stanisław August Poniatowski renewed the town's municipal rights and gave it its current coat of arms.

=== 18th and 19th centuries ===
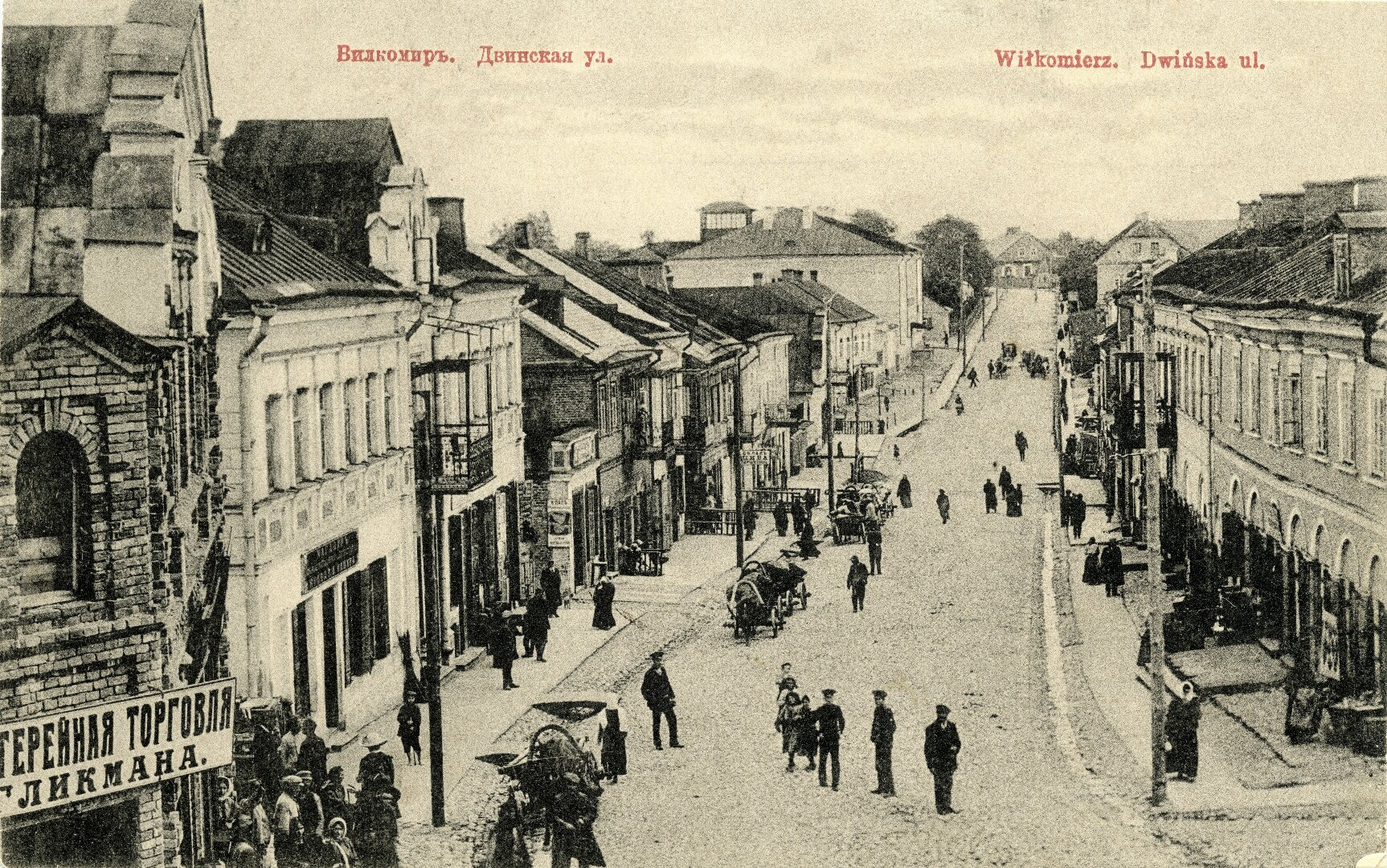
Ukmergė in the late 19th century

During the Third Partition of the Polish–Lithuanian Commonwealth, in 1795, the town was annexed by Russia, becoming a part of the Vilna Governorate. In 1812 the Battle of Deltuva, between the Russian and French armies, occurred not far from Ukmergė; Napoleon's army raided the town during the French invasion of Russia. During the November Uprising in 1831, the city remained in the hands of rebel elements for several months. In 1843, the town became a part of the newly established Kovno Governorate. In 1863, the city participated in the January Uprising against Russia. In 1876 a match factory was established in Ukmergė. In 1877 a fire again ravaged the town. The future president of Lithuania, Antanas Smetona, was born in Užulėnis near Ukmergė, and was educated in the local school. In 1882 a printing-house was opened.

In 1899–1902, thirteen people (including two Lithuanian vicars: Kazimieras Šleivys and Vladislovas Opulskis) were punished for distributing books written in the Lithuanian language in Ukmergė and surroundings villages, which at the time were prohibited by the Russian tsarist authority's imposed Lithuanian press ban. The so-called 'Ukmergė case' has contributed quite a bit to the lifting of the Lithuanian press ban in 1904 and was one of the last cases of its kind.

=== 20th century ===
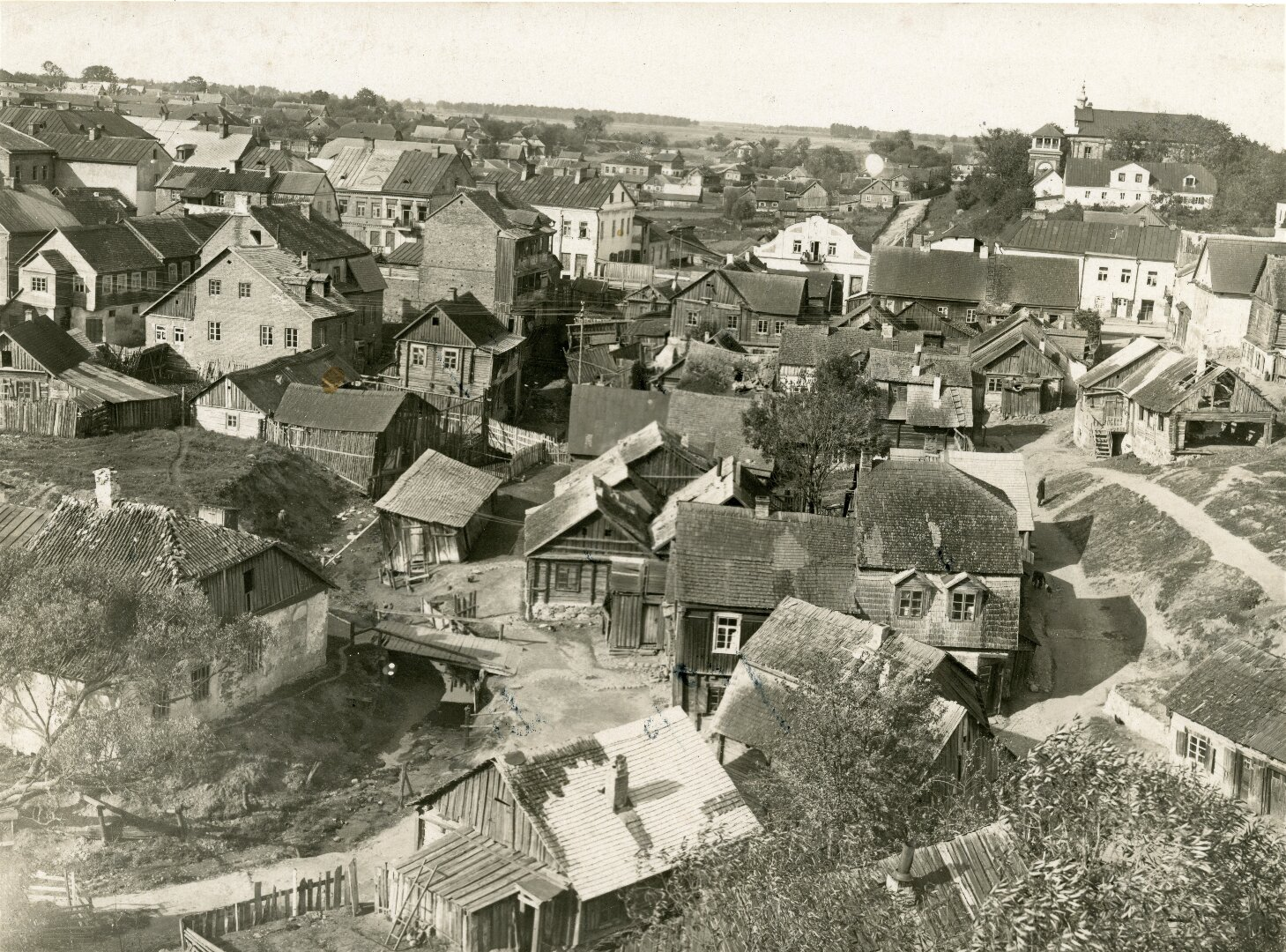
Ukmergė Old Town in 1921

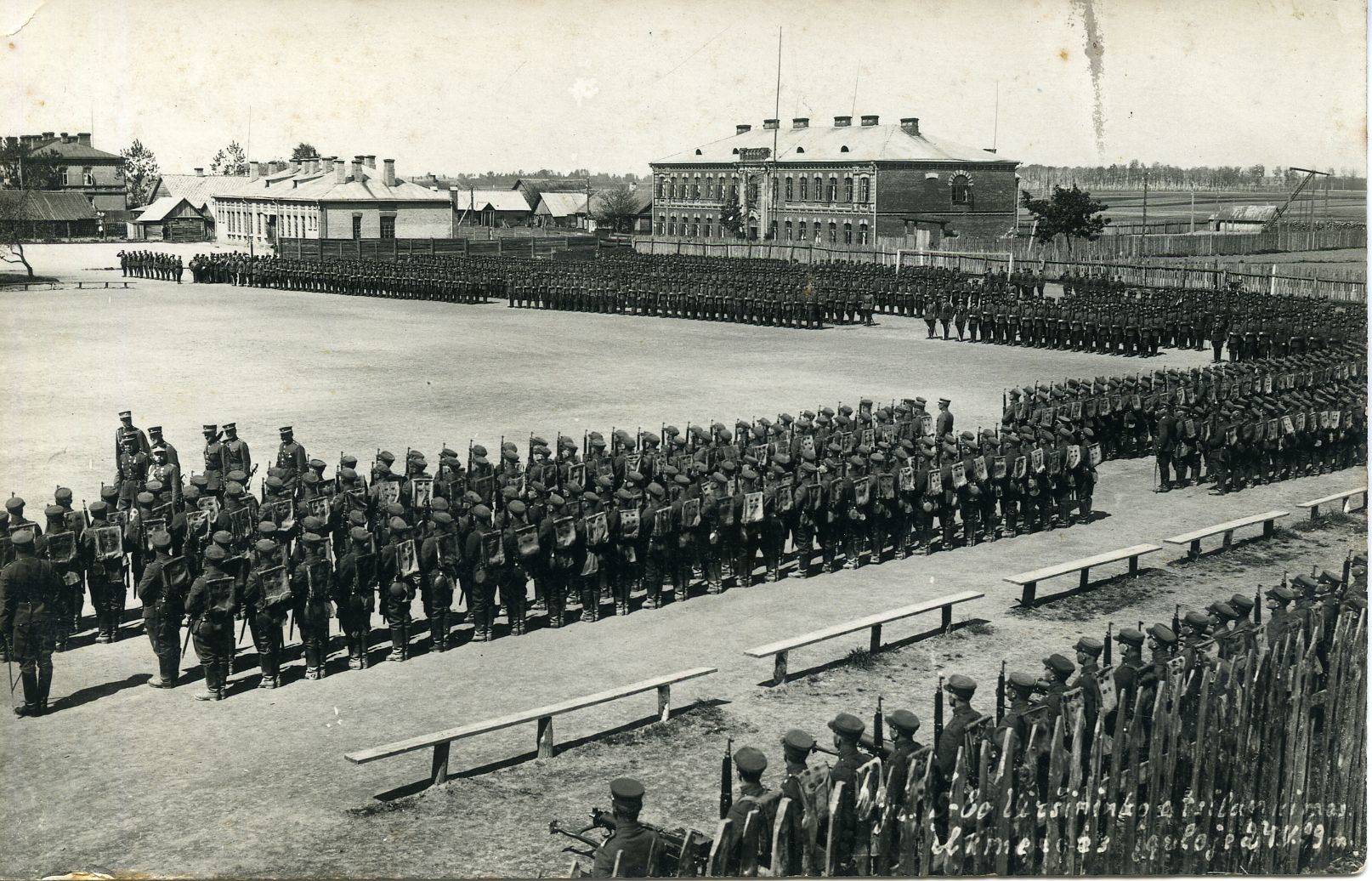
Parade of the Lithuanian Army 1st Infantry Regiment in Ukmergė, 1929

In 1918, after Lithuania declared its independence, the city's name was changed from Vilkmergė to Ukmergė. In 1919 Bolshevik forces occupied the city during the Lithuanian–Soviet War, but it was soon liberated by the Lithuanian army led by Jonas Variakojis. Over five hundred Bolshevik prisoners were taken during the Battle of Ukmergė. An iron foundry was established in the same year. In 1920, the Lithuanian army stopped Polish incursions into the rest of the country, after a series of battles that were waged to establish borders between the two newly re-established countries. An electric plant, a printing house and 120 other small businesses were opened. The city had five newspapers until 1939. In 1930, a monument named Lituania Restituta was erected to commemorate the first decade of restored Lithuanian independence. A Polish high school also operated in Ukmergė during the interbellum.

In 1940, after the Soviet occupation of Lithuania, deportations of people from the town began. When the Germans attacked the Soviet Union and its occupied territories, on June 22, 1941, the retreating Soviets gave instructions to their operatives to kill some 120 prisoners; however, most of them escaped; only eight of them were tortured to death. After the German invasion, the Nazis rounded up and killed about 10,000 members of the town's Jewish population with the help of Lithuanian collaborators. During World War II, the city center suffered from extensive bomb damage.

For years after the return of the Soviets, the city's people organized and participated in resistance movements. The deportation of the city's population to Siberia continued. In 1950 the monument to Lithuania's Independence was destroyed. The city reconstructed it in 1990, even before the restoration of Lithuania's independence was declared. Around 1964, two coupled Soviet R-12 Dvina (SS-4) nuclear missile bases were built in the woods near Ukmergė under Nikita Khrushchev. Each had four surface launch pads, semi-underground hangars to store the missiles and several accessory buildings. The bases were mentioned in the 1987 Intermediate-Range Nuclear Forces Treaty between the United States and the Soviet Union. They both are in a ruined state at present, and freely accessible to the public.

== Climate ==
Climate data for Ukmergė (1991–2020 normals)
Month	Jan	Feb	Mar	Apr	May	Jun	Jul	Aug	Sep	Oct	Nov	Dec	Year
Mean daily maximum °C (°F)	−0.9 (30.4)	0.0 (32.0)	4.9 (40.8)	12.9 (55.2)	18.8 (65.8)	21.9 (71.4)	24.2 (75.6)	23.4 (74.1)	17.9 (64.2)	10.8 (51.4)	4.7 (40.5)	0.6 (33.1)	11.6 (52.9)
Daily mean °C (°F)	−3.2 (26.2)	−2.9 (26.8)	0.9 (33.6)	7.5 (45.5)	12.9 (55.2)	16.3 (61.3)	18.6 (65.5)	17.7 (63.9)	12.8 (55.0)	7.2 (45.0)	2.5 (36.5)	−1.4 (29.5)	7.4 (45.3)
Mean daily minimum °C (°F)	−5.8 (21.6)	−5.7 (21.7)	−2.6 (27.3)	2.3 (36.1)	6.9 (44.4)	11.0 (51.8)	13.0 (55.4)	12.2 (54.0)	8.3 (46.9)	4.1 (39.4)	0.5 (32.9)	−3.6 (25.5)	3.4 (38.1)
Average precipitation mm (inches)	46 (1.8)	38 (1.5)	37 (1.5)	40 (1.6)	60 (2.4)	63 (2.5)	80 (3.1)	80 (3.1)	53 (2.1)	60 (2.4)	50 (2.0)	49 (1.9)	656 (25.8)
Average relative humidity (%)	85	83	76	68	67	71	73	74	78	83	87	87	78
Source: Lithuanian Hydrometeorological Service

== Demography ==
Main bus station

=== Population ===
According to the 2021 census, the city population was 21,258 people:

- Lithuanians – 93.45% (19,865)
- Russians – 3.72% (791)
- Poles – 0.63% (134)
- Ukrainians – 0.35% (76)
- Belarusians – 0.30% (63)
- Others / did not specify – 1.56% (332)

== Notable people ==
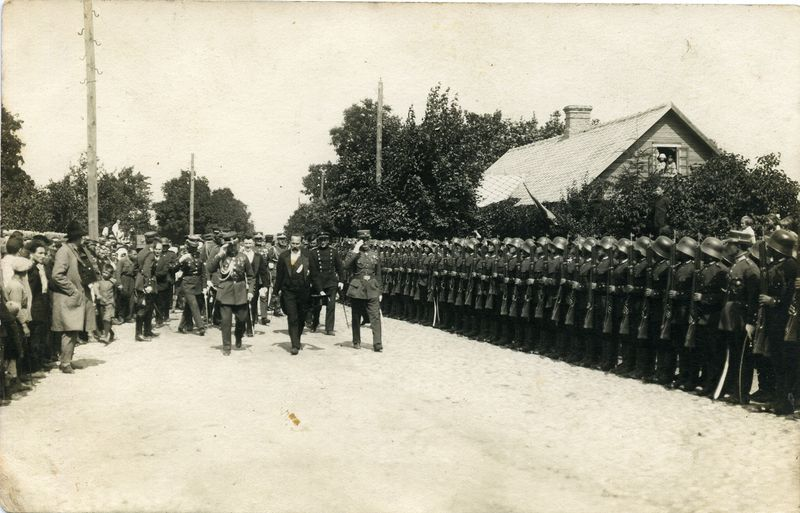
President Antanas Smetona during his visit to Ukmergė in 1933

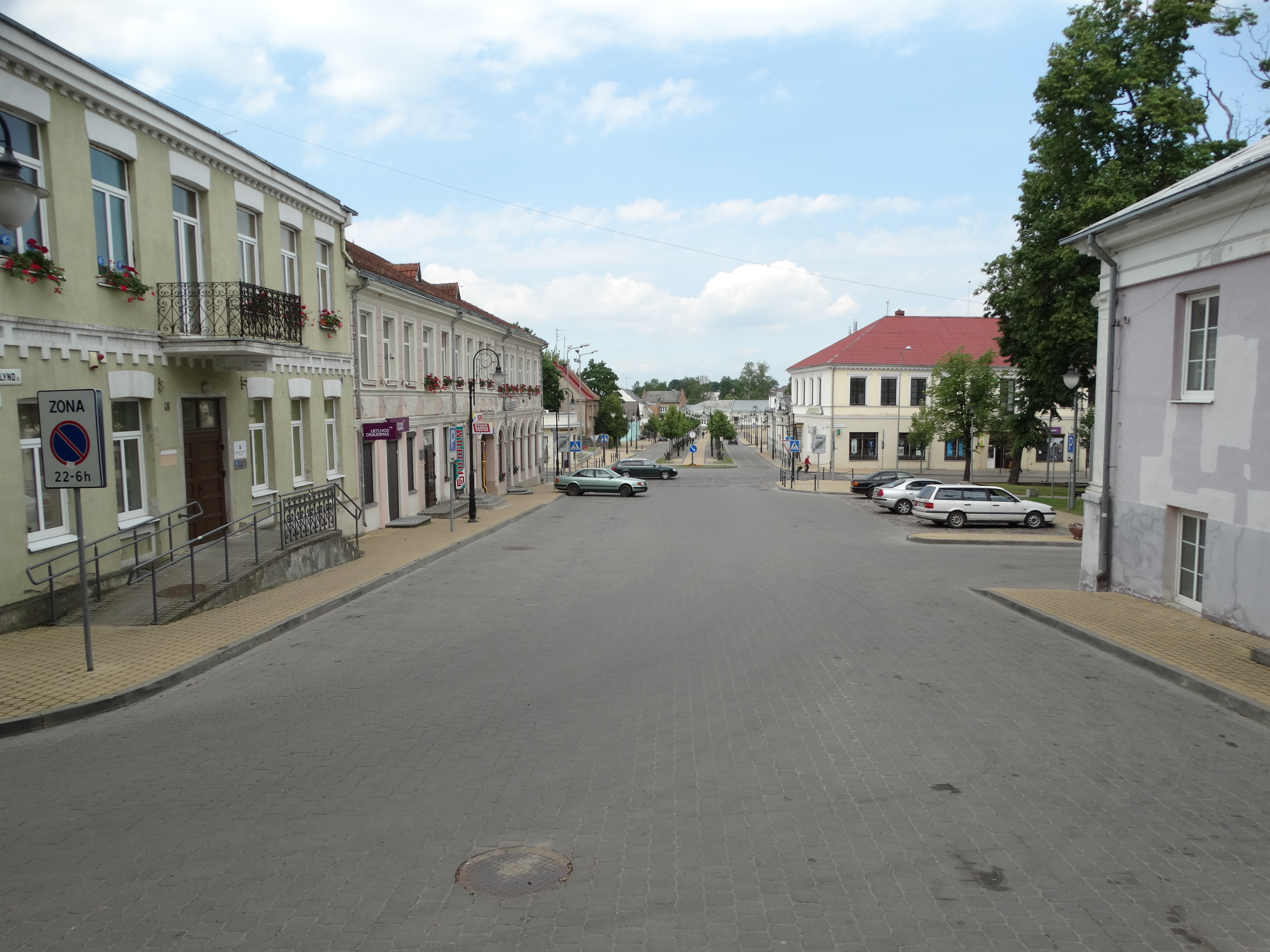
Ukmergė Old Town in 2014

- Bruno Abakanowicz, Polish mathematician, born in 1852, Vilkomir (Ukmergė)
- Rivka Basman Ben-Hayim, Yiddish poet and educator in Israel
- Alexander Braudo, author and publisher, born in 1864, Vilkomir (Ukmergė)
- Leib Gurwicz, rabbi and Talmudic scholar, studied at the yeshivah school here
- Yosef Shlomo Kahaneman, rabbi and Lithuanian parliamentarian, built yeshivas, a school and an orphanage in Ukmergė
- Moshe Leib Lilienblum, scholar and author
- Ben Shahn, American artist, muralist, social activist, photographer and teacher, lived in Ukmerge in the early 1900s
- Antanas Smetona, president of Lithuania 1919–1920 and 1926–1940, was born nearby and educated in the local school system
- Bob Sredersas, Lithuanian-Australian art collector went to school here
- Vida Vencienė, Olympic cross country skiing gold medalist
- Woolf Wess, also known as William Wess or William West, a Jewish anarchist, trade union organizer, and editor of the London-based Yiddish-language anarchist newspaper, Arbeyter Fraynd (Worker's Friend), born in Ukmergė in 1861 and emigrated to London, England, dying there in 1946
- Stanisław Lech Woronowicz, Polish mathematician, born in 1941, Ukmergė
- Zigmas Zinkevičius, Lithuanian linguist, acquired his early schooling in Ukmergė

== Tourism ==
There are many tourist sites in Ukmergė. One of them is a small stone puppy statue named Dog Keksas, to be found in Vienuolyno g. 17 (Ukmerge 20114).

== Twin towns – sister cities ==
Ukmergė is twinned with:

- Bad Langensalza, Germany
- Cologno al Serio, Italy
- Kamianets-Podilskyi, Ukraine
- Kiskunmajsa, Hungary
- Herrljunga, Sweden
- Līvāni, Latvia
- Mariestad, Sweden
- Põlva, Estonia
- Tarnowo Podgórne, Poland
- (Georgia (country)) Tsalenjikha, Georgia
- Unstrut-Hainich-Kreis, Germany
- Västra Götaland County, Sweden
- Wetteraukreis, Germany
- Worcester, England, United Kingdom
- Esztergom, Hungary
- Kiskunlacháza, Hungary

== Gallery ==
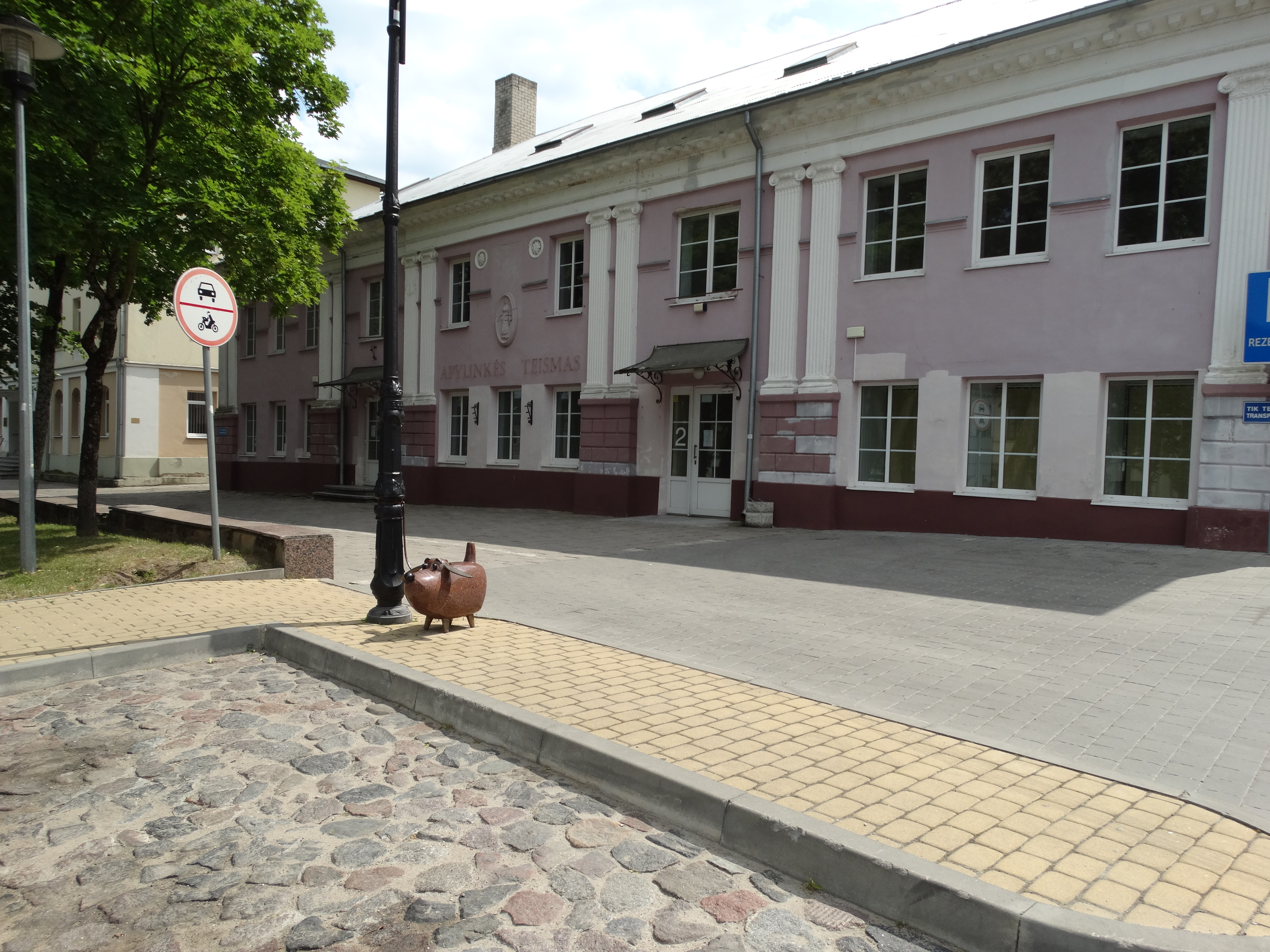
Old Court

Library

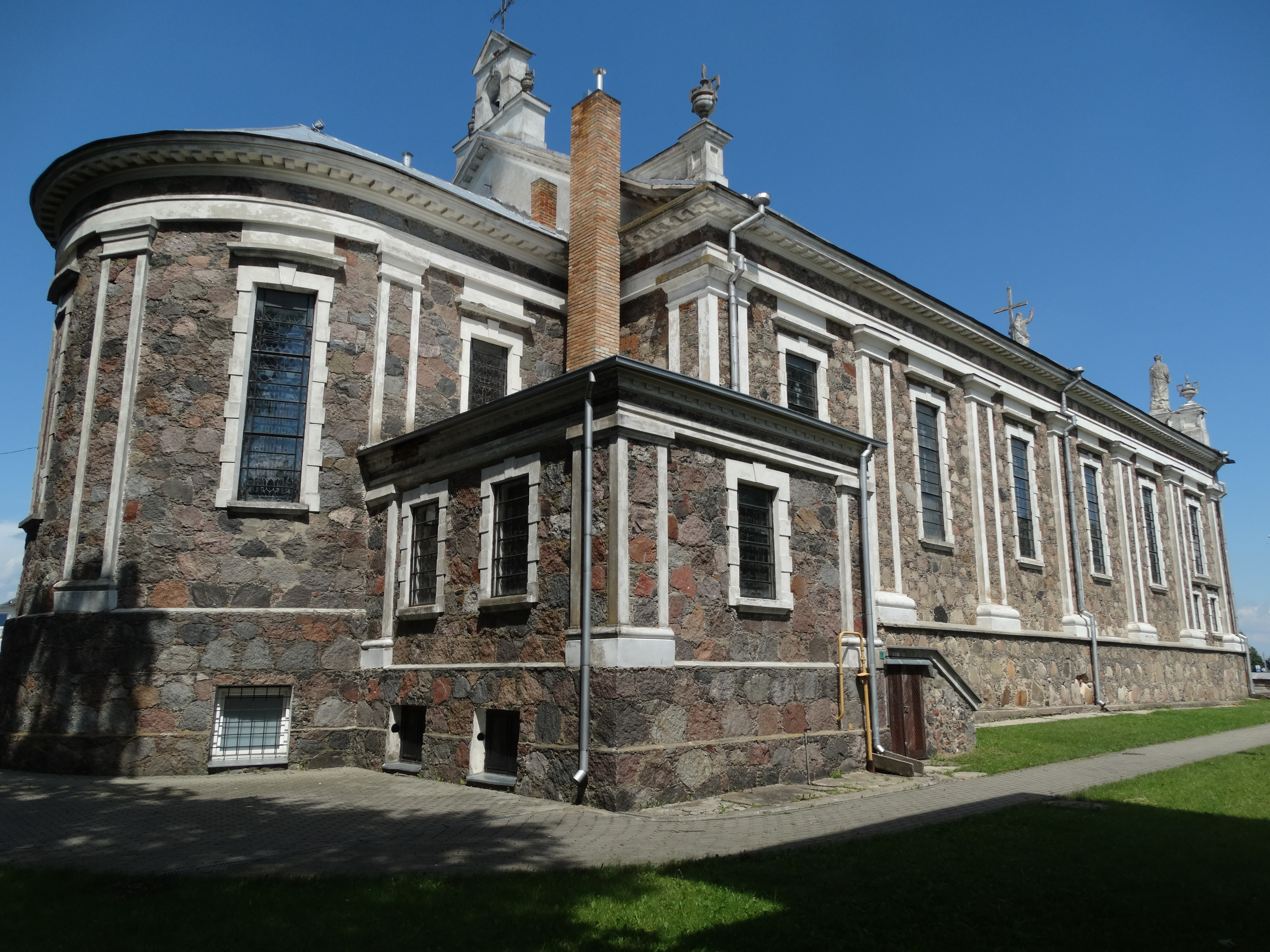
Church of St. Peter and St. Paul

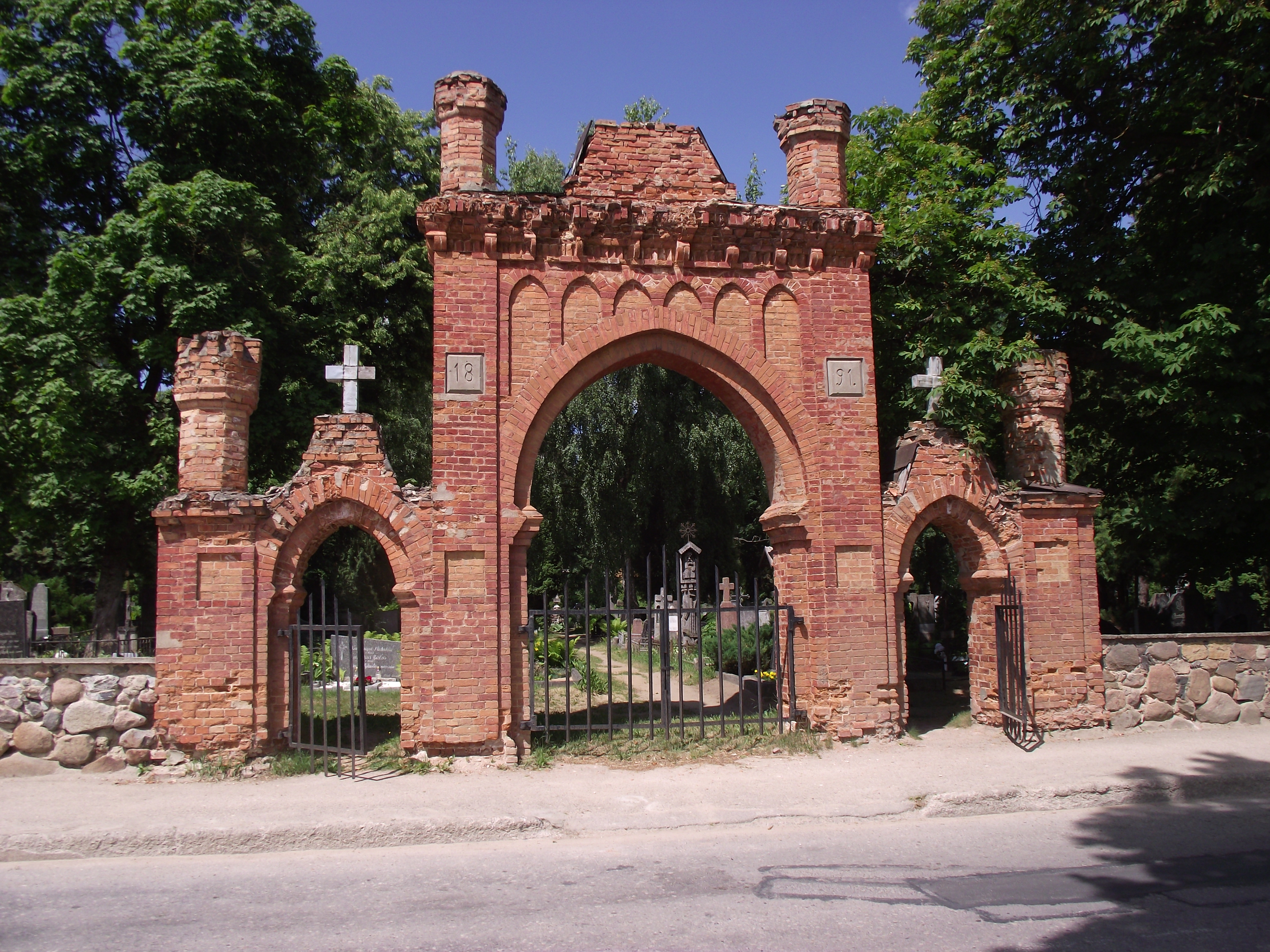
Entrance to the cemetery of Pašilė

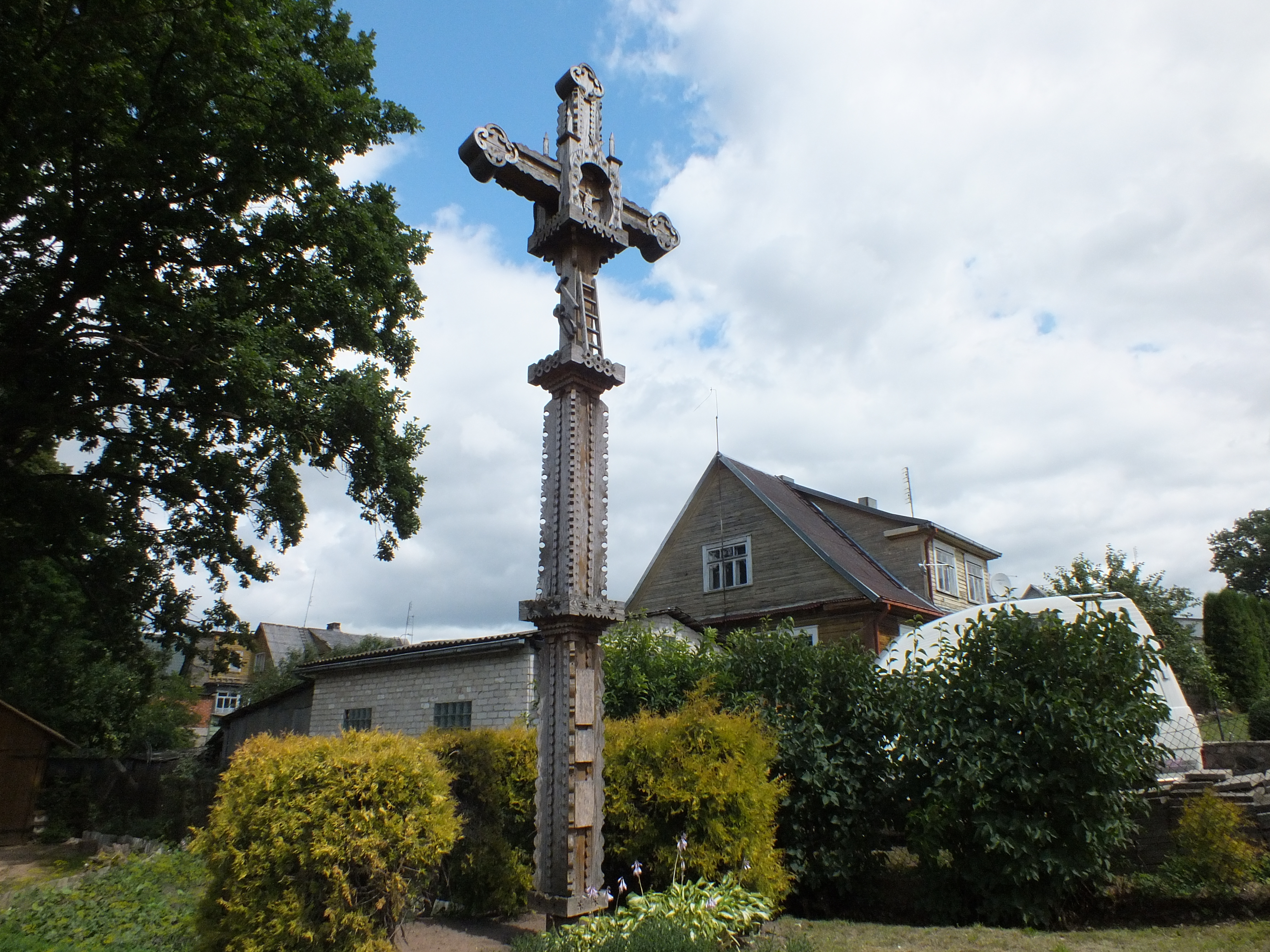
Monument for the Lithuanian partisans who died in 1948

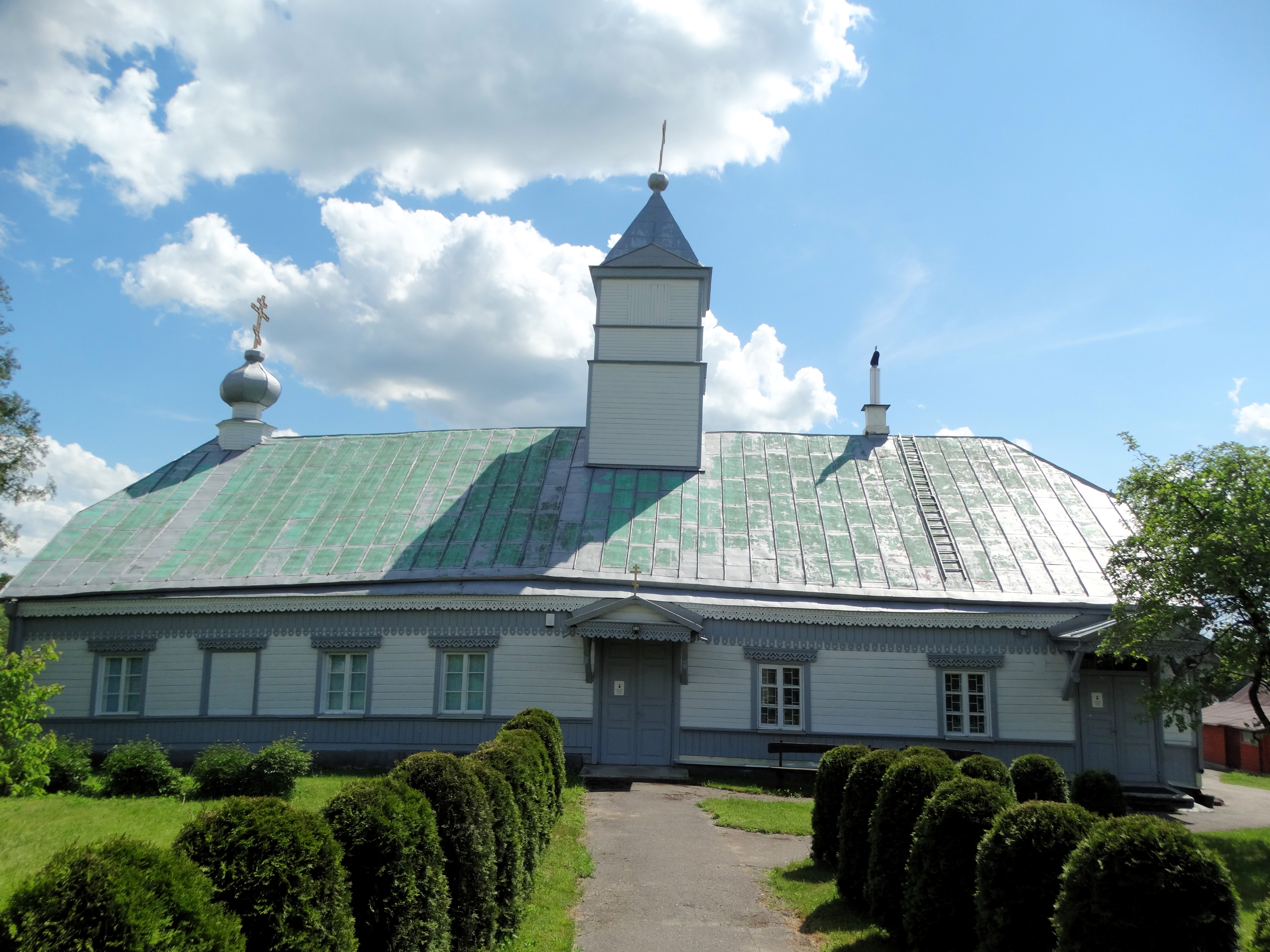
Church of the Old Believers

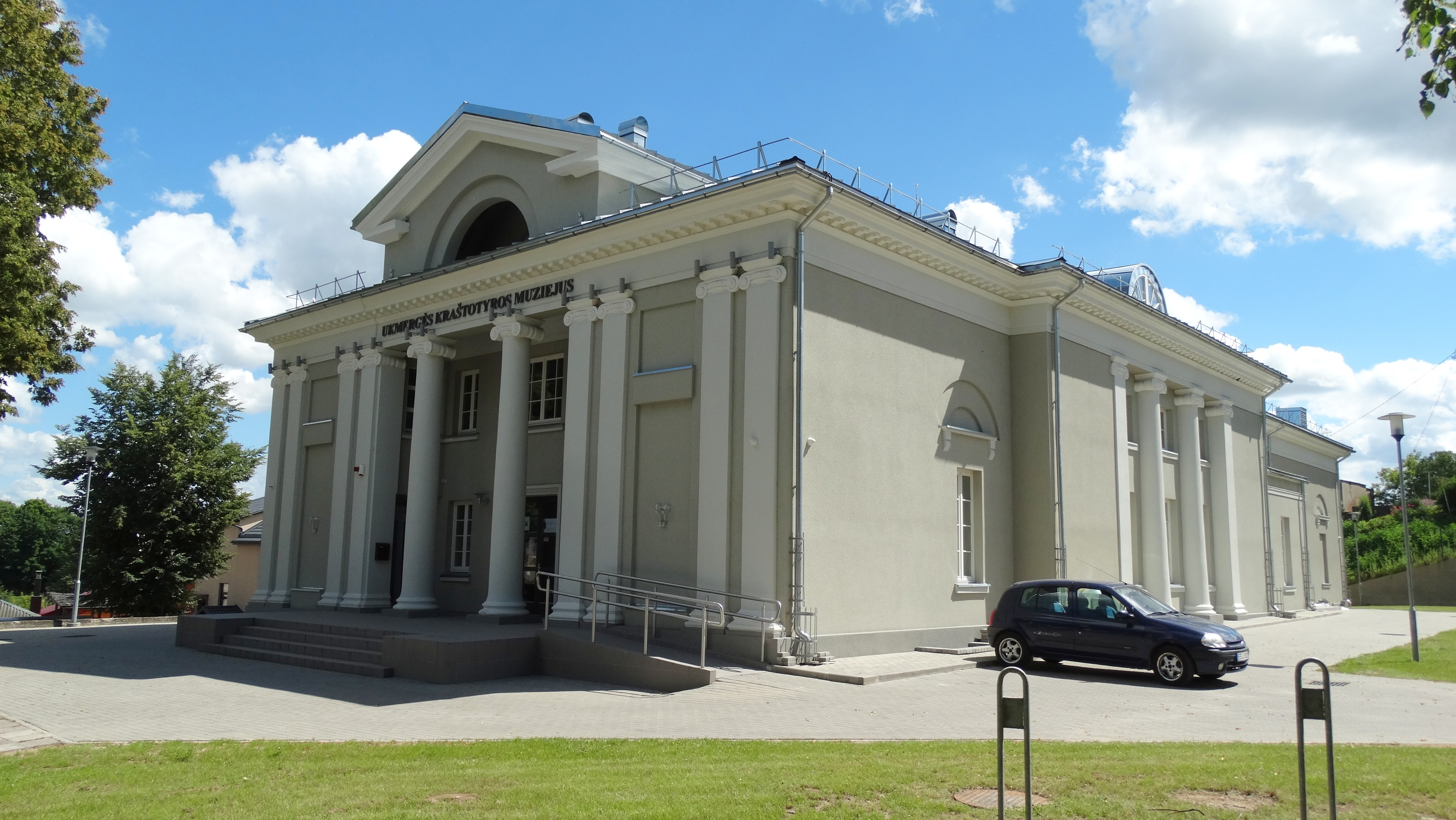
Museum of Local History
