= 2nd Lithuanian Vanguard Regiment =

- Active: 1776-1795
- Country: Grand Duchy of Lithuania
- Type: Cavalry
- Garrison/HQ: Barysaw & Mazyr (1789), Marijampolė (1790), Ukmergė, Anykščiai (1792 October)
- Engagements: Kościuszko Uprising: Battle of Praga

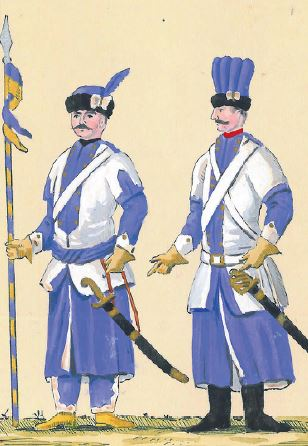

The 2nd Lithuanian Vanguard Regiment (Polish: 2 Pułk Litewski Przedniej Straży) was a military unit of the Grand Duchy of Lithuania. The full name was 2nd Advance Guard Regiment Grand Hetman of Lithuania Josef Jelenski.

== History ==
=== Origins ===
Formed in 1776 from light cavalry.

=== Great Sejm 1788-1792 ===
The regiment was stationed in Barysaw & Mazyr (1789), Marijampolė (1790), Ukmergė, Anykščiai (1792 October).

=== Kościuszko Uprising ===
The regiment fought in the battle of Praga.

== Uniforms ==
=== 1776-1789 ===
The officers had red konfederatka with white cockade and plume, in addition to silver epaulettes. The towarzyszy had red belts. The ordinary soldier had no shoulder straps in contrast to all other ranks.
