= Henri Tebbitt =

English painter

Henri Tebbitt (1852–1926) was an English-Australian painter.

Tebbit was born to English parents in Paris in 1852. Henri's lifespan could never be considered as being droll! He experienced many things in his journey through life. From manning street barricades in Paris against the Germans in the Franco-Prussian War (1870-1871) at the ripe old age of 16, to dining with Charles Dickens while at the Queen Elizabeth Grammar School in Kent. He married Martha Bateman in Scarborough in September 1877. They had a daughter Daisy Marguerite, born in Paris, France, in 1878. However, Henri immigrated to Australia without the family, and went on to marry Robertha McGuigan in Sydney in 1903.

In the early 1900s Henri was invited by the publishers, Angus and Robertson to write his memoirs. This he carried out, but the manuscript was not published by A&R, at the time. However, it has now been published in 2025 by Austin and Macauley of London.

He died in Rose Bay, Sydney, on 4 January 1926. He said of his work: "I have simply endeavoured, perhaps with a vision obscured, to reproduce as faithfully as I could, nature as I see it, and if my efforts are indifferent, no one regrets it more than I do."

The original memoir now resides in the Mitchell Library in Sydney Australia. However, the published work (ISBN 978-1-0358-7154-4) is available.

As an aside, Henri was insistent that his name was to be pronounced "Hen-Rye".
