= Demirci yayla =

Massif and nature reserve in Crimea

- Демерджі-яйла (Ukrainian)
- IUCN category IV (habitat/species management area)
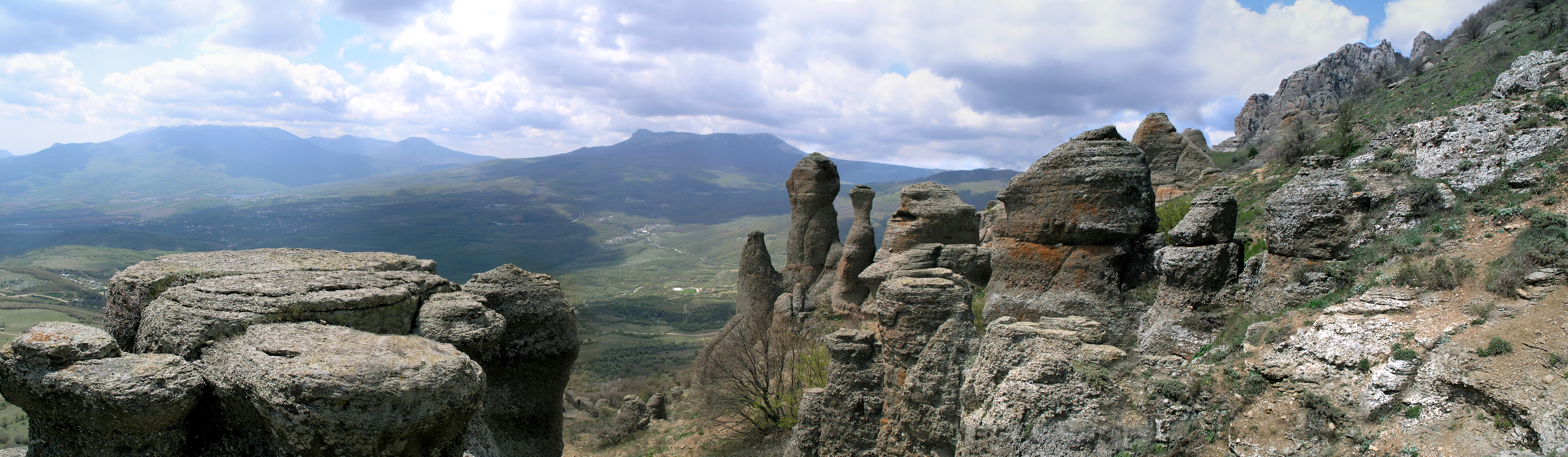
- View from Demirci yayla to Chatyr-Dag, the Valley of Ghosts, and Babugan yayla

- Location within Crimea Location within Ukraine
- Nearest city: Alushta
- Coordinates: 44°45′00″N 34°24′23″E
- Area: 2,076 ha (20.76 km^{2})
- Established: 30 March 1981

Demirci yayla (Crimean Tatar: Demirci yaylası; Ukrainian: Демерджі-яйла; Russian: Демерджи-яйла, romanized: Demerdzhi-yayla) is a massif and regional nature reserve (zakaznik) located in Crimea, a region internationally recognised as part of Ukraine but under Russian control since 2014. The yayla is best known for the Valley of Ghosts, a rock-filled valley situated in the massif.

== Description ==
Situated in the Central Range of the Crimean Mountains, Demirci yayla is made up of two parts: North Demirci and South Demirci. The height of the former stretches up to 1,239 m (4,065 ft), and the latter 1,356 m (4,449 ft). The yayla is composed of components dating back to the Late Jurassic period. There are a total of 16 caves in Demirci yayla, many of which are named after Russian and Soviet biologists such as Georgy Fedorovich Morozov, Evgenii Wulff, and Georgy Vysotsky. The area is home to more than 420 varieties of flora, as well as Quercus pubescens, Lithocarpus, Carpinus betulus, Fagus sylvatica, and Pinus nigra.

Demirci yayla's most significant natural landmarks are the Kuchuk-Lambat stone chaos and the Valley of Ghosts. The Funa Fortress is located at the foot of Southern Demirci.

At the top of the mountain, a rare atmospheric phenomenon known as the Brocken spectre can be seen during sunrise. To observe the "ghost" appearance, several conditions must be met: Chatyr-Dag must be shrouded in mist and the area over the sea and Demirci yayla must be clear, transparent and completely permeable to sunlight. During sunrise, it is possible to see shadows projected on the background of Chatyr-Dag, shrouded in mist, surrounded by a circular rainbow halo.

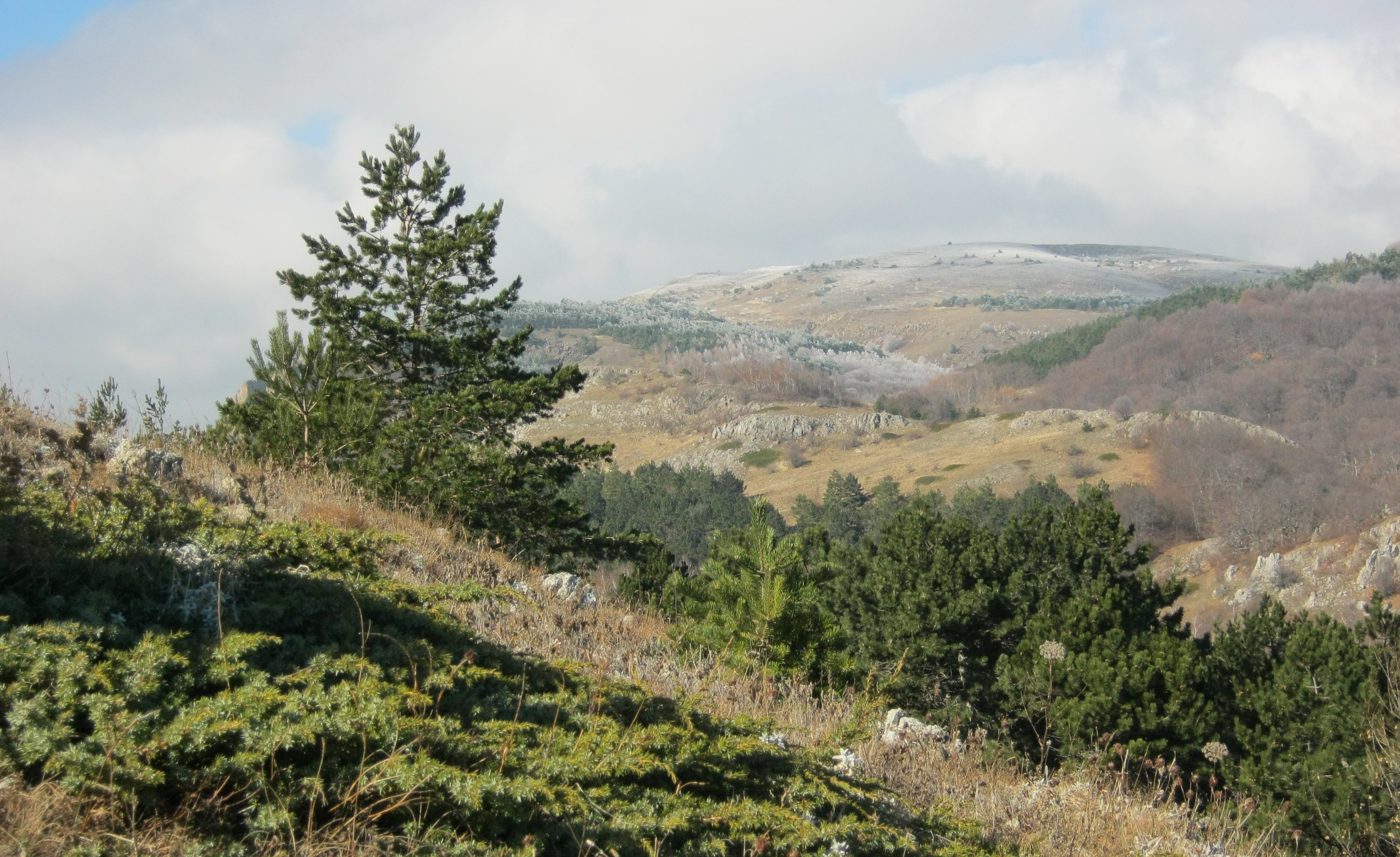
View of Northern Demerdzhi from the south

The word demirci translates literally from Crimean Tatar as "blacksmith". According to Crimean Tatar folklore, a blacksmith on living the mountain captured a young woman, who fell to her death while trying to escape. As a result of the woman's death, the mountain's deity, in anger, caused boulders to rain on the area, killing the blacksmith and destroying the nearby village.

In 1894, a rockslide occurred at Demirci yayla, causing the destruction of four houses within a village. Following the events, the local population subsequently evacuated and re-established themselves elsewhere, under the name of Demirci (now known as Luchyste).

== Nature reserve ==
On 30 March 1981, Demirci yayla was declared a zakaznik of national importance by the government of the Ukrainian Soviet Socialist Republic. This designation has continued to the modern day under both the Ukrainian government and Russian occupation authorities. The reserve includes an area of 2,076 ha (20.76 km^{2}), and is separated into four territories; North Demirci, South Demirci, the Valley of Ghosts, and the Dhzurla waterfall.
