= Valley of Ghosts (Crimea) =

Area of naturally-occurring stone figures in Crimea

- Location within Crimea
- Width: 1,100 m (3,600 ft)
- Area: 4 million m³

Geology
- Age: 800 million - 1.1 billion years

Geography
- Location: Alushta Municipality, Crimea
- Population centers: Alushta, Luchyste
- Coordinates: 44°40′39″N 34°25′04″E
- Interactive map of Valley of Ghosts

The Valley of Ghosts (Russian: Долина привидений; Ukrainian: Долина привидів is a valley located in Crimea made up of naturally shaped rocks on the Southern Demirci mountain, located near Alushta city.

The stone shapes resemble statues of humans, animals, legendary creatures from fairy tales, pyramids and various mystery objects. The characteristics and forms of the rocks are also subject to the time of day, lighting and atmospheric conditions, such as the characteristic thick fog of the region. It is a unique and natural monument of national significance.

Demirci yayla is the only place in the Crimea to observe the phenomenon of the Brocken spectre.

== History ==
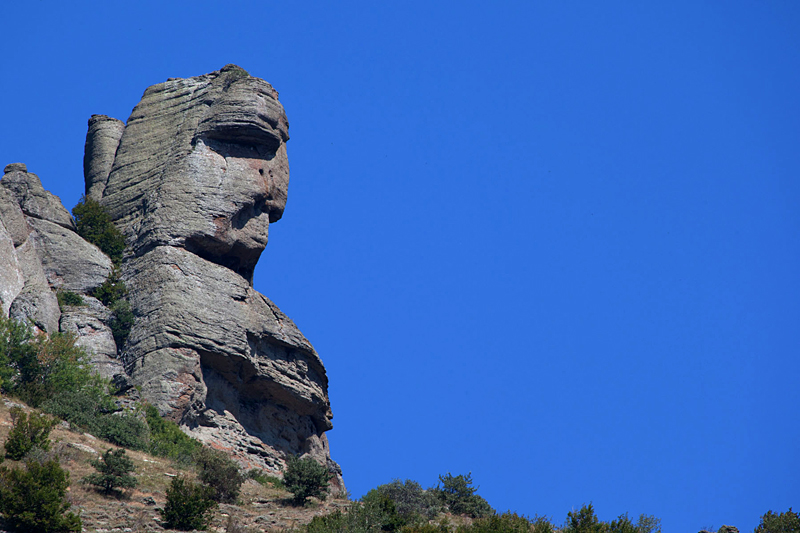
View of the Valley of Ghosts from South Demirci

"Stone figures", which were formed by the weathering of rocks on the southwest slope of Demirci yayla, are called the Valley of Ghosts. It has been affected by several rock falls, notably in April 1894 and August 1966. Demirci yayla gets its mystery from the haze which changes its colors. In the Middle Ages, the mountain had the name 'Funa', which means "fuming", because of frequent fog. The Valley of Ghosts was located on the slopes of Demirci Castle and its remains have survived until now. There is a road which leads to the castle near the Valley of Ghosts . Near the village of Funa, there are the ruins of Funa Fortress, dating back to 13th - 15th centuries. The fortress was an outpost of the Principality of Theodoro, where a small garrison prevented the penetration of the Genoese into Tavria. There was also a towered two-story church where a family vault is located.

Geologists hypothesize that the Valley of Ghosts became unwrinkled due to centuries of influence of the sea. The sea levels rose, and the entire Crimean Peninsula turned into many small islands. Over thousands of years passed, the sea was gradually going down, washing the lowlands of high rocks and hard stones turning into crumbly sand of the sea, gradually grinding boulders and giving them the most intricate shapes.

== Geology ==
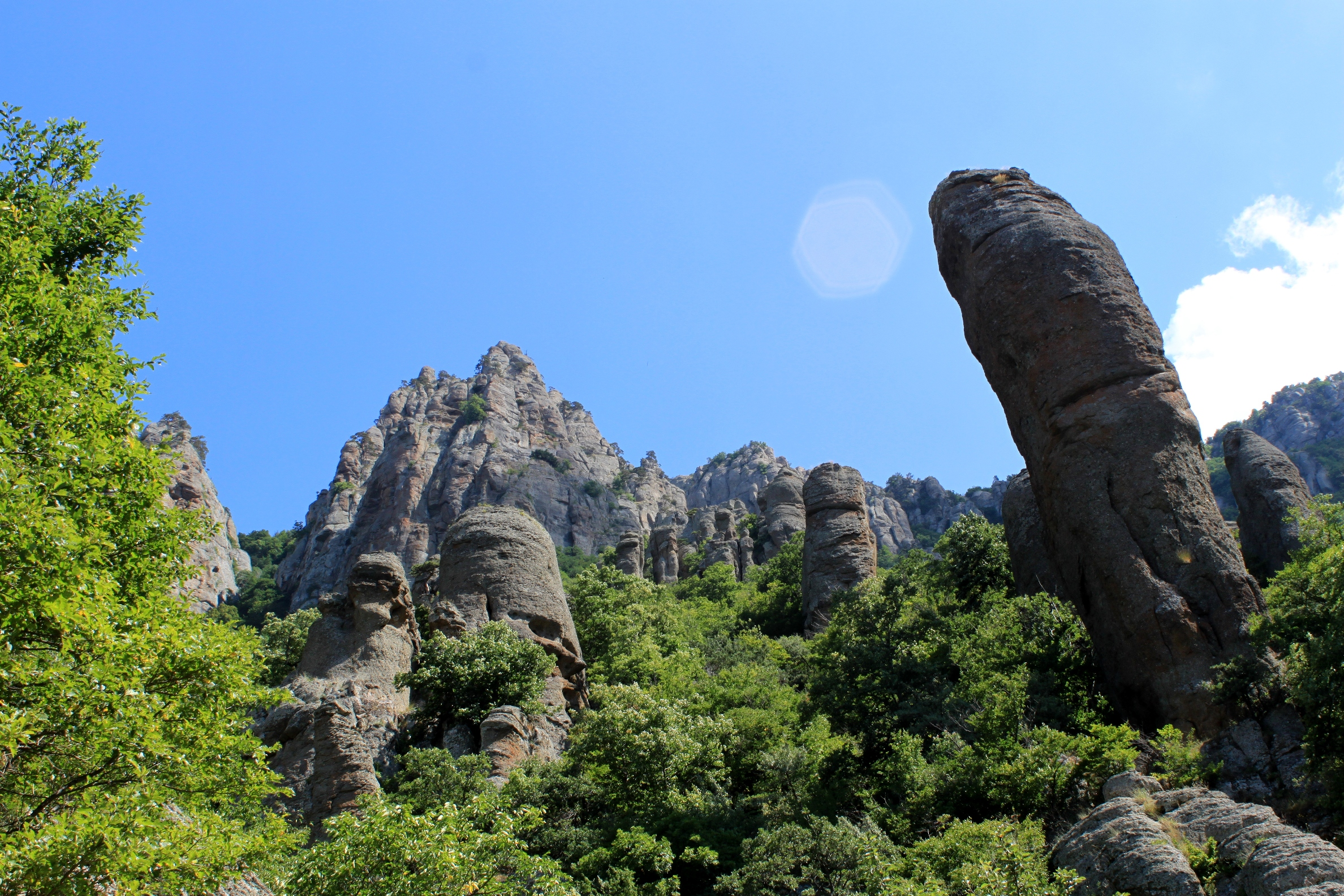
The Valley of Ghosts from the foot of Demirci yayla

The Southern Demirci mountain has developed the so-called conglomerates-small fragments of various rocks, boulders, pebbles of different sizes cemented sand and clay. These were formed in the coastal sea in the Late Jurassic period. The conglomerates exhibit cracks of different types.

These conglomerates are geologically unusual for three reasons. Firstly, the Valley of Rocks conglomerates include quartzite and pink granite, in addition to the typical Crimea sandstone, compacted clay, limestone, milky white quartz and brown siderite concretions. Secondly, the granite, dated to 650 - 950 million years old, is significantly older than the surrounding clay and sandstone of the Crimean mountains, dated to 160 - 200 million years. Thirdly, the Demirci conglomerates are unusually large, with sizes of around 1,750 metres (5,740 ft).

== Climate ==
The Valley of Ghosts has a typical Crimean climate of hot summers and mild winters. The average winter temperature, especially in the coldest month of January, is about −0.8 °C (30.6 °F). In summer, the warmest month is July with a temperature of 20.4 °C (68.7 °F). The variation in annual temperature is around 21.2 °C (38.2 °F). The dry climate means that the water temperature remains stable between 0–8 °C (0–14 °F).

October is the driest month with an average precipitation is 40mm. Precipitation is the greatest in December, with an average is 81mm.

Climate data for Crimea
Month	Jan	Feb	Mar	Apr	May	Jun	Jul	Aug	Sep	Oct	Nov	Dec	Year
Mean daily maximum °C (°F)	2.6 (36.7)	3.1 (37.6)	6.3 (43.3)	13.3 (55.9)	18.6 (65.5)	22.8 (73.0)	25.7 (78.3)	25.2 (77.4)	20.7 (69.3)	14.7 (58.5)	9.3 (48.7)	5.1 (41.2)	14.0 (57.1)
Daily mean °C (°F)	−0.8 (30.6)	−0.3 (31.5)	2.4 (36.3)	8.5 (47.3)	13.7 (56.7)	17.7 (63.9)	20.4 (68.7)	19.9 (67.8)	15.6 (60.1)	10.2 (50.4)	5.7 (42.3)	2.0 (35.6)	9.6 (49.3)
Mean daily minimum °C (°F)	−4.1 (24.6)	−3.7 (25.3)	−1.4 (29.5)	3.8 (38.8)	8.8 (47.8)	12.7 (54.9)	15.1 (59.2)	14.6 (58.3)	10.5 (50.9)	5.8 (42.4)	2.2 (36.0)	−1.1 (30.0)	5.3 (41.5)
Average precipitation mm (inches)	69 (2.7)	54 (2.1)	46 (1.8)	41 (1.6)	49 (1.9)	58 (2.3)	47 (1.9)	47 (1.9)	42 (1.7)	40 (1.6)	56 (2.2)	81 (3.2)	630 (24.8)
Source: http://en.climate-data.org/location/273874/

== Wildlife ==
=== Flora ===
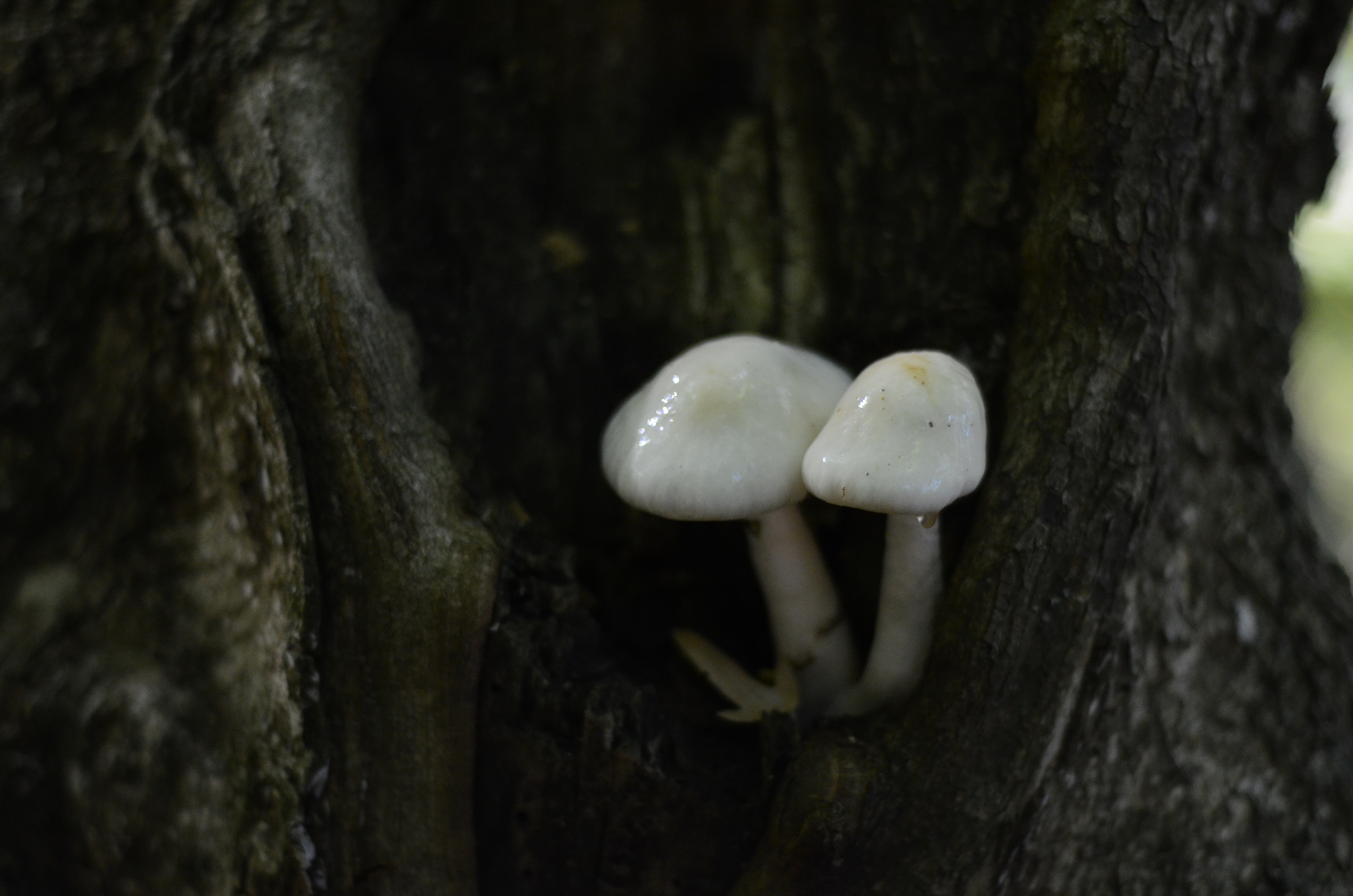
Oudemansiella mucida on Demirci yayla

The valley is symbolised by walnut and cherry trees, lawn, rocks, springs (already partially capped), creeks and small deep lakes. Meadows occur, where fruit trees grow. These are so-called 'chairies', a local name for woodland gardens. These were created by the local population, and are now being replaced by farms with more prolific gardens. There is a relic forest, flora of which includes 420 species, including singular species such as yew, lyadvenets Crimea, sainfoin yaylinsky, pyracantha, and others.

=== Fauna ===
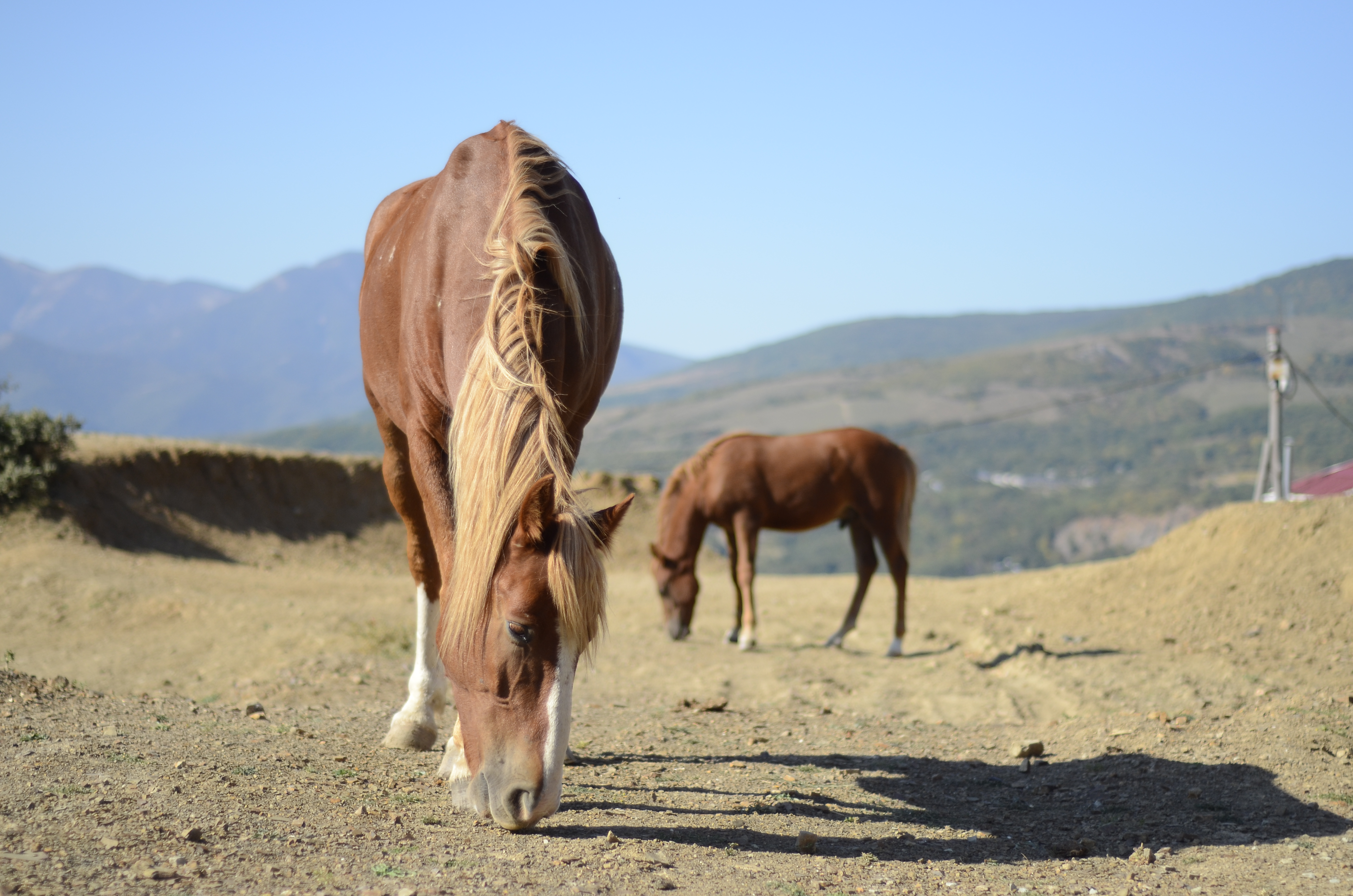
Two horses photographed on the Demirci yayla

Typical fauna comprehends:

- wild pigeons, which feed on the seeds of weeds and fallen fruits
- partridge or chukar, which are safeguarded by law and hunting of them is forbidden
- rock thrush
- northern wheatear
- woodpecker

== Toponymy ==
The name of the old village of Funa ("smoky" in Greek), located under the mountain near a road to Aluston (current Alushta) may have its origins in the occupant's trade in blacksmithing.

At the end of the 18th century, when Christians were forced out of Crimea by the decree of Catherine II, the village became occupied by Crimean Tatars from the southern coast. The village was rechristened "Demirci" ("smith" in the Crimean Tatar language).

Today, the village has the name Luchyste. Russian history books point out that the village was reallocated to a more secure place based on the advice of the geologist Nikolai A. Golovkinsky after the disaster in 1894 (rockfalls occurred regularly since 1615 to 1989). However, authors of the book "Aluston and Funa", K. Kogonashvili and O. Makhneva, pictured this episode in a different way. They wrote that the village was relocated due to a local landlord magnifying the risk so that he could spread and expand their garden at the site of the old village.

== Tourism ==
The Valley of Ghosts can be reached via the village Luchyste, taking the trolleybuses No.51 or No.52 on the Simferopol-Alushta-Yalta road. From Luchyste, it takes 30 minutes walking along paved road to the valley, passing a horse riding club called Zolotaya Podkova ("Golden Horseshoe", Золотая подкова).

The village of Luchyste can be also reached from Alushta by bus No.107 from the town bus station.

If traveling by car from the city of Alushta, Luchyste can be found in 4 km (2.5 mi).

== Movies ==
=== Hearts of Three ===
The Valley of Ghosts is a filming location for some scenes in the film "Hearts of Three" (Russian: Сердца трех, Ukrainian: Серця трьох). This film was based on the novel Hearts of Three. In one scene, company Solano spent the night in the old ruins of the Funa Fortress at Southern Demirci when they were running away from the police. The heroes came across the Indian Maya Rudolph there. Chia's eyes flashed in the middle of the Valley of Ghosts. In the film, it was called "The valley of lost souls".

=== Kidnapping, Caucasian Style ===
The Soviet film Kidnapping, Caucasian Style (Russian: Кавказская пленница) used areas in the Caucasus and in Crimea. The song of N. Varley was performed on one of the rocks belonging to the Valley of Ghosts, which is about two meters tall. Also, here grew "The Nikulin nut", with whom the actor fell during the filming. The tree branch cracked somewhere other than where the initial incision was made, and the actor broke his arm. Therefore, the shooting had to be put off until a later time. The primary filming locations are the city center of Alushta, and The Valley of Ghosts. Additionally, in Kidnapping, Caucasian Style, there are scenes shot in Simferopol (a mental hospital), on the top of Ai-Petri and the Caucasus, and in the Adler Microdistrict of Sochi on the Mzymta River.

== Legends ==
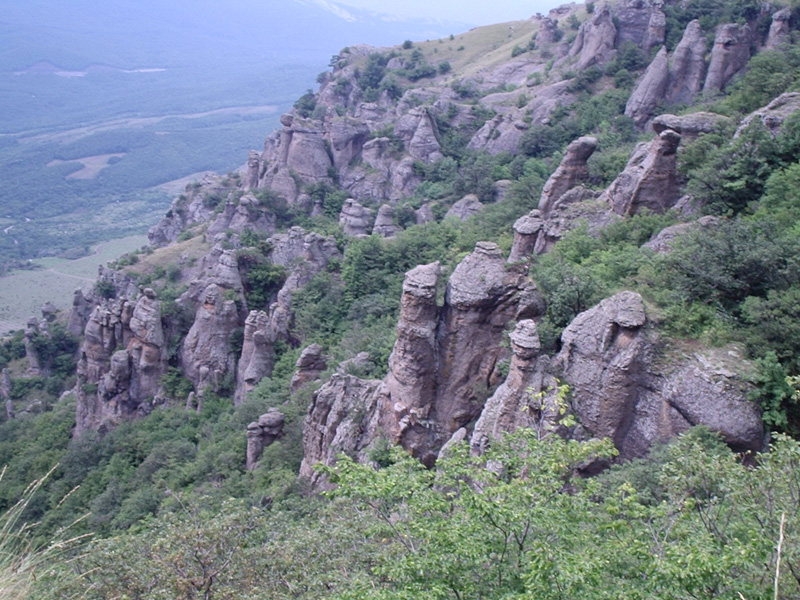
Some rocks which are shaped like ghosts.

The legend of the origin of the Valley of Ghosts has different names, such as: "The Smith from Demirci yayla", "Mountain-smith", "About the Demirci yayla". There are several variations to the story, which however contains the common elements.

=== The blacksmith ===
This legend portrays the story of how Crimean conquerors - nomads - came to the land. The residents named the mountain "Funa" because post-fire steam and lights regularly came out from the top of the mountain. The blacksmith who delegated as the nomad by conquerors set up a huge forge on the mountain which became a workplace to create weapons and start using it to enslave the locals. Strongest men in the village were all taken into the forge.

When people from the village worked to exhaustion and even some died, they went to the blacksmith to ask him to leave the mountain. The blacksmith responded by killing them all by fire. A girl called Maria decided to go to the blacksmith alone again. She quietly snuck into the smithy one night and asked the Blacksmith to leave the mountain. The blacksmith refused and commanded Maria to stay with him. In response, Maria pushed him strongly straight to the furnace. The blacksmith grabbed a dagger and killed the girl. The mountain itself could not tolerate this anymore, so it swallowed blacksmith together with his men (the nomads) and carried people from the valley to their original homes by wind.

When the flames were extinguished and the dust settled, an extraordinary scene was there. Towering stone statues of unknown monsters - they were ugly similarities of a blacksmith and his henchmen - were on the mountain. On the highest point of the mountain, there was a rock, looked like the girl Maria - the latest victim of a brutal blacksmith.

From that time Funa was extinguished, no fire is ever seen over the top. People who knew the story gave the mountain a new name - Demirci, which means "smith".

=== Legend of Demirci yayla ===
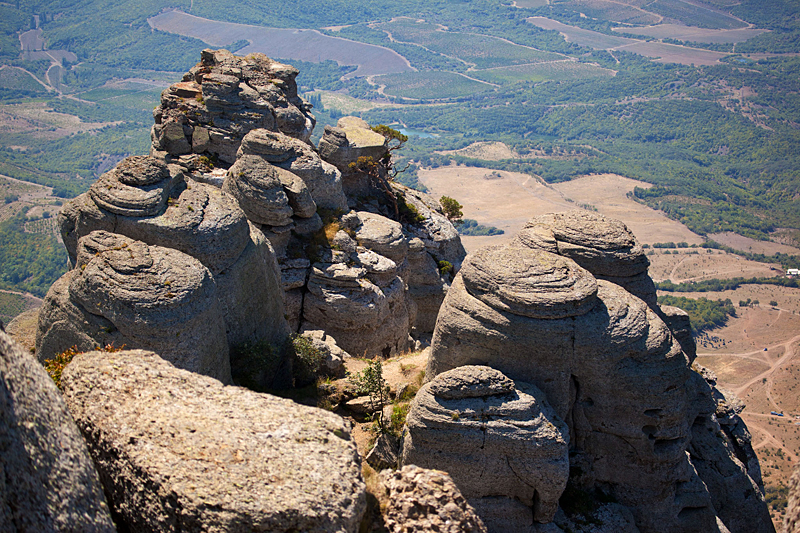
The Valley of Ghosts

Many years ago, an unknown man who knew the devil and named blacksmith settled on the top of Demirci yayla. Once, the mountain shook and houses within the villages were then destroyed. Villagers gathered together to discuss because the mountain was at peace before the strange man came. They decided to send the most courageous and intelligent ones up the mountain, requesting the stranger to leave, but he refused.

After a while, a beautiful Greek woman came to the mountain and sat down to rest near a spring. In the village, where she was from, the fountains stopped murmuring, and people lost their water. People then realized who was the cult of the disaster and went to demand the return of beauty.

The news was spread that the stranger was the great sinner. People believed that the mountain trembled because it does not want to carry him anymore. Terrified inhabitants of the valley gathered in the ancient temple and begged God to save them from the evil alien but nothings happened for long days. When the holidays horban-Adha come, believers prayed for three days and nights. The flame was raised on Demirci yayla, buzzes and groanings were all around, great stones fell down from the mountain. As everything came to peace, people did not see the terrible alien anymore.

But strangely, they found stone figures of animals, form of people and unseen monsters on the mountainside facing the Babugan yayla. Later, people learned that this was done to make sure that people should never forget the terrible sinner who was responsible of that tragedy.

== See also ==
Similar places in the world

- Bryce Canyon National Park - UT, USA
- Devils Tower - WY, USA
- Joshua Tree National Park - CA, USA
- Tsingy de Bemaraha Strict Nature Reserve - Madagascar

Similar places in Crimea

- Chufut Kale
- Kara Dag Mountain
- Mangup

Places around

- Alushta
- Chatyr-Dag
- Dhzurla
- Djur-Djur

== Gallery ==
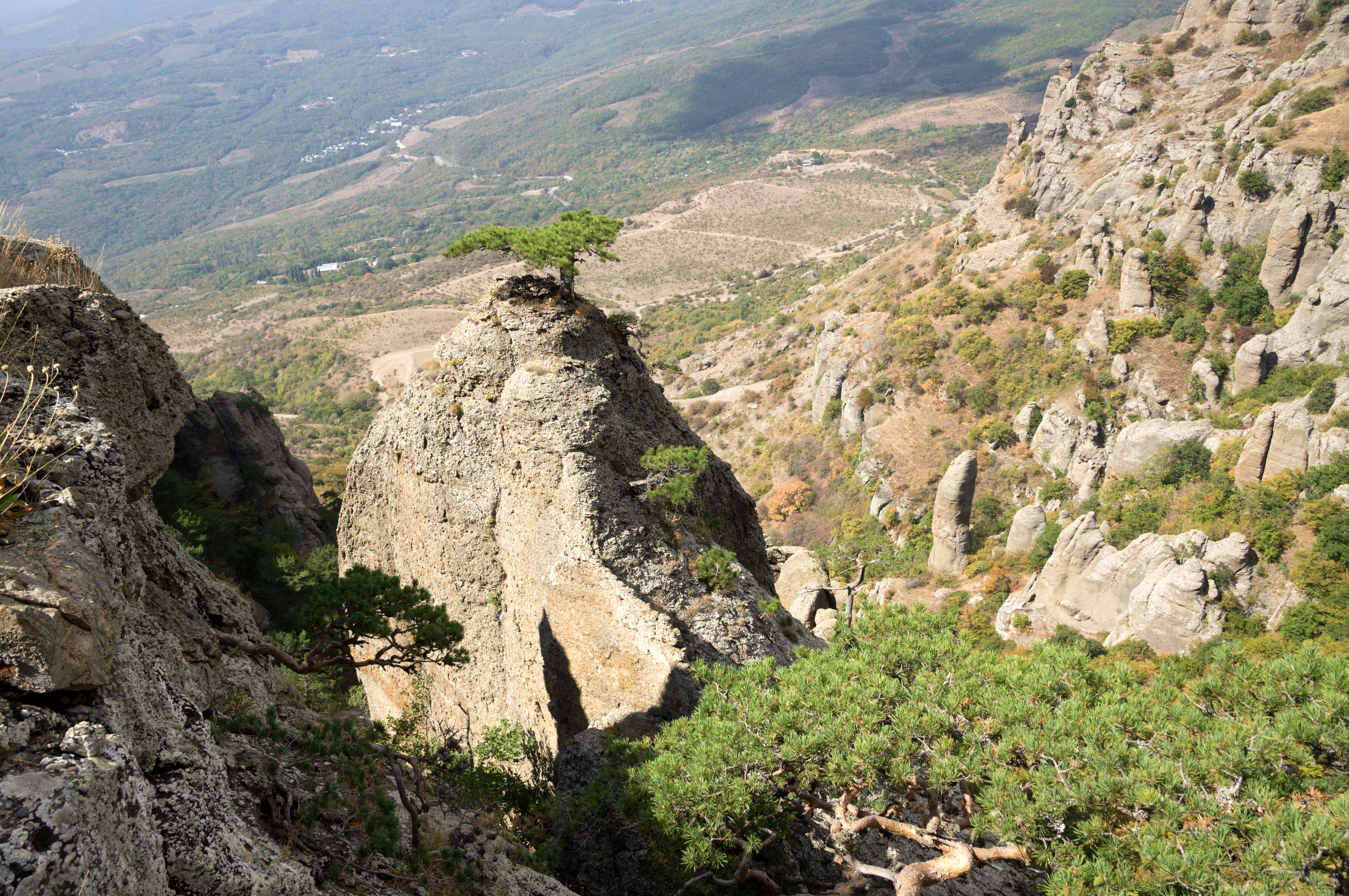
Boulders

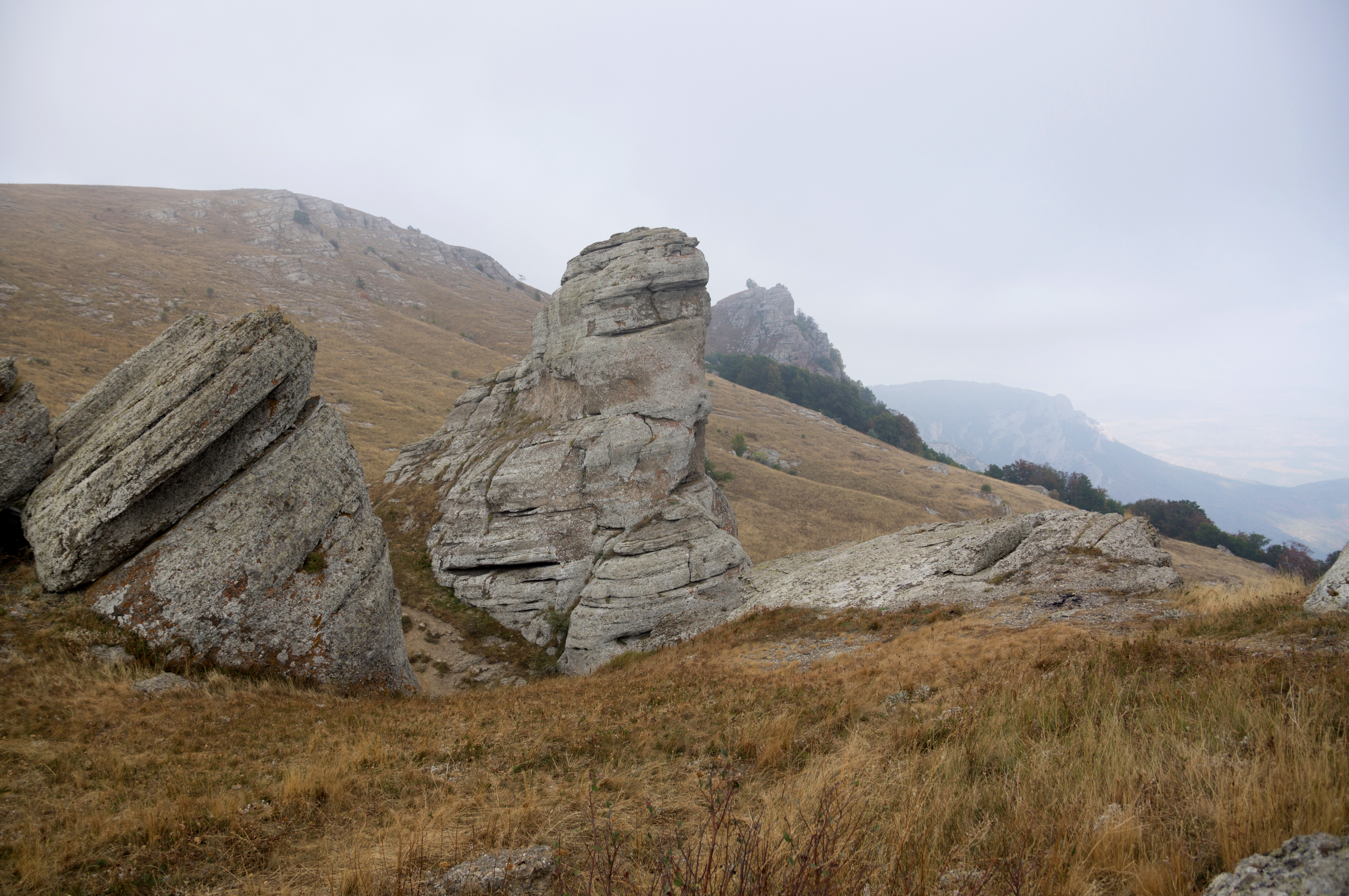
Southern Demirci

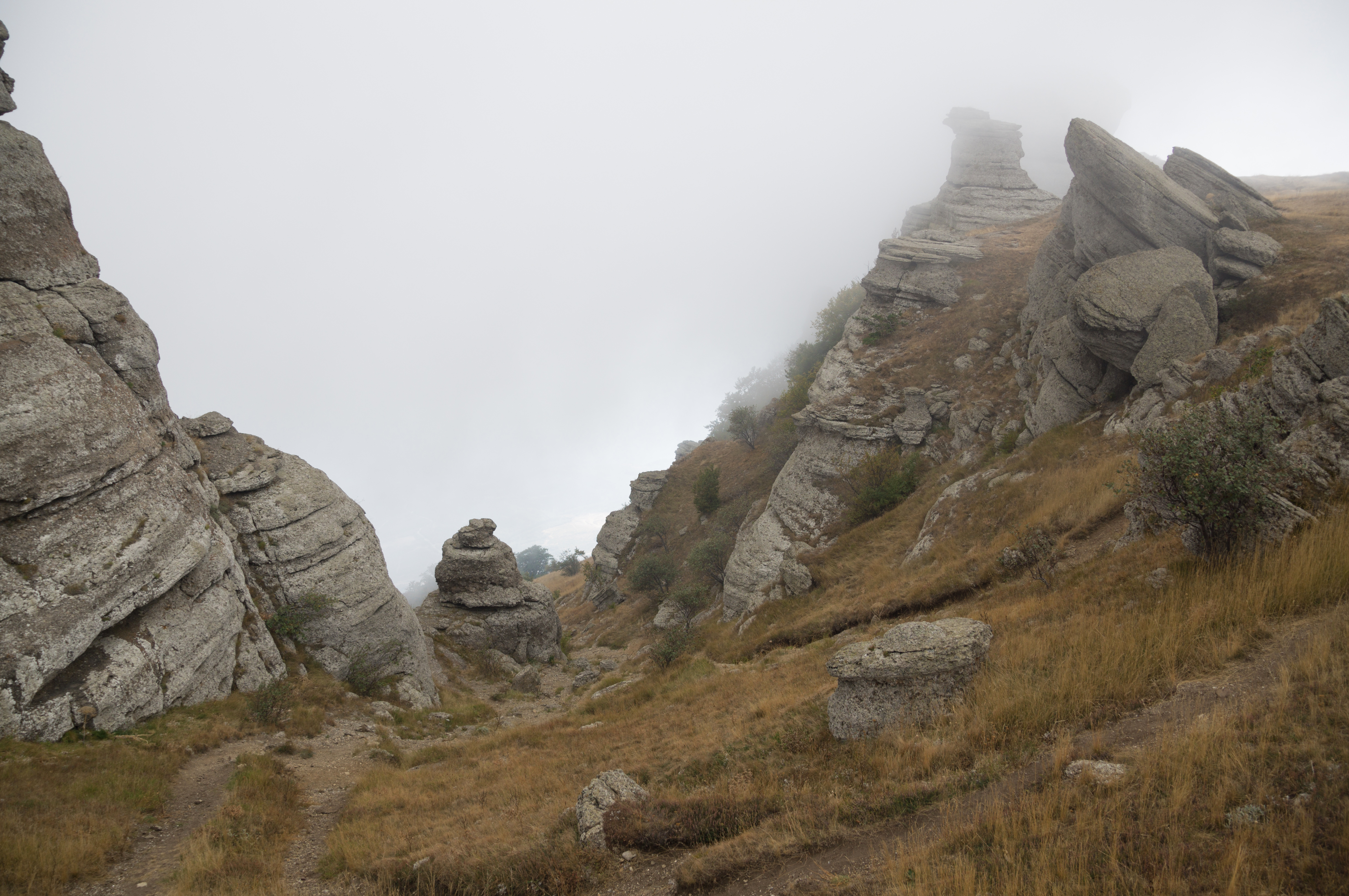
Southern Demirci in fog

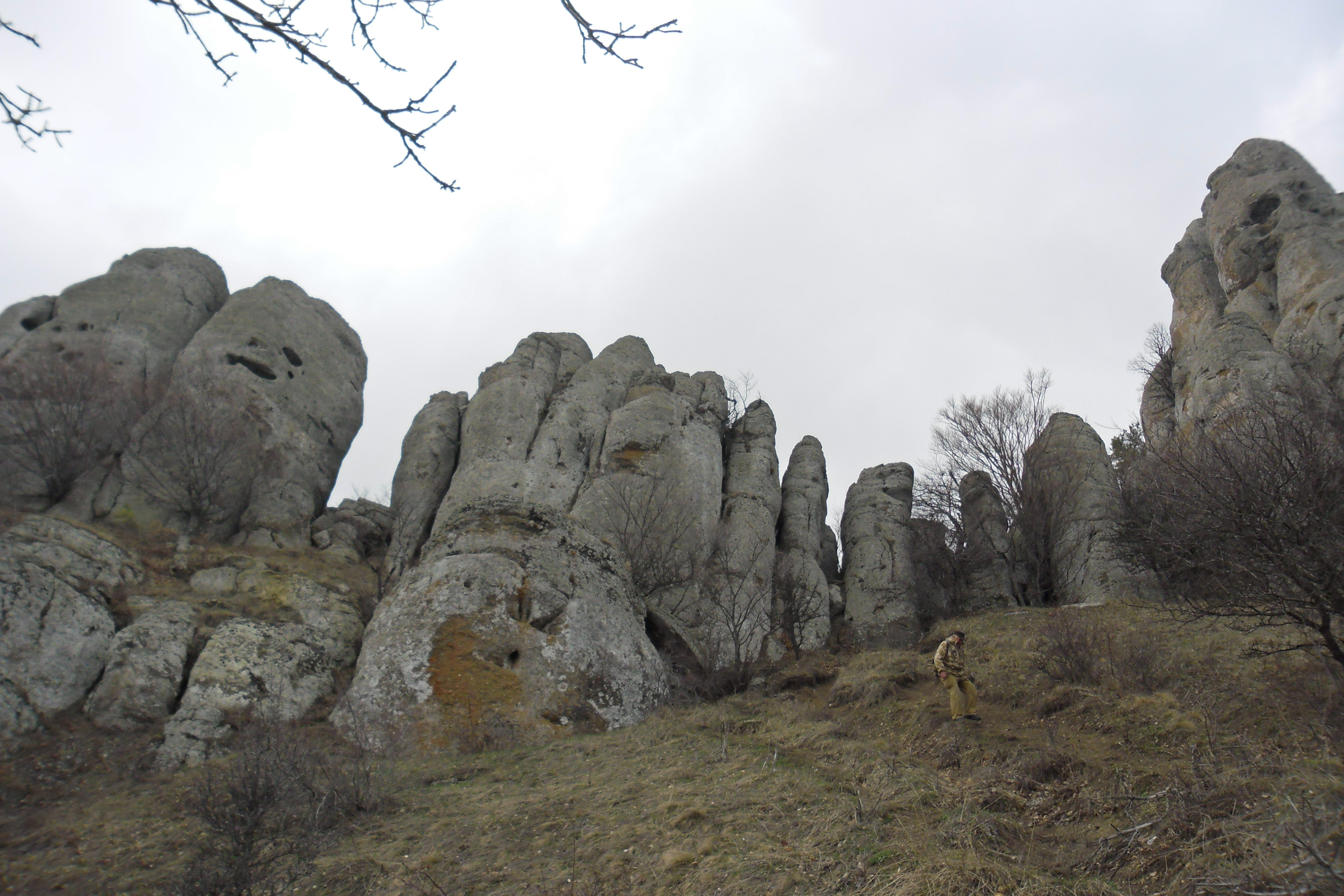
Conglomerates of rocks in the Valley of Ghosts

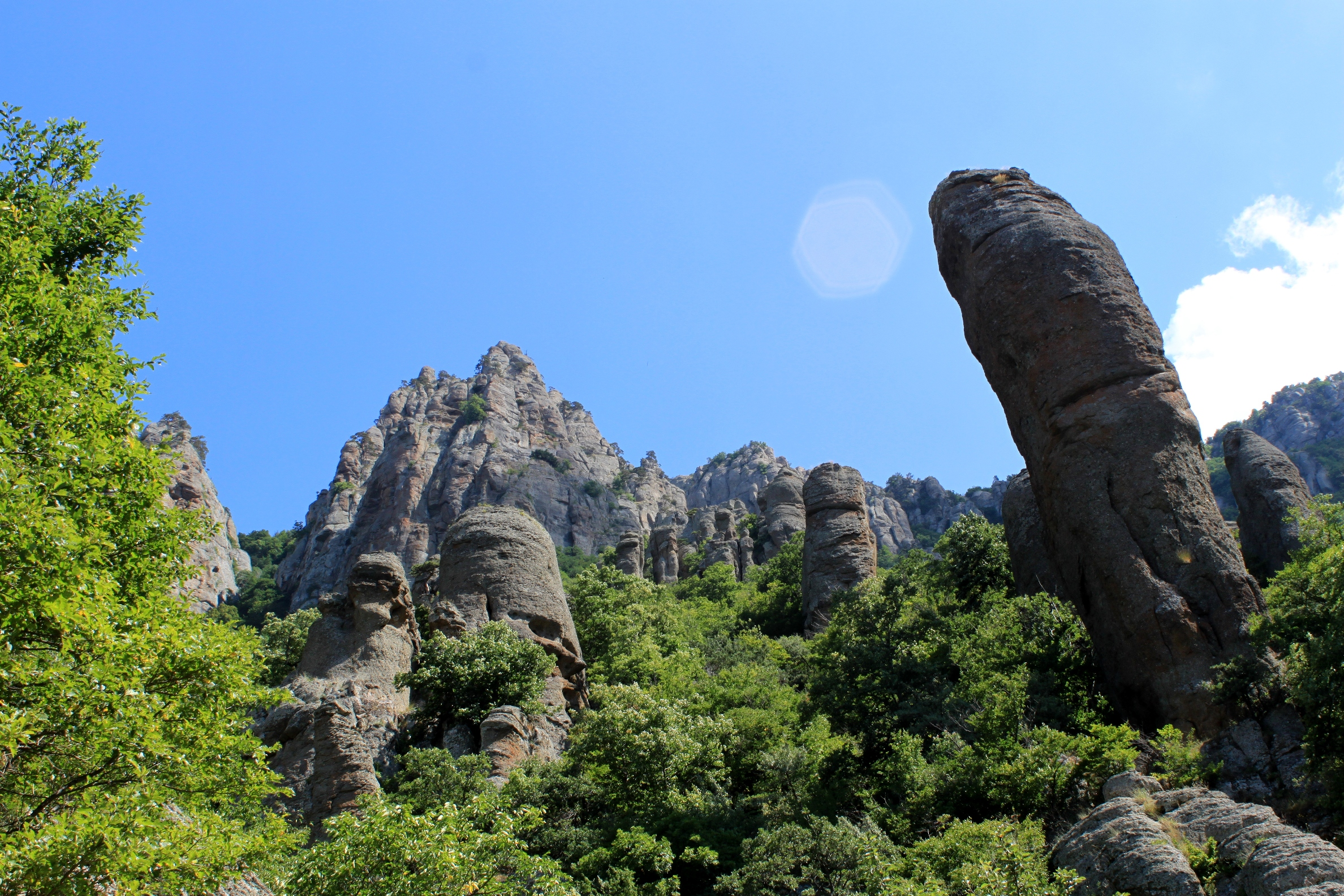
Southern Demirci's finger-like rocks

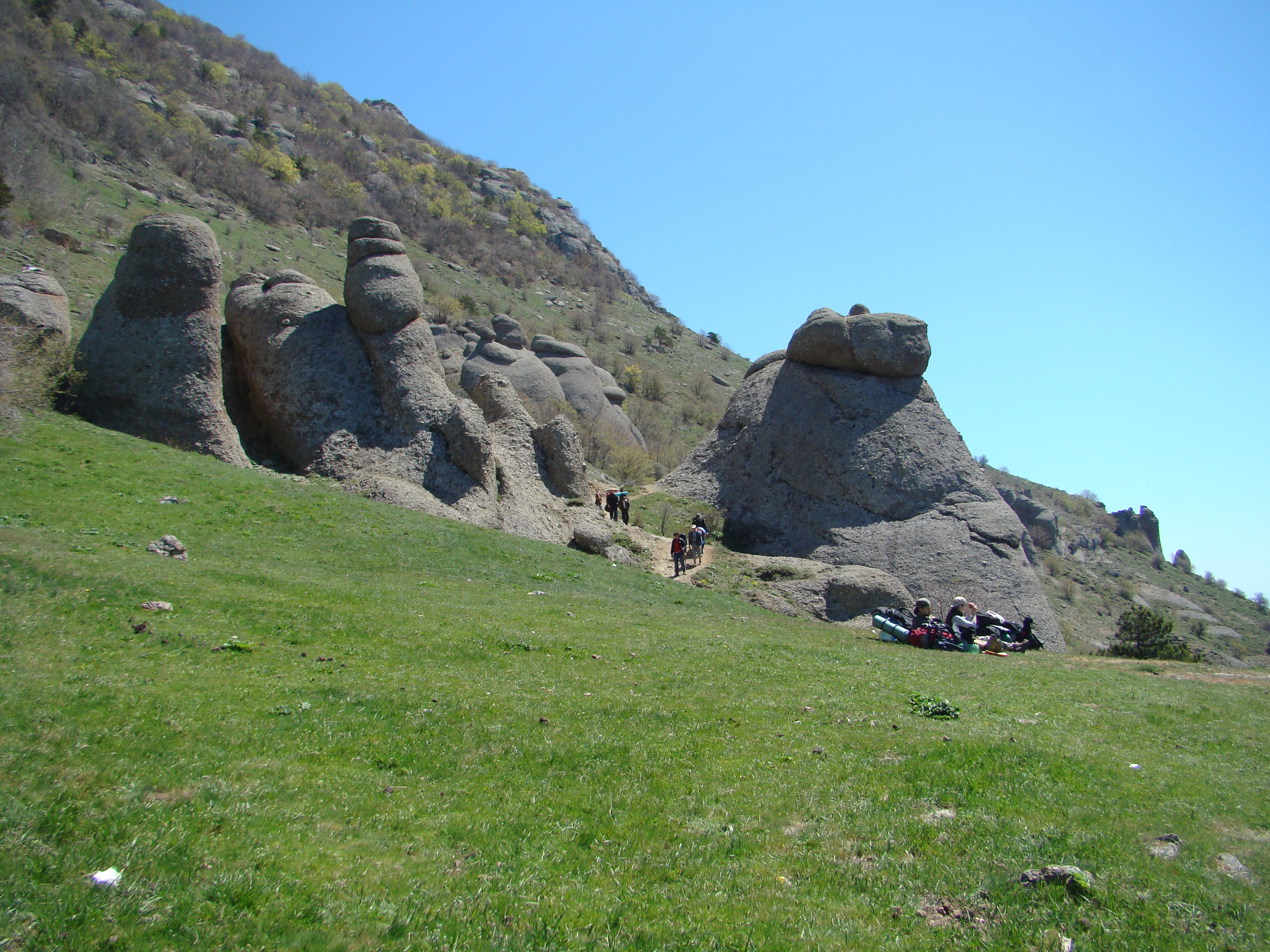
Rocks in the Valley of Ghosts

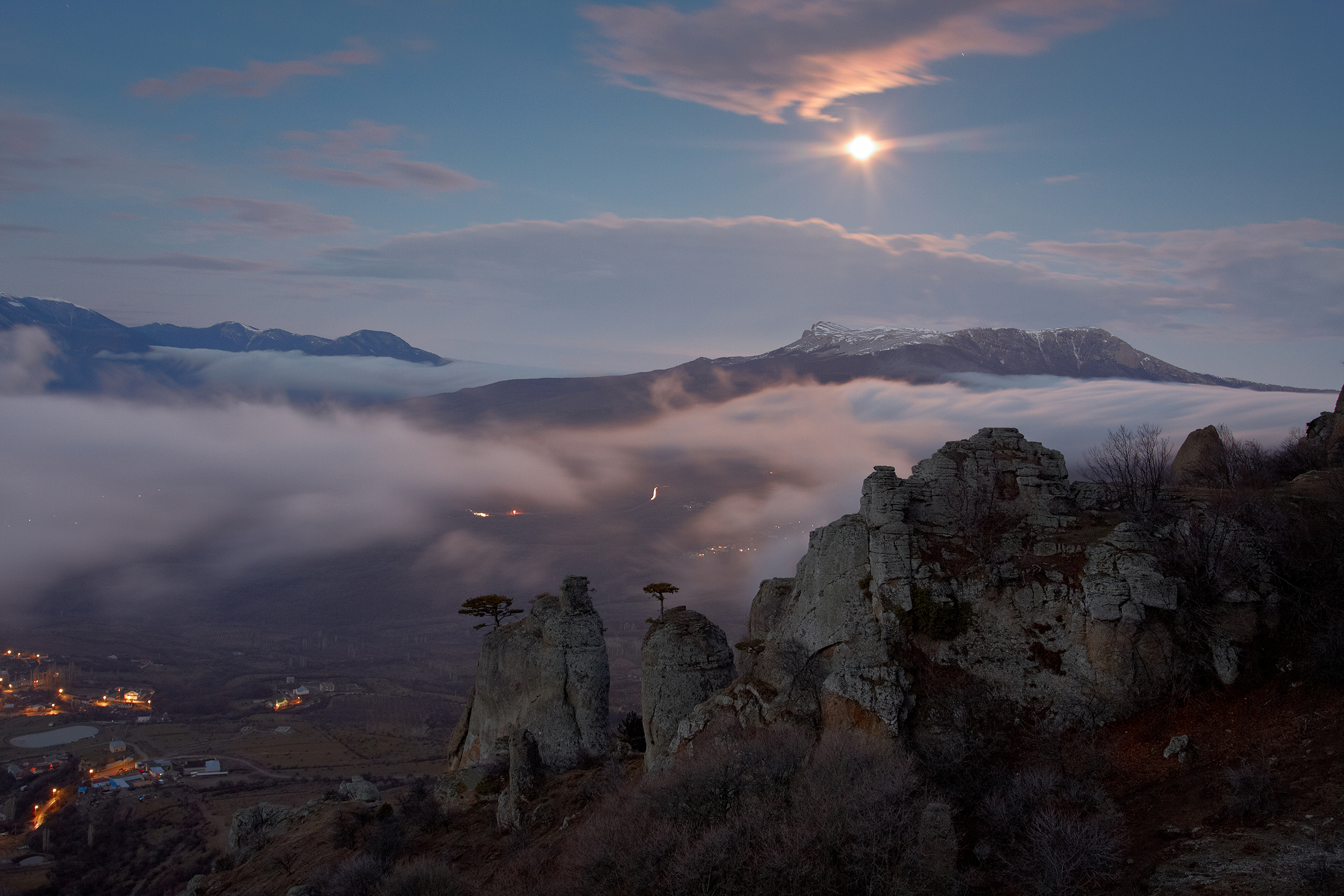
View from Southern Demirci during dawn

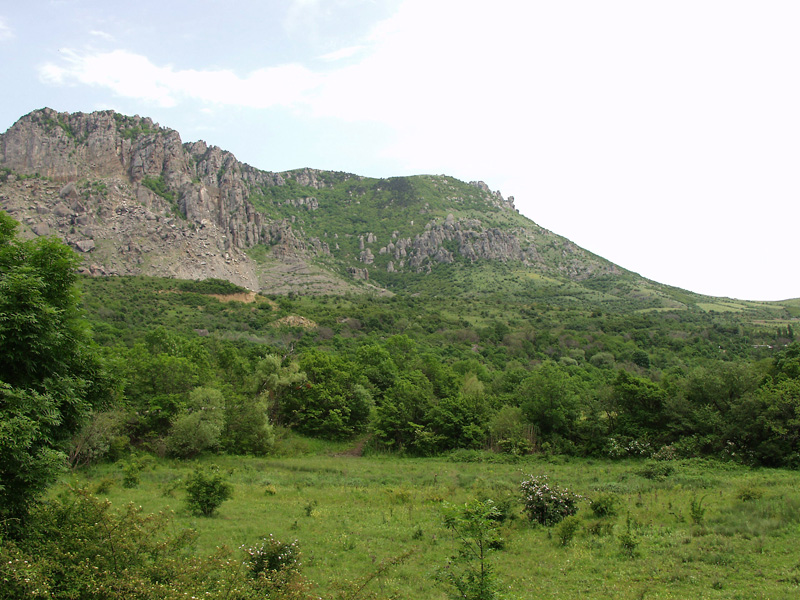
Southern Demirci

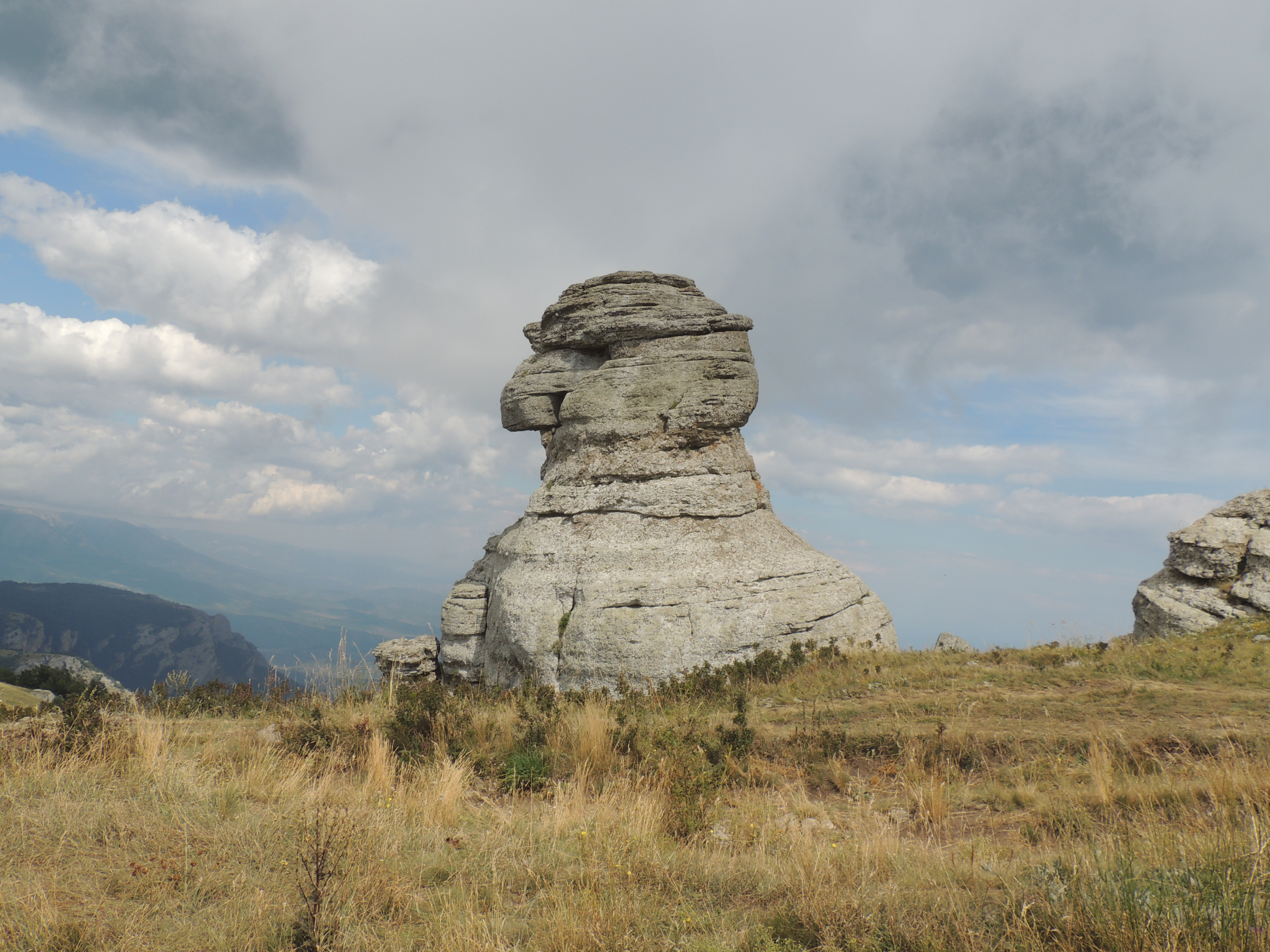
A rock called "Sphinx"

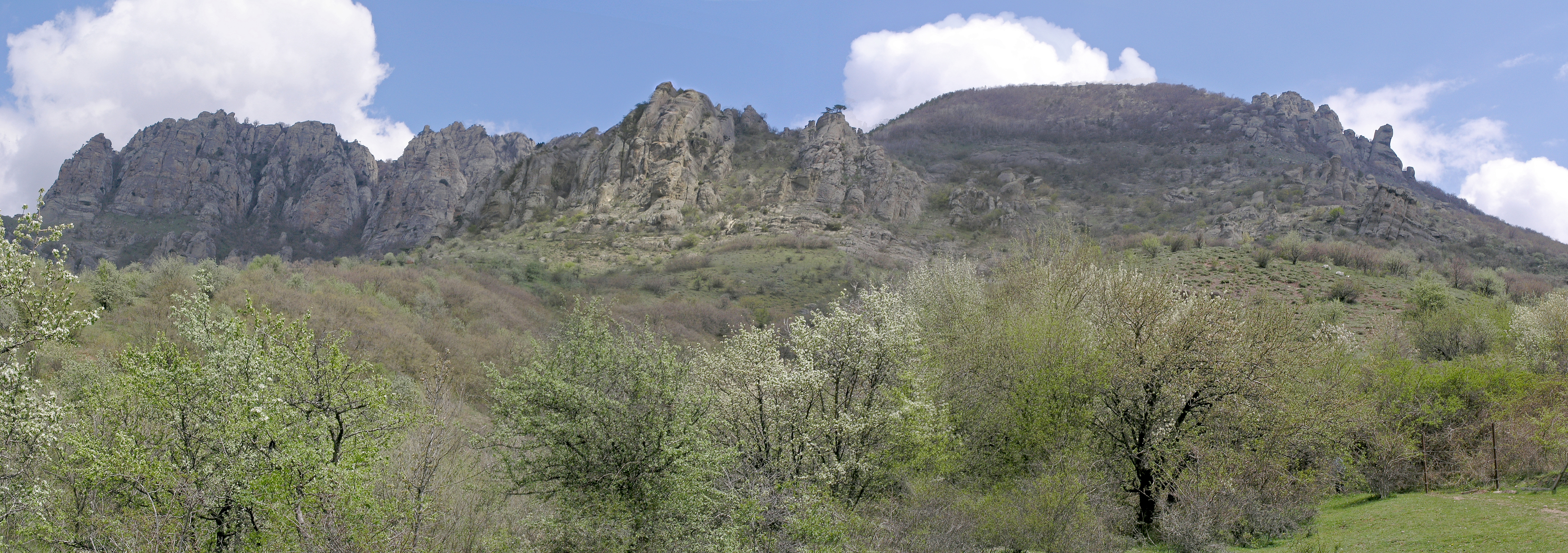
Southern Demirci seen as a whole

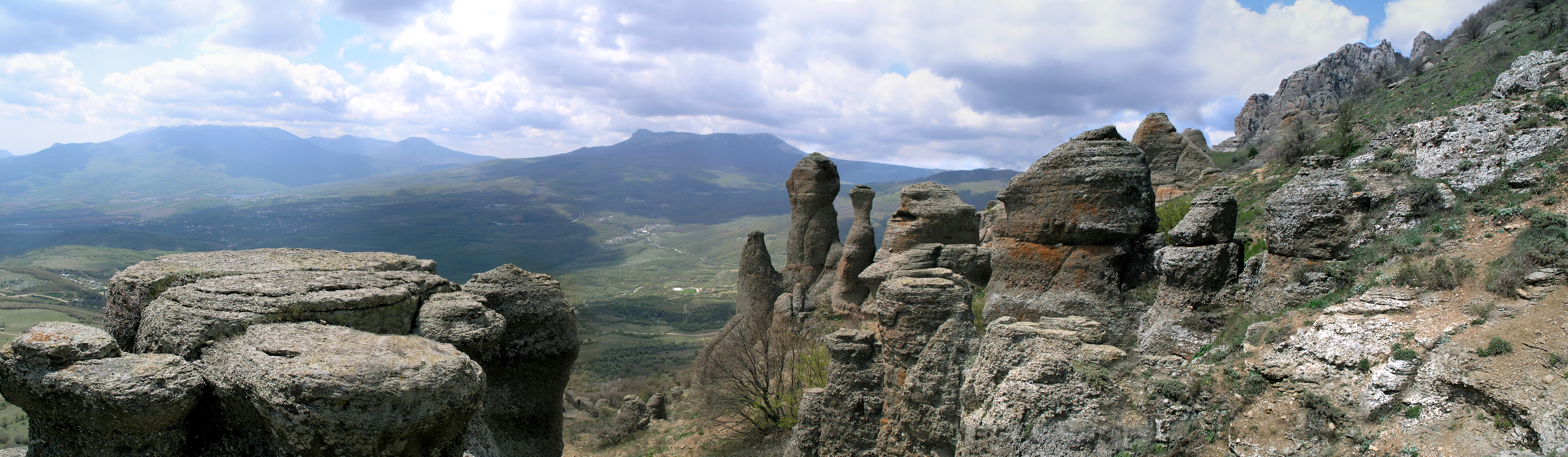
View from Southern Demirci on Babugan and Chatyr-Dag (The Valley of Ghosts)
