= Vyalova Cave =

Cave in Ukraine

Coordinates: 44°44′N 34°18′E

Vyalova Cave (Ukrainian: печера В'ялова; Russian: пещера Вялова) is a cave in a lower plateau of the Chatyrdag mountain, Crimea. It also has an 'old' name: Togerik-Alan-Hosar (Тогерик-Алан-Хосар).

The cave has a vertical entrance of 31 m (102 ft) depth, which gradually, at a depth about 16 m (52 ft), transforms into a steep, almost vertical, shaft. The total depth of the cave is 124 m (407 ft). It belongs to the Vyalova Cave system.

The cave is named after Russian speleologist Vyalov.

== Vyalova Cave system ==
Vyalova Caves system is a system of three caves that are located on a lower plateau of the Chatyrdag mountain, Crimea.

The system consists of three caves (has three entrances): Uchunzhu Cave, Vyalova Cave and Obval'naya Cave (or Landslip Cave, Crimea).
