= Djur-Djur =

Djur-djur
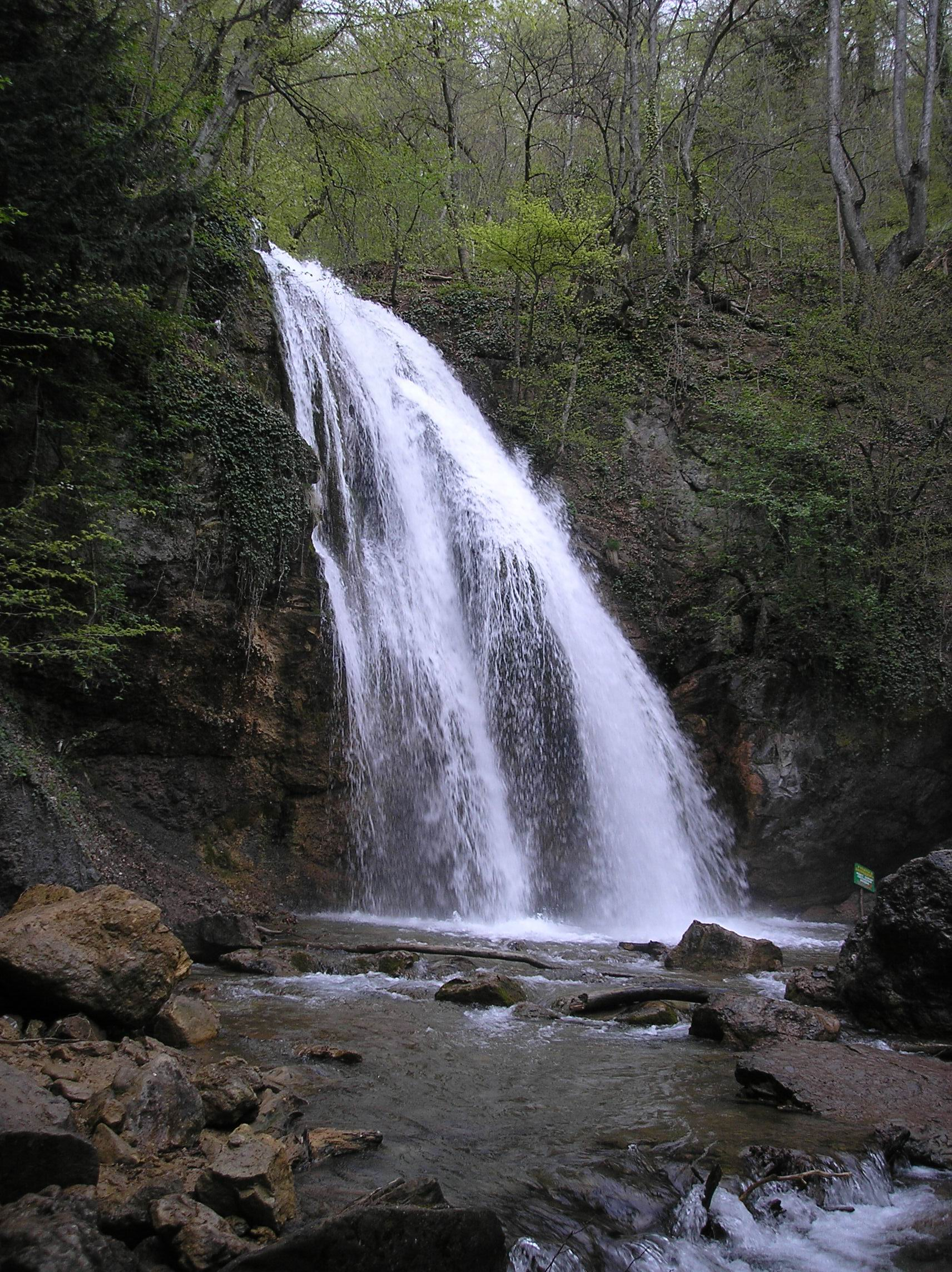

- Location within Crimea Location within Ukraine
- Location: Crimean Mountains, Crimea
- Coordinates: 44°48′12″N 34°28′03″E
- Elevation: 472 metres (1,549 ft)
- Total height: 16 metres (52 ft)
- Number of drops: 4
- Average width: 3 metres (9.8 ft)
- Watercourse: Eastern Ulu-Uzen'
- Average flow rate: 0.27

Djur-djur (Armenian: Ջուր-Ջուր; Crimean Tatar: Curcur) is a waterfall located on the Ulu-Uzen river in the Crimean Mountains of Crimea. Its height is 16 metres (52 ft). Djur-djur has never dried up, even in the dry years. Its water falls into a small lake, and then flows into the river channel, which flows into the sea near the village Soniachnohirsk.

== Waterfall name ==
The name of the waterfall «Murmurous», named as onomatopoeia running water. According to one version the name originates from Armenian language «djur» (Ջուր) (literally – "water-water"). According to another of Iranian languages «Djur» – an onomatopoeia of running water.

== Gallery ==
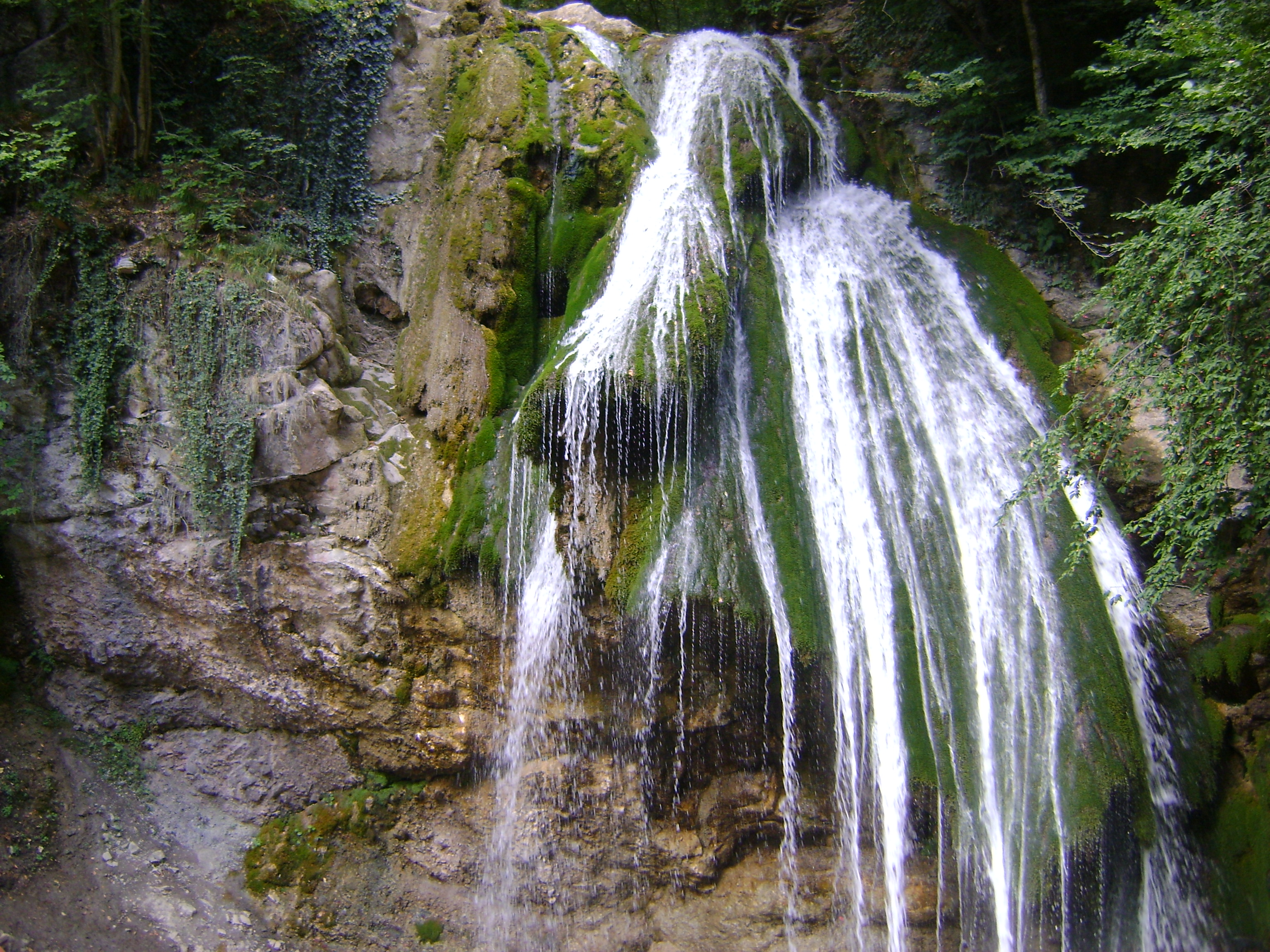

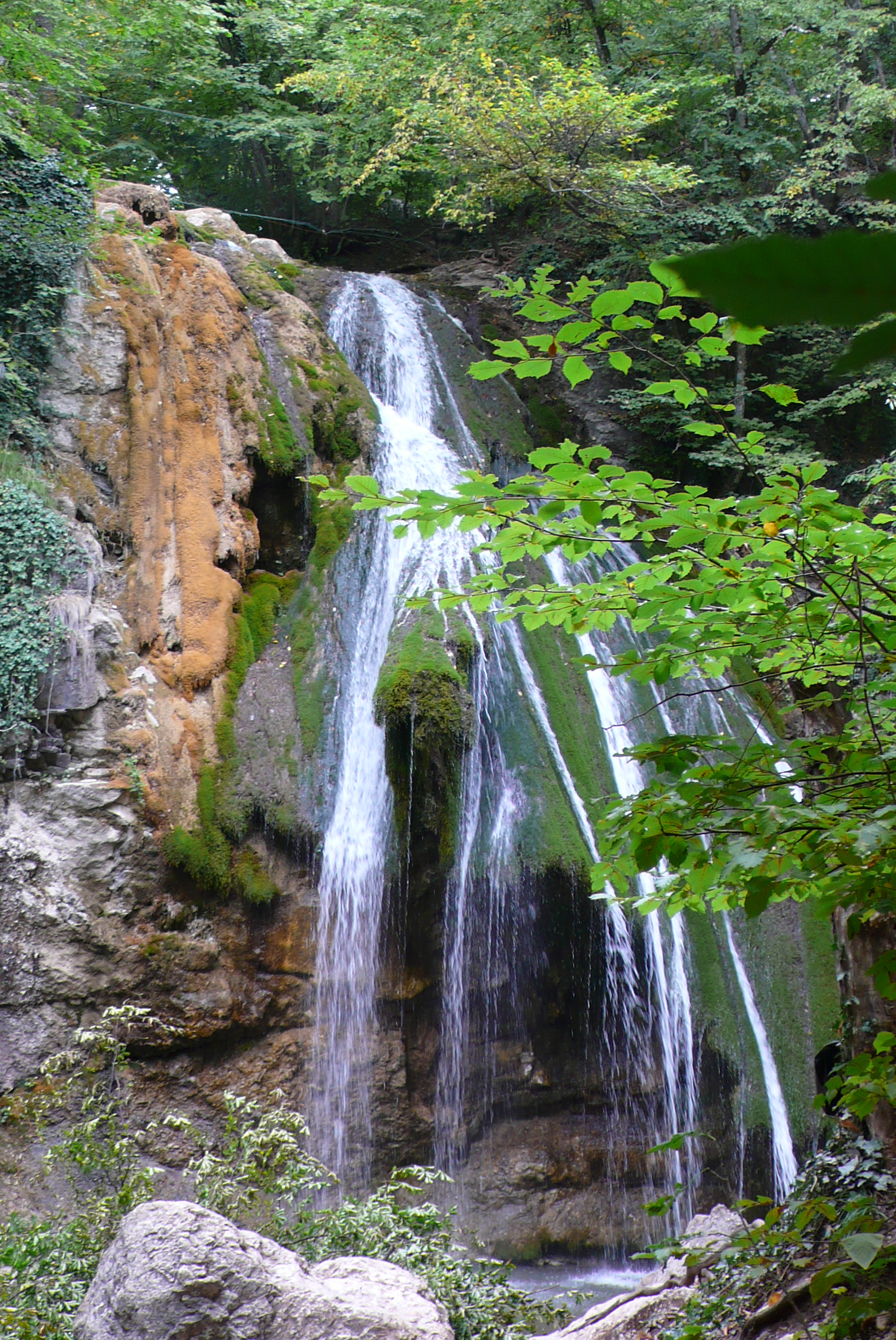

== See also ==
- Waterfalls of Ukraine
