= Nikolai A. Golovkinsky =

Russian geologist (1834–1897)

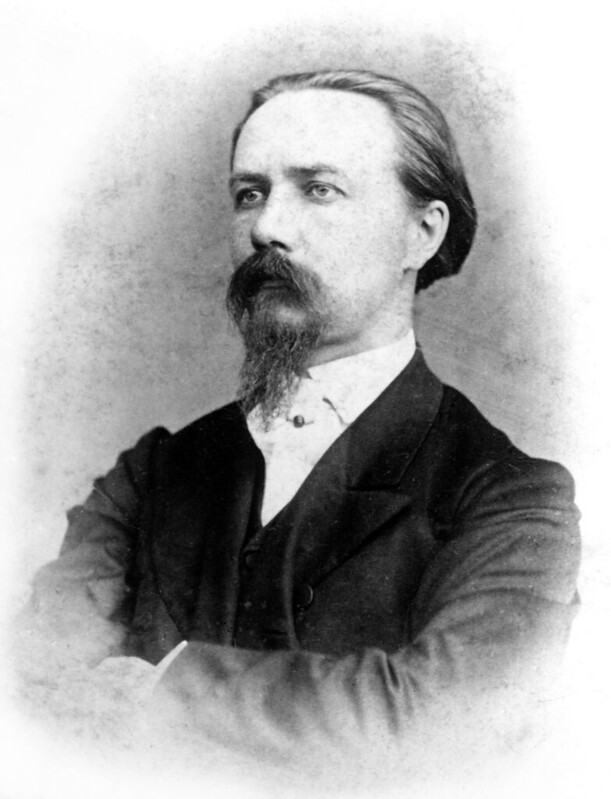
- Born: 29 April 1834
- Died: 1897 (aged 62–63)
- Known for: Golovkinsky-Walther’s Law
- Scientific career
- Workplaces: Kazan University

Nikolai A. Golovkinsky (Russian: Николай Алексеевич Головкинский; 29 April 1834 – 1897) was a Russian geologist who studied among other things the Paleozoic sediments of Tatarstan. He was a professor at the Kazan University.
