= Chatyr-Dag =

Mountainous massif in Crimea known for its caves

Coordinates: 44°44′N 34°18′E

- Crimean Tatar: Çatır Dağ
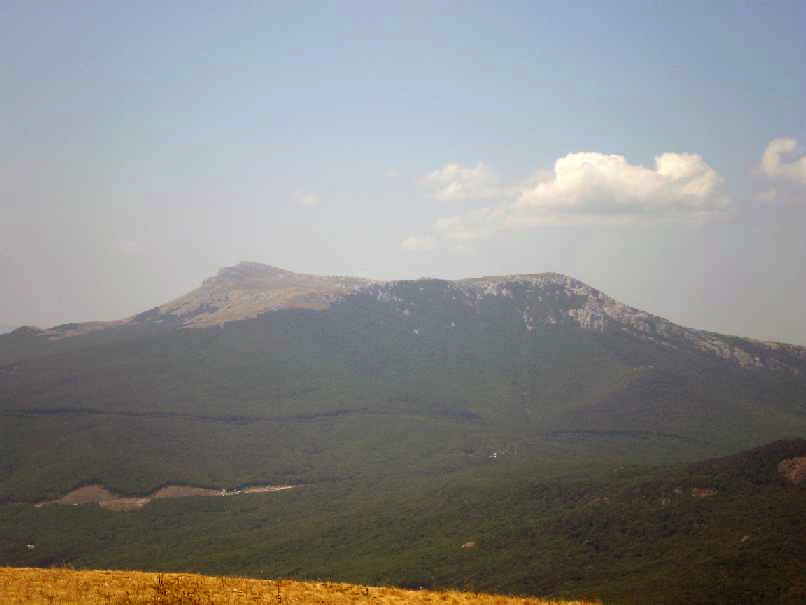

Highest point
- Elevation: 1,527 m (5,010 ft)
- Parent peak: Eklizi-Bourun

Geography
- Location: Crimea
- Parent range: Crimean Mountains

Eklizi-Bourun - western side of upper plateau

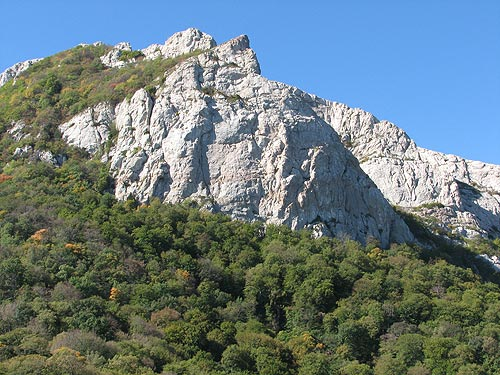
Angar-Burun - eastern side of upper plateau

Chatyr-Dag (Ukrainian: Чатир-Даг; Russian: Чатыр-Даг; Crimean Tatar: Çatır Dağ, lit. 'Tent Mountain') is a mountainous massif in Crimea, Ukraine, near the Simferopol-Alushta highway, and is known for its caves.

== Overview ==
The mountain consists of two plateaus: the lower (north) and the upper (south). The lower plateau slopes gently down to its northern side, which is covered in steppe grass. On its southern end (near the steep slope of the higher plateau), the lower plateau is covered with beech forests and juniper glades.

It has many hiking trails and several beautiful caves (listed below).

On the east side of the lower plateau there is a grove of yews.

The upper plateau has the shape of a giant bowl and on its rim; the highest peaks are each named. The upper plateau is covered with alpine meadows. Its slopes are very steep and offer some routes for multipitch climbing (rock climbing routes longer than length of one climbing rope). The highest peak is Eklizi-Bourun (1527 m above sea level).

Caves in the Chatyr-Dag massif include:

- Marble Caves
- Emine Bair Hosar cave
- Fur-tree cave
- Obvalnaya cave
- Vyalova cave
- Artuch-Koba
- Vyalova cave system

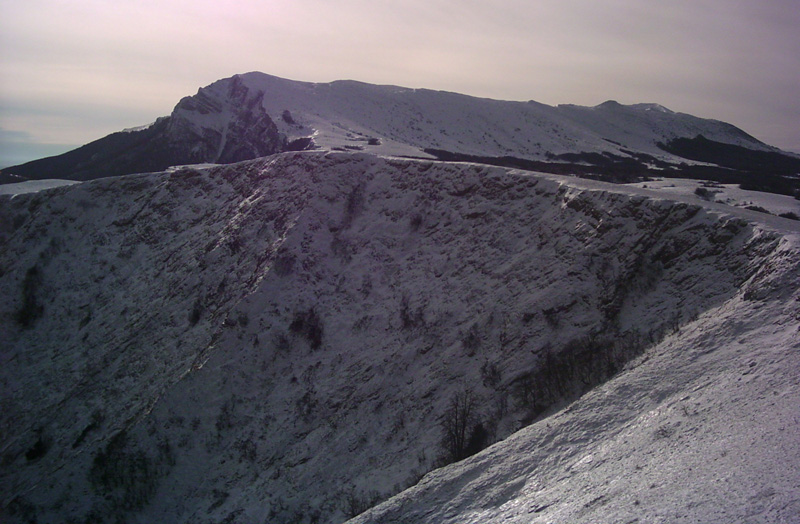
Upper plateau (winter 2004)

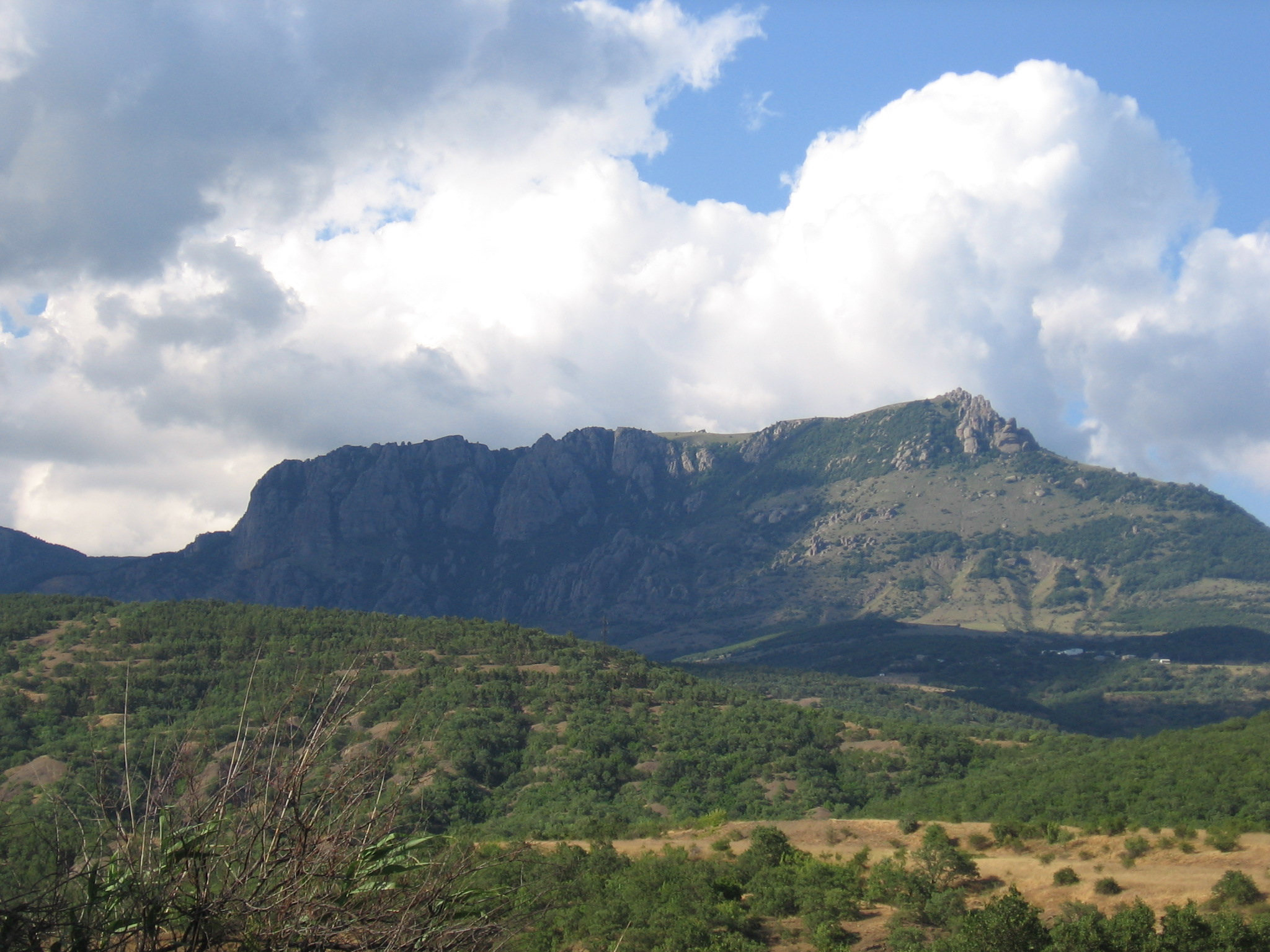
Chatyr-Dag mountain, view from the south

In 2014, Russia illegally annexed Crimea.

== See also ==
- Mangup
- The Valley Of Ghosts
- Kara Dag Mountain
