= Evgenii Wulff =

Russian biologist and botanist (1885–1941)

Evgenii Vladimirovich Wulff
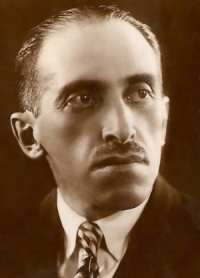
- Wulff in 1941
- Born: 6 June [O.S. 25 May] 1885; Simferopol, Russian Empire
- Died: 21 December 1941 (aged 56); Leningrad, Russian SFSR, Soviet Union
- Education: Imperial Moscow University (1906)
- Known for: Flora of Crimea, history of plant geography
- Scientific career
- Fields: botany, plant geography
- Workplaces: Nikitsky Botanical Garden; Tavrida University
- Author abbrev. (botany): E.Wulff

Evgenii Vladimirovich Wulff (Russian: Евгений Владимирович Вульф, romanized: Yevgeny Vladimirovich Vulf; 6 June [O.S. 25 May] 1885 – 21 December 1941) was a Russian and Soviet biologist, botanist and plant geographer.

== Career ==
Wulff was born in Crimea and studied at Moscow University from 1903 to 1906. He obtained his doctorate degree in biology from the University of Vienna, Austria, in 1909. He then returned to Crimea and took up a position at the famous Nikitsky Botanical Garden near Yalta. He worked there from 1914 to 1926, undertaking studies of the vegetation and flora of Crimea and founding the multi-volume Flora Taurica. From 1921 to 1926, he also was professor at the Tavrida University of Crimea.

He then moved to the Vavilov All-Union Institute of Crop Plants in Leningrad to expand his scientific studies. He took a particular interest in the history of plant geography. He published a monograph on this topic in 1932, which was translated to English and published in the West posthumously. This book has been hailed as one of the twentieth century's key writings in the evolution of plant geography . In 1934, he was made professor at the Pokrovsky Pedagogical Institute, where he taught botany parallel to his research at the Vavilov Institute. In 1936, he published his Historical Geography of Plants, of which an expanded version was published posthumously.

Wulff died in 1941 during the siege of Leningrad, when he was killed by an exploding bomb.

== Legacy ==
The leguminous shrub Chamaecytisus wulffii was named to his honour by Vitaly Krechetovich in 1945.
