= Dhzurla =

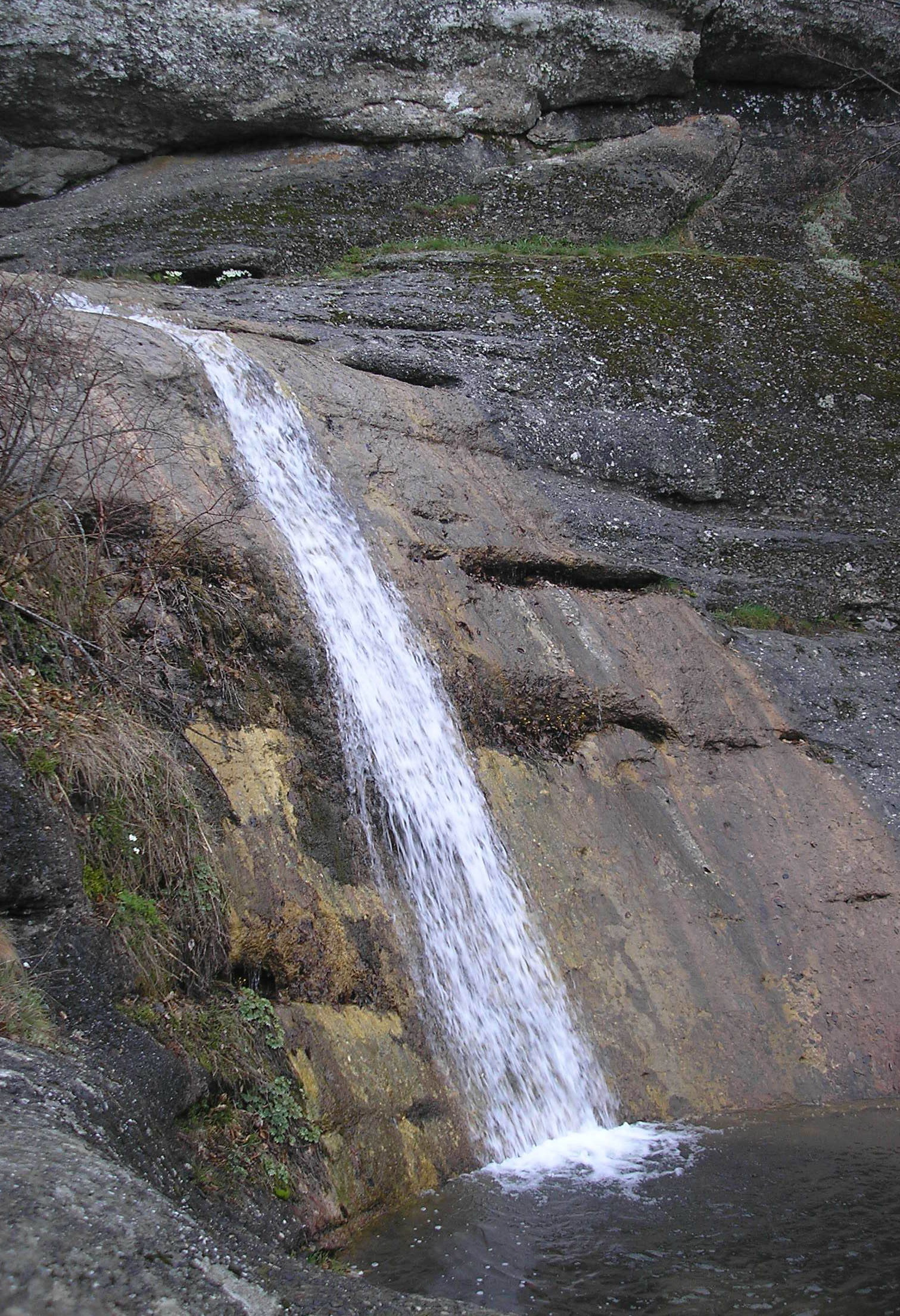

- Location within Crimea Location within Ukraine
- Location: Crimean Mountains, Crimea
- Coordinates: 44°46′05″N 34°25′31″E
- Elevation: 820 metres (2,690 ft)
- Total height: 6 metres (20 ft)
- Watercourse: Dhzurla river

Dhzurla (Ukrainian: Джурла) waterfall is located on the Dhzurla river in the Crimean Mountains of Crimea. It is about 6 metres (20 ft)high, and has a few cascades. The word “Dhzurla” comes from Crimean Tatar language and means “her who runs."

The downstream river is called Soter.

== See also ==
- Waterfalls of Ukraine
