= 2015 Mina crowd crush =

Crowd crush incident in Saudi Arabia

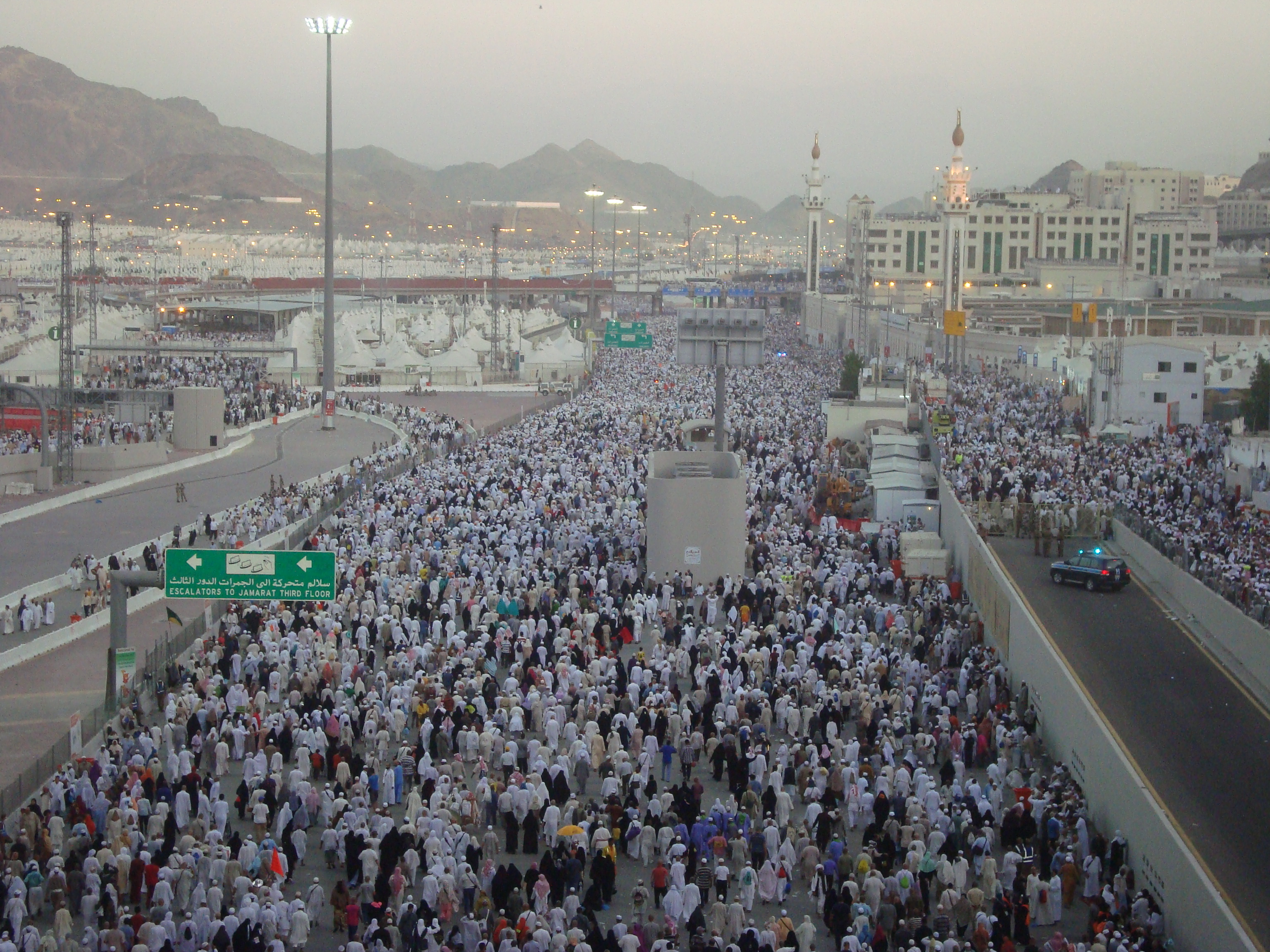
- The way to Jamaraat Bridge (2011)
- Date: 24 September 2015; 11 years ago
- Time: 09:00 AST (UTC+03:00)
- Location: Mina, Mecca, Saudi Arabia; 21°24′59.5″N 39°53′04.9″E
- Cause: Disputed
- Deaths: Estimates: 2,411 (AP); 2,070 (Reuters); 2,236 (AFP); 2,431 (Total/National); 769 (Saudi government)

On 24 September 2015, a fatal crowd crush resulted in the death of more than 2,000 individuals, many of whom were suffocated or crushed, during the annual Hajj pilgrimage in Mina, Mecca, Saudi Arabia, making it the deadliest Hajj disaster in history. Estimates of the number of dead vary: the Associated Press reported 2,411 dead, while Agence France-Presse reported 2,236 killed. Based on the total of the individual national reports cited in the table below (nationalities of victims), at least 2,431 people died. (Note: This figure is based on the total of people killed from the most recent sources used to create the "Nationalities of victims" table, and is calculated from those sources by Wikipedia editors. Note that the total of all deaths reported by nation (2,431) is greater than total deaths reported by most up-to-date sources (AP: 2,411 & AFP: 2,286). Some of those killed may have had multiple citizenships or some national counts or references may be incorrect.) The government of Saudi Arabia officially reported two days after the event that there had been 769 deaths and 934 injured. These figures remained official at the time of the next year's Hajj and were never updated. The largest number of victims were from Iran, followed by Mali and Nigeria.

The crush occurred in Mina at the intersection of streets 204 and 223 leading to Jamaraat Bridge. The cause of the disaster remains in dispute. The Mina disaster inflamed tensions between regional rivals Saudi Arabia and Iran, which were already elevated due to the wider turmoil in the Middle East, such as the Syrian Civil War and Yemeni Civil War. In a press conference held on the day of the incident, Saudi Ministry of Interior spokesman Mansour Al-Turki attempted to address most issues regarding the incident. He said in September 2015 that an investigation was ongoing, and that the exact cause of the overcrowding that resulted in the deadly crush had not yet been ascertained.

== Background ==
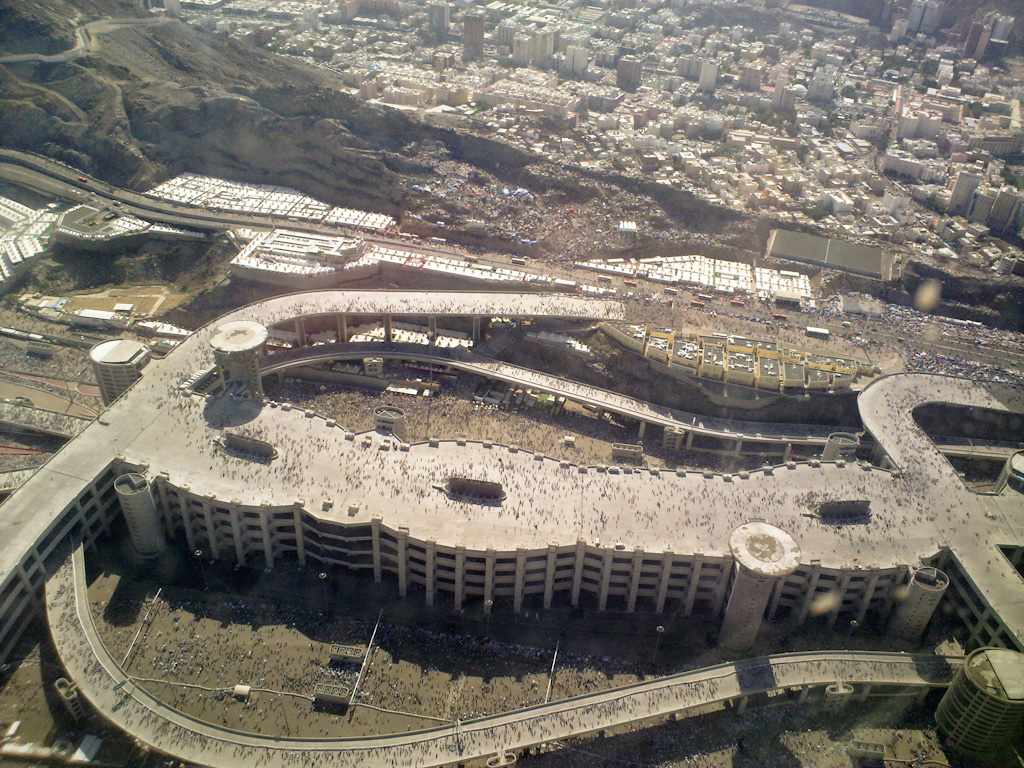
The Jamaraat Bridge complex

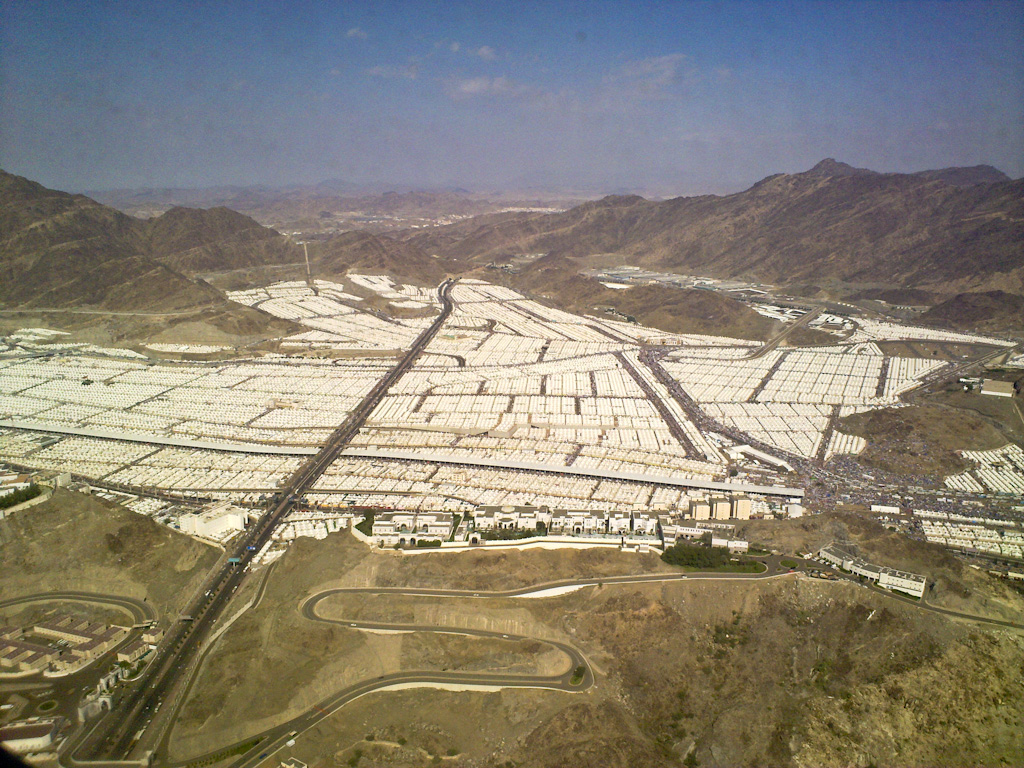
Tent city at Mina in 2009

2015 Mina disaster map–Area surrounding streets 204 and 223

The Hajj is an annual pilgrimage in Mecca prescribed as a duty for Muslims to perform at least once during their lifetime if they can afford to do so physically and financially. As traditionally performed, the Hajj consists of a series of rites including the Stoning of the Devil (Arabic: رمي الجمرات ramī al-jamarāt) which is done at the Jamaraat Bridge in Mina, a district a few miles east of Mecca. The Jamaraat Bridge is a pedestrian bridge from which pilgrims can throw pebbles at the three jamrah ("pebble") pillars. The stoning ritual is the last major ritual and the part of the Hajj with the most potential for disaster given its large crowds, confined spaces, and precise scheduling.

The 2015 Hajj occurred during a time of regional turmoil (including wars in Syria, Iraq, Yemen, and Libya), the highest temperatures in Mecca in 20 years and the threat of MERS.

A number of Hajj-related crowd crush disasters have occurred in the past, with 1,426 people being suffocated and trampled to death in a 1990 tunnel tragedy, and at least 701 people killed in crowd crushes between 1991 and 2005. 346 people were killed in a similar Jamaraat incident in 2006, which prompted the Saudi government to improve the infrastructure of the city and its procession routes.

== Disaster ==
Nationalities of victims
Nationality	Dead	Missing	Ref.
Afghanistan	2	6	
Algeria	46	3	
Bangladesh	137	53	
Benin	52	41	
Burkina Faso	22	7	
Burundi	1	6	
Cameroon	106	28	
Chad	52	50	
China	4	0	
Djibouti	2	3	
Egypt	190	45	
Ethiopia	53	0	
France	85	0	
Gambia	2	0	
Ghana	17	17	
India	114	10	
Indonesia	129	0	
Iran	464	0	
Iraq	1	0	
Ivory Coast	52	7	
Jordan	2	1	
Kenya	12	0	
Lebanon	1	0	
Libya	10	7	
Malaysia	1	0	
Mali	312	34	
Mauritius	5	0	
Morocco	42	1	
Myanmar	6	5	
Netherlands	1	0	
Niger	78	41	
Nigeria	274	43	
Oman	1	0	
Pakistan	83	7	
Philippines	1	0	
Senegal	62	0	
Somalia	8	0	
Sri Lanka	1	1	
Sudan	30	2	
Tanzania	32	7	
Tunisia	15	0	
Turkey	7	0	
Uganda	1	2	
Total	2,431	427	

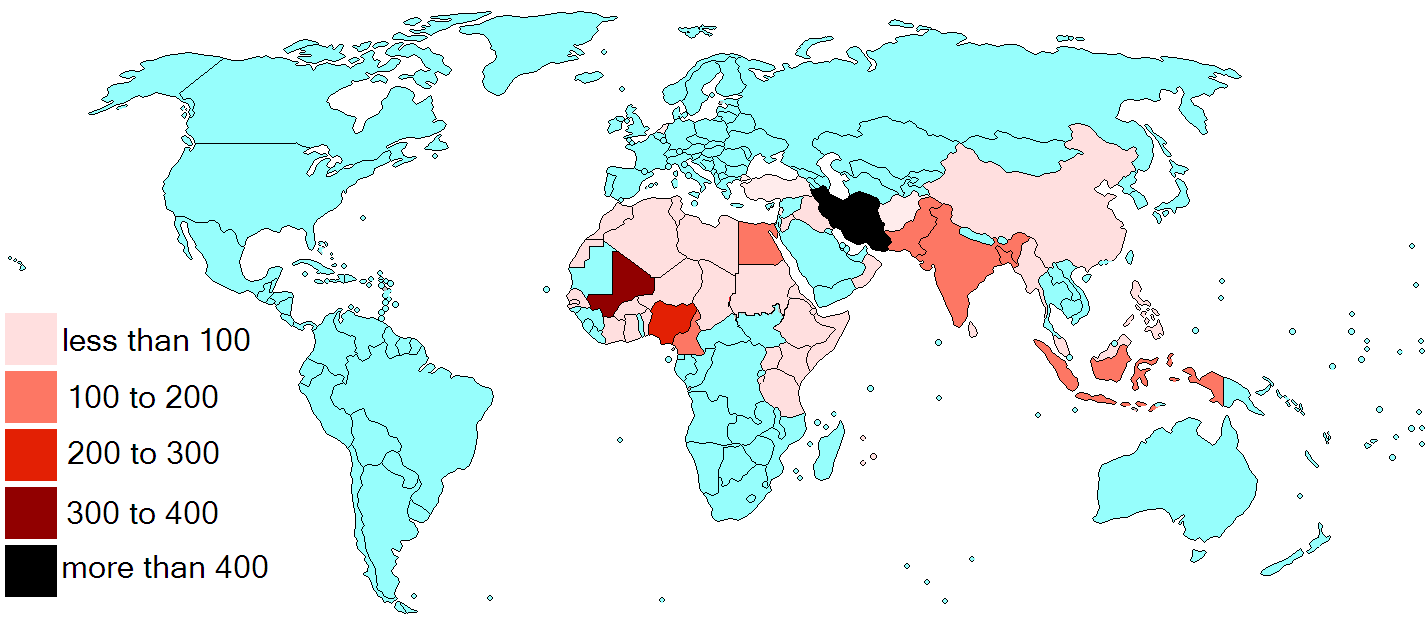
Nationalities of victims of the 2015 Mina stampede by number of deceased.

According to a statement by the Saudi civil defence directorate, the crush occurred Thursday 24 September 2015 at 09:00 Mecca time (06:00 UTC) at the junction between street 204 and 223 as pilgrims were en route to the Jamaraat Bridge. The Saudi Interior Ministry stated that the crush began when two large groups of pilgrims intersected from different directions onto the same street. The area was not identified previously as dangerous. The junction lay between two pilgrim camp sites. The International Business Times reported that the governor of Mecca Province and Saudi Arabia's director of the main Hajj committee, Prince Khalid bin Faisal Al Saud, blamed the crush outside the holy city on "some pilgrims with African nationalities"; prompting condemnation from several African government officials.

In a press conference held the day of the incident, spokesman of the Ministry of Interior Mansour Al-Turki attempted to address the incident. He said that an investigation was ongoing, that the exact causes for crowding that resulted in the deadly crush on Mina Street 204 are yet to be ascertained. He explained that "Street number 204 is a road leading from the camps to the Jamarat Bridge. What happened was that a group of pilgrims on buses were allowed to descend onto the pathways that lead to the Jamarat Bridge at a time that wasn’t allocated to them," Al Arabiya News Channel's correspondent in Mina, Saad Al-Matrafi said. "As they neared the area, they converged with an existing group of people who were already in the area, which pushed the area to over capacity."

One day after the Mina crush disaster, Saudi media publicized a statement by the Grand Mufti of Saudi Arabia, Abdul-Aziz ibn Abdullah Al ash-Sheikh, exonerating Crown Prince Muhammad bin Nayef (known as "MBN") from responsibility for the disaster, as his title of Minister of the Interior holds him accountable for safety issues at the Mecca shrine. The Grand Mufti's statement, which characterized the incident as "beyond human control", "inevitable", and attributable to "fate", immunized MBN against possible domestic criticism.

=== Casualties ===
The exact casualty total for the Mina crowd collapse is disputed. The Saudi government officially reported 769 deaths, a number that was not changed, while Iranian media sources have proposed totals as great as 4,173, after a withdrawn early number given by Saudi authorities. Independent estimates range between 2,236 and 2,431 (see nationalities of victims table) people killed, with the most recent Associated Press estimate giving a death toll of 2,411, based on "media reports and officials comments from 36 of the over 180 countries that sent citizens to the hajj".

Estimates of the injured and missing also vary greatly; Saudi reports claim 934 injured; Iranian reports are much higher, estimating more than 2,000 injuries. On the day of the disaster, the Saudi Civil Defence directorate stated that casualties were of multiple nationalities and announced the deployment of 4,000 personnel to the crush site alongside 220 emergency response units. Pilgrims were redirected away from the crush site, and the Saudi Red Crescent Authority was mobilised. Medics at Mina's emergency hospital said they alone received almost 700 people on the day of the incident. The eight hospitals around the Hajj landmarks and the six main hospitals in the city of Mecca were operating at full capacity after the crush, medics said.

By 2 October 2015, the Saudi Arabia Health Ministry stated they had completed the DNA profiling of all unidentified pilgrims who were killed or injured in the crush. DNA samples of the next of kin of Hajj stampede victims were collected at Al-Nour Specialist Hospital, Mecca.

=== Prominent victims ===
- Ghazanfar Roknabadi, an Iranian diplomat who served as Iranian ambassador to Lebanon from 2010 to 2014, was missing, and confirmed dead on 25 November 2015. Iran's Iranian Students News Agency (ISNA) reported that the body of Roknabadi, who had been reported as missing, was identified by DNA testing and visual confirmation by two of his brothers. While some Iranian officials had said Roknabadi was alive and had been kidnapped by Saudi Arabia covertly, Iranian news source Mehr News Agency reported that he died in the crush. Iran stated it would conduct independent medical tests to determine whether Roknabadi did die in the Mina disaster.
  Saudi Arabia had initially denied that Roknabadi was present at the 2015 Hajj. Iranian Foreign Ministry Spokeswoman Marzieh Afkham, on 28 September 2015, referring to Saudi media reports that say they do not have any official record of the entry of Ghazanfar Asl Roknabadi into the kingdom, described the reports as "incorrect" and "hasty", saying the ministry has documents showing that Riyadh had approved an ordinary Hajj visa for the dead diplomat. Iranian media also released footage on 29 September 2015, showing Roknabadi's presence in Mina. The passport showing his entrance into Saudi Arabia was also released by Iranian media.
- Adeola Maurufudeen Adefolabi, from Lagos, Nigeria, was a one-term member representing Ifako-Ijaiye in the lower chamber of the National Assembly and former chairman of Ifako Ijaiye and Ojokoro Local Government Areas.
- Tijani El-Miskin was a professor of Islamic Studies at the University of Maiduguri and a former director of a special training course for the students of Arabic studies at the University of Maiduguri in Gamboru. He also was the Chairman of the Borno State Pilgrims Board.
- Hajiya Bilkisu Yusuf was the first female editor from the northern part of Nigeria. She studied political science in Nigeria and the United States and journalism in Russia. After that, Bilkisu Yusuf pursued a successful career in journalism in Nigeria, working for the Daily Trust and Leadership newspapers and several local editions in Kano and Kaduna states.
- Mufti Mohammed Farooq, a prominent Indian Islamic scholar who was to perform Hajj, has been missing since the stampede. Farooq, a senior religious scholar, is a prolific writer and has authored more than 50 books on a range of subjects, including Hadith and Fiqh, in Urdu and Hindi. He is the founder and principal of the Jamia Mahmoodia school in Meerut.

Other prominent victims included:

- Algeria: M. Djaâfar—Husband of Algerian Minister for Family and Women Nouara Saâdia
- Iran:
  - Ahmad Fahima—Senior Iranian diplomat – First Secretary to the Holy See
  - Mohammad Sadeq Akhavan—Deputy Director of the Centre for Dispute Resolution Councils Iran's judiciary
  - Mohammad Rahim Aghaeipour—Iranian Diplomat, Ambassador to Slovenia
  - Mohsen Haji Hassani Kargar reciter of Qur'an a world winner of International Quran Recital Competition in 2015
  - Hassan Danesh winner of Qur'an reciting competitions in 2012 and 2015.
- Iraq: Ismail Hamid Zair—Brigadier, Baghdad Crimes Unit
- Nigeria:
  - Musa Hassan Alkali—Justice, Nigerian Court of Appeal
  - Bello Gidan Hamma—Chairman, Illela Local Government Area
  - Abdulkadir Jega—Justice, Nigerian Court of Appeal
  - Shehu Kontagora—Niger State Accountant General
  - Faisal Musa—Member, Katsina State House of Assembly
  - Abbas Ibrahim Sambo—Emir of Zing
  - Abdullahi T. Yeldu—Member, Kebbi State House of Assembly
- Pakistan: Assad Murtaza Gilani—Former Pakistani Member of Parliament
- Senegal:
  - Gnilane Diouf—Mother of footballer Mame Biram Diouf
  - Abdoulaye Diaw—Senegalese National Technical Director, Football
- Sudan: Talaat Abdel-Razeq—Sudanese Major General, Air Defense Commander

== Eyewitness accounts ==
Early statements by eyewitnesses indicated that the crush was caused by the closure of the eastern part of Street 206, which forced pilgrims to travel on Street 223, colliding with a mass of people moving the opposite direction on Street 204.

Alhaji Samaila Dabai Yombe, Deputy Governor of the Nigerian state of Kebbi, who was present at the incident, stated that the deaths happened due to a blockage of the route to Jamaraat Bridge.

What actually happened was that all the pilgrims scheduled to throw Jamrat at that time were channeled to one particular street. At a time we got to a certain point around 8:00 a.m., a military vehicle was set across to create a barrier and then some of the Saudi soldiers were standing by, suggesting that you cannot go beyond that point. [...] About 5,000 people coming from the same direction were not aware of the road block in front, which resulted to a tight and stationary human traffic, which made it very difficult for us to even stand. So, we continued to squat to make room for fresh air while the temperature was about 47 degrees Celsius. [...] Pilgrims, in efforts to get fresh air, attempted to scale fences of tents on both sides of the road. Very few succeeded, while most people just succumb to the situation. It was at this juncture that we saw dead bodies piling up around us.

Ishaq Akintola, a Nigerian Professor of Islamic eschatology, gave an eyewitness account of the disaster:

on that fateful day, we found out that some of those who had thrown their own stones made a U-turn instead of moving ahead to take a detour. They came through the route meant for entrance and not exit. They came towards us. They were in a very large group and the road was not spacious enough to allow a free flow of those of us coming to throw stones at the Devil and those who had stoned the Devil. The road could not take those coming and those going. And I discovered that most of those who took the wrong way were Egyptians [...] as I heard them speak the Egyptian dialect of Arabic. [...] I studied in Egypt for five years. I know the dialect.

== Investigation ==
=== Saudi official statements ===
In a statement released by the Saudi embassy, Foreign Minister Adel al-Jubeir stated,

The Custodian of the Two Holy Mosques has directed to launch a thorough investigation that will be transparent [...] We will reveal the facts when they emerge, and we will not hold anything back. If mistakes were made, those who made them will be held accountable, and we will make sure that we will learn from this in order to ensure that it doesn't happen again."

A few weeks after the incident, the Saudi Vice Minister of Health officially announced 4,173 people dead in this incident in a press release, however, this page was removed from the website within three hours and requesting it would redirect the visitor to the homepage. The Saudi Minister of Health claimed that the published death toll was false in a Twitter post. Fars News, an official news agency of Iran, provided a walkthrough video to accessing the webpage assuming it was out of reach due to many page requests.

Saudi Crown Prince Muhammad bin Nayef supervised the official investigation. Saudi newspapers reported that on 18 October 2015 bin Nayef talked to the investigators and urged them to "continue their efforts to find the causes of the accident, praying to Allah Almighty to accept the martyrs and wishing the injured a speedy recovery". However, Saudi Arabia, as of October 2015, has not yet released any findings by their investigators.

Prompted by difficulties in identifying bodies after the Mina disaster, Saudi Arabian Deputy Minister of Health, Hamad Al-Duwailie, announced plans to require all Hajj pilgrims to wear an electronic bracelet containing identity information. Al-Duwailie also said that Saudi Ministry of Health would upgrade its current Hajj and Umrah committee to a permanent coordinating body within the Ministry. In January 2016, the Saudi Shura Council recommended "raising the capacity of roads leading to the Jamarat facility, and to the accommodation areas in Mina" as well as more studies on Hajj-related transportation flow.

=== Recommendations by independent experts ===
Najmedin Meshkati, Professor of Engineering and International Relations at the University of Southern California, who is an expert in accident investigation, recommended in a self-authored opinion piece in the World Post that,

the Saudi government should embark on the immediate creation of an independent investigation commission/panel. This interdisciplinary commission/panel should be chaired by a nationally renowned Saudi statesman or scholar, with members selected from Saudi Arabia and affected countries based on their technical expertise and to include responsible governmental entities, first responder agencies, and academics of requisite disciplines for accident investigation. [...] And it should be empowered by the subpoena power and charged to conduct a comprehensive, systematic and interdisciplinary investigation by employing the system-oriented, robust 'AcciMap' methodology to write the most technically-sound report on the root-causes of this tragedy.

Amer Shalaby is a Professor of Civil Engineering at the University of Toronto's Transportation Research Institute, former Hajj pilgrim, and consultant to Saudi government on crowd management. Shalaby, who specializes in transportation planning for large-scale events, proposes using "smart phones and other static and dynamic sensors" to provide authorities real-time information that could identify potential trouble places during the Hajj. He also suggests that "some of the effective methods of highway traffic flow management, such as flow metering, could be adapted for streamlining crowd flows in Mecca".

Keith Still, Professor of Crowd Science at Manchester Metropolitan University in Britain, who helped redesign the Jamaraat (the pillars representing the devil stoned by pilgrims) after a disaster in 2004, said there was criticism at the time that the upgrades at the Jamaraat had not been extended to other areas. He said "For complex systems that flow in and out, if you make one change along the way it can have knock-on and ripple effects elsewhere. Change any one part of system with 3 million people, and there's a danger of an accident like this."

Mohammed Ajmal, a physician specializing in Emergency Medicine and former manager of a medical center established to treat Indian Hajj pilgrims, details issues with both the design of the Mina tent city and quick access to disaster medical care at the site. Ajmal discussed structural design flaws in Mina, calling it a "badly designed death trap—in times of disaster" as it attempts to funnel tens of thousands of people through T intersections, such as the junction of Streets 204 and 223 where the crush occurred. Compression asphyxia is the cause of death for most victims of a crowd collapse, and can occur within ten minutes; Ajmal notes that Mina's design prevents medical care from arriving within that time stating that people at crush sites are "destined to die" within minutes, before any medical help can reach the site.

== Reactions ==
=== Governments ===
After the Mina disaster, many of the world's politicians sent messages of sympathy and consolation, including German Chancellor Angela Merkel, Qatari Prime Minister Abdullah bin Nasser bin Khalifa Al Thani, King Mohammed VI of Morocco, Kuwaiti Emir Sabah Al-Ahmad Al-Jaber Al-Sabah, Pakistani President Mamnoon Hussain, and Tunisian President Beji Caid Essebsi.

Algeria

- Minister of Religious Affairs and Endowments, Mohamed Aissa, said "We do not doubt the reliability of the security system set up by the Saudi government. We do not deny, either, that the Saudi kingdom is the sole organizer of the Hajj, for several years. However, we will require that the whole matter be clarified and that those responsible for this disaster are known and sanctioned. We will demand compensation for the families of the deceased and for the injured".

Bangladesh

- Religious Affairs Secretary Chowdhury Md Babul Hassan criticized the Saudi government for its "disrespectful handling" of the bodies after 24 September incident at Mina. "The way the Saudi security officials removed the bodies from the site seemed as if they were dumping garbage. The stampede has laid bare the Saudi authorities' mismanagements," he said.

India

- Indian President Pranab Mukherjee stated via Twitter that he was "deeply saddened by tragic incident at Mina Thursday, during which a large number of hajj pilgrims lost their lives" and that he offered "my sincere condolences to government of Saudi Arabia and families of the deceased pilgrims. I also wish speedy recovery to injured".
- Indian Prime Minister Narendra Modi, also on Twitter, said, "Distressing news from Mecca. Pained at loss of lives due to the stampede. Condolences to families of the deceased and prayers with the injured."

Indonesia

- Indonesian officials criticized Saudi Arabia's response to the disaster, saying authorities in the kingdom prevented their diplomats from seeing initial data and blocked their immediate access to the dead.
- Indonesia officially offered assistance to help Saudi Arabia in identifying bodies of hundreds of hajj pilgrims killed in Thursday's stampede during the conduction of a hajj procession in Mina, a statement released by Indonesian Foreign Affairs Ministry.

Iran

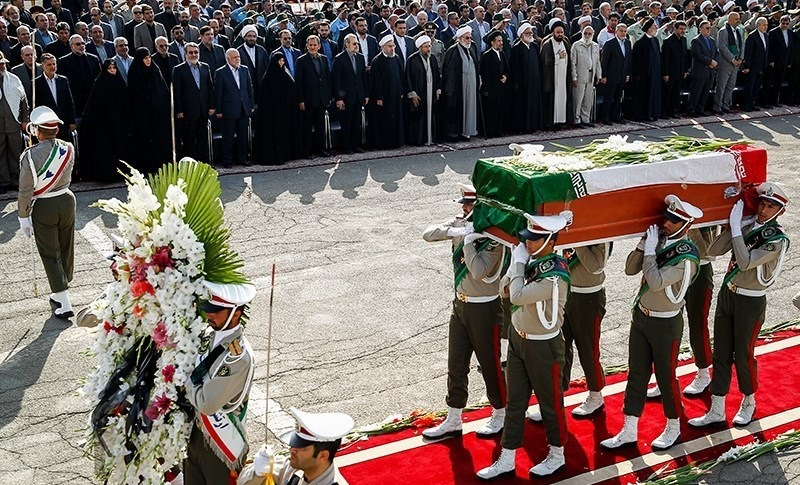
Return of deceased bodies to Mehrabad Airport, with Iranian officials in attendance, 3 October 2015.

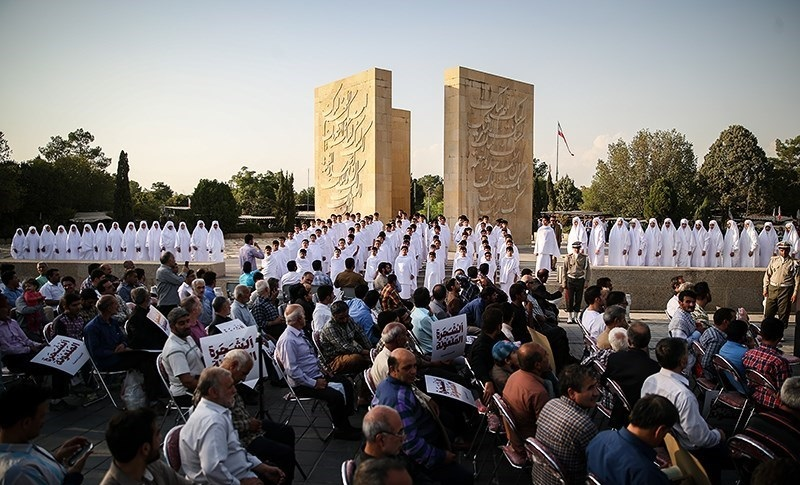
Anniversary of the event at the Behesht-e Zahra cemetery, where 1987 Mecca incident victims are also buried.

- Ayatollah Ali Khamenei, the Supreme Leader of the Islamic Republic of Iran, declared three days of national mourning in Iran. "The Saudi government is obligated to shoulder its heavy responsibility in this bitter incident and meet its obligations in compliance with the rule of righteousness and fairness. Mismanagement and improper measures that were behind this tragedy should not be overlooked," Khamenei said. He threatened Saudi Arabia with a "tough and harsh" response after complaining that "the bodies of Hajj stampede victims are not being repatriated swiftly". Ali Khamenei also demanded that all Islamic countries challenge the management of Mecca and Medina.
- Hassan Rouhani, the President of Iran, in his address to the seventieth UN General Assembly said the feelings of millions of Muslims being hurt by the incident amounts to spiritual loss which cannot be compensated for simply by material means. "The public opinion demands that Saudi authorities discharge, without delay, their international responsibility in providing immediate consular access for the quick identification and returning of the bodies [of the deceased]," said the Iranian president. He further added that "It is also required that the necessary conditions be provided for [conducting] an independent and precise inquiry into the causes of the [Mina] disaster and [working out] methods for preventing a repeat of that in the future."
- The Iranian Foreign Ministry summoned Saudi Arabia’s chargé d'affaires, and dispatched a high-ranking delegation from the Foreign Ministry and the Iranian Red Crescent, headed by Hassan Ghashghavi, to investigate the situation. Hossein Amirabdollahian, Deputy of Foreign Affairs Minister, accused Saudi officials of tactlessness over the lack of safety measures at the Hajj and said "We can in no way be indifferent to this irresponsible behaviour of Saudi Arabia. This will be dealt with through diplomatic channels."
- The director of Iran's Hajj organisation, Said Ohadi, accused Saudi Arabia of safety errors that caused the accident saying that "Today's incident shows mismanagement and lack of serious attention to the safety of pilgrims. There is no other explanation. The Saudi officials should be held accountable."
- Khamenei’s representative on Hajj affairs, Seyed Ali Ghaziaskar, said: "Saudi officials do not let our medical team and doctors to reach the affected areas and hospitals to help."
- Thousands of people marched in Tehran to protest at Saudi Arabia's management of the hajj pilgrimage. The Iranian demonstrators carried black flags representing the deceased and chanted "death to Al Saud" (مرگ بر آل سعود), the ruling royal family of Saudi Arabia.

Lebanon

- Tammam Salam, Prime Minister of Lebanon, offered his condolences, stating that he "shared the sorrow with the Iranian nation and officials of the Islamic Republic".
- Hassan Nasrallah, the Secretary General of Hezbollah said that the Saudi regime has the sole responsibility for the Mina incident as it was the sole manager of the pilgrimage and it has always refused to share this responsibility with anyone else. He stressed that blaming the pilgrims for this tragedy was a simplification of things, and that the consequent accidents in the pilgrimage that occur every year indicate that there is a major problem in Saudi’s management. He further said Saudi Arabia should allow Muslim countries to help the kingdom run the Hajj pilgrimage rituals, emphasising the need for the formation of a Muslim committee to "supervise the management" of the annual Islamic event. He also added that a group of Muslim countries should be formed to investigate the fatal stampede during Hajj rites.

Nigeria

- The Nigerian government has dismissed remarks by the Saudi health minister blaming pilgrims for "not following instructions."
- Abdullahi Mukhtar, the Chairman of National Hajj Commission of Nigeria said, "It was not fair for anyone to blame Africans participating at the pilgrimage for the fatal incident" and called on the Saudi authority to include Nigeria in a government investigation into the incident.
- Nigeria's Emir of Kano, Alhaji Muhammad Sanusi II said he would advise Nigerians not to participate in the Stoning of the Devil unless they are assigned quarters close to the Jamarāt pillars. Citing Qur'anic verses and teachings of Muhammad, Sanusi stated that omitting the Stoning of the Devil rite does not lessen the validity of the Hajj pilgrimage and that "During the era of Prophet Muhammad, he permitted pilgrims who came on camels to stay in Makkah after Arafat, instead of staying in Mina and sleeping at Muzdalifa. So, if the Prophet can give such grace to some people, just to protect their animals, why didn’t our scholars educate our people properly to avoid this untoward hardship and death" and that "If one deliberately refuses to even perform the stoning of the devil ritual, all he needs to do is just to slaughter a ram in order to make up for the loss. So, if this is the situation, why do we go and suffer and die instead of sacrificing a ram?"
- Members of the Nigerian House of Representatives condemned the stampede in Mecca during which several lives were lost. The House also demanded the immediate take-over of the investigation of the incident by international investigators since there were still conflicting reports as to the cause of the incident. It stated that this was necessary in order to prevent future occurrences. During the tragedy, 54 Nigerians lost their lives. One member of the House, Honourable Igbokwue, stated that if nothing definite was done to establish the cause of the stampede, it would definitely happen again.
- The Sultan of Sokoto, Alhaji Sa’ad Abubakar III, urged Saudi authorities to provide henceforth improved safety measures during the annual pilgrimage to Mecca.
- Sani Yahaya Jingir, chairman of Nigeria's National Ulama'u Council, requested the Nigerian government work with Saudi Arabia to investigate the cause of the incident, and to take action to prevent similar future crowd collapses.

Pakistan

- The New York Times reported that, amid public criticism of the Saudi and Pakistani governments for weaknesses in the official response to the tragedy, the Pakistani government has directed private television networks to "avoid criticizing the Saudis in news programs and talk shows." Pakistani lawmaker Tariq Fazal Chaudhry has defended his government's policy, saying the directive was meant to prevent broadcasts from "giving the tragedy a sectarian color."
- The Pakistani opposition walked out of the Senate in protest of the government’s attitude towards the stampede. Senator Aitzaz Ahsan said that the ruling Pakistan Muslim League (N) party "is trying to forget the issue by suppressing it", and that the government "left Pakistani pilgrims alone in tough times and is trying to cover the situation though Pakistan Electronic Media Regulatory Authority (PEMRA)". The Deputy Chairman said that the country should wait for an investigative report from Saudi Arabia, and that "there must not be any politics" concerning the stampede.

Russia

- During a one-on-one meeting at the UN General Assembly, Russian President Vladimir Putin personally expressed his condolences to Iranian President Hassan Rouhani and to the families of Iran's deceased Hajj pilgrims. Putin had earlier sent condolences to Saudi King Salman expressing his "compassion to the families and relatives of the dead and wished an early recovery to the injured".

Saudi Arabia

- Saudi Arabia's Foreign Minister Adel al-Jubeir has accused Iran of "playing politics" with the disaster and stated the Islamic Republic should await the outcome of an investigation ordered by Saudi Arabia's King Salman.
- The governor of the Makkah Region and director of the Central Hajj Committee Prince Khaled al-Faisal blamed the stampede on "some pilgrims from African nationalities". Saudi officials have also blamed pilgrims for the stampede, suggesting some had "moved without following instructions by the relevant authorities". The Saudi health minister Khalid A. Al-Falih stated that the stampede occurred due to pilgrims failing to obey official directions, adding that timetables established by authorities were ignored. However, witnesses dispute this, according to The Guardian.
- King Salman dismissed three high-level officials from their posts after the stampede.
- Saudi Arabia Mufti Abdul-Aziz ibn Abdullah Al ash-Sheikh called the Iranian people and government "non-Muslims and enemies of Islam". He made these comments after Iran's Ayatollah Ali Khamenei said that "the Muslim world should challenge Saudi management" of the sites of Mecca and Medina.

Senegal

- In steering committee, the Senegalese Democratic Party (PDS) demanded the resignation of the government of Dionne Muhammad Abdallah Boun. Liberals believed that the state authorities have not been competent with the "management" of Mina stampede.

Syria

- State-controlled news agency Syrian Arab News Agency stated that the stampede "raised questions about the Saudi government’s attention to pilgrims' safety despite billions of dollars that Saudi authorities claim to spend to improve Hajj."

Turkey

- Mehmet Görmez, the directed of Presidency of Religious Affairs blamed serious management issues at Mecca, saying, "There was serious negligence by authorities in directing the crowd".
- Though AKP Deputy Chair Mehmet Ali Şahin also criticised the Saudi organisation, Turkey's President, Recep Tayyip Erdoğan defended the Saudi government saying, "I do not sympathise with the hostile statements against Saudi Arabia." He asserted, "It is not right to have the approach of putting the blame on Saudi Arabia. On the contrary, during the Hajj and Umrah I participated in, I came to observe closely the level of sensibility in the organization work conducted there. Therefore I cannot say 'the organization is wrong'".

United Kingdom

- United Kingdom Prime Minister David Cameron tweeted that his "thoughts and prayers are with the families of those killed at the Hajj pilgrimage."
- UK opposition Labour Leader Jeremy Corbyn stated that he was "shocked and saddened to hear of today's events in Saudi Arabia. My thoughts are with the friends and families of all those affected as well as Muslims in Britain and around the world."

United Nations

- United Nations Secretary-General Ban Ki-moon stated that he "was deeply saddened to learn of the death of more than 700 Hajj pilgrims and of injuries to many others as a result of a deadly incident in the Mina Valley in the Kingdom of Saudi Arabia".

United States

- Ned Price, spokesman for the United States National Security Council, speaking on behalf of the Obama administration, said "the United States expresses its deepest condolences to the families of the hundreds of Hajj pilgrims killed and hundreds more injured in the heartbreaking stampede in Mina, Kingdom of Saudi Arabia. As Muslims around the world continue to celebrate Eid al-Adha, we join you in mourning the tragic loss of these faithful pilgrims."

Vatican

- Pope Francis, of the Roman Catholic Church, expressed his "sentiments of closeness in the face of the tragedy that [Muslims] suffered today in Mecca."

=== Non-governmental ===
- Grand Mufti Sheikh Abdul-Aziz ibn Abdullah Al ash-Sheikh, Saudi Arabia's chief religious leader (appointed to his position by King Fahd in 1999), told Saudi Arabia's Crown Prince and Minister of the Interior, Muhammad bin Nayef, "You are not responsible for what happened. As for the things that humans cannot control, you are not blamed for them. Fate and destiny are inevitable".
- Irfan al-Alawi, the executive director of the Islamic Heritage Research Foundation, said that "the disaster was a result of poor management by the government, given the number of past disasters."
- Madawi al-Rasheed, a Saudi Arabian anthropologist and visiting professor at the London School of Economics, said: "There is no accountability. It's shocking that almost every year there is some kind of death toll. The renovation and expansion are done under the pretext of creating more space for Muslim pilgrims, but it masks land grabs and vast amounts of money being made by the princes and by other Saudis. Officials in the kingdom had avoided responsibility in part by citing the Islamic doctrine that anyone who dies during the pilgrimage goes to heaven."
- Ali al-Ahmed, a Saudi analyst and current director of the Washington, DC–based Institute for Gulf Affairs think tank blamed the Saudi government's "mismanagement" of the Hajj, saying that "the Ministry of Interior's use of soldiers who have no clue or expertise in managing crowds was the real cause of stampedes. This really has to do with the failure of the Saudi government in organizing this Hajj, and they need to get help from around the world."
- Yasmin Alibhai-Brown, a Ugandan British author and journalist, seized upon the incident to criticize Saudi Arabia for its human rights violations and funding violent Wahhabism in the world. She criticized the Saudi government for blaming the victims in the incident and added "Mecca was once a place of simplicity and spirituality. Today the avaricious Saudis have bulldozed historical sites and turned it into the Las Vegas of Islam – with hotels, skyscrapers and malls to spend, spend, spend. The poor can no longer afford to go there. Numbers should be controlled to ensure safety – but that would be ruinous for profits." She also added that Western leaders are not willing to confront Saudi Arabia because of oil and profits made by arm sales.
- Abbass Schumann, the Undersecretary of Al-Azhar, Egypt, said that allegations of negligence concerning Saudi's administration and managing of the hajj are "unacceptable". Schumann called for patience pending the conclusion of the investigation by Saudi Arabia, and cautioned against rushing to judgment.
- Egyptian physician and feminist writer Nawal El Saadawi said "They talk about changing the way [the hajj] is administered, about making people travel in smaller groups. What they don't say is that the crush happened because these people were fighting to stone the devil. Why do they need to stone the devil? Why do they need to kiss that black stone? But no one will say this. The media will not print it. What is it about, this reluctance to criticise religion? ... This refusal to criticise religion ... is not liberalism. This is censorship".
- Vijay Prashad, Northampton-based journalist and historian, said that survivors told journalists that Saudi's response to the tragedy was "too little, too late," stressing that Saudi rescuers arrived almost two hours after the incident. ... much of Mecca, like Saudi Arabia in general, is designed for the VIP and the VVIP. Embarrassingly, Riyadh provides little if any care to ordinary people and it is not the first time that Saudi Arabia has demonstrated disdain for the lives of Muslims. Instead of pouring money into the war, Riyadh should use its wealth to make the Hajj safe not only for the VIPs, but for millions of ordinary Muslims.
- Citing the rumors about the block, Basma Attasi, a reporter from Al Jazeera who was present in the ritual, explained, "For those who know the area where the stampede occurred, this report seems far from reality. The relatively humble area is far from the entrance to Mina and houses ordinary pilgrims arriving from outside of Saudi Arabia. Important personalities stay in areas close to the entrance and their convoys are assigned separate tunnels and roads to facilitate their movement."
- Moussa Mara, former Premier of Mali, said that "the Divine Will must be evoked after objective analysis, not before. Otherwise no corrective action will be taken and, one day, the same causes will produce the same effects" and called for a thorough investigation and analysis of the Mina crush so as to reduce or eliminate the possibility of such disasters happening again in the future.
- Toby Craig Jones, professor of Middle Eastern history at Rutgers University told The New York Times that he was "not surprised at the Saudi reluctance to give information on what could be a catastrophic case of negligence". Jones stated that the Saudis "want to say it's a technical problem, that order broke down because the victims were unruly. But what if the opposite were true – that the Saudis haven't created a safe environment for the hajj? For the Saudis to be open and honest about what happened would require them to admit it's not a technical problem at all."

== Unconfirmed reports ==
=== Saudi royal convoy ===
Lebanon-based Arabic-language daily Ad-Diyar reported that a convoy escorting Mohammad bin Salman Al Saud, Deputy Crown Prince and Saudi Minister of Defense, composed of 200 soldiers and 150 police officers initiated the disaster by blocking a street forcing pilgrims to turn around against the flow of traffic. The paper also alleged that the deputy crown prince and entourage swiftly left the scene, and that the Saudi authorities sought to impose a media blackout on reporting the Prince's presence in the area.

Iranian media reported the Ad-Diyar story, and Iranian Hajj officials stated that two streets near the disaster point had been sealed for "unknown reasons", while the Iranian Fars News Agency, quoted a member of the Iraqi parliament, Hassan Salem, as saying "the Mina disaster was an engineered tragedy to kidnap the Iraqi and Iranian officials on the pretext of the Mina incident." A reporter with the BBC's Hausa Service, Yusuf Ibrahim Yakasai, confirmed that at least one road leading to the Jamaraat was blocked. Saudi officials denied the reports, stating diplomatic convoys take place in the south of Mina and in tunnels, while the incident took place in the north.

=== Killing of the injured ===
Iran's Ayatollah Ali Khamenei accused the Saudis of killing injured pilgrims by putting them in containers along with the dead.

== Aftermath ==
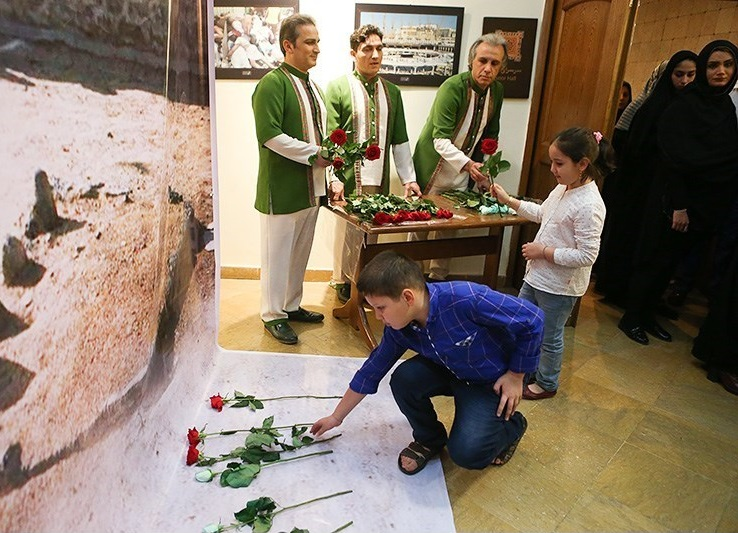
Mina stampede memorial in Tehran

The 2015 Mina Crush disaster has increased tensions in the already-strained relationship between Saudi Arabia and Iran, led to calls from politicians in a number of Muslim nations for changes in oversight of Mecca and the Hajj, and bolstered opposition to King Salman among the senior members of the Saudi Arabian royal family.

=== Criticism of Saudi control of Hajj ===
Politicians and religious leaders in a number of Muslim countries have cited the 2015 Mina Crush disaster as reason for control of the Hajj be given either to a different nation or to a pan-Islamic organization. Mehmet Ali Sahin Deputy Chair of Turkey's Justice and Development Party (AKP) criticised the Saudi organisation, and claimed that Turkey could do a better job than Saudi Arabia at organising the Hajj pilgrimage, calling for Turkey to be entrusted with its management. Nouri al-Maliki, former Prime Minister of Iraq, proposed that the Organisation of Islamic Cooperation (OIC) should take over administration of the Hajj. Mohammad Emami Kashani, an Iranian Ayatollah, also demanded transfer of the control of the Hajj to the OIC, stating "Saudi Arabia is incapable of organising the pilgrimage. The running of the Hajj must be handed over to Islamic states." Hassan Nasrallah, Secretary General of Hezbollah stated that Saudi Arabia should allow Muslim countries to help the kingdom run the Hajj pilgrimage rituals, emphasising the need for the formation of a Muslim committee to "supervise the management" of the annual Islamic event. The Saudi government rejected such calls; Saudi Prince Turki al-Faisal stated Saudi control over the Hajj was "a matter of sovereignty and privilege and service".

In 2016, supreme leader of Iran, Ayatollah Ali Khamenei sent a global message via his website severely criticizing Saudi rulers for what he called "the crimes they have caused throughout the world of Islam," and asked they be held responsible. In his message Khamenei described the nature of Saudi rulers as "blasphemous, faithless, dependent and materialistic," and asked "the world of Islam" to know them. He demanded reconsidering the management of two holy places and the issue of hajj due to what he described as "Saudi rulers' oppressive behavior towards God's guests," referring to 2015 Mina disaster. "Otherwise Muslims would face biggest problems," he warned. "The hesitation and failure to rescue the half-dead and injured people... is also obvious and incontrovertible. ... They murdered them," he said.

=== Increased Saudi–Iranian tensions ===
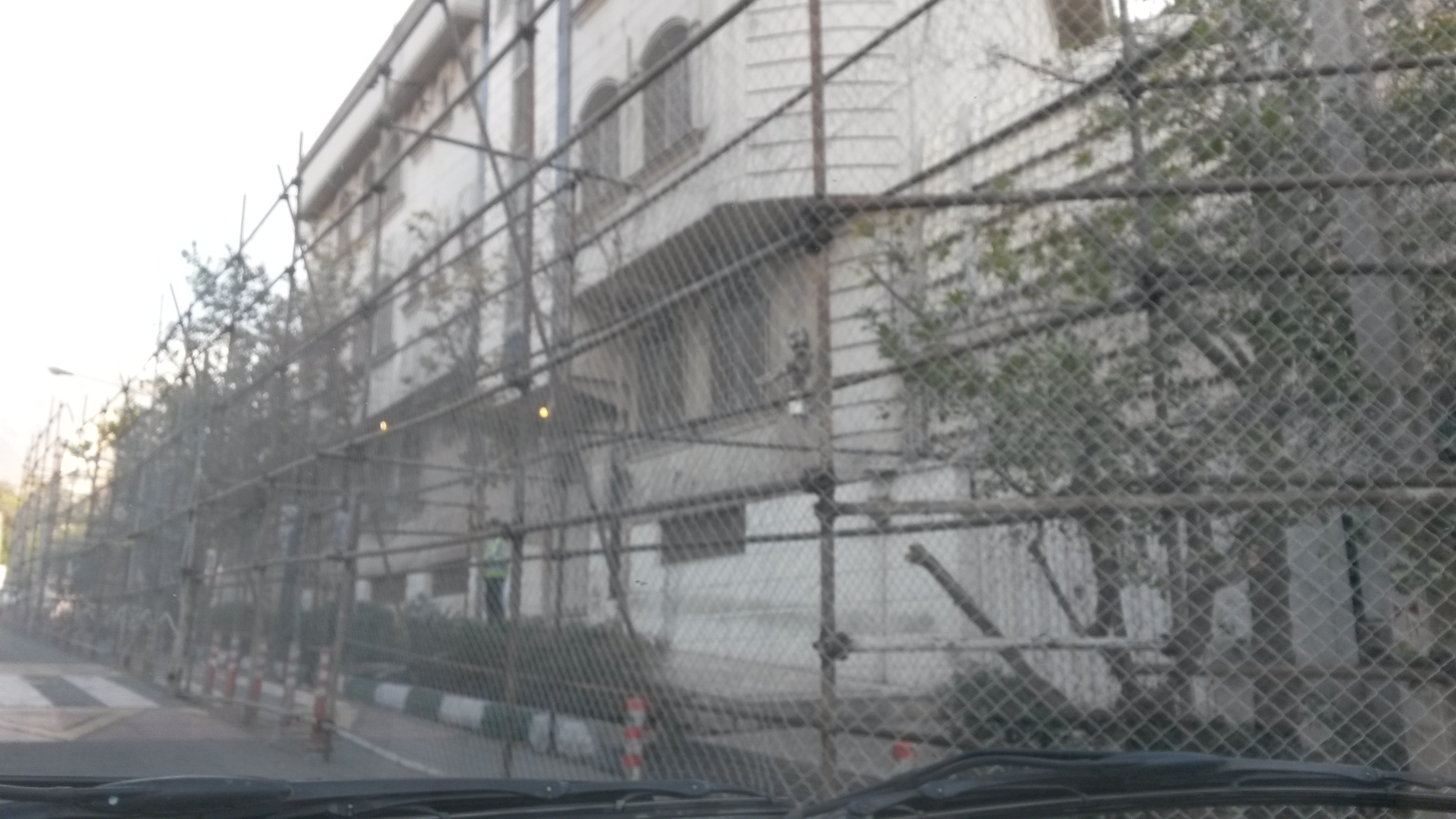
Embassy of Saudi Arabia in Tehran under Iranian police protection after crisis.

Government and religious leaders of Iran—which lost at least 464 citizens in the Mina disaster—have been harshly critical of Saudi Arabia. Saudi leaders have in turn have claimed that Iran is attempting to take advantage of a tragedy for political purposes.

Soon after the Mina Crush, both Iran's Supreme Leader, Ali Khamenei, and Iranian President, Hassan Rouhani, had harsh words for the Saudi government and blamed Saudi Arabia for the disaster. Rouhani suggested that the Mina crush could be the result of the Saudi government moving their best troops to Yemen, and leaving Hajj crowd control to less experienced soldiers. While Ebrahim Raisi, Iran's then State Prosecutor claimed the disaster had been caused by the Saudi officials blocking a road so as to clear a path for a Saudi convoy, and that the House of Saud should be held responsible by international law. Iranian legal experts later decided that Iran could not bring such a case before the International Court of Justice or the International Criminal Court due to jurisdictional issues. Iranian officials also accused Saudi Arabia with kidnapping Iranian diplomat, Ghazanfar Roknabadi, who became missing during the Hajj, until his body was finally identified on 25 November 2015. On 24 November 2015, Iran announced that it was forming its own fact-finding committee to investigate the disaster. Iran claims that the death toll of the disaster greatly exceeds what has been reported, and that between 4,700 and 7,500 pilgrims actually died. On 4 January 2016, Iranian government spokesman Mohammad Bagher Nobakht stated that Iran would be suspending participation by its nationals in the Umrah pilgrimage to Mecca, as "conditions of safety will not be guaranteed to pilgrims".

Saudi Foreign Minister Adel Al-Jubeir has urged Iran to wait for the results of the official Saudi investigation, stating that the Saudi government, "will reveal the facts when they emerge. And we will not hold anything back. If mistakes were made, who made them will be held accountable." Saudi government officials have made few official comments addressing specific Iranian allegations, while attempting to de-escalate tensions with Iran. However, Mohammed bin Nawaf bin Abdulaziz, Saudi Ambassador to the UK, did specifically deny what he called "unfounded allegations", including accusations that a road blockage by a Saudi royal convoy caused the disaster. Additionally, an anonymous Saudi official involved with management of the Hajj suggested to a reporter for Al-Monitor that Mina disaster might be the result of Iranian sabotage, and that the Iranian Hajj Mission was being investigated.

Amid deteriorating diplomatic relations and after months of negotiations concerning visa requirements and safety logistics, in May 2016 Iran suspended participation with the upcoming Hajj scheduled for September 2016. Iran previously suspended participation with the Hajj of 1988 and 1989, after 400 Iranian pilgrims were killed by Saudi security forces. On 18 May 2025, after a decade Saudi Arabia resumed Hajj flight from Iran into the kingdom.

=== Opposition to Saudi King Salman ===
The Mina disaster came at a time of increasing instability among the Saudi royal family. The Guardian reported that a "senior Saudi prince [had] launched an unprecedented call for change in the country's leadership," having written two letters earlier in September, 2015 calling for the king's replacement. The prince was quoted by the Guardian as saying "The public are also pushing this very hard, all kinds of people, tribal leaders [...] They say you have to do this or the country will go to disaster." Reports at the time suggested Prince Ahmed bin Abdulaziz, a younger brother of King Salman, was favored to replace his brother as king.

No coup materialized, and the authenticity of the prince's letters has been questioned. However, structural economic problems, the Yemen War, and discord in the royal family continued to contribute to instability for Saudi Arabia and King Salman. As the holder of the royal title "Custodian of the Two Holy Mosques", King Salman's diligence in performing that role was brought into question following the twin disasters that bracketed the 2015 Hajj season—the Mecca crane collapse and the Mina Crush.

== Description as "stampede" ==
Some academics who study crowd movements and crushing disasters have questioned the use of the term "stampede". "The rhetoric of 'stampede' is often used to imply that the crowd is animalistic or mindless, but from a crowd psychology point of view, I'm sure that there was a logical explanation for the crush", University of Sussex crowd behavioral expert Anne Templeton told Newsweek. "The density of the Hajj has been shown to reach up to 6–8 people per square meter, so I would be very surprised if a stampede (implying people running mindlessly) could occur in the first place".

The academics argue that the Mina disaster is better described as a "progressive crowd collapse": beginning at densities of about six to seven persons per square meter, individuals are pressed so closely against each other they are unable to move as individuals, and shockwaves can travel through a crowd which, at such densities, behaves somewhat like a fluid. If a single person falls, or other people reach down to help, waves of bodies can be involuntarily precipitated forward into the open space. One such shockwave can create other openings in the crowd nearby, precipitating further crushing. Unable to draw breath, people in a crowd can also be crushed while standing.

Use of the word "stampede", says Edwin Galea of the University of Greenwich, is the result of "pure ignorance and laziness ... it gives the impression that it was a mindless crowd only caring about themselves, and they were prepared to crush people." In reality, "people are only directly crushed by others who have no choice, and the people who can choose ... are too far away from the epicentre" to be aware of what is happening. According to experts, true "stampedes" (and "panics") rarely occur except when a crowd is fleeing in fear, such as from a fire, and rarely does trampling by other human beings in such "stampede" conditions result in fatal injuries.

"If you look at the analysis, I’ve not seen any instances of the cause of mass fatalities being a stampede," says Keith Still, professor of crowd science at Manchester Metropolitan University. "People don't die because they panic. They panic because they are dying."

== See also ==
- 2015 Mecca crane collapse
- 1987 Mecca incident
- Incidents during the Hajj
- List of fatal crowd crushes
