= 1998 Hajj stampede =

1998 crowd crush in Mina, Mecca Province, Saudi Arabia

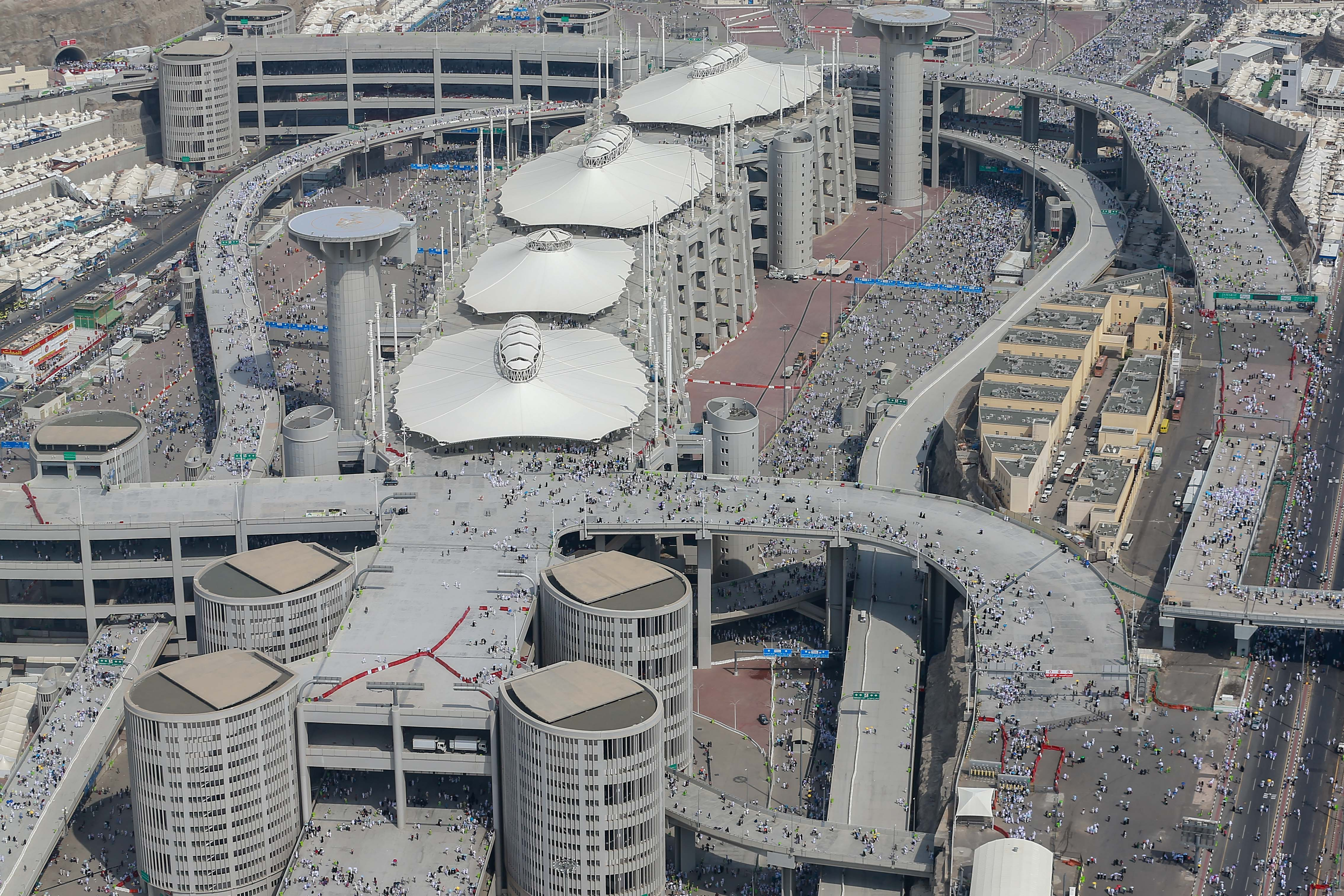
- Aerial view of the Jamaraat Bridge, the site of the incident, in 2017

- Location within Saudi Arabia
- Date: 9 April 1998
- Location: Mina, Mecca Province, Saudi Arabia; 21°25′17″N 39°52′22″E
- Type: Crowd crush
- Cause: Overcrowding during the Stoning of the Devil ritual during the annual Hajj pilgrimage
- Deaths: 118–180
- Injuries: 180–200

On 9 April 1998, a fatal crowd crush resulted in the death of 118 or more people in the valley of Mina, Mecca Province, Saudi Arabia, during the annual Hajj pilgrimage. The crush occurred on the Jamaraat Bridge in Mina as pilgrims waited to partake in the Stoning of the Devil ritual. As pilgrims surged forward, many were trapped on the bridge, resulting in some pilgrims being crushed underfoot while others fell off the bridge.

Estimates of the total death count vary between 118 and 180, while estimates of additional injuries range from 180 to 200. The incident is among a greater number of fatal incidents during the Hajj and is among the deadliest Hajj disasters and the deadliest crowd crushes of all time. Deliberations on safety measures to reduce the recurrence of incidents such as this one were held by the Saudi government after the incident. Among proposed changes were expanding the Jamaraat Bridge, staggering the entrance of individuals onto the bridge, promoting safe practices to pilgrims prior to the Hajj, and issuing a fatwa which would allow the stone-throwing ritual to start earlier in the day.

Although the Saudi government invested in safety measures and greater controlled the flow of pilgrims onto the bridge following the incident, a similar crush would occur in 2001, resulting in the death of 35 people.

== Background ==
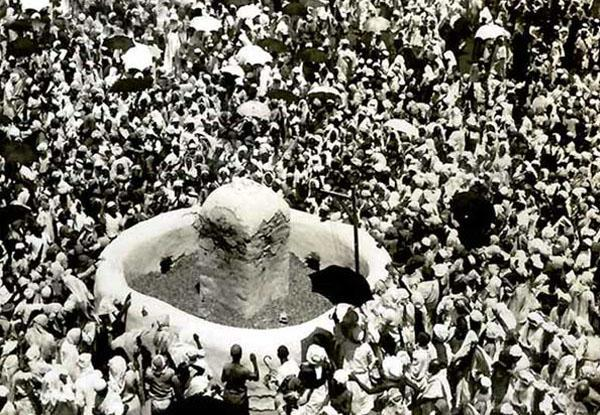
Crowds partake in the "Stoning of the Devil" ritual in 1942

Hajj is the annual Islamic pilgrimage to the city of Mecca, Saudi Arabia, the holiest city in the religion of Islam. Required as part of the Five Pillars of Islam, the Hajj is a one-time religious duty required for all Muslims who have the physical and financial means of undertaking the journey. Multiple millions of visitors make the trip every year, putting stress on the infrastructure of the city during the five-day period of Hajj. Prior to World War II, pilgrims primarily traveled to Mecca by way of caravan, and as few as 10,000 made the annual trek. With the advent of planes and buses, however, along with rising wealth in the Islamic world, crowd sizes ballooned to millions, causing Saudi Arabia to enact a quota system on the number of pilgrims to make the Hajj beginning in 1987 in an effort to combat overcrowding.

The Hajj is a physically demanding pilgrimage, with a risk of injury attached to each rite. One particularly dangerous ritual is the "Stoning of the Devil," in which pilgrims hurl pebbles at three stone columns which represent the temptations of Satan. Researchers Abdul Rashid Gatrad and Aziz Sheikh noted the ritual as prone for causing major injuries as a result of crowd crushes, suggesting that pilgrims should avoid peak times and that older or infirm pilgrims should consider appointing a proxy for the event to avoid injury.

Incidents during the Hajj occurred somewhat frequently during the years leading up to 1998. During the 1990 Mecca tunnel tragedy, 1,426 pilgrims were reported to have died in a crowd crush which occurred in a passenger tunnel. The incident was the deadliest Hajj incident at the time. In 1994, a crowd crush occurred on the Jamaraat Bridge as pilgrims partook in the Stoning of the Devil, with 270 reported dead. After the crush, Saudi officials doubled the width of the 0.6 kilometres (0.37 mi)-mile long bridge, to 280 feet (85 m). Additional measures to prevent crushes during the ritual included the construction of two additional overpasses and allotting each nationality its own turn to throw stones. During the Mecca fire of 1997, a year prior to this incident, the tent neighborhood of Mina, Mecca Province, Saudi Arabia, caught on fire and was picked up by strong winds, resulting in the death of more than 340 pilgrims and injuries to more than 1,500.

2.3 million Muslims from over 100 countries were estimated to have partaken in the 1998 Hajj. Prior to the final day of the Hajj, Saudi officials had praised the smooth operation of the Hajj, which had gone on largely without incident.

== Event ==
On 9 April 1998, the last day of the pilgrimage, a large crowd assembled on and around the Jamaraat Bridge in Mina prior to midday, awaiting to partake in the ritual Stoning of the Devil. As Islamic tradition prohibits the throwing of pebbles prior to midday, tens of thousands of pilgrims waited in the heat to throw stones at the pillars. One eyewitness claimed the number of pilgrims waiting was as high as 600,000. As the heat topped 100 °F (38 °C), helicopter crews were deployed to spot fainting pilgrims and workers with trucks delivered chilled water.

Soon after midday passed, crowds surged forward. Some pilgrims were sat down on an elevated walkway to rest amidst the heat, and were caught up from behind by pilgrims who were told to move forward. Others fell 17 feet to their deaths after being knocked off from the bridge. BBC News also claimed that a parapet on the bridge had collapsed, allowing pilgrims to fall from height, and that the surge was started when Indonesian and Malaysian pilgrims were allowed onto the bridge. Saudi officials claimed that many Asian Muslims did not believe in a symbolic throw and rushed towards the front in order for their stones to actually hit the pillars. Police attempted to rescue pilgrims during the incident, but the crowd surges prevented them from getting near the victims. Policemen used loudspeakers to plead in Arabic, English, French, and Urdu for pilgrims to move quickly, while other policemen used batons to make room for pilgrims fleeing from the crowd. Eyewitnesses attested that many pilgrims did not follow the instructions given by officials, and that the screams during the incident were "deafening." Mecca police officials praised the actions of the security forces, claiming that thousands of pilgrims would have died had they not intervened. The incident occurred in the same area as the 1994 crush.

Early estimates of the number of fatalities varied, with the Saudi Press Agency (SPA) reporting 107 deaths while Saudi officials reported more than 150. At least 30 additional pilgrims were reported to have sustained injuries during the crush. Most of the victims were initially reported to be elderly men and women from Indonesia and Malaysia, with other victims coming from Egypt, India, and Pakistan. The SPA claimed the day after the incident that 11 more pilgrims died from their injuries in the hospital, bringing the total dead to 118. This figure has remained the official death toll from the SPA, though doctors claimed that about 180 pilgrims died during the incident. Of the victims identified on 10 April, 24 were from India, seven were from Algeria—including five women from Béchar Province, six were from Pakistan, three from Morocco, and two from Indonesia. By 12 April, 64 of the victims had been identified, with countries of origin including Algeria, Bangladesh, Egypt, India, Indonesia, Kuwait, Morocco, Pakistan, Syria, and Turkey.

Weeks later, a Houston Chronicle piece estimated around 200 total pilgrims were injured in addition to the 118 casualties. In subsequent reporting, the death count has varied between 118 and 180, (Note: The Sydney Morning Herald, the Australian Broadcasting Corporation, and BBC News have listed 118 deaths, Thomson Reuters listed 119 deaths, while The Hindu listed 180.) while the number of injured has stayed at 180.

== Aftermath ==
On 12 April 1998, Saudi officials formed a committee to look into ways to prevent a recurrence of the incident. The committee studied ways to ease congestion at certain pilgrimage sites. An official said that the committee was looking into expanding the Jamaraat Bridge and only allowing individuals on the bridge every 20 minutes. The committee also looked into starting campaigns to explain to pilgrims prior to the Hajj what actions and areas should be avoided. On 13 April, Sheikh Abdullah Al-Sheikh announced that members of Saudi clergy were looking into issuing a fatwa that would permit the ritual to start at dawn rather than at mid-day. In subsequent days, King Fahd called on other countries to educate their Muslim citizens of the Hajj rituals in order to prevent further incidents.

During the Hindu pilgrimage of Kumbh Mela days later, India deployed several police officers to maintain order and prohibiting large groups to bathe at once in the Ganges. For both measures, the Hajj crush was cited as a motivating factor.

Following the incident, the government of Saudi Arabia spent hundreds of millions of dollars on safety precautions during the Hajj, including the introduction of means to stagger the flow of pilgrims through congested areas. Despite the upgrades, 35 pilgrims died as a result of a crush in 2001. The crush occurred in the same location and during the same ritual as the 1998 incident.

== See also ==
- Incidents during the Hajj
- List of fatal crowd crushes
