= 1994 Hajj stampede =

Crowd crush in Mecca, Saudi Arabia

- Date: 23 May 1994
- Location: Mina, Mecca, Saudi Arabia
- Deaths: 270
- Injuries: 200+

The 1994 Hajj stampede resulted in the deaths of at least 270 pilgrims on 23 May 1994 during the Hajj in Mecca during the Stoning of the Devil ritual.

== Event ==
Saudi officials said the stampede, which occurred at about 2pm local time, was caused by conditions "beyond human endurance", with a record 2.5 million pilgrims that year. Some victims were reported to have fallen from a pedestrian overpass (the Jamaraat Bridge) as a wave of pilgrims crowded those already on the overpass. After Saudi police sealed off the overpass, the crowds panicked and moved in two directions, causing more people to fall. Ambulances could not reach the scene of the incident fast enough, which likely contributed to the death toll.

A Saudi statement on the incident blamed pilgrims who were rushing to throw their stones as causing the stampede. The Saudis reported that 829 people died during the hajj, including 270 killed in the stampede, 536 who died from natural causes (which included sunstroke), and 23 from isolated incidents. A Saudi official also noted that people get trampled every year.

One Saudi report stated that the victims included 182 Turks, and mostly Lebanese among the remainder. Later reports suggested that most victims were Indonesian.

== Subsequent measures ==
The Jamaraat Bridge (which still had a single tier at that time) was widened from 40 meters to 80 meters after the incident, though another large stampede occurred on the bridge four years later.

== See also ==
- Incidents during the Hajj
- 2015 Mina stampede
