= Incidents during the Hajj =

Accidents during the annual Islamic pilgrimage to Mecca

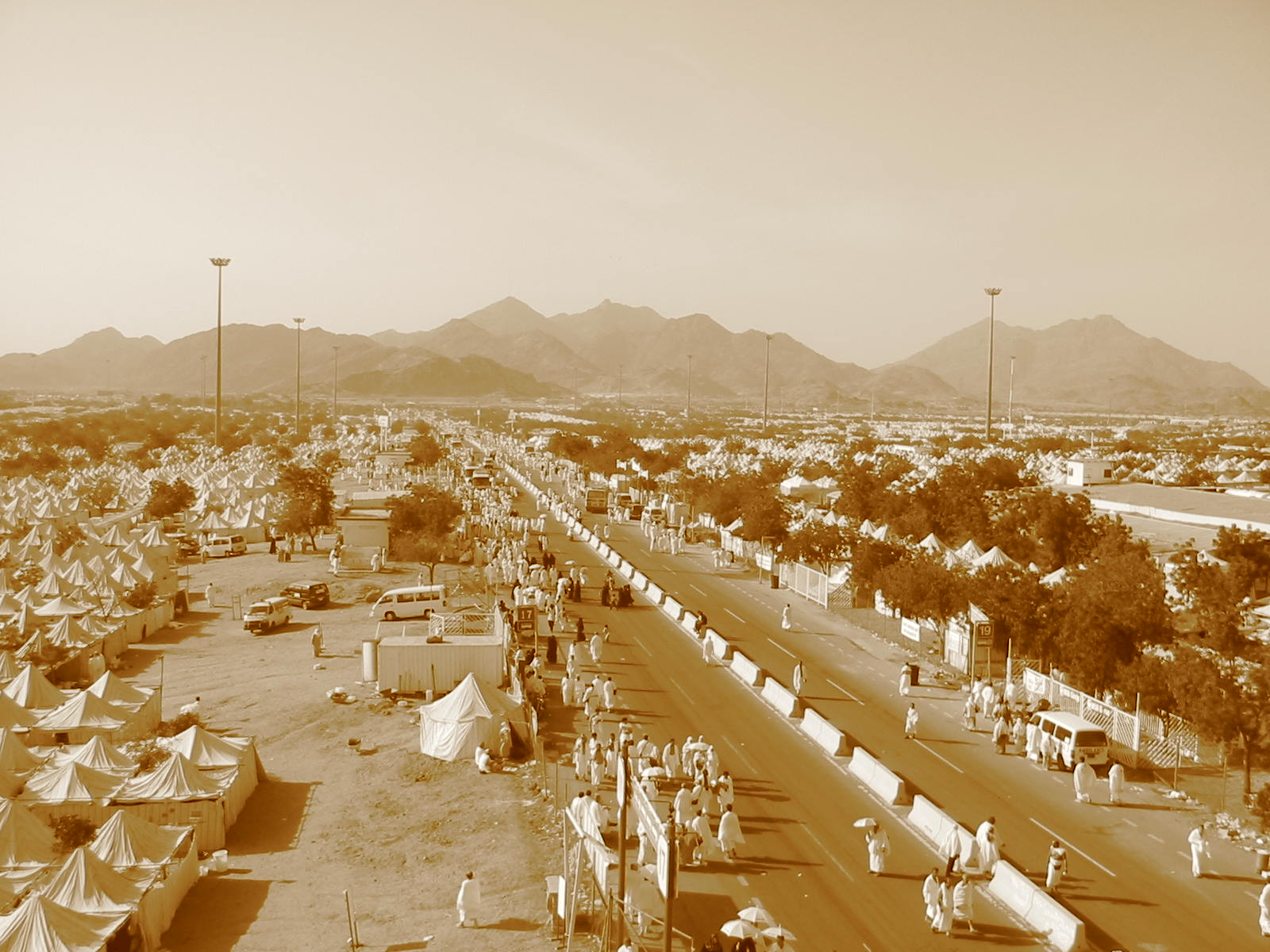
Plains of Arafat on the day of Hajj, c. 2003.

There have been numerous incidents during the Hajj, the Muslim pilgrimage to the cities of Mecca and Medina, that have caused loss of life. Every follower of Islam is required to perform the Hajj in Mecca at least once in their lifetime, if able to do so; the pilgrimage is one of the Five Pillars of Islam. During the month of the Hajj, Mecca must cope with as many as three million pilgrims.

Plane travel makes Mecca and the Hajj more accessible to pilgrims from all over the world. As a consequence, the Hajj has become increasingly crowded. City officials are required to control large crowds and provide food, shelter, sanitation, and emergency services for millions. Despite these efforts, incidents have still occurred.

== Crushes and failures of crowd control ==
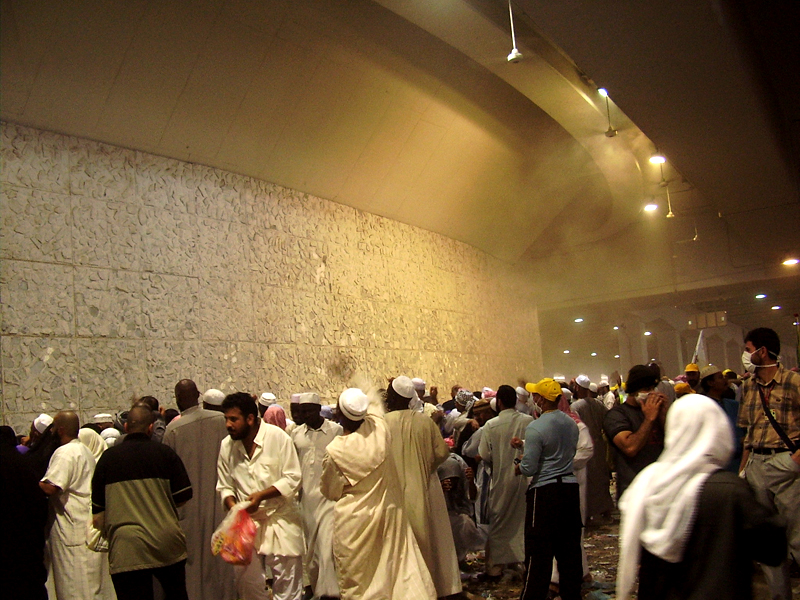
Stoning of the Devil, 2006

The dense, surging crowds, trekking from one station of the pilgrimage to the next, can cause a progressive crowd collapse. At densities above six to seven persons per square meter, individuals cannot move, groups are swept along in waves, individuals jostle to find breath and to avoid falling and being trampled, and hundreds of deaths can occur as a result. The Stoning of the Devil (ramī aj-jamarāt) ceremony is particularly crowded and can be dangerous. Pilgrims ritualistically throw pebbles at three walls (formerly pillars before 2004) which represent the three places where the Hadiths describe how the Devil tempted Abraham. It is one of a series of ritual acts that are performed during the Hajj.

Some notable incidents include:

- 2 July 1990: A stampede or crush inside a pedestrian tunnel (Al-Ma'aisim tunnel) leading out from Mecca towards Mina and the Plains of Arafat led to the deaths of 1,426 pilgrims, many of them of Malaysian, Indonesian and Pakistani origin.
- 23 May 1994: A stampede killed at least 270 pilgrims at the Stoning of the Devil ritual.
- 9 April 1998: At least 118 pilgrims were trampled to death and 180 injured in an incident on Jamaraat Bridge.
- 5 March 2001: 35 pilgrims were trampled to death in a stampede during the Stoning of the Devil ritual.
- 11 February 2003: The Stoning of the Devil ritual claimed 14 pilgrims' lives.
- 1 February 2004: 251 pilgrims were killed and another 244 injured in a stampede during the stoning ritual in Mina.
- 22 January 2005: A stampede through the stoning ritual in Mina led to the killing of three pilgrims
- 12 January 2006: A stampede or crush during the Stoning of the Devil on the last day of the Hajj in Mina killed at least 346 pilgrims and injured at least 289 more. The incident occurred shortly after 13:00 local time, when a busload of travelers arrived together at the eastern access ramps to the Jamaraat Bridge. This caused pilgrims to trip, rapidly resulting in a lethal crowd collapse. An estimated two million people were performing the ritual at the time.
- 24 September 2015: At least 1,470 pilgrims were killed during a crush and stampede. An Associated Press (AP) report compiled from official reports and statements totaled the deaths at at least 2,236, over 700 more than the figures from Saudi authorities, and the worst toll so far in Mecca. The AP later updated its estimate to 2,411 pilgrims killed.

== Fires ==
- December 1975: An exploding gas cylinder caused a fire in a tent colony and resulted in the deaths of 200 pilgrims.
- 15 April 1997: 343 pilgrims were killed and 1,500 injured in a tent fire. The tents are now fireproof.
- 13 February 2002: Forty Hajj pilgrims from the UAE died when the bus they were traveling in collided head-on with a truck in Saudi Arabia's Al Ihsa province.
- 1 November 2011: Two pilgrims, a wife and husband, died in a coach fire. There were two coaches in the convoy, and a person in the second coach noticed smoke billowing from the coach in front. He radioed the driver to stop. Everybody evacuated the coach, and as the last two were getting out, the coach suffered three explosions.

== Protests and violence ==
- 692: The siege of Mecca occurred when Umayyad general Al-Hajjaj ibn Yusuf besieged Mecca on 25 March 692. The city was bombarded using catapults and continued during the Hajj rituals. It resulted in the Kaaba being damaged. It was then rebuilt again.
- 924: The Hajj caravan returning from Mecca to Iraq was attacked and destroyed by the Qarmatians.
- 925: The Hajj caravan setting out from Kufa is stopped by Qarmatian attacks and forced to return to Iraq.
- 930: On the first day of Hajj, Qarmatian leader Abu Tahir al-Jannabi led an attack on Mecca and set about massacring the pilgrims. While killing pilgrims, he taunted them with verses of the Koran as they did so, and verses of poetry: "I am by God, and by God I am ... he creates creation, and I destroy them". About 30,000 pilgrims were killed. The bodies of the pilgrims were left to rot in the streets or were thrown down the Well of Zamzam. The Kaaba was looted, houses were plundered, and slaves seized. He removed the Black Stone and it was in his possession for 21 years.
- 1502: The Mira, a ship carrying Hajj-pilgrims returning from Mecca was set ablaze on the orders of Portuguese explorer Vasco da Gama. Around several hundred pilgrims were killed.
- 1695: On 7 September, pirates led by Henry Every hijacked Grand Mughal vessels which were making the annual pilgrimage to Mecca. The pirates then subjected their captives to several days of horror, raping and murdering prisoners at will, and using torture to force them to reveal treasure. Some of the women committed suicide by jumping into the sea.
- 1757: The 1757 Hajj caravan raid was the plunder and massacre of the Hajj caravan of 1757 on its return to Damascus from Mecca by Bedouin tribesmen. An estimated 20,000 pilgrims were killed as a result of the raid.
- 1926: On 18 June 1926 Egyptian soldiers playing music while escorting the mahmal, were confronted by angry Najdis, who disliked the mahmal as an innovation and considered music un-Islamic. The Egyptians fired on them, killing 25.
- In 1986, a group of Iranian pilgrims were caught with C-4 explosives in their bags. Later investigation sparked theories that the explosives were put there by Iranian authorities.
- 31 July 1987: A clash between Iranian demonstrators and Saudi security forces led to the deaths of more than 400 pilgrims and thousands injured.
- 9 July 1989: Two bombs exploded, killing one pilgrim and wounding another 16. The perpetrators were from Kuwait and most of them were later executed.

== Airplane crashes related to the Hajj ==
- 22 January 1973: A Nigeria Airways Boeing 707-3D3C operated by Royal Jordanian crashed at Kano, Nigeria, killing 176 Hajj pilgrims returning from Mecca.
- 4 December 1974: Martinair Flight 138 crashed near Colombo, Sri Lanka, killing all 191 people aboard – 182 Indonesian hajj pilgrims bound for Mecca, and 9 crew members.
- 15 November 1978: Loftleiðir Flight 001 crashed at Colombo, Sri Lanka, killing 175 (mostly Indonesian) Muslim pilgrims returning from the Hajj and 8 crew members.
- 26 November 1979: Pakistan International Airlines Flight 740 had an in-flight fire and crashed after takeoff from the old Jeddah International Airport on 26 November 1979 killing all 156 on board the Boeing 707.
- 11 July 1991: Nigeria Airways Flight 2120 (operated by Nationair) was a chartered passenger flight from Jeddah, Saudi Arabia, to Sokoto, Nigeria which had an in-flight fire and crashed shortly after takeoff from King Abdulaziz International Airport, killing all 247 Hajj pilgrims and 14 crew members on board the DC-8.
- 7 April 1999: Turkish Airlines Flight 5904 was a flight from Adana, Turkey to Jeddah. The plane was supposed to pick up returning pilgrims but crashed shortly after takeoff. All 6 occupants on board, who were crew members, were killed.

== Disease ==
Mingling of visitors from many countries, some of which have poor health care systems still plagued by preventable infectious diseases, can lead to the spread of epidemics. If an outbreak were to occur on the road to Mecca or Medina, pilgrims could exacerbate the problem when they returned home and passed their infection on to others. This was more of a problem in the past when modern medicine was less advanced. One such disease, which prompted a response from the Saudi government, is meningitis as it became a primary concern after an international outbreak following the Hajj in 1987. Due to post-Hajj outbreaks globally of certain types of meningitis in previous years, it is now a visa requirement to be immunised with the ACW135Y vaccine before arrival. Every year, the Saudi government publishes a list of required vaccines for pilgrims, which for 2010 also included yellow fever, polio, and meningitis.

=== Middle East respiratory syndrome ===
As of 9 September 2013, the Saudi government asked "elderly and chronically ill Muslims to avoid the Hajj this year" and restricted the numbers of people allowed into the country due to Middle East respiratory syndrome coronavirus (MERS-CoV). Although MERS-CoV was not detected among pilgrims, this does not rule out risk of the disease at Hajj. The disease, though, is only mildly contagious.

=== COVID-19 ===
The spread of the COVID-19 prompted the Saudi Arabian government to discourage people from planning for the Hajj in 2020. On 21 April, the Saudis announced that there would be no public attendance at Taraweeh in Mecca or in Medina.

=== Notable disease outbreaks ===
During the 1821 Hajj, about 20,000 Meccan pilgrims died due to a cholera epidemic. The disease had started in India in 1817.

Another cholera epidemic began in 1863. It started in the Ganges Delta of the Bengal region and traveled with Muslim pilgrims to Mecca during the 1865 hajj.

In 1905 the El Tor strain of cholera was discovered in six pilgrims returning from Hajj at the El-Tor quarantine camp in Egypt.

The 1972 Yugoslav smallpox outbreak, the last major smallpox outbreak in Europe, was caused by an Albanian who brought the disease back from Mecca.

In 2009, 73 cases of H1N1, which is also known as swine flu, were recorded at the final days of Hajj. Five pilgrims died due to the virus.

== Construction failures ==
=== 2006 Al Ghaza hotel collapse ===
A concrete multi-story building located in Mecca close to the Grand Mosque collapsed on 5 January 2006. The building, the Al-Ghaza Hotel, is said to have housed a restaurant, a convenience store, and a hotel. The hotel was reported to have been housing pilgrims to the 2006 Hajj. As a result, 76 people died and 62 people were injured.

=== 2015 crane collapse ===
A crane fell in the grand mosque on 11 September 2015, ten days before Hajj, causing 111 deaths and 394 injuries.

== Extreme heat ==
Much of the pilgrimage and its rituals are performed outdoors, on foot, and by elderly people, making pilgrims more susceptible to the intense heat present in Mecca during the summer. Outdoor rituals include standing on the plain of Mount Arafat from sunrise to sunset and walking for several hours in the outskirts of Mecca on other days. Stress due to heat has been exacerbated by increases in regional temperatures induced by climate change, which Saudi researchers stated in a March 2024 study in the Journal of Travel Medicine represented an average rise of dry-bulb temperatures by 0.4 °C (0.7 °F) and wet-bulb temperatures by 0.2 °C (0.4 °F) per decade. Both are strongly correlated with increased heat stroke and heat exhaustion, and Hajj dates that coincided with Mecca's "hot cycle" in May through September, 1982–1995 and 2015–2024, led to greater risk to pilgrims. During the 1982–1995 hot cycle, rates of heat stroke and heat exhaustion peaked at 134.2 and 858.8 per 100,000 pilgrims respectively, both occurring in August 1985 where the average daily wet-bulb temperature during the Hajj was 25.1 °C (77.2 °F). The average daily wet-bulb temperatures during Hajj between 1979 and 2019 exceeded the US National Weather Service danger threshold of 24.6 °C (76.3 °F) on 38 days, nearly half of which took place in 2015–2019. The study also showed that Hajj pilgrims from countries with colder average temperature were 4.5 times more likely to die than local pilgrims.

Attempts to mitigate the heat include portable water stations and misting systems, as well as expansive air conditioning in the floor of the Great Mosque of Mecca and in surrounding tents. This contributed to a 74.6% reduction in heat stroke cases and a 47.6% decrease in fatality rate compared to the prior 1982–1995 hot cycle, but still represented greater rates compared to the prior cold cycle.

In 2023, temperatures reached 48 °C (118 °F), leading to at least 8,400 pilgrims suffering from heat-related illnesses, with the actual number likely being much greater due to the number of unreported cases.

In 2024, temperatures in Mecca reached above 46 °C (115 °F) on 16 June and 52 °C (126 °F) on 17 June. Medical personnel had to treat at least 2,764 pilgrims (among around 1.8 million total) due to heat-related illness on 16 June 2024 alone. Jordan's foreign ministry reported on 16 June that 14 Jordanian pilgrims died after suffering from heat stroke due to the extreme heat, and that 17 more pilgrims were missing. Between 14 and 19 June 2024, at least 1,301 pilgrims had died due to extreme heat in Mecca during the Hajj of 2024, with temperatures exceeding 50 °C (122 °F).

== Other fatal events ==
Of the millions of pilgrims each year, many are elderly and some die of their illnesses, exacerbated in some cases by the heat and exertion (for example, in the 1927 pilgrimage season, at least 1,500 pilgrims died).

- On 25 November 1908, the passenger-cargo ship SS Sardinia caught fire off Malta's Grand Harbour and ran aground, resulting in at least 118 deaths. Most of the casualties were Moroccan pilgrims on their way to Mecca.
- On 21 May 1930 the Fabre Line's SS Asia, having brought 700 Algerian pilgrims to Mecca for the Hajj and then loaded some 1,500 pilgrims, c. 1,200 of them Yemenis returning to Aden and c. 300 from French Somaliland returning to Djibouti, caught fire in Jeddah harbour. At least 112 pilgrims died, possibly many more.
- Before the beginning of the first day of the December 2006 Hajj, 243 pilgrims had died, according to a statement by the Saudi government. The majority of deaths were reportedly related to heart problems, exhaustion in the elderly and people with weak health, caused by the heat and tiring physical work involved in the pilgrimage. After the conclusion of the Hajj, the Nigerian government reported that 33 nationals had died mostly "as a result of hypertension, diabetes and heart attack", not due to epidemic illnesses, and rejected assertions that Nigerian pilgrims died in an accident on a road to Mina. Egypt's official news agency has reported that by 30 December (10 Dhu al-Hijjah), 22 Egyptian pilgrims had died. Four Filipino pilgrims in their 50s died during the pilgrimage of illnesses or other 'natural causes', and were buried in Mecca. The Pakistani Hajj Medical Commission has announced that approximately 130 Pakistani pilgrims died during the Hajj season in Saudi Arabia, "mostly aged and victims of pneumonia and heart patients", and that 66 pilgrims were admitted to Saudi hospitals for similar ailments.
- In early December 2006, a coach bus carrying pilgrims from holy sites in Medina to Mecca crashed 55 miles north of the port of Rabegh near Jeddah, killing 3 Britons and injuring 34 others, including two children.
- In 2009, 77 pilgrims performing Hajj were killed due to floods.
- In November 2011, thirteen Afghans died and a dozen others were wounded as a result of illness and traffic accidents.

== Pickpocketing ==
Since 2010s, there has been an increasing number of pickpocketing cases reported to local authorities. According to the Save Madina Foundation, there were 321 victims of reported pickpocketing during the 2010 Hajj alone.

== Sexual abuse and miscarriages ==
Female pilgrims have spoken up about sexual abuse experienced on the Hajj through a movement called the Mosque Me Too movement. Using the hashtag #MosqueMeToo, which stems from the Me Too movement which used the hashtag #MeToo, Muslim women have shared their experiences online about sexual abuse in Mecca.

Many pregnant pilgrims suffer from miscarriages due to performing the hajj. In 2011, 20 pregnant women performing the pilgrimage had miscarriages due to exhaustion.

== Official responses ==
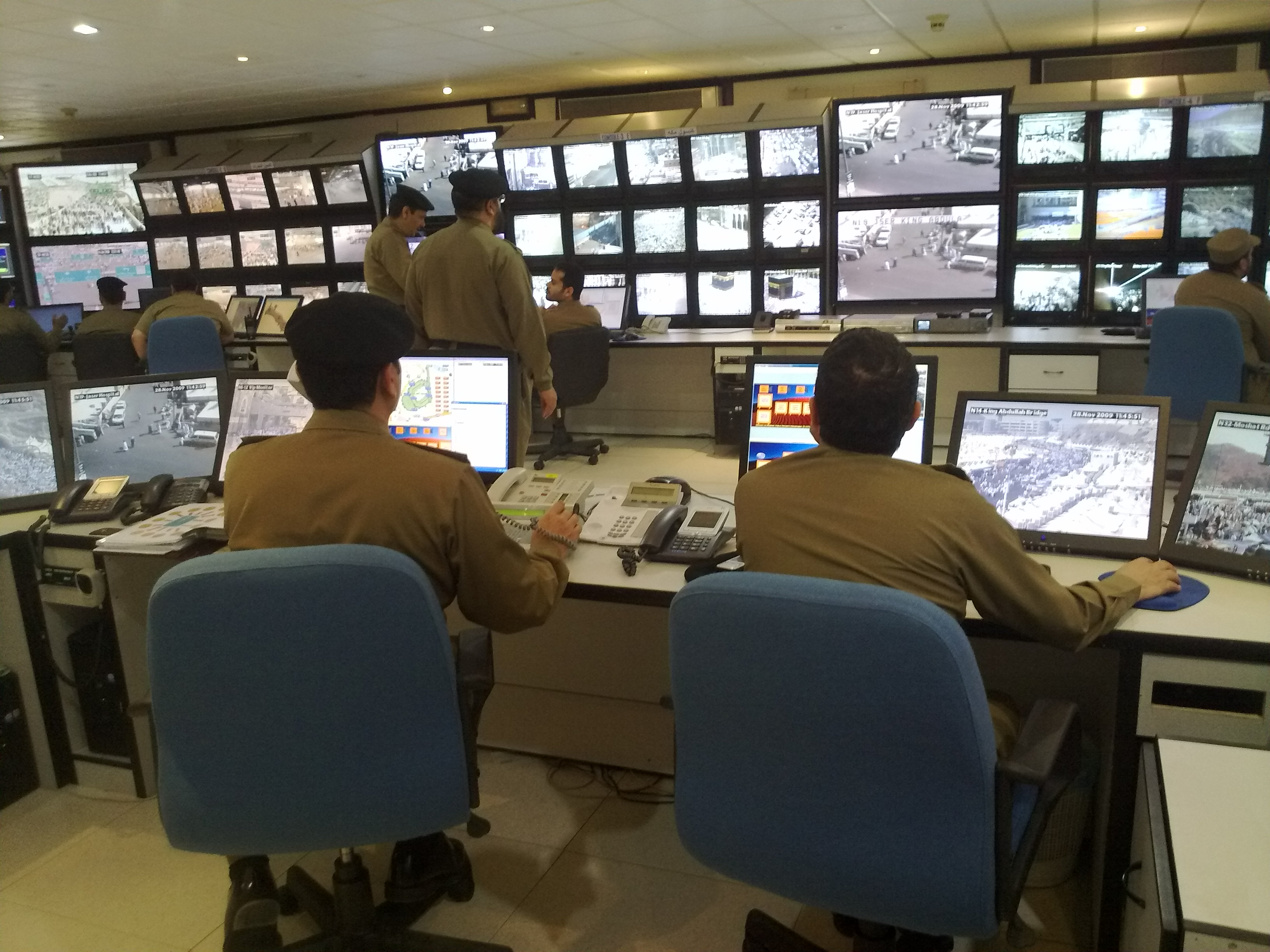
The Saudi government has created a CCTV network to oversee security during the event.

Critics say that the Saudi government should have done more to prevent such tragedies. The Saudi government insists that any such mass gatherings are inherently dangerous and difficult to handle, and that they have taken a number of steps to prevent the problems. The fatalities in the largest tragedy in September 2015 are alleged to have been downplayed by the Saudis by as many as 1,700.

One of the biggest steps, which is also controversial, is a new system of registrations, passports, and travel visas to control the flow of pilgrims. This system is designed to encourage and accommodate first-time visitors to Mecca and Medina, while restricting repeat visits. Pilgrims who have the means and desire to perform the Hajj several times have protested what they see as discrimination, but the Hajj Commission has stated that they see no alternative if further tragedies are to be prevented.

Following the 2004 stampede, Saudi authorities embarked on major construction work in and around the Jamaraat Bridge area. Additional accessways, footbridges, and emergency exits were built, and the three cylindrical pillars were replaced with concrete walls to enable more pilgrims simultaneous access to them without the jostling and fighting for position of recent years. The government has also announced a multimillion-dollar project to expand the bridge to five levels; the project was planned for completion in time for the 1427 AH (December 2006 – January 2007) Hajj. Following the 2006 incident, the Jamaraat Bridge and the pillars representing Satan were demolished and reconstructed. A wider, multi-level bridge was built, and massive columns replaced the pillars themselves. Now, each level of the bridge allows easier and safer access to the columns representing Satan. In addition, the stoning ceremony must be carried out according to pre-determined schedules to prevent over-crowding and the attendant risks. The Jamaraat basin has been expanded from its current circular shape into an oval to allow better access to the pillars. The new arrangements provide for separate access and departure routes. However, a security breakdown is mentioned as cause for the 2015 stampede. A group of pilgrims who had cast their own stones and were returning to their camp, instead of taking the route designated for returning pilgrims, took the route meant for those who were coming and crossed the other group of pilgrims heading straight to the jamaraat.
