= Jamaraat Bridge =

Pedestrian bridge in Mina, Saudi Arabia, used by Muslims during the Hajj

Jamarat Bridge جسر الجمرات
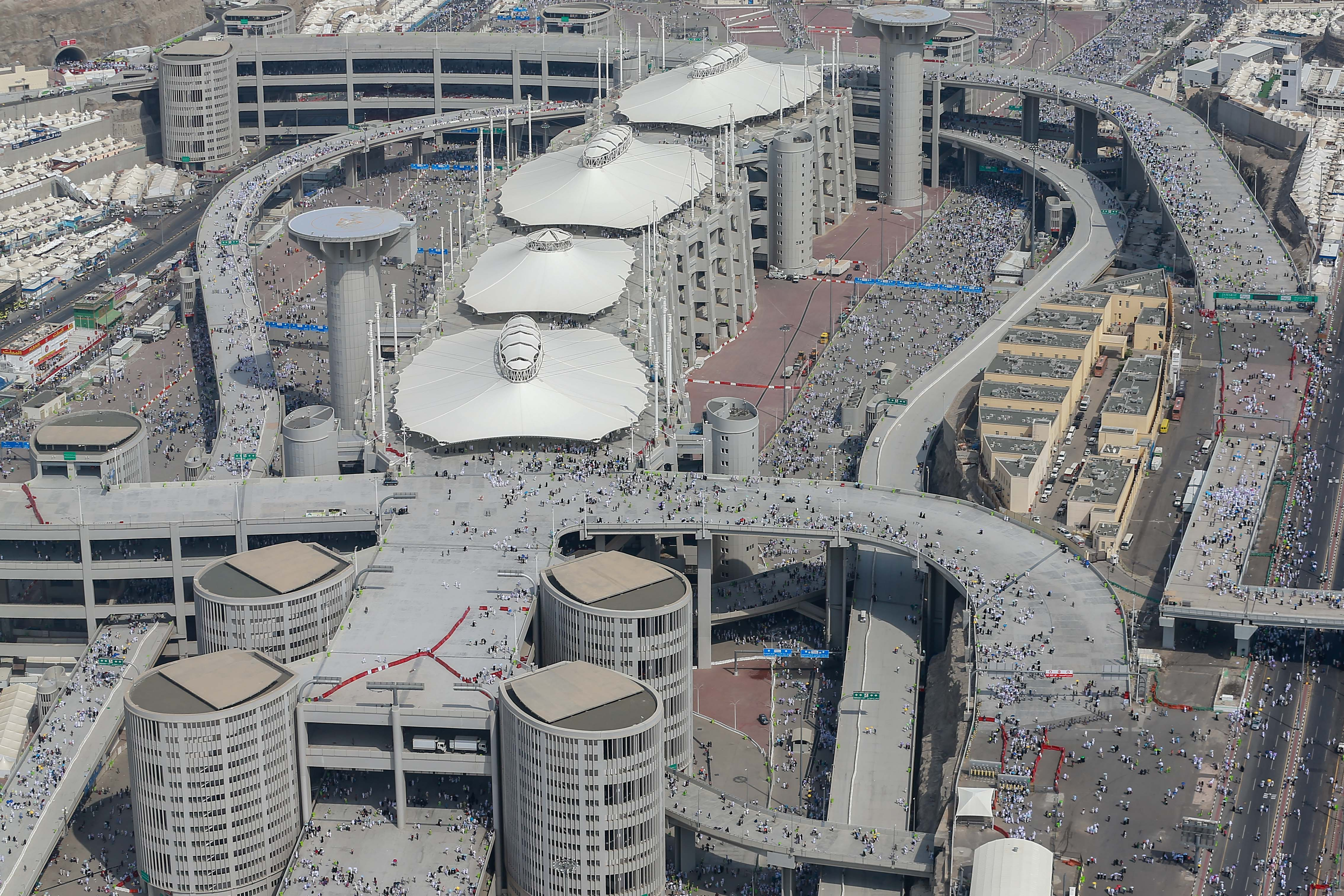
- The new Jamarat Bridge
- Coordinates: 21°25′17″N 39°52′22″E
- Carries: Pedestrians
- Locale: Saudi Arabia

History
- Opened: 1963 (original); 2007 (new bridge)

Location
- Interactive map of Jamarat Bridge جسر الجمرات

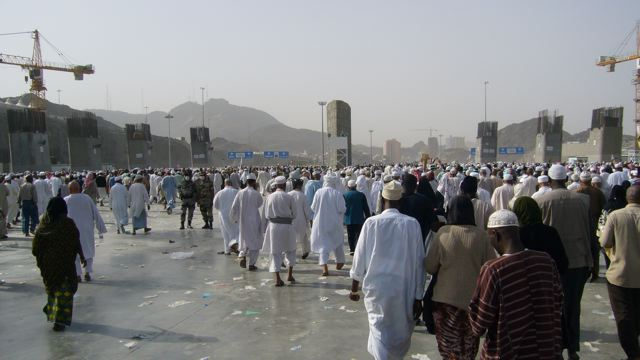
The new partially completed Jamarat Bridge, Hajj 2007

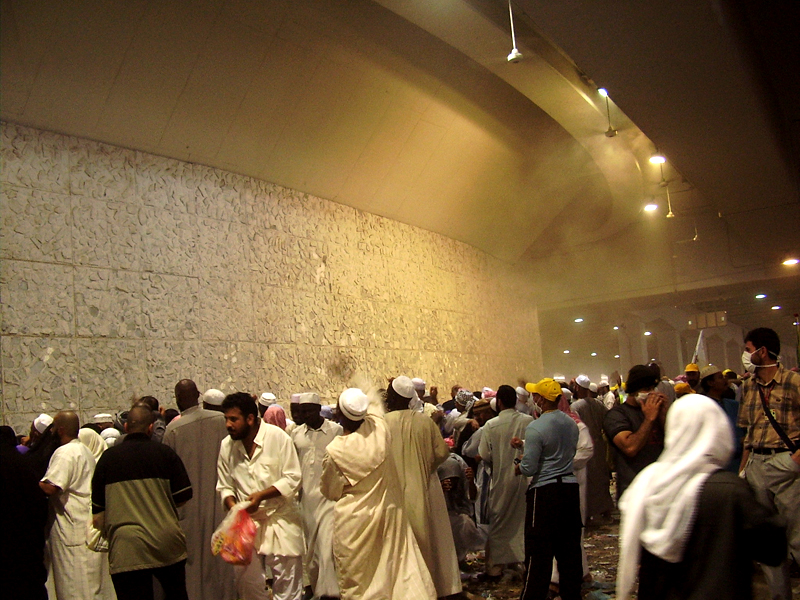
Pilgrims stoning the jamrah in the lower level

The Jamaraat Bridge (Arabic: جسر الجمرات; transliterated: Jisr Al-Jamarat) is a pedestrian bridge in Mina, Saudi Arabia, near Makkah used by Muslims during the Hajj ritual Stoning of the Devil. The purpose of the bridge is to enable pilgrims to throw stones at the three jamrah pillars either from the ground level or from the bridge. Jamaraat is the plural of jamraah, the Arabic term for each of the pillars involved in the stoning ritual. It literally means a small piece of stone or a pebble.

The bridge was built in 1963 and has been expanded several times since then. The pillars extend up through three openings in the bridge. Until 2006, the bridge had a single tier (i.e. a ground level with one bridge level above). At certain times, more than a million people may gather in the area of the bridge, which has sometimes led to fatal accidents.

== New bridge ==
Following the January 2006 Hajj, the old bridge was demolished and construction began on a new multi-level bridge. The ground and first levels were complete in time for the 2006/2007 Hajj, which passed without incident. Construction on the remaining two levels have been completed since December 2007 1428 AH Hajj.

The new bridge (designed by Dar Al-Handasah and constructed by the Saudi Binladin Group) contains a wider column-free interior space and expanded jamrah pillars many times longer than their pre-2006 predecessors. Additional ramps and tunnels were built for easier access, and bottlenecks were engineered out. Large canopies are planned to cover each of the three jamrah pillars to protect pilgrims from the desert sun. Ramps are also being built adjacent to the pillars to speed evacuation in the event of an emergency. Additionally, Saudi authorities have issued a fatwa decreeing that the stoning may take place between sunrise and sunset, rather than at the mid-day time that most pilgrims prefer.

== Safety issues ==
During the Hajj, overcrowding on the bridge can create a hazard. Being the last day of the Hajj, some will bring their luggage.

- On May 23, 1994, a stampede killed at least 270 pilgrims.
- On April 9, 1998, at least 118 pilgrims were trampled to death and 180 injured.
- On March 5, 2001, 35 pilgrims were trampled to death in a stampede.
- On February 11, 2003, the stoning of the Devil ritual claimed 14 pilgrims' lives.
- On February 1, 2004, 251 pilgrims were killed and another 244 injured in a stampede.
- On January 12, 2006, a stampede killed at least 346 pilgrims and injured at least 289 more.
- On September 24, 2015, the 2015 Mina disaster in the tent city near the bridge killed between 1,100 and 2,431 people and injured 934.

Following the 2004 crush, Saudi authorities embarked on major construction work in and around the Jamaraat Bridge area. Additional access ways, footbridges, and emergency exits were built, and the three cylindrical pillars were replaced with longer and taller oblong walls of concrete to enable more pilgrims simultaneous access. The next year they announced plans for a new, four-storey bridge.

Keith Still, professor of crowd science at Manchester Metropolitan University was consulted in 2004 by the Saudi authorities on designs for the new Jamarat bridge, to ease the bottleneck in front of the pillars. He pointed out that this may not solve the overall problem. The efficiency of the bridge would be improved, becoming able to handle 500,000 to 600,000 people an hour instead of the previous 200,000, but putting pressure on other parts of the complex system, enabling greater numbers of people to arrive at potential bottlenecks further along the route. The layout of the Mina valley encampment, where the 2015 Mina disaster happened, had not changed. Keith Still considers that redesign of the whole complex could make the Hajj safe, but others consider that an event with the crowd density of the hajj is inherently dangerous, with challenges at the pinch points. Edwin Galea of the Fire Safety Engineering Group at the University of Greenwich pointed out that the 500,000 people per hour that the Jamaraat Bridge could deliver was equivalent to the largest ever football crowd every 24 minutes, or the population of Germany in a week; he suggested that spreading the Hajj over a longer period was a possible solution.

The need to stone the devil at all was questioned by Egyptian physician and feminist writer Nawal El Saadawi, who said that the crush happened because people were fighting to do this, and was dubious of talk about changing the way the Hajj is administered and making people travel in smaller groups.

== See also ==
- Incidents during the Hajj

== Notes ==
1. "Deadly Mecca-crush Blamed on Bridge-Bottleneck". Sydney Morning Herald. January 13, 2006.
2. Minshawi.com
3. Hajj ritual sees new safety moves BBC News Tuesday, 10 January 2006, 19:17 GMT.
4. Hajj crush police 'not to blame' BBC News Friday, 13 January 2006, 17:34 GMT
5. Nine-storey Jamraat Bridge will accommodate 9 million pilgrims per day Saudi Arabia Information Resource 04/02/2004.

As Hajj Begins, More Changes and Challenges In Store saudi-expatriates.com, 8 June 2022
