= Nouara Saadia =

Algerian politician

Nouara Saâdia Djaâfar
- Born: February 13, 1950 (age 76); Sétif, Algeria
- Citizenship: Algerian
- Occupation: Politician
- Office: Member of the Council of the Nation; Minister of Family and Women (2003–2012)
- Political party: National Liberation Front

Nouara Saâdia Djaâfar (born 13 February 1950 in Setif, Algeria) is an Algerian politician and Minister responsible for Family and Women.

== Sources ==
- "Apràs Ferhat Mhenni, Nouara Saâdia Djaffar fustige Hadj Lakhdar". 11 October 2008.
- Algeria-Watch. "Nouara Saâdia Djaffar appelle les femmes à refuser de présenter un certificat de virginité à l'état civil". www.algeria-watch.org.
