= Morufdeen Adeola Adefolabi =

Nigerian politician

Member of the House of Representatives
- In office 2007–2011
- Constituency: Ifako-Ijaiye Federal Constituency

Personal details
- Born: 1953 Ojokoro, Lagos State, Nigeria
- Died: 24 September 2015 (aged 61–62)
- Occupation: Politician

Morufdeen Adeola Adefolabi was a Nigerian politician from Ojokoro Local Government Area of Lagos State, Nigeria. He served in the Lagos State House of Representatives, representing the Ifako Ijaiye Federal Constituency from 2007 to 2011. He also served as the Chairman of Ifako-Ijaiye Local Government Council (1999-2002), the first Local Government Chairman in Ojokoro Local Government Area (2004-2007), and Councillor and Supervisor for Agriculture and Rural Development in Agege Local Government Council.

== Death ==
On 24 September 2015, Adefolabi died at the age of 62 in the Mecca stampede. A Fidau prayer was organized on 13 October 2015 at Ifako-Ijaiye Mini-stadium by his family, political associates, and religious sect.
