= Toby Craig Jones =

American historian

- Occupation: Historian

Toby Craig Jones is a historian of the modern Middle East at Rutgers University, New Brunswick, New Jersey. Jones received his BA in 1994 and MA in 1998 from Auburn University. From 2004 to 2006 Jones worked as the Persian Gulf political analyst for the International Crisis Group. In 2006, Jones received his PhD in Middle Eastern History from Stanford University. From 2008 to 2009, Jones was a fellow at the Oil, Energy, and Middle East project at Princeton University. Currently an associate professor of history at Rutgers University, his general field of research concerns questions of energy and the history of science & technology in the modern Middle East. He advises on modern Middle East history, history of technology, environmental history, and global history.

Though specialized in middle eastern history evidenced by his first book publication, Desert Kingdom: How Oil and Water forged Modern Saudi Arabia, and noted as a political specialist on the Persian Gulf monarchies, Jones has increasingly shifted focus to questions covering environmental issues and the consequences such questions place on the processes of state formation and negotiation. In 2015 Rutgers University Press published his second book Running Dry: Essays on Energy, Water, and Environmental Crisis.
