= 2006 Hajj stampede =

Crowd crush in Mecca

- Date: 12 January 2006
- Location: Mina, Mecca, Saudi Arabia; 21°24′48″N 39°53′36″E
- Deaths: 363
- Injuries: 1,000+

The 2006 Hajj stampede or crush resulted in the deaths of 363 pilgrims on 12 January 2006 during the Hajj in Mecca, Saudi Arabia. The stampede occurred on Jamaraat Bridge around 1 pm on 12 January 2006, the fifth and final day of the Hajj. Between two and three million pilgrims attended the Hajj in 2006. Earlier, on 5 January at least 76 pilgrims had died when a hostel collapsed in Mecca.

The January 12 stampede was caused by pilgrims tripping over luggage.

== Background ==
The Hajj is an annual pilgrimage in Mecca undertaken by able-bodied Muslims at least once in their lifetime. It consists of a series of rites including the Stoning of the Devil (Arabic: رمي الجمرات ramī aj-jamarāt, lit. "stoning of the jamarāt [place of pebbles]") which takes place in Mina, a district of Mecca. The stoning ritual is the last major ritual and is often regarded as the most dangerous part of the Hajj, with stampedes having occurred in the past.

With a history of fatal stampedes and crushes at the Hajj – including a stampede which killed 244 in 2004 – authorities in Mecca had taken steps in the hopes of reducing chances of another stampede, including the issuing of a fatwa extending the permitted hours of the ritual.

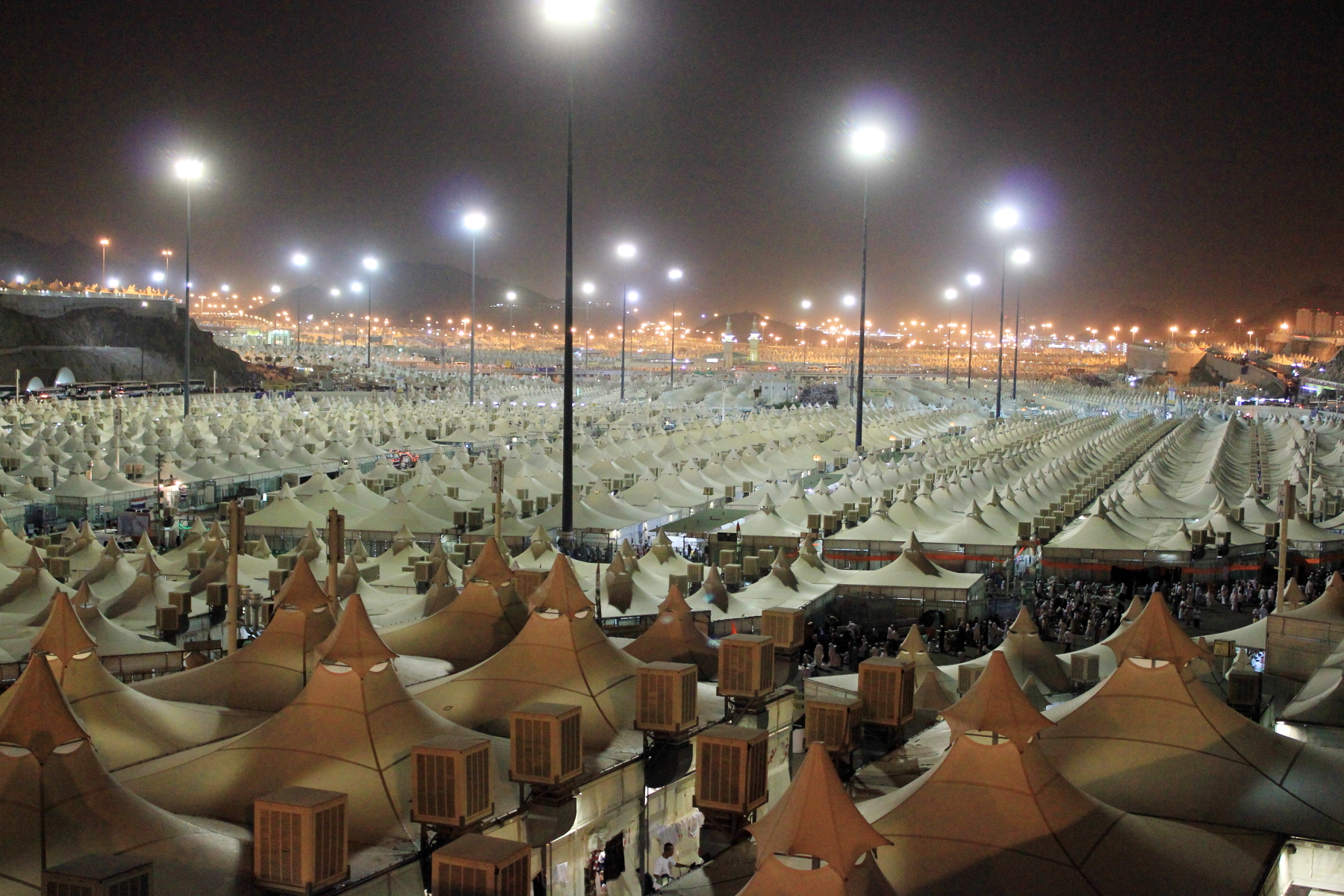
Mina camp sites, 2011.

== Incident & casualties ==
Tens of thousands of pilgrims rushing to finish a symbolic stoning ritual before sunset during the annual pilgrimage tripped over luggage on Thursday, 12 January 2006, causing a stampede which killed 363 people and injured hundreds more.

Saudi Interior Ministry Spokesman Major-General Mansur al-Turki said that the incident took place at 12:28 [09:28 GMT]. The stampede occurred at Jamarat Bridge, during an event where stones are thrown by pilgrims to three pillars representing the devil to purge themselves of sin.

=== Genders and nationalities of casualties ===
The number of fatalities reached 363, of whom 203 were identified within the first two days. Among deaths were 118 males and 85 females.

Casualties include multiple nationalities, with Chinese, Moroccans, Afghans, Ethiopians, Bangladeshis, Algerians, Saudis, Jordanians, Yemenis, Iraqis, Iranians, Syrians, Turks, Sudanese, Maldivians, Egyptians, Indians, Omanis, Pakistanis, Nigerians, Palestinians and nationals from Germany, Belgium, Chad and Ghana.

=== Eyewitness reports ===
"The bodies were piled up. I couldn't count them—they were too many," said Suad Abu Hamada.
"Everybody was pushing from behind to get through and suddenly police blocked the entrance and people started falling on each other", said Mohammed al-Farra.

== Reactions and immediate action by Saudi government ==
Despite criticism of the Saudi government from the relatives of the stampede's casualties, Saudi officials put the blame on unruly pilgrims for causing the stampede and denied that authorities could have done more to stop the stampede. Saudi interior ministry spokesman, Maj Gen Mansour al-Turki, told the BBC's Newshour programme that the dangers would only increase if crowd controls were tightened further. "People insist that they want to finish their Hajj in the way they think is right and you have a limited effect in using policemen to control people in this regard," he said. "You cannot really control them by force because if you do probably you will increase the problem because you will have people pushing you. We had so many police officers today who were injured in this situation."

Seventy ambulances were used by Saudi officials to rush the victims to seven hospitals in Mina and nearby Arafat.

After the casualties had been removed, the Saudi government used bulldozers to clear the area so the ceremony could continue.

== Aftermath ==
=== Infrastructure ===
The Saudi government had invested in improving crowd flow at Jamaraat Bridge, by widening it to eight lanes.

Plans for the bridge to be demolished and rebuilt as a four-storey structure with air-conditioning were approved in 2005. This work went ahead immediately after the January 2006 Hajj and was completed prior to the 2009 Hajj.

These infrastructure improvements were not accompanied by adequate signage telling pilgrims which direction to travel, a problem given that most Hajjis have never visited before.

=== 'Illegal' pilgrims ===
There have been repeated calls to restrict the numbers allowed to attend the Hajj and, in particular, 'illegal' pilgrims. 'Illegal' pilgrims are those who do not hold a Hajj permit, Mecca residence permit or a Hajj work permit. There were reports of up to one million illegal pilgrims in 2006.

Crackdowns on such pilgrims have become an increasing feature of security arrangements.

=== Pilgrims' education ===
Calls continued to be made for better disaster planning long after the 2006 crush, with suggestions to make pilgrims aware of that the stoning ritual can take place at various times as well as training on basic preventive measures for infectious diseases and outbreaks and how to stay safe in large crowds.

By 2009, large bags had been banned during the stoning rituals.

== Health risks ==
The annual Islamic pilgrimage to Mecca has always been challenging. The 2006 Hajj was no different though no reports indicated any specific incidents arising.

=== Infectious diseases ===
Because of heavy congestion, shared accommodation, air pollution, compromised hygiene and heat, the transmission of infectious diseases is high.

Due to climate change, the Middle East has had a rising surface temperature since the 1970s. Pilgrims are expected to spend between 20–30 hours outside during the 5-6-day rituals in an average heat of 43 °C (highest 50 °C). The expected extreme heat and humidity is going to exceed the danger threshold by 20% between the years 2045 and 2053 creating an even more challenging Hajj.

Due to population growth, economic growth and advancement in transport attendance between 2000 and 2010 increased by 46%. Global travel directly amplifies the risk of disease transmission.

=== Vaccinations ===
- All visitors from both yellow fever and/or polio-affected countries must present valid certificates and/or vaccination evidence upon entry to Saudi Arabia.
- All visitors must have proof of vaccination against meningitis.
- The Saudi Arabia Ministry of Health recommends travellers to have the influenza, pertussis and measles vaccinations.

=== Non-communicable diseases ===
- 50% of pilgrims suffer with diabetes.
- 64% of admissions into intensive care are for cardiovascular diseases.
- 46–66% of deaths during the Hajj are from cardiovascular diseases.

== See also ==
- Incidents during the Hajj
