= 2004 Hajj stampede =

Fatal injuries during Islamic pilgrimage

- Date: 1 February 2004
- Location: Mina, Mecca, Saudi Arabia
- Deaths: 251+
- Injuries: 244+

The 2004 Hajj stampede resulted in the deaths of at least 251 pilgrims on 1 February 2004 during the annual Hajj pilgrimage in Mecca, Saudi Arabia. The incident took place during the ritual stoning of three pillars in the Mina valley, close to Mecca, on the final day of Hajj ceremonies. More than 200 people were injured, and the incident became the worst tragedy during the Hajj since 1990.

== See also ==
- Incidents during the Hajj
