= 2001 Hajj stampede =

Crowd crush in Mecca, Saudi Arabia

- Date: 5 March 2001
- Location: Mina, Mecca, Saudi Arabia
- Deaths: 35+

The 2001 Hajj stampede resulted in the deaths of at least 35 pilgrims on 5 March 2001 during the Hajj in Mecca, Saudi Arabia. The incident took place during the Stoning of Satan ritual. The pilgrims were killed after a large crowd surged towards one of the three giant pillars representing the devil at which worshippers cast stones. A civil defense official later attributed the casualties to congestion and jostling among the pilgrims, resulting in some, particularly the elderly, tripping and falling.
