= Stoning of the Devil =

Ritual performed by Muslims during Hajj in Mecca, Saudi Arabia

Coordinates: 21.4212°N 39.8726°E

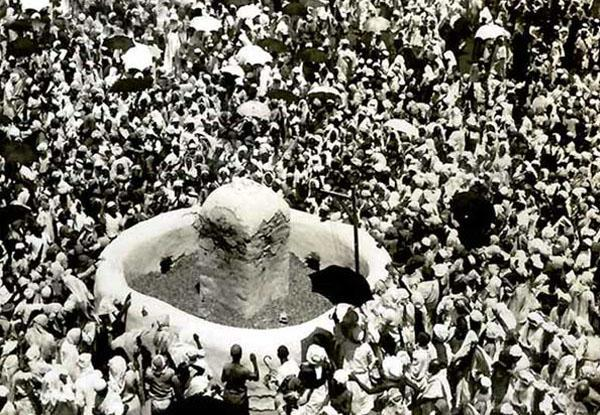
A Stoning of the Devil from 1942

The Stoning of the Devil (Arabic: رمي الجمرات ramy al-jamarāt, lit. "throwing of the jamarāt [place of pebbles]") is part of the annual Islamic Hajj pilgrimage to the holy city of Mecca in Saudi Arabia. During the ritual, Muslim pilgrims throw pebbles at three walls (formerly pillars), called jamarāt, from the Jamaraat Bridge in the city of Mina just east of Mecca. It is a symbolic reenactment of Ibrahim's (or Abraham's) hajj, where he stoned three pillars representing the Shaitan (or Satan), and Muslims' temptation to disobey the will of Allah.

On Eid al-Adha (the 10th day of the month of Dhu al-Hijjah), pilgrims must strike the Big Jamarah or Al-Jamrah Al-Aqaba with seven pebbles. After the stoning is completed on the day of Eid, every pilgrim must cut or shave their hair. On each of the following two days, they must hit all three walls with seven pebbles each, going in order from east to west. Thus at least 21 pebbles are needed for the ritual; more stones would be needed if they failed to hit the pillar. It is permissible for the stones to fall into the designated areas of the pillars, and there is no need to throw them again if they land in the appropriate vicinity.

Some pilgrims stay at Mina for an additional day, in which case they must again stone each wall seven times. The pebbles used in the stoning are traditionally gathered at Muzdalifah, a plain southeast of Mina, on the night before the first throwing, but can also be collected at Mina.

== Replacement of the pillars ==
Until 2004, the three jamarāt (singular: jamrah) were tall pillars. After the 2004 Hajj stampede, Saudi authorities replaced the pillars with 26-metre-long (85 ft) walls for safety; many people were accidentally throwing pebbles at people on the other side. To allow easier access to the jamarāt, a single-tiered pedestrian bridge called the Jamaraat Bridge was built around them, allowing pilgrims to throw stones from either ground level or from the bridge.

The jamarāt are named (starting from the east):

- the first jamrah (al-jamrah al-'ūlā), or the smallest jamrah (الجمرة الصغرى al-jamrah aṣ-ṣughrā),
- the middle jamrah (الجمرة الوسطى al-jamrah al-wusṭā),
- the largest jamrah (الجمرة الكبرى al-jamrah al-kubrā), or Jamrah of Aqaba (جمرة العقبة jamrat al-ʿaqaba).

Before 2004, the distance between the small and middle jamarāt was 135 m (443 ft); between the middle and large jamarāt it was 225 m (738 ft).

== Historical and spiritual significance ==
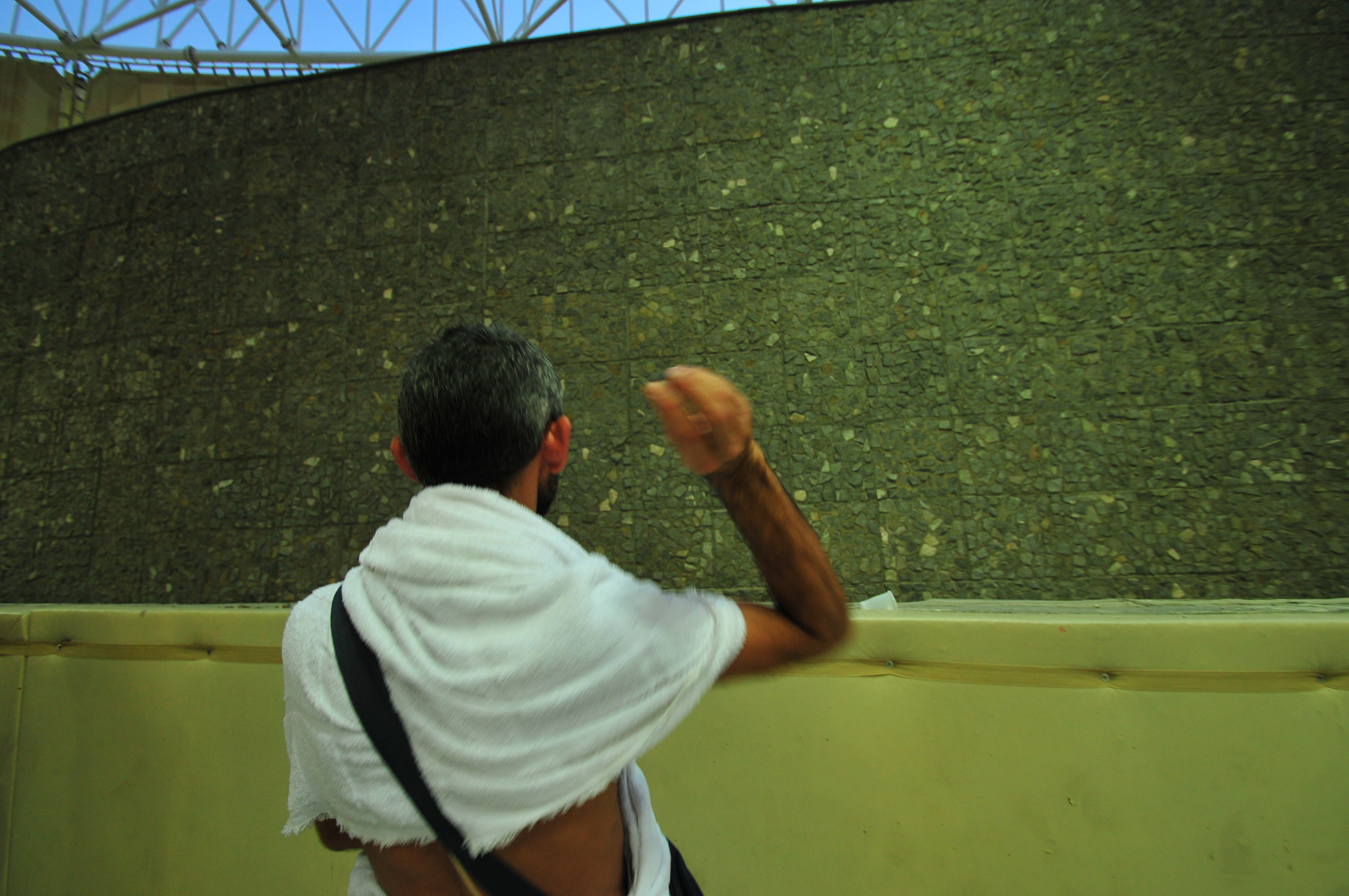
A Hajji participating in the ritual of Jamarat.

The ritual re-enacts Abraham's pilgrimage to Mecca as explained by the Muslim historian al-Azraqi:

When he [Abraham] left Mina and was brought down to (the defile called) al-Aqaba, the Devil appeared to him at Stone-Heap of the Defile. Gabriel (Jibrayil) said to him: "Pelt him!" so Abraham threw seven stones at him so that he disappeared from him. Then he appeared to him at the Middle Stone-Heap. Gabriel said to him: "Pelt him!" so he pelted him with seven stones so that he disappeared from him. Then he appeared to him at the Little Stone-Heap. Gabriel said to him: "Pelt him!" so he pelted him with seven stones like the little stones for throwing with a sling. So the Devil withdrew from him.

All three jamarāt represent the devil: the first and largest represents his temptation of Abraham against sacrificing Ishmael (Ismāʿīl); the second represents the temptation of Abraham's wife Hagar (Hājar) to induce her to stop him; the third represents his temptation of Ishmael to avoid being sacrificed. He was rebuked each time, and the throwing of the stones symbolizes those rebukes.

The stoning of the jamarāt also represents the repudiation of man's self (an-nafs al-'amāra, literally the "internal despot") and the act of casting aside one's low desires and wishes. As one Islamic theologian states:

If one is able to crush al‑nafs al‑'amāra during the stoning of Jamrat al‑ʿAqaba (the Jamrah of Aqaba), then one has taken the next step in attaining closeness to Allah, and since between the servant and Allah there is no more than the distance of one step, if one has been able to take this step and make it past one's own low desires and wishes, then that which follows is the level of closeness to Allah.

During those two or three days after the Eid that one is in Mina, one must stone the three jamarāt, meaning that one must trample upon his internal despot (an-nafs al-'amāra), the external despot of the Shaitan from the Jinn, and the Shayṭān from among the Humans (the enemies of religion and of humanity).

The stoning of the three jamarāt is, in essence, the trampling upon the despots and waging war against all of them. When one focuses on them and the hatred for them, then one automatically focuses with complete attention upon one's self – and rightfully so – while stoning the jamarāt, one must focus entirely upon one's self. It is an attack on a person's internal temptations or base desires, and signals a moving away from the self and towards further submission to Allah's will.

== Incidents ==
The Stoning of the Devil ritual is considered the most dangerous part of the pilgrimage, as sudden crowd movements on or near the Jamaraat Bridge can cause people to be crushed. On several occasions, thousands of participants have suffocated or been trampled to death in crowd crushes.

An important step in managing crowds is the recent replacement of the jamarāt pillars by walls to ease and speed up the stoning. The bridge has also been widened in recent years to accommodate the ever-growing number of pilgrims who perform the Hajj each year.

Crowd conditions are especially difficult during the final day of Hajj, which is the day pilgrims leave the valley of Mina and return to Mecca for the farewell Tawaf (the final circumambulation of the Kaaba). According to hadith, Muhammad's last stoning was performed just after the noon prayer. Many scholars feel that the ritual can be done any time between noon and sunset on this day; however, many Muslims are taught that it should be done immediately after the noon prayer. This leads to people camping out until noon and rushing out then to do the stoning.

These two factors have been said to be most responsible for a stampede during the Hajj of 2006 which killed at least 346 pilgrims and injured at least 289 more. This was despite several attempts by the authorities to inform pilgrims about the permissibility of staggering their visits to the jamarāt as well as instructing them to leave their luggage at their tents. Adding to the confusion involved in the tragedy is the lack of co-operation on the part of pilgrims who do not leave the jamarāt area by the proper route, and therefore interfere with the movements of others who are arriving.

Another crush occurred on September 24, 2015, in Mina when at least 2,411 pilgrims were killed, a new Associated Press count shows, three times the number of deaths acknowledged by the kingdom three months later. The AP figures establish the September 24 crush at Mina as the deadliest in the history of the annual pilgrimage. It occurred just weeks after a fatal crane collapse in Mecca.

Authorities have said the Mina crush and stampede occurred when two waves of pilgrims converged on a narrow road, suffocating or trampling to death those caught in the disaster.

Saudi Arabia has spent billions of dollars on crowd control and safety measures for those attending the annual five-day pilgrimage, required of every able-bodied, financially capable, Muslim once in his or her life, but the sheer number of participants makes ensuring their safety difficult.

However, experts have said that the density of the crowds is very likely to lead to a crowd collapse in such circumstances. Ed Galea of the University of Greenwich said: "If you're designing an event to handle that crowd density, it's inherently dangerous." He pointed out that the 500,000 people an hour who could cross the Jamarat bridge after it was widened in 2004 is equivalent to the largest-ever football crowd once every 24 minutes or the population of Germany in a week. One possible solution would be to spread the Hajj over a longer period.

== See also ==
- Burning of Judas - A similar ritual that takes place during Easter in some Christian communities.
