= Al-Abtah =

Historic valley near Makkah, Saudi Arabia

Al-Abtah Al-Muhassab
- Valley
- Location in Saudi Arabia
- Coordinates: 21.4227°N 39.8946°E
- Country: Saudi Arabia
- Region: Makkah
- City: Makkah
- Time zone: UTC+3 (AST)
- Website: https://www.makkah.gov.sa/
- Significant resting place of Muhammad during the Farewell Hajj.

Al-Abtah (Arabic: الأبطح), also known as Al-Muhassab, is a significant valley located between Makkah and Mina in Saudi Arabia. This area holds historical and religious importance in Islamic tradition.

The Islamic prophet Muhammad camped at Al-Abtah after completing the rites of Hajj during his Farewell Pilgrimage. He prayed Zuhr, Asr, Maghrib, and Isha there and rested before returning to Makkah. This act is authentically reported in Hadith and was followed by many of his companions. Though not a required part of Hajj, Al-Abtah became known as a Sunnah resting place for pilgrims after the days of Tashreeq due to Muhammad's actions.

== Location and Description ==
Al-Abtah is a wide valley situated between Makkah and Mina, near the two hills leading to the cemeteries. The valley accumulates gravel carried by floodwaters, giving it the name "Al-Abtah." In contemporary times, it is referred to as Al-Ja'fariyyah and falls within the Al-Jummayzah district of Makkah.

== Historical Significance ==
During the Farewell Hajj, Muhammad camped at Al-Abtah after departing from Mina on the 13th of Dhu al-Hijjah, the third day of Tashreeq. This stop was not a ritual of Hajj but served as a convenient resting place for the journey back to Madinah.

== Hadith Narrations Regarding Al-Abtah ==
Several hadiths highlight the significance of Al-Abtah:

- Narrated by Aisha: "It (i.e., Al-Abtah) was a place where the Prophet ﷺ used to camp so that it might be easier for him to depart."
- Narrated by Ibn Umar: "Allah's Messenger ﷺ and Abu Bakr and Umar observed halt at al-Abtah."
- Narrated by Anas: "I asked Anas b. Malik to tell me about something he knew about Allah's Messenger ﷺ, viz. where he observed the noon prayer on Yaum al-Tarwiya. He said: At Mina. I said: Where did he observe the afternoon prayer on the Yaum an-Nafr? and he said: It was at al-Abtah."

== Current Relevance ==
Today, Al-Abtah remains a notable location for pilgrims traveling between Makkah and Mina. While the stop at Al-Abtah is not a mandatory ritual of Hajj, it is considered a Sunnah (commendable practice) to pause there briefly, offer prayers, and make supplications during the pilgrimage.

== See also ==
- Mount Arafat
- Masjid al-Namirah
