= Public holidays in Malaysia =

States that observe a Saturday–Sunday weekend States that observe a Friday–Saturday weekend

Public holidays in Malaysia are regulated at both federal and state levels, mainly based on a list of federal holidays observed nationwide plus a few additional holidays observed by each individual state and federal territory. The public holidays are a mix of secular holidays celebrating the nation and its history, and selected traditional holidays of the various ethnic and religious groups that make up the country.

The legislation governing public holidays in Malaysia includes the Holidays Act 1951 (Act 369) in Peninsular Malaysia and Labuan, the Holidays Ordinance (Sabah Cap. 56) in Sabah and the Public Holidays Ordinance (Sarawak Cap. 8) in Sarawak.

The workweek and weekend varies between states, with most states and federal territories observing a Saturday–Sunday weekend, while Kedah, Kelantan and Terengganu observe a Friday–Saturday weekend. Johor previously observed a Friday–Saturday weekend, though many private businesses and banks chose to observe a Saturday–Sunday weekend due to close business ties with Singapore. In states and territories with a Saturday–Sunday weekend, a public holiday that falls on Sunday is substituted by a holiday on Monday, or the next working day if Monday itself is a public holiday. In Kedah, a public holiday that falls on Friday is replaced by Sunday or the next working day, while in Kelantan and Terengganu, a public holiday that falls on Saturday is replaced by Sunday or the next working day.

Starting 1 January 2025, the weekend for Johor changed from Friday-Saturday to Saturday-Sunday, ten years after it was changed to Friday-Saturday in 2014.

== Overview ==
=== Federal holidays ===
Federal public holidays are fixed by the federal government and are observed nationwide with some exceptions. They are:

Date	English name	Malay name	Remarks
1 May	Labour Day	Hari Pekerja Antarbangsa	
31 August	Independence Day	Hari Kebangsaan Malaysia	Anniversary of the decralation of independence by Tunku Abdul Rahman in 1957
16 September	Malaysia Day	Hari Malaysia	
25 December	Christmas Day	Hari Krismas	
1 Muharram	Islamic New Year	Awal Muharram	
12 Rabīʿ al-ʾAwwal	Mawlid	Maulidur Rasul	
1 Shawwal	Eid al-Fitr	Hari Raya Aidilfitri	Two days holiday
10 Dhu'l-Hijja	Eid al-Adha	Hari Raya Aidiladha	Two days in Kelantan and Terengganu, one day in rest of the country
Variable	Yang di-Pertuan Agong's Birthday	Hari Keputeraan Yang di-Pertuan Agong	
Variable	Chinese New Year	Tahun Baru Cina	One day in Kelantan and Terengganu, two days in rest of the country
Variable	Vesak Day	Hari Wesak	
Variable	Deepavali	Hari Dipavali	

Each state and federal territory observes 14 days of federal holidays, except Sarawak which observes 13 days.

Although the second day of Chinese New Year is not listed as a federal holiday in Kelantan and Terengganu, the holiday is gazetted as a state holiday in both states, effectively making it a nationwide holiday. Additionally, the second day of Hari Raya Qurban is gazetted as a state holiday in Kedah and Perlis.

=== State holidays ===
In addition to the federal public holidays, each state may gazette a number of state public holidays to be observed in the state. For the federal territories, the Prime Minister is in charge of designating the territorial public holidays to be observed in each federal territory.

In every state, the official birthday of the state ruler or governor is celebrated as a public holiday. In the federal territories, the Federal Territory Day is celebrated instead.

The most widespread state holiday is New Year's Day which is observed in eight states and all three federal territories, followed by Nuzul al-Quran in seven states and all three federal territories, and Thaipusam in five states and two federal territories.

As of 2020, each state and federal territory has designated four to six state public holidays, bringing the total number of (federal and state) public holidays to 20 days in Sabah and Terengganu, 19 days in Labuan, Penang and Sarawak and 18 days in the rest of the country.

=== Holidays by declaration ===
Section 8 of the Holidays Act 1951 gives the Prime Minister power to declare any day a public holiday in the whole of Peninsular Malaysia and Labuan, or in one of the federal territories, or in one of the states after consultation with the relevant state government. The declared holiday must be observed by all employers as a paid holiday.

Public holidays had been declared on the polling day for a general election, on the day of the installation of the Yang di-Pertuan Agong, as well as after international sporting events to celebrate the achievements of Malaysian athletes.

At the state level, the state government may declare an occasional holiday (cuti peristiwa) for events such as the installation of the state ruler, after major achievements in sporting events, or even to provide an extra holiday but unable to officially gazette it (such as the annual holiday declaration for Thaipusam in Kedah). Unlike holidays declared under Section 8 of the Holidays Act 1951, observance of occasional state holidays by private businesses and organizations is voluntary, while government offices and schools (except for nationwide exams) are closed.

In Sabah and Sarawak, the power to declare any day as a public holiday rests with the state governor (in practice, exercised on the advice of the state government) in accordance with the states' respective Holidays Ordinances.

==== List of public holidays by declaration under Section 8 of the Holidays Act 1951 ====
The table below lists additional holidays that were declared under Section 8 of the Holidays Act 1951 for Peninsular Malaysia and Labuan. Unless otherwise noted, the same days were also declared as holidays by Sabah and Sarawak in accordance to their respective Holidays Ordinances.

Year	Date	Remarks
2017	24 April (Mon)	Day of Installation of the 15th Yang di-Pertuan Agong
2017	4 September (Mon)	Additional holiday in commemoration of the 2017 SEA Games
2018	9 May (Wed)	Polling day for the 14th general election
2018	10 & 11 May (Thu & Fri)^{[A]}	Additional holidays for the 14th general election (except Sabah and Sarawak)
2018	10 & 13 May (Thu & Sun)^{[B]}	Additional holidays for the 14th general election (except Sabah and Sarawak)
2018	17 & 18 May (Thu & Fri)	Additional holidays for the 14th general election (Sarawak only)
2019	30 July (Tue)	Day of Installation of the 16th Yang di-Pertuan Agong
2022	18 & 19 November (Fri & Sat)	Eve of polling day and polling day for the 15th general election
2022	28 November (Mon)	Additional holiday for the 15th general election
2023	21 April (Fri)	Additional holiday for Hari Raya Aidilfitri
2025	15 September (Mon)	Additional holiday for Malaysia Day

^{A} In states and federal territories observing the Saturday—Sunday weekend
^{B} In states observing the Friday—Saturday weekend

=== Public holidays falling on the same day ===
For government institutions, there is no automatic replacement holiday when two public holidays fall on the same working day, although the government may designate another day as a public holiday. For private sector employees, if the employer chooses to observe both public holidays, a replacement holiday is given on the next working day, or another day if the employees agree.

== Entitlement in employment law ==
In Peninsular Malaysia and Labuan, employees whose employment is covered by the Employment Act 1955 are entitled to 11 paid public holidays a year. Five of the holidays are fixed by law: National Day, Yang di-Pertuan Agong's Birthday, birthday of the ruler or governor of the state (Federal Territory Day in the federal territories) where the employee is contracted to work, Labour Day and Malaysia Day. The remaining six paid holidays are chosen by the employer from the gazetted public holidays, with notice provided to employees before the start of each calendar year. In addition, any public holiday declared under Section 8 of the Holidays Act 1951 is to be observed as a paid holiday.

Should an employee be required to work on a paid holiday, the employee may be given another day off (public holidays other than 5 mandatory public holidays), or compensated at two times their ordinary wages in addition to holiday pay. Overtime work done on a paid holiday is to be compensated at three times the hourly rate of pay (or three times the ordinary rate per piece for piece-rated employees).

Public holiday entitlements in Sabah and Sarawak are governed by the Labour Ordinance of the respective states. Both Ordinances have the status of federal law and were extensively amended by the Parliament of Malaysia in 2025 to align most of their provisions with the Employment Act 1955. Employees in Sabah are entitled to 15 paid public holidays a year while those in Sarawak are entitled to 18 days. Both states designate National Day, the Yang di-Pertuan Agong's Birthday, the State Governor's Birthday, Labour Day, and Malaysia Day as fixed paid holidays, with Sarawak additionally observing Sarawak Independence Day. The provisions on compensation for work done on paid holidays are identical to the Employment Act 1955.

== Table of public holidays ==
All holidays are state/territorial public holidays unless otherwise indicated.

Date	English name	Malay name	Johor	Kedah	Kelantan	Kuala Lumpur	Labuan	Malacca	Negeri Sembilan	Pahang	Penang	Perak	Perlis	Putrajaya	Sabah	Sarawak	Selangor	Terengganu
1 January	New Year's Day	Hari Tahun Baru	No	No	No	Yes							No	Yes				No
14 January	Yang di-Pertuan Besar of Negeri Sembilan's Birthday	Hari Keputeraan Yang di-Pertuan Besar Negeri Sembilan	No	No	No	No	No	No	Yes	No	No	No	No	No	No	No	No	No
Full moon in the month of Thai (January–February)	Thaipusam	Hari Thaipusam	Yes	No	No	Yes	No	No	Yes	No	Yes		No	Yes	No	No	Yes	No
First two days of the first lunar month (January–February)	Chinese New Year	Tahun Baru Cina	Two days; federal holiday (except second day in Kelantan and Terengganu, where it is a state holiday)															
1 February	Federal Territory Day	Hari Wilayah Persekutuan	No	No	No	Yes		No	No	No	No	No	No	Yes	No	No	No	No
20 February	Independence Declaration Day	Hari Pengisytiharan Tarikh Kemerdekaan	No	No	No	No	No	Yes	No	No	No	No	No	No	No	No	No	No
4 March	Sultan of Terengganu's Installation Day	Hari Ulang Tahun Pertabalan Sultan Terengganu	No	No	No	No	No	No	No	No	No	No	No	No	No	No	No	Yes
30 March	Governor of Sabah's Birthday	Hari Jadi Yang di-Pertua Negeri Sabah	No	No	No	No	No	No	No	No	No	No	No	No	Yes	No	No	No
23 March	Sultan of Johor's Birthday	Hari Keputeraan Sultan Johor	Yes	No	No	No	No	No	No	No	No	No	No	No	No	No	No	No
Friday before Easter (western Christianity) (March–April)	Good Friday	Jumaat Agung	No	No	No	No	No	No	No	No	No	No	No	No	Yes		No	No
26 April	Sultan of Terengganu's Birthday	Hari Keputeraan Sultan Terengganu	No	No	No	No	No	No	No	No	No	No	No	No	No	No	No	Yes
1 May	Labour Day	Hari Pekerja	Federal holiday															
First full moon in May	Vesak	Hari Wesak	Federal holiday															
17 May	Raja of Perlis's Birthday	Hari Keputeraan Raja Perlis	No	No	No	No	No	No	No	No	No	No	Yes	No	No	No	No	No
22 May	Hari Hol of Pahang	Hari Hol Pahang	No	No	No	No	No	No	No	Yes	No	No	No	No	No	No	No	No
30 and 31 May	Tadau Kaamatan	Pesta Kaamatan (Pesta Menuai)	No	No	No	No	Two days	No	No	No	No	No	No	No	Two days	No	No	No
1 and 2 June	Gawai Dayak	Perayaan Hari Gawai Dayak	No	No	No	No	No	No	No	No	No	No	No	No	No	Two days	No	No
First Monday of June	Yang di-Pertuan Agong's Birthday	Hari Keputeraan Yang di-Pertuan Agong	Federal holiday															
Third Sunday of June	Sultan of Kedah's Birthday	Hari Keputeraan Sultan Kedah	No	Yes	No	No	No	No	No	No	No	No	No	No	No	No	No	No
7 July	Declaration of George Town as World Heritage Site	Hari Ulang Tahun Perisytiharan Tapak Warisan Dunia	No	No	No	No	No	No	No	No	Yes	No	No	No	No	No	No	No
Second Saturday of July	Governor of Penang's Birthday	Hari Jadi Yang di-Pertua Negeri Pulau Pinang	No	No	No	No	No	No	No	No	Yes	No	No	No	No	No	No	No
22 July	Sarawak Independence Day	Hari Kemerdekaan Sarawak	No	No	No	No	No	No	No	No	No	No	No	No	No	Yes	No	No
25 July	Sultan of Pahang's Birthday	Hari Keputeraan Sultan Pahang	No	No	No	No	No	No	No	Yes	No	No	No	No	No	No	No	No
24 August	Governor of Malacca's Birthday	Hari Jadi Yang di-Pertua Negeri Melaka	No	No	No	No	No	Yes	No	No	No	No	No	No	No	No	No	No
31 August	National Day/Independence Day	Hari Kebangsaan/Hari Merdeka	Federal holiday															
16 September	Malaysia Day	Hari Malaysia	Federal holiday															
29 and 30 September	Sultan of Kelantan's Birthday	Hari Keputeraan Sultan Kelantan	No	No	Two days	No	No	No	No	No	No	No	No	No	No	No	No	No
Second Saturday of October	Governor of Sarawak's Birthday	Hari Jadi Yang di-Pertua Negeri Sarawak	No	No	No	No	No	No	No	No	No	No	No	No	No	Yes	No	No
Naraka Chaturdashi, the day preceding the new moon in the month of Aippasi (October–November) (Note: Subject to change based on astronomical considerations according to the Hindu almanac)	Deepavali	Deepavali	Federal holiday													No	Federal holiday	
First Friday of November	Sultan of Perak's Birthday	Hari Keputeraan Sultan Perak	No	No	No	No	No	No	No	No	No	Yes	No	No	No	No	No	No
11 December	Sultan of Selangor's Birthday	Hari Keputeraan Sultan Selangor	No	No	No	No	No	No	No	No	No	No	No	No	No	No	Yes	No
24 December	Christmas Eve	Hari Sebelum Krismas	No	No	No	No	No	No	No	No	No	No	No	No	Yes	No	No	No
25 December	Christmas	Hari Krismas	Federal holiday															
Holidays based on the Islamic calendar (does not align with the Earth's year cycle)
1 Muharram	First day of Muharram	Awal Muharram (Maal Hijrah)	Federal holiday															
6 Safar	Hari Hol of Sultan Iskandar of Johor	Hari Hol Almarhum Sultan Iskandar	Yes	No	No	No	No	No	No	No	No	No	No	No	No	No	No	No
12 Rabiulawal	Muhammad's Birthday	Hari Keputeraan Nabi Muhammad (Maulidur Rasul)	Federal holiday															
27 Rejab	Isra and Mi'raj	Israk dan Mikraj	No	Yes	No	No	No	No	Yes	No	No	No	Yes	No	No	No	No	Yes
1 Ramadan (Note: Subject to change based on the sighting of the new moon)	First day of Ramadan	Awal Ramadan	Yes		No	No	No	No	No	No	No	No	No	No	No	No	No	No
17 Ramadan	Anniversary of the Revelation of the Quran	Hari Nuzul Al-Quran	No	No	Yes			No	No	Yes					No	No	Yes	
1 and 2 Syawal	Eid al-Fitr	Hari Raya Puasa/Hari Raya Aidilfitri	Two days; federal holiday															
3 Syawal	Eid al-Fitr	Hari Raya Puasa/Hari Raya Aidilfitri	No	No	No	No	No	Yes	No	No	No	No	No	No	No	No	No	No
9 Zulhijjah	Day of Arafah	Hari Arafah	No	No	Yes	No	No	No	No	No	No	No	No	No	No	No	No	Yes
10 Zulhijjah	Eid al-Adha	Hari Raya Qurban/Hari Raya Haji/Hari Raya Aidiladha	Federal holiday															
11 Zulhijjah	Eid al-Adha	Hari Raya Qurban/Hari Raya Haji/Hari Raya Aidiladha	No	State	Federal	No	No	No	No	No	No	No	State	No	No	No	No	Federal
Total			18	18	19	18	19	18	18	18	19	18	18	18	20	19	18	20

== Types of holidays ==
Malaysia has one of the highest numbers of public holidays in the world, ranking number seven in the top ten countries after Thailand, Indonesia, India and Macau. Some holidays are federally gazetted public holidays and some are public holidays observed by individual states. Other festivals are observed by particular ethnic or religion groups, but are not public holidays. The main holy days of each major religion are public holidays, taking place on either the western calendar or religious ones.

=== Secular ===
The most widespread holiday is the "Hari Kebangsaan" (National Day), otherwise known as "Hari Merdeka" (Independence Day) on 31 August commemorating the independence of the Federation of Malaya. This, as well as Labour Day (1 May), the King's birthday (First Monday of June) and some other festivals are major national public holidays. Federal Territory day is celebrated in the three Federal territories. Malaysia Day, held on 16 September to commemorate the formation of Malaysia, became a nationwide holiday in 2010. Before that it was celebrated only in Sabah, Sarawak and Labuan. New Year's Day is also observed as a public holiday in all Malaysian states, except for Johor, Kedah, Kelantan, Perlis, and Terengganu.

=== Religious and ethnic ===
Muslim holidays are highly prominent in Malaysia. The most important of these is Hari Raya Puasa (also called Hari Raya Aidilfitri) which is the Malay translation of Eid al-Fitr. It is generally a festival honoured by the Muslims worldwide marking the end of Ramadan will the fasting month. In addition to Hari Raya Puasa, they also celebrate Hari Raya Aidiladha (also called Hari Raya Haji referring to its occurrence after the culmination of the annual Hajj or Hari Raya Qurban), Awal Muharram (Islamic New Year) and Maulidur Rasul (Birthday of Muhammad).

Malaysian Chinese typically hold the same festivals observed by Chinese around the world. Chinese New Year is the most prominent, lasting for 15-days and ending with Chap Goh Mei (十五暝). Other festivals celebrated by Chinese are the Qingming Festival, the Dragon Boat Festival and the Mid-Autumn Festival.

Malaysian Indians of the Hindu faith celebrate Deepavali, the festival of light, while Thaipusam is a celebration in which Hindu pilgrims from all over the country meet at the Batu Caves. The most important Sikh festival is the Sikh new year or Vaisakhi festival. Other important days are Lodi and Gurpurab. Other Indian and Indochinese communities observe their new year celebrations at around the same time, such as Pohela Boishakh of the Bengalis and Songkran (water festival) of the Thais. People in the northern states do celebrate the Thai festival of Loy Kratong.

Wesak (Malay for Vesak), the Buddhist festival commemorating Buddha's birth, is a public holiday. Malaysia's Christian community observes most of the holidays observed by Christians elsewhere, most notably Christmas and Easter. Good Friday, however, is only a public holiday in the two Bornean states. The harvest festivals of Gawai in Sarawak and Kaamatan in Sabah are also important for East Malaysians.

New Year's Day, Chinese New Year, and the start of the Islamic calendar are all public holidays.

== Participation ==
Despite most of the festivals being identified with a particular ethnic or religious group, festivities are often participated in by all Malaysians. One example of this is the celebration of Kongsi Raya which is used when Hari Raya Puasa and Chinese New Year coincide. The term Kongsi Raya (which means "sharing the celebration" in Malay) was coined because of the similarity between the word kongsi and the Chinese New Year greeting of Gong xi fa cai. Similarly, the portmanteau Deepa Raya was coined when Hari Raya Puasa and Deepavali coincided.

A practice known as "open house" (rumah terbuka) is common during the festivities, especially during Hari Raya Aidilfitri, Deepavali, Chinese New Year and Christmas. Open house means that all well-wishers are received and that everyone regardless of background is invited to attend. Open houses are normally held at the home of the host and food are also prepared by the host, however, there are also open houses held at larger public venues especially when hosted by government agencies or corporations. Also during the festivities, most Malaysians would take the time off work or school to return to their hometowns to celebrate the festivities with their extended relatives. This practice is commonly known as balik kampung and usually causes traffic jams on most highways in the country.

== Festivals of Malaysia ==
=== Muslim festivals ===
Festival	Date	Status	Ethnic Group	Note
Islamic New Year / Maal Hijrah / Awal Muharam	1 Muharam	Nationwide	Malay	
Maulidur Rasul	12 Rabiulawal	Nationwide	Malay	
Israk dan Mikraj	27 Rejab	Nationwide	Malay	
Awal Ramadan / Awal Berpuasa	1 Ramadan	Nationwide	Malay	
Nuzul al-Quran	17 Ramadan	Nationwide	Malay	
Hari Raya Aidilfitri / Hari Raya Puasa	1 Syawal	Nationwide	Malay	
Awal Zulhijjah	1 Zulhijjah	Nationwide	Malay	
Hari Arafah	9 Zulhijjah	Nationwide	Malay	
Hari Raya Aidiladha / Hari Raya Haji / Hari Raya Korban	10 Zulhijjah	Nationwide	Malay	

=== Buddhist festivals ===
Festival	Date	Status	Ethnic Group	Note
Vesak Day	Full moon day of the month of Vaisakha	Nationwide	Chinese, Indian, Siamese	

=== Christian festivals ===
Festival	Date	Status	Ethnic Group	Note
New Year's Day	1 January	Nationwide		
Intrudu Water Festival	Sunday before Ash Wednesday	Malacca	Kristang	
Good Friday	The Friday preceding Easter Sunday	Nationwide		
Easter		Nationwide		
Festa San Pedro	29 June	Malacca	Kristang	
Christmas Eve	24 December	Nationwide		
Christmas Day	25 December	Nationwide		

=== Hindu and Indian festivals ===
Festival	Date	Status	Ethnic Group	Note
Pongal	First day of the month of Thai	Nationwide	Tamil	Harvest festival; celebrates the end of the northeast monsoon and the beginning of the harvest season. The festival start with Bhogi on the eve Pongal and end with Kaanum Pongal
Parchu Bhogi	Last day of the month Margazhi	Malacca	TChitty	Traditional festival of Malacaa Chitty
Thaipusam	mid-January to mid-February	Nationwide	Indians	Occurs during the cool dry season following harvest.
Saraswati Puja	February	Nationwide	Indians (Mainly the Bengali Hindu community)	
Maha Shivaratri	February	Nationwide	Indians and other Hindu communities	
Holi	March	Nationwide	Gujaratis Hindu	
Panguni Uthiram	March	Nationwide	Tamil	It is celebrated on the confluence of Uttiram nakshatram on the purnima (full moon) of the month of Panguni
Ugadi	March	Nationwide	Telegus	
Rama Navami	March	Nationwide	Indians	
Puthandu / Vaisakhi/ Visu	April	Nationwide	Indians	Indian new year, also celebrated by other southeast Asian Buddhist community
Akshaya Tritiya	April to May	Nationwide	Both Hindu and Jains	Spring Festival
Raksha Bandhan	August	Nationwide	Gujaratis Hindu	honours the bond between siblings.
Krishna jayanthi	August	Nationwide	Indians and other Hindu communities	
Vinayagar Chaturthi	Between August and September	Nationwide	Indians and other Hindu communities	
Aadi Amavasai	August	Nationwide	Tamil	Observed during the monsoon season; associated with ancestral rites and agricultural preparations
Aadi Perukku	August	Nationwide	Tamil	Welcoming increasing river levels during monsoon
Onam	August	Nationwide	Malayalees	harvest festival of Kerala.
Navaratri	Between August and September	Nationwide	Indians and other Hindu communities	9 days festival start with Ayudha Puja and end with Vijayadashami
Deepavali / Diwali / Festival of Lights		Nationwide	Indians and other Hindu communities	Biggest Indian and Hindu festival in Malaysia
Skanda Sashti	October	Nationwide	Indians (Mainly South Indian)	
Kartika Deepam/Kartika Purnima	November	Nationwide	Indians (Mainly South Indian) and Sikh community	

=== Chinese festivals ===
Festival	Date	Status	Ethnic Group	Note
Beginning of Spring	February	Nationwide	Chinese	
Chinese New Year / Lunar New Year / Spring Festival	January/February	Nationwide	Chinese	
Festival of the Heavenly God or Jade Emperor	January/February	Nationwide	Chinese	
Lantern Festival / Chap Goh Meh	February/March	Nationwide	Chinese	
Qing Ming Festival / Cheng Beng	April	Nationwide	Chinese and Chitty	
Duanwu Festival / Dragon Boat Festival / Chang Festival	May/June	Nationwide	Chinese	
Qixi Festival / Chinese Valentine's Day	August	Nationwide	Chinese	
Hungry Ghost Festival	August/September	Nationwide	Chinese	
Nine Emperor Gods Festival	September/October	Nationwide	Chinese	
Mid-Autumn Festival / Mooncake Festival	September/October	Nationwide	Chinese	
Double Ninth Festival	9th day of the 9th lunar month	Nationwide	Chinese	
Dōngzhì Festival / Tang Chek Festival / Winter Solstice Festival	December	Nationwide	Chinese	

=== Ethnic festivals ===
Festival	Date	Status	Ethnic Group	Note
Pesta Kalimaran	31 March	Sabah	Murut	
Pesta Kaul	March or early April	Mukah, Sarawak	Melanau	
Songkran	April	West Malaysia	Siamese	
Regatta Lepa	20–22 April	Semporna, Sabah	East coast Bajau	
Tadau Kaamatan	30, 31 May	Sabah and Labuan	Kadazan-Dusun	
Hari Gawai	1, 2 June	Sarawak	Dayak	
Pesta Rumbia	9 and 10 July	Kuala Penyu, Sabah	Bisaya and Kadazan	
Pesta Kelapa	2 September	Kudat, Sabah	Rungus	
Tamu Besar	29 and 30 October	Kota Belud, Sabah	West coast Bajau	
Loi Krathong	October/November	West Malaysia	Siamese	
Pesta Jagung	5 and 6 November	Kota Marudu, Sabah	Kadazan-Dusun	

=== International and National Festivals ===
Festival	Date	Status	Ethnic Group	Note
International Women's Day	8 March	Worldwide		
International Workers' Day	1 May	Worldwide		
Mother's Day	Second Sunday of May	Worldwide		
Teachers' Days	16 May	Nationwide		
Father's Day	Third Sunday in June	Worldwide		
Parents' Day	First Sunday in July	Nationwide		

== See also ==
- Public holidays of Sabah

== Overview ==
=== Federal holidays ===
Federal public holidays are fixed by the federal government and are observed nationwide with some exceptions. They are:

Date	English name	Local name	Notes
1 May	Labour Day	Hari Pekerja Antarbangsa	
31 August	Independence Day	Hari Kebangsaan Malaysia	Anniversary of the decralation of independence by Tunku Abdul Rahman in 1957
16 September	Malaysia Day	Hari Malaysia	
25 December	Christmas Day	Hari Krismas	
1 Muharram	Islamic New Year	Awal Muharram	
12 Rabīʿ al-ʾAwwal	Mawlid	Maulidur Rasul	
1 Shawwal	Eid al-Fitr	Hari Raya Aidilfitri	Two days holiday
10 Dhu'l-Hijja	Eid al-Adha	Hari Raya Aidiladha	Two days in Kelantan and Terengganu, one day in rest of the country
Variable	Yang di-Pertuan Agong's Birthday	Hari Keputeraan Yang di-Pertuan Agong	
Variable	Chinese New Year	Tahun Baru Cina	One day in Kelantan and Terengganu, two days in rest of the country
Variable	Vesak Day	Hari Wesak	
Variable	Deepavali	Hari Dipavali	

Each state and federal territory observes 14 days of federal holidays, except Sarawak which observes 13 days.

Although the second day of Chinese New Year is not listed as a federal holiday in Kelantan and Terengganu, the holiday is gazetted as a state holiday in both states, effectively making it a nationwide holiday. Additionally, the second day of Hari Raya Qurban is gazetted as a state holiday in Kedah and Perlis.

=== State holidays ===
In addition to the federal public holidays, each state may gazette a number of state public holidays to be observed in the state. For the federal territories, the Prime Minister is in charge of designating the territorial public holidays to be observed in each federal territory.

In every state, the official birthday of the state ruler or governor is celebrated as a public holiday. In the federal territories, the Federal Territory Day is celebrated instead.

The most widespread state holiday is New Year's Day which is observed in eight states and all three federal territories, followed by Nuzul al-Quran in seven states and all three federal territories, and Thaipusam in five states and two federal territories.

As of 2020, each state and federal territory has designated four to six state public holidays, bringing the total number of (federal and state) public holidays to 20 days in Sabah and Terengganu, 19 days in Labuan, Penang and Sarawak and 18 days in the rest of the country.

=== Holidays by declaration ===
Section 8 of the Holidays Act 1951 gives the Prime Minister power to declare any day a public holiday in the whole of Peninsular Malaysia and Labuan, or in one of the federal territories, or in one of the states after consultation with the relevant state government. The declared holiday must be observed by all employers as a paid holiday.

Public holidays had been declared on the polling day for a general election, on the day of the installation of the Yang di-Pertuan Agong, as well as after international sporting events to celebrate the achievements of Malaysian athletes.

At the state level, the state government may declare an occasional holiday (cuti peristiwa) for events such as the installation of the state ruler, after major achievements in sporting events, or even to provide an extra holiday but unable to officially gazette it (such as the annual holiday declaration for Thaipusam in Kedah). Unlike holidays declared under Section 8 of the Holidays Act 1951, observance of occasional state holidays by private businesses and organizations is voluntary, while government offices and schools (except for nationwide exams) are closed.

In Sabah and Sarawak, the power to declare any day as a public holiday rests with the state governor (in practice, exercised on the advice of the state government) in accordance with the states' respective Holidays Ordinances.

==== List of public holidays by declaration under Section 8 of the Holidays Act 1951 ====
The table below lists additional holidays that were declared under Section 8 of the Holidays Act 1951 for Peninsular Malaysia and Labuan. Unless otherwise noted, the same days were also declared as holidays by Sabah and Sarawak in accordance to their respective Holidays Ordinances.

Year	Date	Remarks
2017	24 April (Mon)	Day of Installation of the 15th Yang di-Pertuan Agong
2017	4 September (Mon)	Additional holiday in commemoration of the 2017 SEA Games
2018	9 May (Wed)	Polling day for the 14th general election
2018	10 & 11 May (Thu & Fri)^{[A]}	Additional holidays for the 14th general election (except Sabah and Sarawak)
2018	10 & 13 May (Thu & Sun)^{[B]}	Additional holidays for the 14th general election (except Sabah and Sarawak)
2018	17 & 18 May (Thu & Fri)	Additional holidays for the 14th general election (Sarawak only)
2019	30 July (Tue)	Day of Installation of the 16th Yang di-Pertuan Agong
2022	18 & 19 November (Fri & Sat)	Eve of polling day and polling day for the 15th general election
2022	28 November (Mon)	Additional holiday for the 15th general election
2023	21 April (Fri)	Additional holiday for Hari Raya Aidilfitri
2025	15 September (Mon)	Additional holiday for Malaysia Day

^{A} In states and federal territories observing the Saturday—Sunday weekend
^{B} In states observing the Friday—Saturday weekend

=== Public holidays falling on the same day ===
For government institutions, there is no automatic replacement holiday when two public holidays fall on the same working day, although the government may designate another day as a public holiday. For private sector employees, if the employer chooses to observe both public holidays, a replacement holiday is given on the next working day, or another day if the employees agree.

== Entitlement in employment law ==
In Peninsular Malaysia and Labuan, employees whose employment is covered by the Employment Act 1955 are entitled to 11 paid public holidays a year. Five of the holidays are fixed by law: National Day, Yang di-Pertuan Agong's Birthday, birthday of the ruler or governor of the state (Federal Territory Day in the federal territories) where the employee is contracted to work, Labour Day and Malaysia Day. The remaining six paid holidays are chosen by the employer from the gazetted public holidays, with notice provided to employees before the start of each calendar year. In addition, any public holiday declared under Section 8 of the Holidays Act 1951 is to be observed as a paid holiday.

Should an employee be required to work on a paid holiday, the employee may be given another day off (public holidays other than 5 mandatory public holidays), or compensated at two times their ordinary wages in addition to holiday pay. Overtime work done on a paid holiday is to be compensated at three times the hourly rate of pay (or three times the ordinary rate per piece for piece-rated employees).

Public holiday entitlements in Sabah and Sarawak are governed by the Labour Ordinance of the respective states. Both Ordinances have the status of federal law and were extensively amended by the Parliament of Malaysia in 2025 to align most of their provisions with the Employment Act 1955. Employees in Sabah are entitled to 15 paid public holidays a year while those in Sarawak are entitled to 18 days. Both states designate National Day, the Yang di-Pertuan Agong's Birthday, the State Governor's Birthday, Labour Day, and Malaysia Day as fixed paid holidays, with Sarawak additionally observing Sarawak Independence Day. The provisions on compensation for work done on paid holidays are identical to the Employment Act 1955.

== Table of public holidays ==
All holidays are state/territorial public holidays unless otherwise indicated.

Date	English name	Malay name	Johor	Kedah	Kelantan	Kuala Lumpur	Labuan	Malacca	Negeri Sembilan	Pahang	Penang	Perak	Perlis	Putrajaya	Sabah	Sarawak	Selangor	Terengganu
1 January	New Year's Day	Hari Tahun Baru	No	No	No	Yes							No	Yes				No
14 January	Yang di-Pertuan Besar of Negeri Sembilan's Birthday	Hari Keputeraan Yang di-Pertuan Besar Negeri Sembilan	No	No	No	No	No	No	Yes	No	No	No	No	No	No	No	No	No
Full moon in the month of Thai (January–February)	Thaipusam	Hari Thaipusam	Yes	No	No	Yes	No	No	Yes	No	Yes		No	Yes	No	No	Yes	No
First two days of the first lunar month (January–February)	Chinese New Year	Tahun Baru Cina	Two days; federal holiday (except second day in Kelantan and Terengganu, where it is a state holiday)															
1 February	Federal Territory Day	Hari Wilayah Persekutuan	No	No	No	Yes		No	No	No	No	No	No	Yes	No	No	No	No
20 February	Independence Declaration Day	Hari Pengisytiharan Tarikh Kemerdekaan	No	No	No	No	No	Yes	No	No	No	No	No	No	No	No	No	No
4 March	Sultan of Terengganu's Installation Day	Hari Ulang Tahun Pertabalan Sultan Terengganu	No	No	No	No	No	No	No	No	No	No	No	No	No	No	No	Yes
30 March	Governor of Sabah's Birthday	Hari Jadi Yang di-Pertua Negeri Sabah	No	No	No	No	No	No	No	No	No	No	No	No	Yes	No	No	No
23 March	Sultan of Johor's Birthday	Hari Keputeraan Sultan Johor	Yes	No	No	No	No	No	No	No	No	No	No	No	No	No	No	No
Friday before Easter (western Christianity) (March–April)	Good Friday	Jumaat Agung	No	No	No	No	No	No	No	No	No	No	No	No	Yes		No	No
26 April	Sultan of Terengganu's Birthday	Hari Keputeraan Sultan Terengganu	No	No	No	No	No	No	No	No	No	No	No	No	No	No	No	Yes
1 May	Labour Day	Hari Pekerja	Federal holiday															
First full moon in May	Vesak	Hari Wesak	Federal holiday															
17 May	Raja of Perlis's Birthday	Hari Keputeraan Raja Perlis	No	No	No	No	No	No	No	No	No	No	Yes	No	No	No	No	No
22 May	Hari Hol of Pahang	Hari Hol Pahang	No	No	No	No	No	No	No	Yes	No	No	No	No	No	No	No	No
30 and 31 May	Tadau Kaamatan	Pesta Kaamatan (Pesta Menuai)	No	No	No	No	Two days	No	No	No	No	No	No	No	Two days	No	No	No
1 and 2 June	Gawai Dayak	Perayaan Hari Gawai Dayak	No	No	No	No	No	No	No	No	No	No	No	No	No	Two days	No	No
First Monday of June	Yang di-Pertuan Agong's Birthday	Hari Keputeraan Yang di-Pertuan Agong	Federal holiday															
Third Sunday of June	Sultan of Kedah's Birthday	Hari Keputeraan Sultan Kedah	No	Yes	No	No	No	No	No	No	No	No	No	No	No	No	No	No
7 July	Declaration of George Town as World Heritage Site	Hari Ulang Tahun Perisytiharan Tapak Warisan Dunia	No	No	No	No	No	No	No	No	Yes	No	No	No	No	No	No	No
Second Saturday of July	Governor of Penang's Birthday	Hari Jadi Yang di-Pertua Negeri Pulau Pinang	No	No	No	No	No	No	No	No	Yes	No	No	No	No	No	No	No
22 July	Sarawak Independence Day	Hari Kemerdekaan Sarawak	No	No	No	No	No	No	No	No	No	No	No	No	No	Yes	No	No
25 July	Sultan of Pahang's Birthday	Hari Keputeraan Sultan Pahang	No	No	No	No	No	No	No	Yes	No	No	No	No	No	No	No	No
24 August	Governor of Malacca's Birthday	Hari Jadi Yang di-Pertua Negeri Melaka	No	No	No	No	No	Yes	No	No	No	No	No	No	No	No	No	No
31 August	National Day/Independence Day	Hari Kebangsaan/Hari Merdeka	Federal holiday															
16 September	Malaysia Day	Hari Malaysia	Federal holiday															
29 and 30 September	Sultan of Kelantan's Birthday	Hari Keputeraan Sultan Kelantan	No	No	Two days	No	No	No	No	No	No	No	No	No	No	No	No	No
Second Saturday of October	Governor of Sarawak's Birthday	Hari Jadi Yang di-Pertua Negeri Sarawak	No	No	No	No	No	No	No	No	No	No	No	No	No	Yes	No	No
Naraka Chaturdashi, the day preceding the new moon in the month of Aippasi (October–November) (Note: Subject to change based on astronomical considerations according to the Hindu almanac)	Deepavali	Deepavali	Federal holiday													No	Federal holiday	
First Friday of November	Sultan of Perak's Birthday	Hari Keputeraan Sultan Perak	No	No	No	No	No	No	No	No	No	Yes	No	No	No	No	No	No
11 December	Sultan of Selangor's Birthday	Hari Keputeraan Sultan Selangor	No	No	No	No	No	No	No	No	No	No	No	No	No	No	Yes	No
24 December	Christmas Eve	Hari Sebelum Krismas	No	No	No	No	No	No	No	No	No	No	No	No	Yes	No	No	No
25 December	Christmas	Hari Krismas	Federal holiday															
Holidays based on the Islamic calendar (does not align with the Earth's year cycle)
1 Muharram	First day of Muharram	Awal Muharram (Maal Hijrah)	Federal holiday															
6 Safar	Hari Hol of Sultan Iskandar of Johor	Hari Hol Almarhum Sultan Iskandar	Yes	No	No	No	No	No	No	No	No	No	No	No	No	No	No	No
12 Rabiulawal	Muhammad's Birthday	Hari Keputeraan Nabi Muhammad (Maulidur Rasul)	Federal holiday															
27 Rejab	Isra and Mi'raj	Israk dan Mikraj	No	Yes	No	No	No	No	Yes	No	No	No	Yes	No	No	No	No	Yes
1 Ramadan (Note: Subject to change based on the sighting of the new moon)	First day of Ramadan	Awal Ramadan	Yes		No	No	No	No	No	No	No	No	No	No	No	No	No	No
17 Ramadan	Anniversary of the Revelation of the Quran	Hari Nuzul Al-Quran	No	No	Yes			No	No	Yes					No	No	Yes	
1 and 2 Syawal	Eid al-Fitr	Hari Raya Puasa/Hari Raya Aidilfitri	Two days; federal holiday															
3 Syawal	Eid al-Fitr	Hari Raya Puasa/Hari Raya Aidilfitri	No	No	No	No	No	Yes	No	No	No	No	No	No	No	No	No	No
9 Zulhijjah	Day of Arafah	Hari Arafah	No	No	Yes	No	No	No	No	No	No	No	No	No	No	No	No	Yes
10 Zulhijjah	Eid al-Adha	Hari Raya Qurban/Hari Raya Haji/Hari Raya Aidiladha	Federal holiday															
11 Zulhijjah	Eid al-Adha	Hari Raya Qurban/Hari Raya Haji/Hari Raya Aidiladha	No	State	Federal	No	No	No	No	No	No	No	State	No	No	No	No	Federal
Total			18	18	19	18	19	18	18	18	19	18	18	18	20	19	18	20

== Types of holidays ==
Malaysia has one of the highest numbers of public holidays in the world, ranking number seven in the top ten countries after Thailand, Indonesia, India and Macau. Some holidays are federally gazetted public holidays and some are public holidays observed by individual states. Other festivals are observed by particular ethnic or religion groups, but are not public holidays. The main holy days of each major religion are public holidays, taking place on either the western calendar or religious ones.

=== Secular ===
The most widespread holiday is the "Hari Kebangsaan" (National Day), otherwise known as "Hari Merdeka" (Independence Day) on 31 August commemorating the independence of the Federation of Malaya. This, as well as Labour Day (1 May), the King's birthday (First Monday of June) and some other festivals are major national public holidays. Federal Territory day is celebrated in the three Federal territories. Malaysia Day, held on 16 September to commemorate the formation of Malaysia, became a nationwide holiday in 2010. Before that it was celebrated only in Sabah, Sarawak and Labuan. New Year's Day is also observed as a public holiday in all Malaysian states, except for Johor, Kedah, Kelantan, Perlis, and Terengganu.

=== Religious and ethnic ===
Muslim holidays are highly prominent in Malaysia. The most important of these is Hari Raya Puasa (also called Hari Raya Aidilfitri) which is the Malay translation of Eid al-Fitr. It is generally a festival honoured by the Muslims worldwide marking the end of Ramadan will the fasting month. In addition to Hari Raya Puasa, they also celebrate Hari Raya Aidiladha (also called Hari Raya Haji referring to its occurrence after the culmination of the annual Hajj or Hari Raya Qurban), Awal Muharram (Islamic New Year) and Maulidur Rasul (Birthday of Muhammad).

Malaysian Chinese typically hold the same festivals observed by Chinese around the world. Chinese New Year is the most prominent, lasting for 15-days and ending with Chap Goh Mei (十五暝). Other festivals celebrated by Chinese are the Qingming Festival, the Dragon Boat Festival and the Mid-Autumn Festival.

Malaysian Indians of the Hindu faith celebrate Deepavali, the festival of light, while Thaipusam is a celebration in which Hindu pilgrims from all over the country meet at the Batu Caves. The most important Sikh festival is the Sikh new year or Vaisakhi festival. Other important days are Lodi and Gurpurab. Other Indian and Indochinese communities observe their new year celebrations at around the same time, such as Pohela Boishakh of the Bengalis and Songkran (water festival) of the Thais. People in the northern states do celebrate the Thai festival of Loy Kratong.

Wesak (Malay for Vesak), the Buddhist festival commemorating Buddha's birth, is a public holiday. Malaysia's Christian community observes most of the holidays observed by Christians elsewhere, most notably Christmas and Easter. Good Friday, however, is only a public holiday in the two Bornean states. The harvest festivals of Gawai in Sarawak and Kaamatan in Sabah are also important for East Malaysians.

New Year's Day, Chinese New Year, and the start of the Islamic calendar are all public holidays.

== Participation ==
Despite most of the festivals being identified with a particular ethnic or religious group, festivities are often participated in by all Malaysians. One example of this is the celebration of Kongsi Raya which is used when Hari Raya Puasa and Chinese New Year coincide. The term Kongsi Raya (which means "sharing the celebration" in Malay) was coined because of the similarity between the word kongsi and the Chinese New Year greeting of Gong xi fa cai. Similarly, the portmanteau Deepa Raya was coined when Hari Raya Puasa and Deepavali coincided.

A practice known as "open house" (rumah terbuka) is common during the festivities, especially during Hari Raya Aidilfitri, Deepavali, Chinese New Year and Christmas. Open house means that all well-wishers are received and that everyone regardless of background is invited to attend. Open houses are normally held at the home of the host and food are also prepared by the host, however, there are also open houses held at larger public venues especially when hosted by government agencies or corporations. Also during the festivities, most Malaysians would take the time off work or school to return to their hometowns to celebrate the festivities with their extended relatives. This practice is commonly known as balik kampung and usually causes traffic jams on most highways in the country.

== Festivals of Malaysia ==
=== Muslim festivals ===
Festival	Date	Status	Ethnic Group	Note
Islamic New Year / Maal Hijrah / Awal Muharam	1 Muharam	Nationwide	Malay	
Maulidur Rasul	12 Rabiulawal	Nationwide	Malay	
Israk dan Mikraj	27 Rejab	Nationwide	Malay	
Awal Ramadan / Awal Berpuasa	1 Ramadan	Nationwide	Malay	
Nuzul al-Quran	17 Ramadan	Nationwide	Malay	
Hari Raya Aidilfitri / Hari Raya Puasa	1 Syawal	Nationwide	Malay	
Awal Zulhijjah	1 Zulhijjah	Nationwide	Malay	
Hari Arafah	9 Zulhijjah	Nationwide	Malay	
Hari Raya Aidiladha / Hari Raya Haji / Hari Raya Korban	10 Zulhijjah	Nationwide	Malay	

=== Buddhist festivals ===
Festival	Date	Status	Ethnic Group	Note
Vesak Day	Full moon day of the month of Vaisakha	Nationwide	Chinese, Indian, Siamese	

=== Christian festivals ===
Festival	Date	Status	Ethnic Group	Note
New Year's Day	1 January	Nationwide		
Intrudu Water Festival	Sunday before Ash Wednesday	Malacca	Kristang	
Good Friday	The Friday preceding Easter Sunday	Nationwide		
Easter		Nationwide		
Festa San Pedro	29 June	Malacca	Kristang	
Christmas Eve	24 December	Nationwide		
Christmas Day	25 December	Nationwide		

=== Hindu and Indian festivals ===
Festival	Date	Status	Ethnic Group	Note
Pongal	First day of the month of Thai	Nationwide	Tamil	Harvest festival; celebrates the end of the northeast monsoon and the beginning of the harvest season. The festival start with Bhogi on the eve Pongal and end with Kaanum Pongal
Parchu Bhogi	Last day of the month Margazhi	Malacca	TChitty	Traditional festival of Malacaa Chitty
Thaipusam	mid-January to mid-February	Nationwide	Indians	Occurs during the cool dry season following harvest.
Saraswati Puja	February	Nationwide	Indians (Mainly the Bengali Hindu community)	
Maha Shivaratri	February	Nationwide	Indians and other Hindu communities	
Holi	March	Nationwide	Gujaratis Hindu	
Panguni Uthiram	March	Nationwide	Tamil	It is celebrated on the confluence of Uttiram nakshatram on the purnima (full moon) of the month of Panguni
Ugadi	March	Nationwide	Telegus	
Rama Navami	March	Nationwide	Indians	
Puthandu / Vaisakhi/ Visu	April	Nationwide	Indians	Indian new year, also celebrated by other southeast Asian Buddhist community
Akshaya Tritiya	April to May	Nationwide	Both Hindu and Jains	Spring Festival
Raksha Bandhan	August	Nationwide	Gujaratis Hindu	honours the bond between siblings.
Krishna jayanthi	August	Nationwide	Indians and other Hindu communities	
Vinayagar Chaturthi	Between August and September	Nationwide	Indians and other Hindu communities	
Aadi Amavasai	August	Nationwide	Tamil	Observed during the monsoon season; associated with ancestral rites and agricultural preparations
Aadi Perukku	August	Nationwide	Tamil	Welcoming increasing river levels during monsoon
Onam	August	Nationwide	Malayalees	harvest festival of Kerala.
Navaratri	Between August and September	Nationwide	Indians and other Hindu communities	9 days festival start with Ayudha Puja and end with Vijayadashami
Deepavali / Diwali / Festival of Lights		Nationwide	Indians and other Hindu communities	Biggest Indian and Hindu festival in Malaysia
Skanda Sashti	October	Nationwide	Indians (Mainly South Indian)	
Kartika Deepam/Kartika Purnima	November	Nationwide	Indians (Mainly South Indian) and Sikh community	

=== Chinese festivals ===
Festival	Date	Status	Ethnic Group	Note
Beginning of Spring	February	Nationwide	Chinese	
Chinese New Year / Lunar New Year / Spring Festival	January/February	Nationwide	Chinese	
Festival of the Heavenly God or Jade Emperor	January/February	Nationwide	Chinese	
Lantern Festival / Chap Goh Meh	February/March	Nationwide	Chinese	
Qing Ming Festival / Cheng Beng	April	Nationwide	Chinese and Chitty	
Duanwu Festival / Dragon Boat Festival / Chang Festival	May/June	Nationwide	Chinese	
Qixi Festival / Chinese Valentine's Day	August	Nationwide	Chinese	
Hungry Ghost Festival	August/September	Nationwide	Chinese	
Nine Emperor Gods Festival	September/October	Nationwide	Chinese	
Mid-Autumn Festival / Mooncake Festival	September/October	Nationwide	Chinese	
Double Ninth Festival	9th day of the 9th lunar month	Nationwide	Chinese	
Dōngzhì Festival / Tang Chek Festival / Winter Solstice Festival	December	Nationwide	Chinese	

=== Ethnic festivals ===
Festival	Date	Status	Ethnic Group	Note
Pesta Kalimaran	31 March	Sabah	Murut	
Pesta Kaul	March or early April	Mukah, Sarawak	Melanau	
Songkran	April	West Malaysia	Siamese	
Regatta Lepa	20–22 April	Semporna, Sabah	East coast Bajau	
Tadau Kaamatan	30, 31 May	Sabah and Labuan	Kadazan-Dusun	
Hari Gawai	1, 2 June	Sarawak	Dayak	
Pesta Rumbia	9 and 10 July	Kuala Penyu, Sabah	Bisaya and Kadazan	
Pesta Kelapa	2 September	Kudat, Sabah	Rungus	
Tamu Besar	29 and 30 October	Kota Belud, Sabah	West coast Bajau	
Loi Krathong	October/November	West Malaysia	Siamese	
Pesta Jagung	5 and 6 November	Kota Marudu, Sabah	Kadazan-Dusun	

=== International and National Festivals ===
Festival	Date	Status	Ethnic Group	Note
International Women's Day	8 March	Worldwide		
International Workers' Day	1 May	Worldwide		
Mother's Day	Second Sunday of May	Worldwide		
Teachers' Days	16 May	Nationwide		
Father's Day	Third Sunday in June	Worldwide		
Parents' Day	First Sunday in July	Nationwide		

== See also ==
- Public holidays of Sabah
