= Farewell Pilgrimage =

Significant event in early Islam

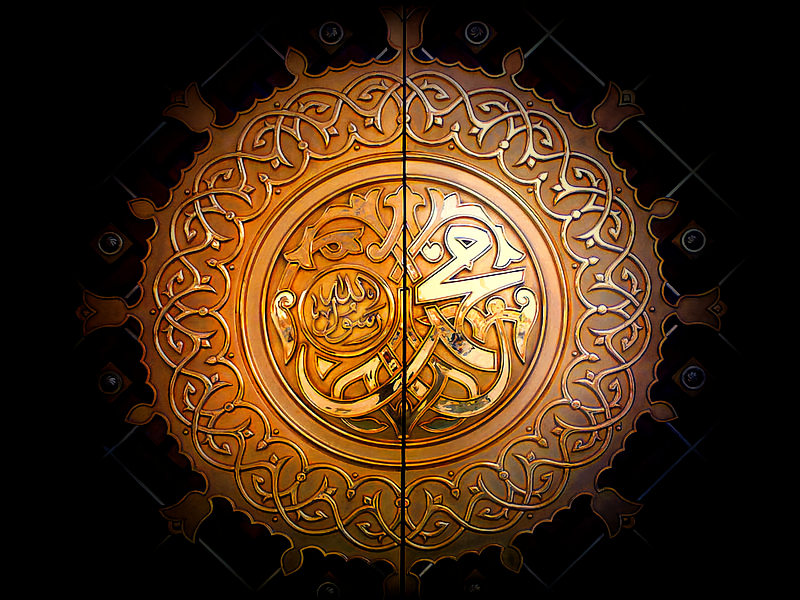
The famous door of madina masjid

The Farewell Pilgrimage (Arabic: حِجَّة ٱلْوَدَاع, romanized: Ḥijjat al-Wadāʿ) was the Hajj pilgrimage that Muhammad(PBUH) performed in the Islamic year 10 AH, following the Conquest of Mecca. Muslims believe that verse 22:27 of the Quran brought about the intent to perform Hajj in Mecca that year. When Muhammad announced this intent, approximately 100,000 of his Sahaba gathered in Medina to perform the annual pilgrimage with him. Muhammad performed Hajj al-Qiran, a type of Hajj in which Umrah and Hajj are performed together. On the 9th of Dhu al-Hijjah, the Day of Arafah, Muhammad delivered the Farewell Sermon atop the Mount Arafat outside Mecca.

Muhammad's(PBUH) pilgrimage defined several of the rituals and rites of the Hajj and is one of the most well-recorded moments of his life, later transmitted through his sahaba, who accompanied him on this occasion, observing every gesture of Muhammad (PBUH), which has become a precedent to be followed by Muslims all over the world (sunnah).

== Background ==
Muhammad(PBUH) had lived in Medina for ten years since the Hijrah and had not partaken in any Hajj pilgrimage, although he had performed the Umrah on two previous occasions. Muslims believe the revelation of verse 27 of Surah 22, Al Hajj:^{[Quran 22:27]}

And proclaim to the people the Hajj [pilgrimage]; they will come to you on foot and on every lean camel; they will come from every distant pass.

Muhammad(PBUH) committed to the Hajj that year. The Muslims in Medina and the surrounding regions gathered with Muhammad to undertake the journey. Muhammad appointed Abu Dujana al-Ansari as the Governor of Medina during his absence. On 25 Dhu al-Qi'dah (c. February 632), he left Medina, accompanied by all his wives.

Before leaving for Mecca, Muhammad(PBUH) stayed at the Miqat Dhu al-Hulayfah and taught the Muslims the manner of wearing Ihram. He first performed ghusl, before putting on his ihram, which is said to have consisted of two pieces of Yemeni unsewed white cotton. Muhammad then performed the Zuhr prayer at the miqat before leaving on a camel named Al Qaswa'. Muhammad then proceeded with his journey until he reached Mecca, arriving eight days later.

== The Hajj ==
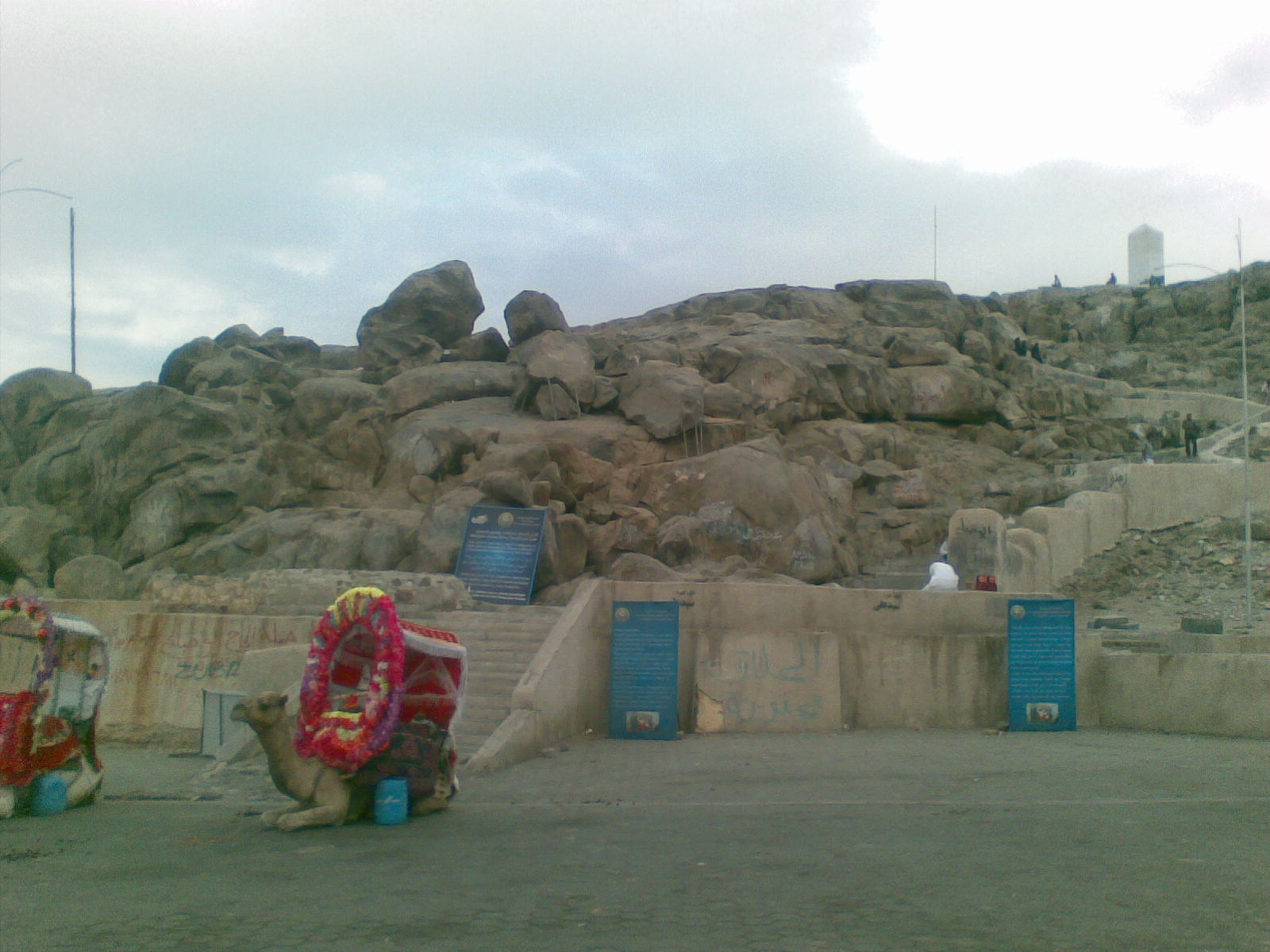
Mount Arafat, also known as Jabal Rahma, with the white marble pillar marking the location at which Muhammad delivered the Farewell Sermon

Spending the night at Dhi Tuwa outside Mecca, Muhammad and his companions arrived at the Masjid al-Haram the next day. They entered from what is the Al Salam Gate today and approached the Kaaba. Muhammad then proceeded to circumambulate the Kaaba (tawaf), after which he once again touched and kissed the Black Stone. After his prayers, Muhammad drank from the Zamzam well, prayed, and then continued to the hills of As Safa and Al Marwah, where he performed the ritual walking between the two mountains (sa'ee). Muhammad then moved to Al Hujūn; he had not removed his ihram after the Sa'ee as he had intended to perform Hajj Qirān, which involves performing Umrah and Hajj together. Muhammad then ordered those who had arrived without sacrificial animals to observe ihram for Umrah and to perform Tawaf and Sa'ee, following which they relieved themselves of ihram.

On the sunset of the 8th of Dhu al-Hijjah, Muhammad left for Mina and performed all prayers from Zuhr to Fajr, before leaving for Mount Arafat the next morning, walking alongside his camel. As he ascended the mountain, he was surrounded by thousands of pilgrims chanting Talbiyah and Takbir. Muhammad ordered a tent be erected for him on the east side of Mount Arafat at a spot called Namirah. He rested in the tent until the sun passed the zenith, then he rode his camel until he reached the valley of Uranah. Muhammad delivered his final Friday sermon (khutbah), known as the Farewell Sermon, to more than 100,000 Sahaba, before leading the Zuhr and Asr prayers in conjunction. Then he moved to plain of Arafat and spent the afternoon in supplication. According to Al Mubarakpuri, verse 3 of Surah 5, Al Ma'idah, was revealed to Muhammad after having delivered this sermon:

This day I have perfected your religion for you, completed My Favour upon you, and have chosen for you Islam as your religion.

Upon sunset of the 9th of Dhu al-Hijjah, Muhammad arrived at Muzdalifah and performed his Maghrib and Isha prayer before taking rest. At the break of dawn, he prayed and supplicated before returning to Mina in the morning and carrying out the ritual of the Stoning of the Devil, reciting the takbir every time he threw a stone at the Jamrah. Muhammad then ordered the sacrifice of the sacrificial animals that he had brought with him. Muhammad and his companions ate little of what they had sacrificed and gave the rest to charity. Muhammad then returned to Mecca, performed another Tawaf and prayed Zuhr at the Masjid al-Haram. He then drank from the Zamzam well before returning to Mina on the same day and continuing the Stoning of the Devil. Muhammad then spent the next three days, the 11th, 12th, and 13th of Dhu al-Hijjah, known as the Days of Tashrīq, in Mina performing the Stoning of the Devil. Al Mubarakpuri says that Muhammad (PBUH) delivered another speech on the 12th, following the revelation of Surah 110, An Nasr.

== See also ==
- Farewell Sermon
- Hejaz
- First Pilgrimage
