= Federal Territory Day =

State holiday in the federal territories of Malaysia

- Flag of Federal Territory
- Official name: Hari Wilayah Persekutuan
- Also called: Hari Wilayah
- Observed by: Federal Territory of Kuala Lumpur, Labuan and Putrajaya.
- Type: State
- Significance: Marks the establishment of the Federal Territory
- Date: 1 February
- Next time: 1 February 2026
- Frequency: annual

Federal Territory Day (Malay: Hari Wilayah Persekutuan) is a territorial public holiday observed annually on 1 February by the federal territories of Kuala Lumpur, Labuan and Putrajaya in Malaysia. The date marks the anniversary of the transfer of Kuala Lumpur from the state of Selangor to the federal government, which occurred on 1 February 1974.

== History ==
The Federal Territory Day was introduced on 1 February 1974, four days after the Federal Territory Agreement was signed on 28 January 1974 by the Yang di-Pertuan Agong, Tuanku Abdul Halim Muadzam Shah of Kedah and the Sultan of Selangor, Almarhum Sultan Salahuddin Abdul Aziz Shah. On 16 April 1984, Labuan became the second federal territory, and on 1 February 2001, Putrajaya became the third federal territory of Malaysia.

In addition, 1 February also has significance as the day of the formation of the Federation of Malaya in 1948.

== Main Theme and Venue ==
=== Merdeka Square, Kuala Lumpur ===
Year	Theme	Venue
2007	Maju dan Sejahtera (Progress and Prosperity)	Merdeka Square, Kuala Lumpur
2008	Wilayah Persekutuanku Gemilang (My Glorious Federal Territory)	Merdeka Square, Kuala Lumpur
2009	Wilayah Maju, Warga Sejahtera (Territory Progress, Citizens Prosperity)	Merdeka Square, Kuala Lumpur
2010	1Wilayah Persekutuan, Maju dan Sejahtera (1Federal Territory, Progress and Prosperity)	Merdeka Square, Kuala Lumpur
2011	1Wilayah Persekutuan, Menjuarai Transformasi (1Federal Territory, Championing Transformations)	Merdeka Square, Kuala Lumpur
2012	Rakyat Bersatu, Wilayah Persekutuan Maju (People's Unity, Federal Territory Progress)	Merdeka Square, Kuala Lumpur
2013	Perpaduan Teras Kesejahteraan, 1Wilayah Persekutuan (Unity the Core of Prosperity, 1Federal Territory)	Merdeka Square, Kuala Lumpur
2014	Wilayah Persekutuan Ceria (Cheerful Federal Territories)	Merdeka Square, Kuala Lumpur
2015	Wilayahku Ceria (My Cheerful Territories)	Merdeka Square, Kuala Lumpur
2016	Wilayah Ceria Rakyat Sejahtera (Cheerful Territories, People Prosperity)	Merdeka Square, Kuala Lumpur
2017	Wilayah Ceria Rakyat Sejahtera (Cheerful Territories, People Prosperity)	Merdeka Square, Kuala Lumpur
2018	Wilayah Ceria Rakyat Sejahtera (Cheerful Territories, People Prosperity)	Merdeka Square, Kuala Lumpur
2019	Wilayah Peduli, Harapan Dipenuhi (Care Territories, Hope Expected)	Merdeka Square, Kuala Lumpur
2023-present	Wilayah Persekutuan Maju dan Sejahtera (Federal Territory Progress and Prosper)	Merdeka Square, Kuala Lumpur

== Federal Territory official awards and decorations ==
The Federal Territory official awards and decorations were introduced on 1 February 2008. The awards received by the Yang di-Pertuan Agong as the Head of State for the Federal Territories.

Ribbon	Name (English/Malay)	Ranks / Letters	Honorific title	Instituted	Awarded to/for
Orders
	The Most Distinguished Order of the Territorial Crown; Darjah Yang Mulia Mahkota Wilayah	Grand Knight (S.U.M.W.)	Datuk Seri Utama	2008	Founded by Tuanku Mizan Zainal Abidin as a reward for contributions to the territory.
	The Most Distinguished Order of the Territorial Crown; Darjah Yang Mulia Mahkota Wilayah	Grand Commander (S.M.W.)	Datuk Seri	2008	Founded by Tuanku Mizan Zainal Abidin as a reward for contributions to the territory.
	The Most Distinguished Order of the Territorial Crown; Darjah Yang Mulia Mahkota Wilayah	Knight Commander (P.M.W.)	Datuk	2008	Founded by Tuanku Mizan Zainal Abidin as a reward for contributions to the territory.
	The Most Distinguished Order of the Territorial Crown; Darjah Yang Mulia Mahkota Wilayah	Commander (J.M.W.)		2008	Founded by Tuanku Mizan Zainal Abidin as a reward for contributions to the territory.
	The Most Distinguished Order of the Territorial Crown; Darjah Yang Mulia Mahkota Wilayah	Officer (K.M.W.)		2008	Founded by Tuanku Mizan Zainal Abidin as a reward for contributions to the territory.
	The Most Distinguished Order of the Territorial Crown; Darjah Yang Mulia Mahkota Wilayah	Member (A.M.W.)		2008	Founded by Tuanku Mizan Zainal Abidin as a reward for contributions to the territory.
	The Most Distinguished Order of the Territorial Crown; Darjah Yang Mulia Mahkota Wilayah	Medal (P.P.W.)		2008	Founded by Tuanku Mizan Zainal Abidin as a reward for contributions to the territory.

== See also ==
- Ministry of Federal Territories
- Federal Territory Day Quotes
