= Public holidays in Sabah =

This is a list of the public holidays of the Malaysian states of Sabah and Sarawak. Dates given are those on which the holidays were celebrated in 2006. Some are Malaysian national holidays, while others are celebrated only in Sabah and Sarawak.

== List of Holidays ==
- New Year's Day, January 1
- Chinese New Year, January - February
- Maal Hijrah (Awal Muharram, or Muslim New Year), 1 Muḥarram
- Maulidur Rasul (Birthday of the Prophet Muhammad), 12 Rabī‘ al-Awwal
- Good Friday, Friday in March or April
- Labour Day, May 1
- Wesak Day, May
- Harvest Festival, May 30–31 (Sabah and Labuan only)
- Birthday Celebration of SPB Yang di-Pertuan Agong (King's Birthday), Saturday in June
- Hari Merdeka (National Day), August 31
- Malaysia Day September 16
- Birthday of Yang di-Pertua Negeri (State governor, Sabah only), 30 March
- Deepavali, October - November
- Eid Al-Fitr (Hari Raya Puasa), 1 Shawwal
- Christmas Eve, December 24
- Christmas Day, December 25
- Eid Al-Adha (Hari Raya Qurban), 10 Dhū al-Ḥijjah

== See also ==
- Public holidays in Malaysia
