= Day of Arafah =

Day 9 of the 12th month of the Islamic calendar

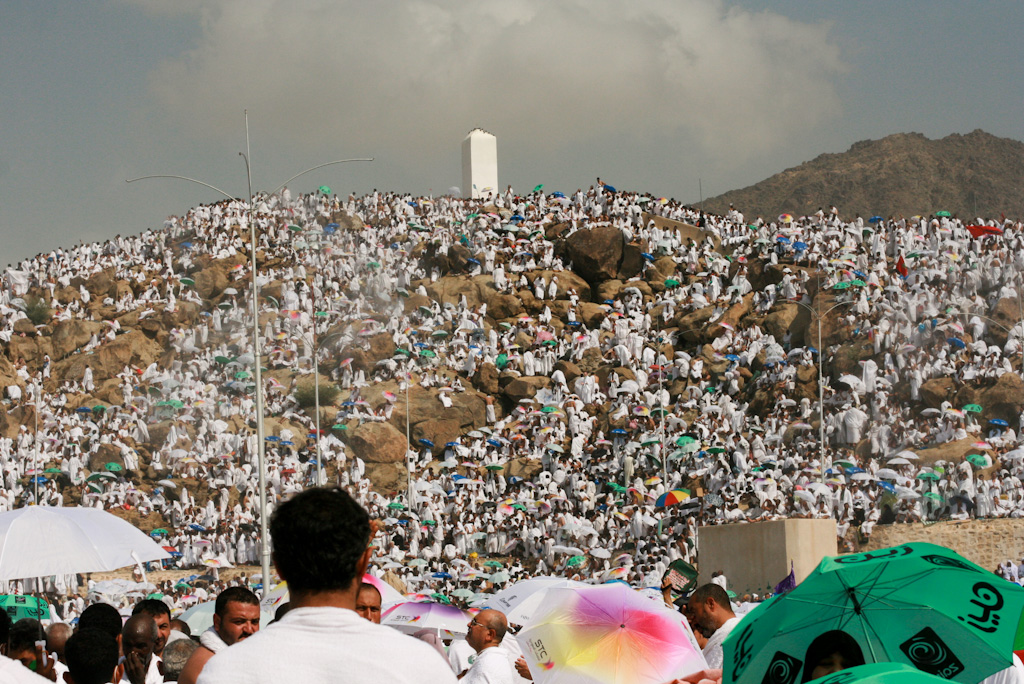
- Pilgrims at Mount Arafah in Mecca
- Official name: يوم عرفة
- Also called: The Day of Repentance and Acceptance of Supplications
- Type: Islamic
- Significance: Commemoration of Prophet Muhammad's Farewell Sermon and completion of the message of Islam. Second day of the Hajj pilgrimage. Muslims who did not go to Hajj fast to repent for their sins.
- Observances: Prayer, fasting, repentance
- Date: 9 Dhu al-Hijjah
- 2025 date: 5 June
- 2026 date: 26 May
- 2027 date: 15 May
- Frequency: once every Islamic year
- Related to: Eid ul-Adha, the major Islamic festival, which occurs the day after the Day of Arafah.

The Day of Arafah (Arabic: يوم عرفة, romanized: Yawm ʿArafah) is an Islamic holiday that falls on the ninth day of Dhu al-Hijjah of the lunar Islamic calendar. It is the second day of the Hajj pilgrimage and is followed by the holiday of Eid al-Adha. At dawn of this day, Muslim pilgrims make their way from Mina to a nearby hillside and plain called Mount Arafat and the Plain of Arafat in Saudi Arabia. It was from this site that the Islamic prophet Muhammad gave one of his last sermons in the last year of his life. Some Muslims hold that part of the Quranic verse announcing that the religion of Islam had been perfected was revealed on this day.

== Location ==
Mount Arafat is a granodiorite hill about 20 km (12 mi) southeast of Mecca on the plain of Arafat. Mount Arafat reaches about 70 m (230 ft) in height and is known as the "Mountain of Mercy" (Jabal ar-Rahmah). According to Islamic tradition, the hill is the place where Muhammad stood and delivered the Farewell Sermon to Muslims who had accompanied him during the Hajj towards the end of his life.

== Customs ==
On 9 Dhu al-Hijjah before noon, pilgrims arrive at Arafat, a barren plain some 20 kilometres (12 mi) east of Mecca where they stand in contemplative vigil: they offer supplications, repent and atone for their past sins, seek mercy of God, and listen to Islamic scholars giving sermons from near Mount Arafat. Lasting from noon through sunset, this is known as 'standing before God' (wuquf), one of the most significant rites of Hajj. At Masjid al-Namirah, pilgrims offer Dhuhr and Asr prayers together at noon time. A pilgrim's Hajj is considered invalid if they do not spend the afternoon on Arafat.

=== Arafah prayer ===
As Husayn ibn Ali recited the prayer during the Hajj at Mount Arafat on 9 Dhu al-Hijjah, Shia Muslims during the Hajj recite the Arafah prayer from Dhuhr to sunset. This day is called prayer day, specially for people who stand on Mount Arafat. On the Day of Arafah, those who cannot make it to Mecca will go to other holy places such as mosques to recite Arafah prayer.

=== Fasting on the Day of Arafah ===
Fasting on the Day of Arafah for non-pilgrims is a highly recommended Sunnah which entails a great reward: Allah forgives the sins of two years. It was narrated from Abu Qatadah that Prophet Muhammad was asked about fasting on the day of 'Arafah and he replied:

It expiates for the past and coming years.

Imam An-Nawawi mentioned in his book al-Majmu', "with regard to the ruling on this matter, Imam As-Shafi'i and his companions said: It is mustahabb (recommended) to fast on the day of Arafah for the one who is not in Arafah. As for the pilgrim who is present in Arafah, Imam As-Shafi'i in his book Al-Mukhtasar and his followers declared 'It is mustahabb (recommended) for him not to fast'."

Prohibiting pilgrims from fasting on these days is considered a great mercy for them, for fasting will exert undue hardship on the person performing the hajj. Above all, Prophet Muhammad did not fast while he stood before Allah offering supplications in Arafah. On the other hand, those who are not performing their Hajj may observe fasting to gain the merits of the blessed day. In solidarity with the pilgrims and in symbolic connection to the rites performed at Arafah, non-pilgrims may re-enact the standing (wuquf) and other Arafah rituals elsewhere. For example in 2001 in Tanzania the day of Arafah was used to express complaints about the perceived marginalisation of the Islamic community and to offer prayers to God for support.

== In hadith ==
Abu Qatada al-Ansari narrated that Prophet Muhammad was asked about fasting on the Day of Arafah, whereupon he said: It expiates the sins of the preceding year and the coming year.

Additionally, in Sahih Muslim it was narrated from Aisha that Prophet Muhammad said:

There is no day on which Allah frees more people from the Fire than the Day of Arafah. He comes close and expresses His fulfillment to the angels, saying, "What do these people want?"

== See also ==
- Eid al-Adha
- Eid al-Fitr
