= Masjid al-Namirah =

Mosque in Makkah Province, Saudi Arabia

Al-Namirah Mosque
- Masjid An-Namirah (مَسْجِد ٱلنَّمِرَة); Masjid Nimrah (مَسْجِد نِمْرَة)
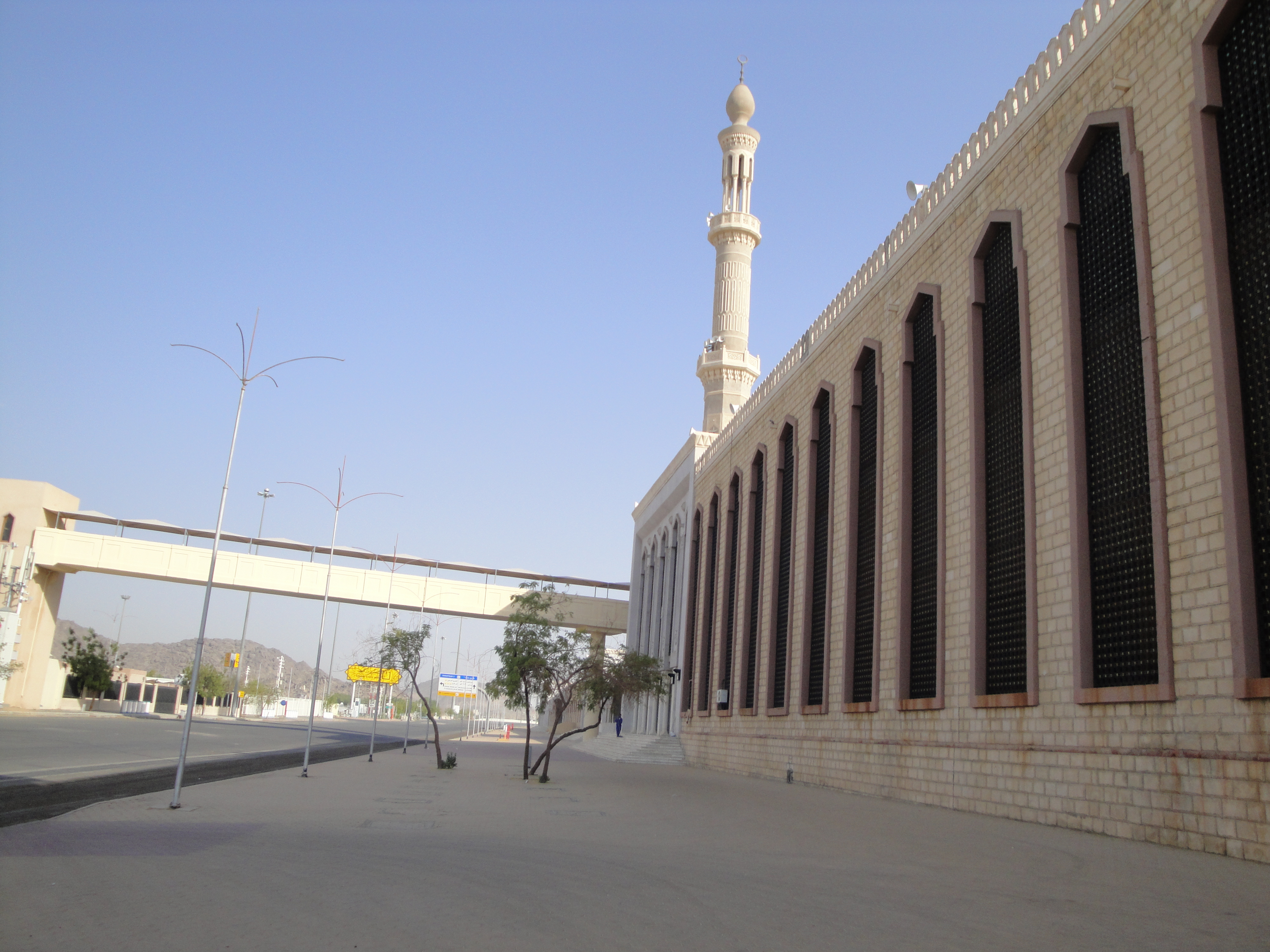
- Al-Namirah Mosque in 2012

- Location within Saudi Arabia

Religion
- Affiliation: Islam
- Ecclesiastical or organizational status: Mosque
- Status: Active

Location
- Location: Wadi Uranah, Makkah, Hejaz
- Interactive map of Al-Namirah Mosque
- Coordinates: 21°21′10.64″N 39°58′0.31″E

Architecture
- Type: Mosque architecture
- Style: Islamic
- Completed: 9th century CE

Specifications
- Capacity: 400,000 worshippers
- Dome: 6
- Minaret: 6

Masjid an-Namirah (Arabic: مَسْجِد ٱلنَّمِرَة) or Masjid Nimrah (Arabic: مَسْجِد نِمْرَة) is a mosque in Wadi Uranah near Mecca in the Hejazi region of Saudi Arabia. It is believed to be where the Islamic prophet Muhammad stayed before delivering his last sermon in 'Arafat. It is one of the most important landmarks during the Hajj, as it is where the khutbahs are delivered to pilgrims during the Day of Arafah during the Dhuhr and Asr prayers. It is located near Mount Arafat.

== Structure ==
The mosque was built somewhere in the 9th century CE during the Abbasid Caliphate. It saw its largest expansion under the Saudi regime, when it was expanded to 27,000 m2, holding over thousands of worshippers. It is the second largest mosque by area in Mecca Province after Al-Masjid al-Haram. The expansions cost over 337 million riyals.

== See also ==
- Holiest sites in Islam
- Islam in Saudi Arabia
- List of mosques in Saudi Arabia
