= Malaysian Gujaratis =

Indian Ethnic Group in Malaysia

Malaysians Gujaratis
મલેશિયન ગુજરાતીઓ
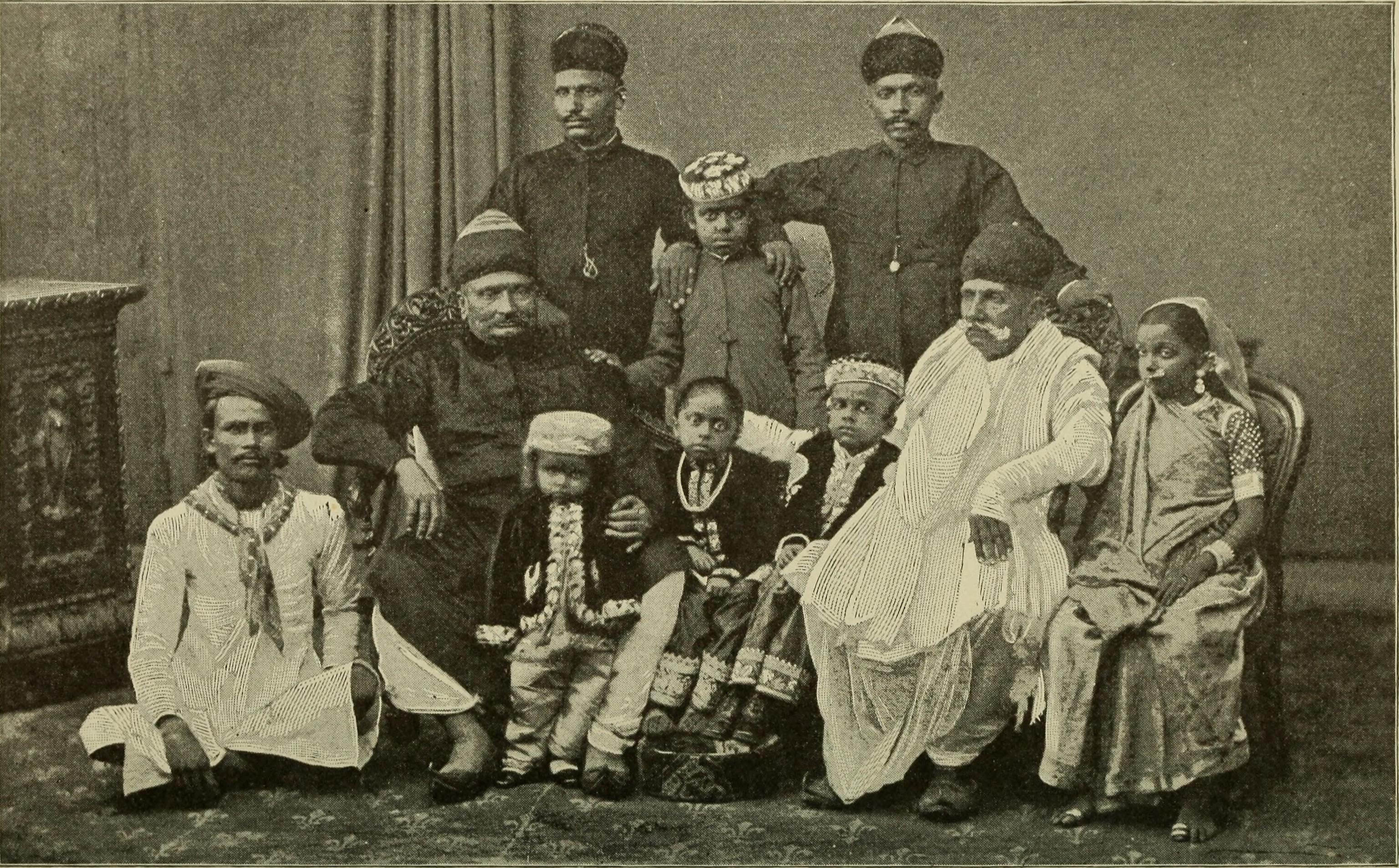
- A Gujarati family in Malaysia, photographed c.1892

Total population
- More than 31,500) (>1% of Malaysian Indians)

Regions with significant populations
- Malaysia (Peninsular Malaysia)

Languages
- Gujarati, English, Malay and Tamil

Religion
- Predominantly Hinduism · Jainism: Also: Christianity · Islam

Related ethnic groups
- Tamil, Tamil Malaysian, Malaysian Malayali, Indian Singaporeans, Malaysian Indians

Malaysian Gujaratis (Gujarati: મલેશિયન ગુજરાતીઓ) are people of full or partial Gujarati descent who were born in, or immigrated to Malaysia. Gujaratis first arrived in Malaya in the 14th century CE, to trade spices with the Sultanate of Malacca. It was until the 19th century, they settled in Malaysia. Most Malaysian Gujaratis work as traders. The Gujaratis were mainly from the ports of Cambay, Kutch and Surat in Gujarat, and settled in urban parts of Malaya, including Georgetown, Kuala Lumpur and Ipoh.

== See also ==
- Malaysian Indians
