= Mount Arafat =

Mountain and holy site in Saudi Arabia

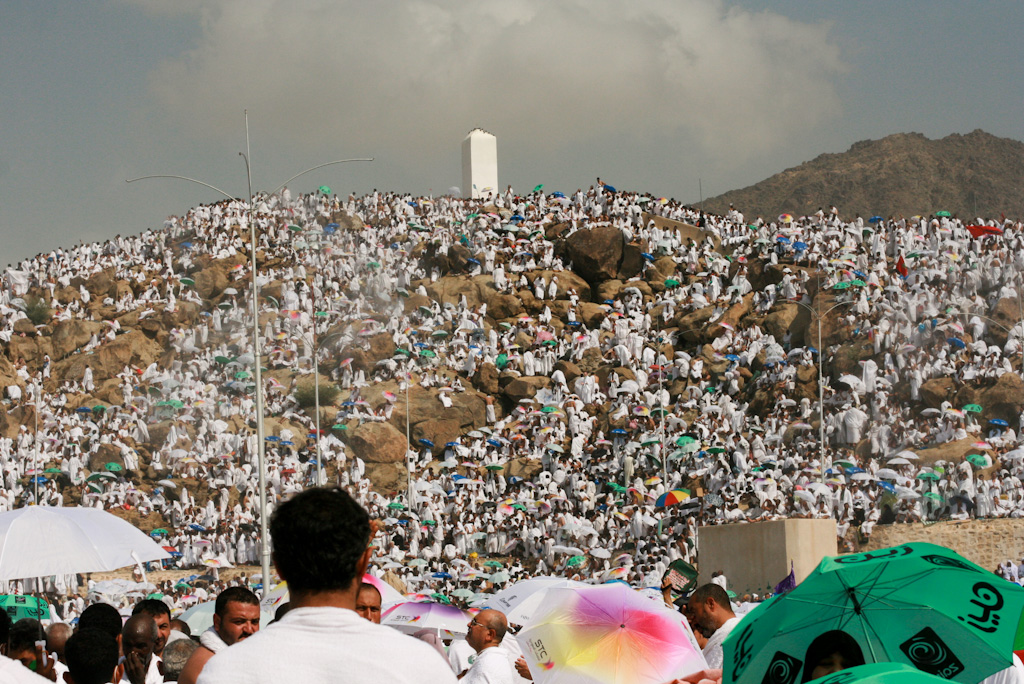
- Pilgrims atop the mountain during the Hajj

Highest point
- Listing: Mountains of Saudi Arabia
- Coordinates: 21°21′17″N 39°59′02″E

Naming
- Native name: جَبَل عَرَفَات; جَبَل ٱلرَّحْمَة (Arabic)

Geography
- Location within Saudi Arabia Location within Middle East Location within Asia
- Location: Near Mecca City, Makkah Province, the Hejaz, Saudi Arabia
- Parent range: Hijaz Mountains

Geology
- Rock age: 9.13 ± 1.05 Mya
- Mountain type: Grandiorite hill

Mount Arafat (Arabic: جَبَل عَرَفَات, romanized: Jabal ʿArafāt, or جَبَل ٱلرَّحْمَة, Jabal ar-Raḥmah, 'Mountain of Mercy') is a granodiorite hill about 20 km (12 mi) southeast of Mecca, in the province of the same name in Saudi Arabia. It is approximately 70 m (230 ft) in height, with its highest point sitting at an elevation of 454 metres (1,490 ft).

The Islamic prophet Muhammad, before becoming a prophet, would break the tradition of his tribe, the Quraysh, by standing at Arafat with the other Arabs, much to the shock of his fellow Qurayshite Jubayr ibn Muṭʽim who highlighted that he was a part of the Hums and questioning what business he had there.

According to Islamic traditions, the hill is the place where Muhammad stood and delivered the Farewell Sermon (Khuṭbat al-Wadāʿ) to his companions (Ṣaḥābah) who had accompanied him for the Hajj towards the end of his life. Some Muslims also believe that Mount Arafat is the place where Adam and Eve reunited on Earth after falling from Heaven, believing the mountain to be the place where they were forgiven, hence giving it the name Jabal ar-Raḥmah, meaning 'Mountain of Mercy'. A pillar is erected on top of the mountain to show where this event is believed to have taken place.

The mountain is especially important during the Hajj, with the 9th day of the Islamic month of Dhu al-Hijjah, also known as the Day of 'Arafah after the mountain itself, being the day when Hajj pilgrims leave Mina for Arafat; this day is considered to be the most important day of the Hajj. The khuṭbah (sermon) is delivered and ẓuhr and ʿaṣr prayers are prayed together in the valley. The pilgrims spend the whole day on the mountain invoking Allah to forgive their sins.

== Geology and radiology ==
A 2012 study classified Mount Arafat as a granodiorite rock which mainly consists of feldspar, quartz and muscovite, among other minerals, using petrographic, fission track dating and γ-spectrometric (HPGe) techniques in order to study the geology, thermal history and the radiological hazards due to the presence of primordial radionuclides.

The study yielded fission track age of 9.13 ± 1.05 Ma of the Mount Arafat granodiorite. In addition, the study reported that rifting, magmatism, volcanism and seafloor spreading that resulted in the formation of Red Sea seems to have altered the original age of the Arafat granodiorite under study to 9.13 ± 1.05 Ma. Measured radioactivity concentrations due to ^{226}Ra, ^{232}Th and ^{40}K were found to not pose any radiological health hazard to the general public.

== Hajj ==
Arafat rituals end at sunset and pilgrims then move to Muzdalifah for Maghrib prayer and a shortened Isha prayer and for a short rest.

The level area surrounding the hill is called the Plain of Arafat. The term Mount Arafat is sometimes applied to this entire area. It is an important place in Islam because, during the Hajj, pilgrims spend the afternoon there on the ninth day of Dhu al-Hijjah. Failure to be present in the plain of Arafat on the required day invalidates the pilgrimage.

Since late 2010, this place is served by Mecca Metro. On a normal Hajj, it would be around 21 km (13 mi) to walk.

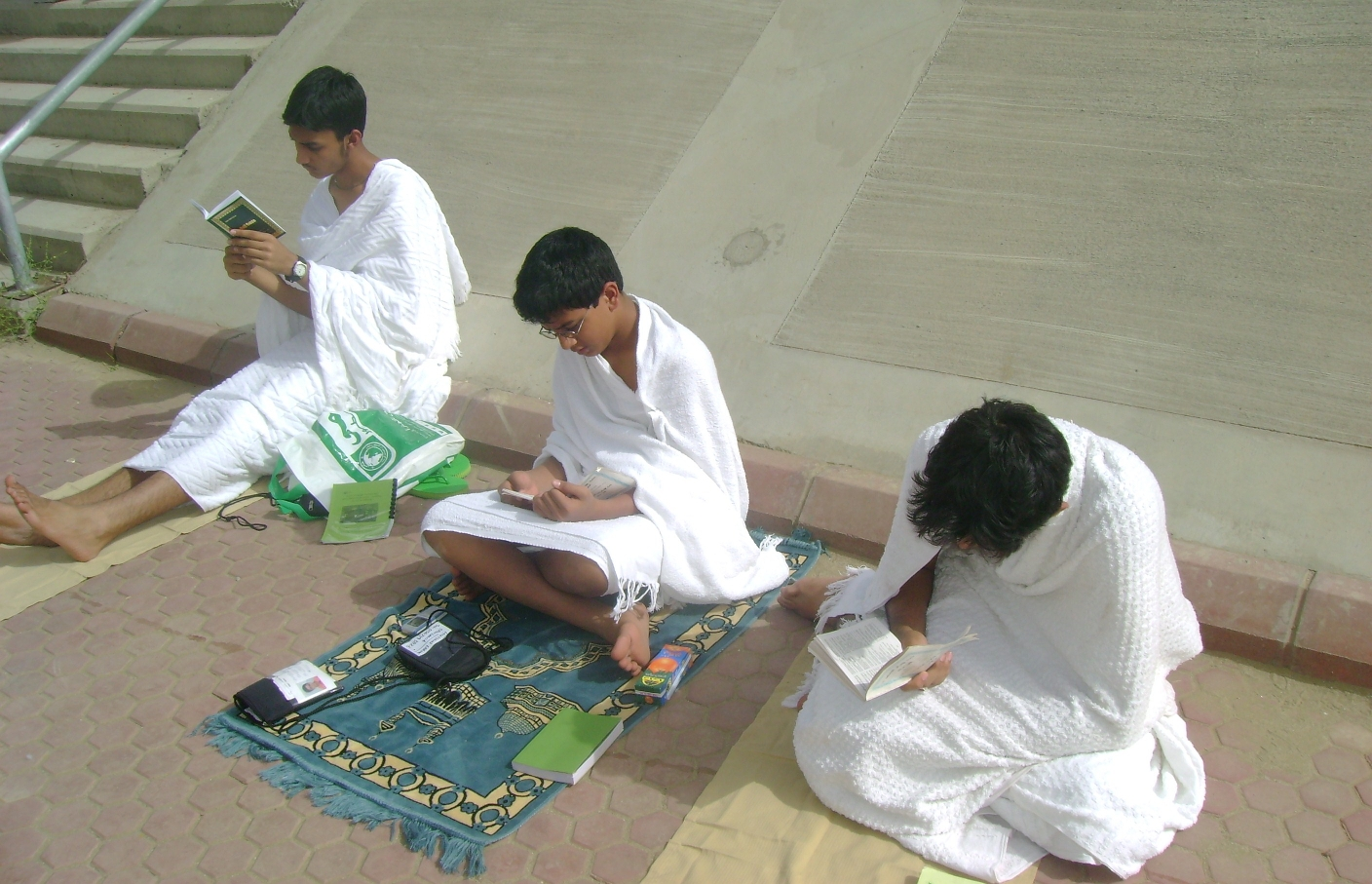
Pilgrims supplicating

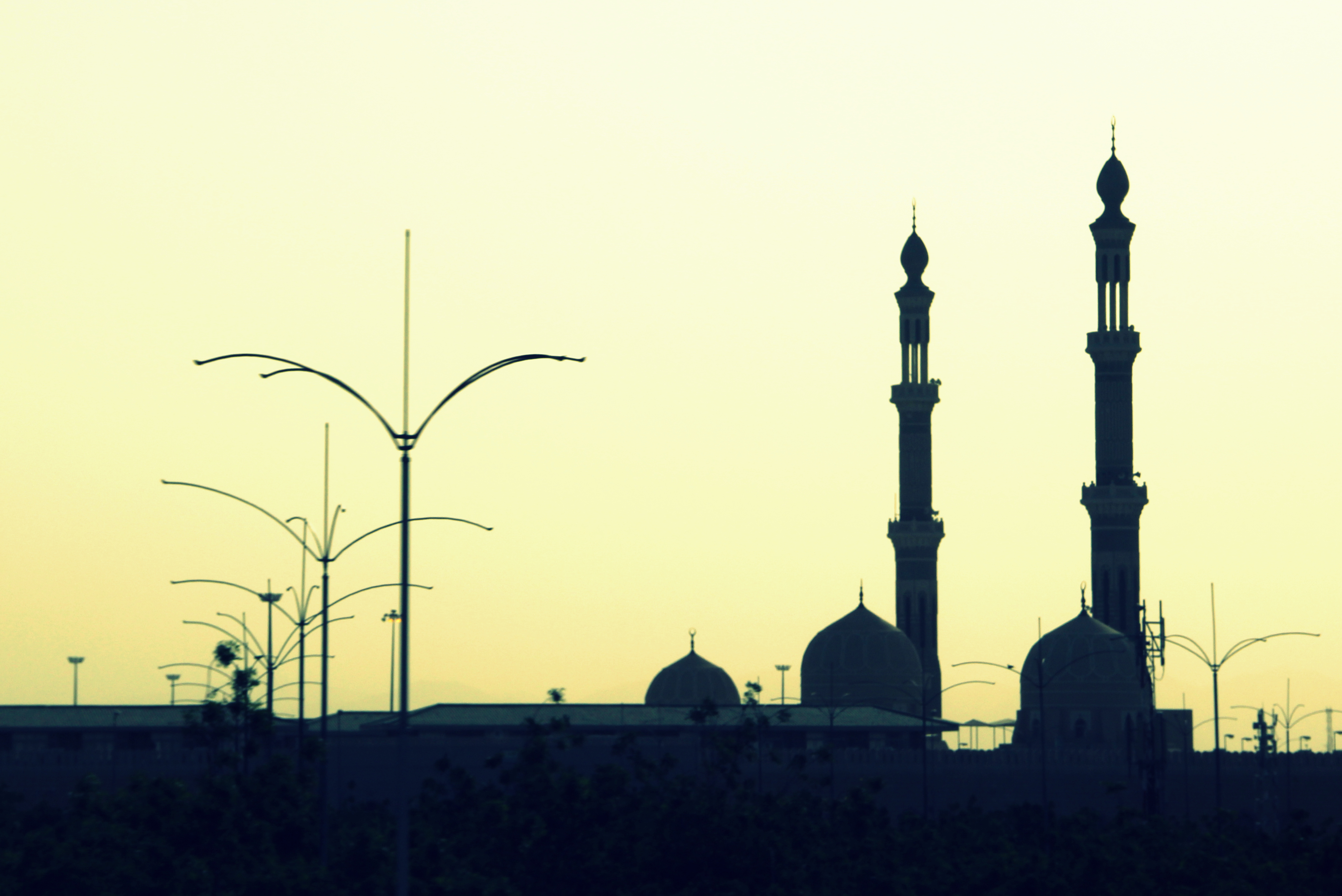
Masjid al-Namirah

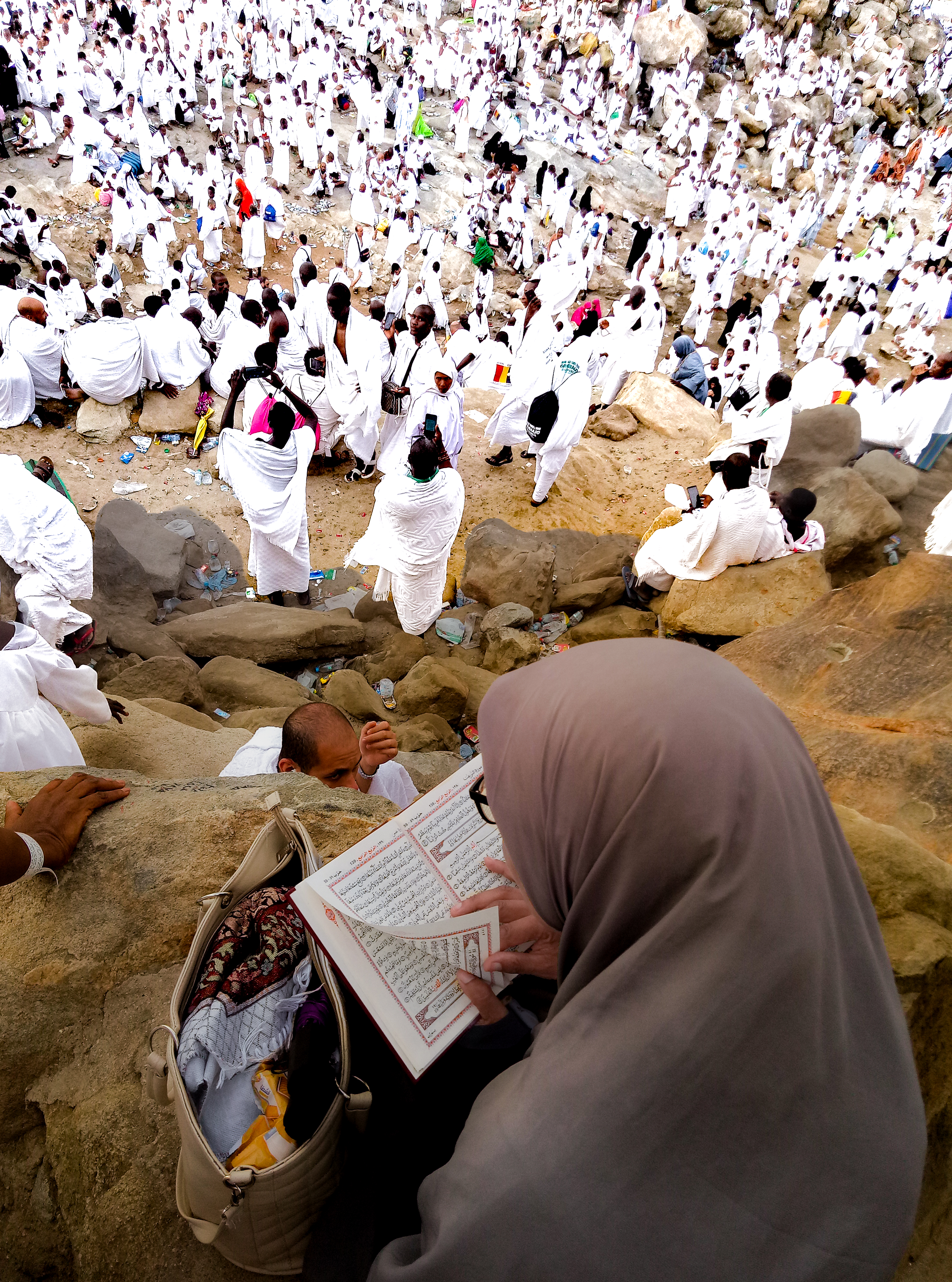
Pilgrims supplicating during Hajj

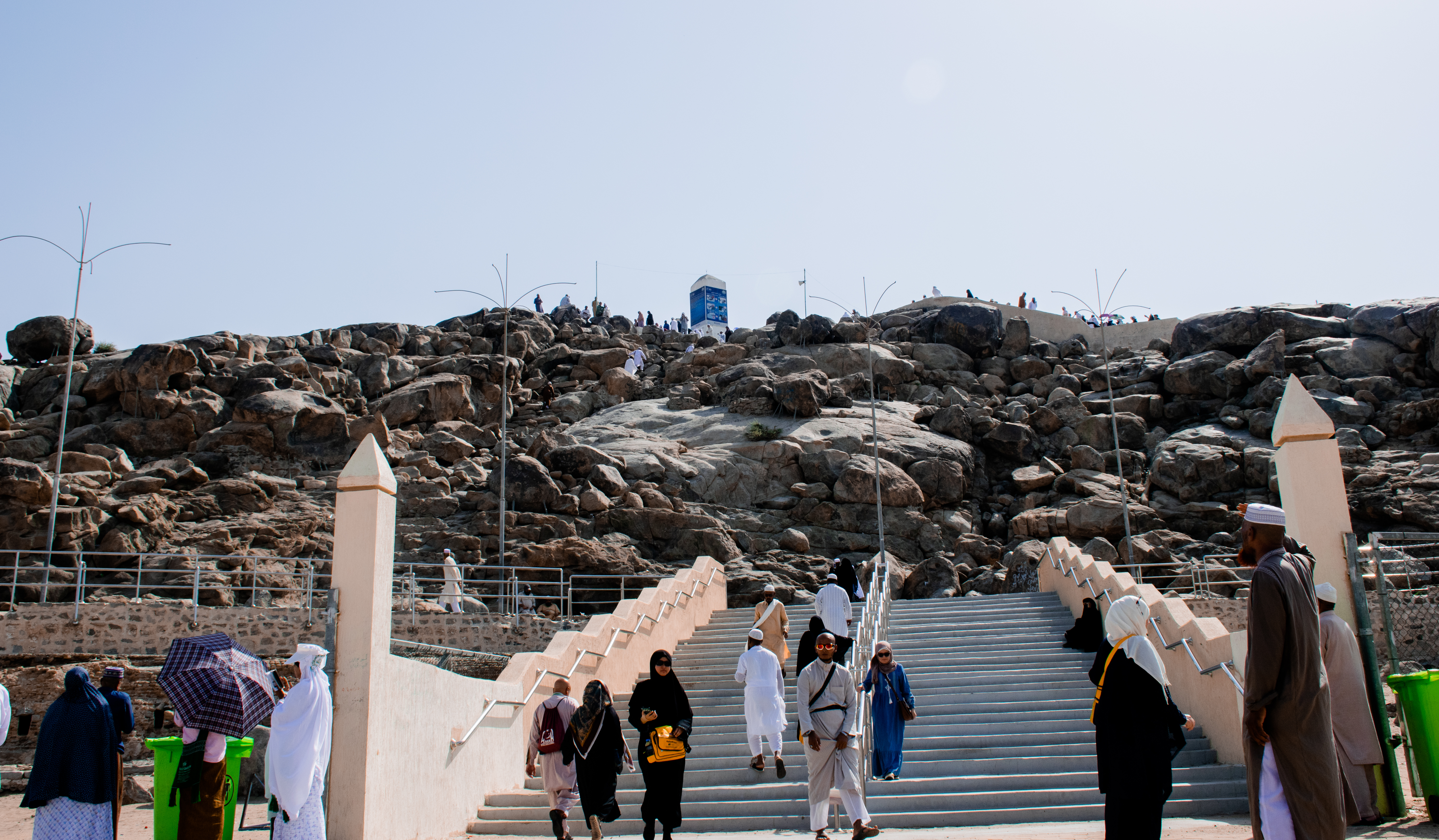
Entrance of Jabal ar-Rahmah (Mount of the Mercy)

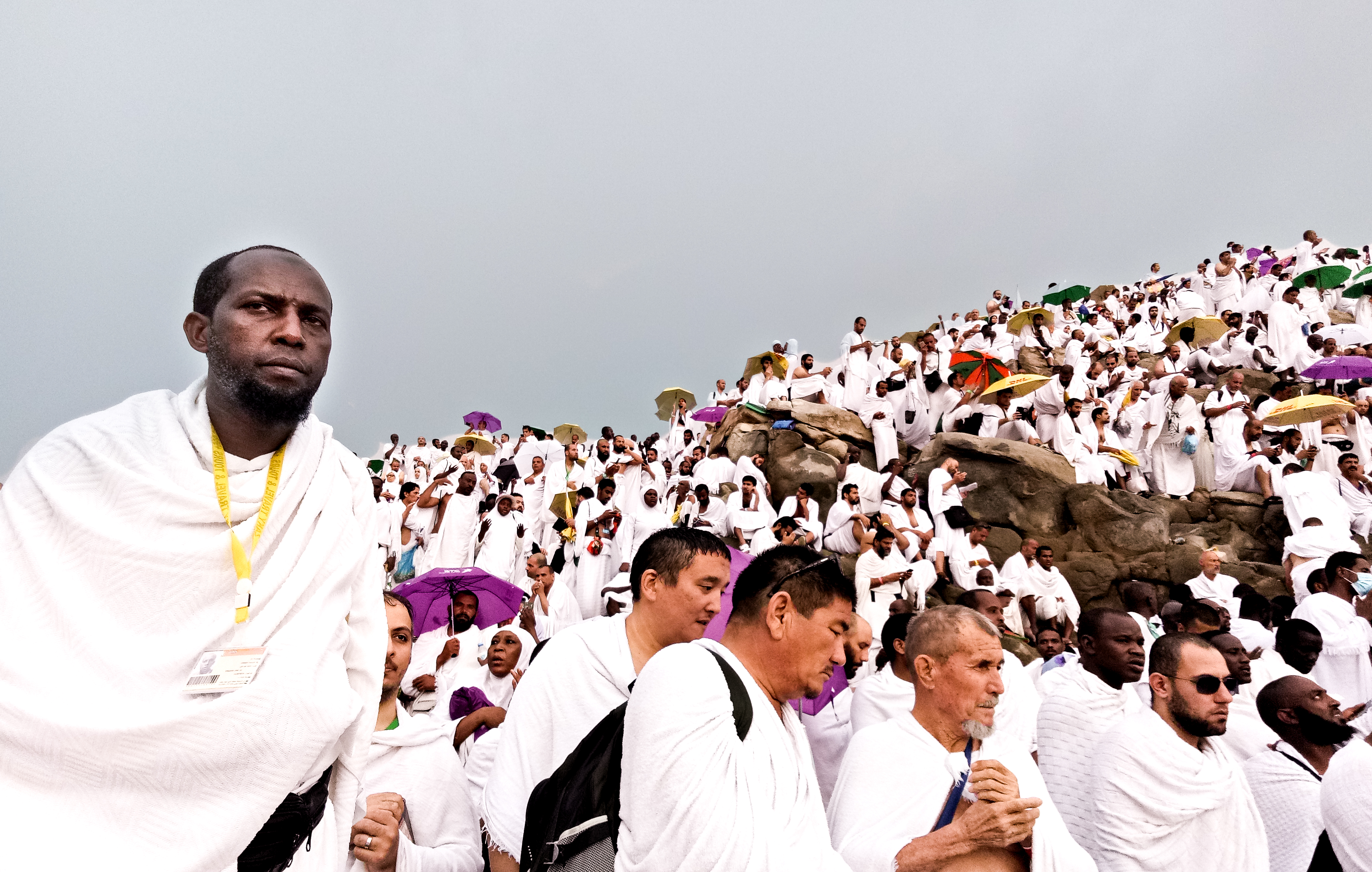
Pilgrims

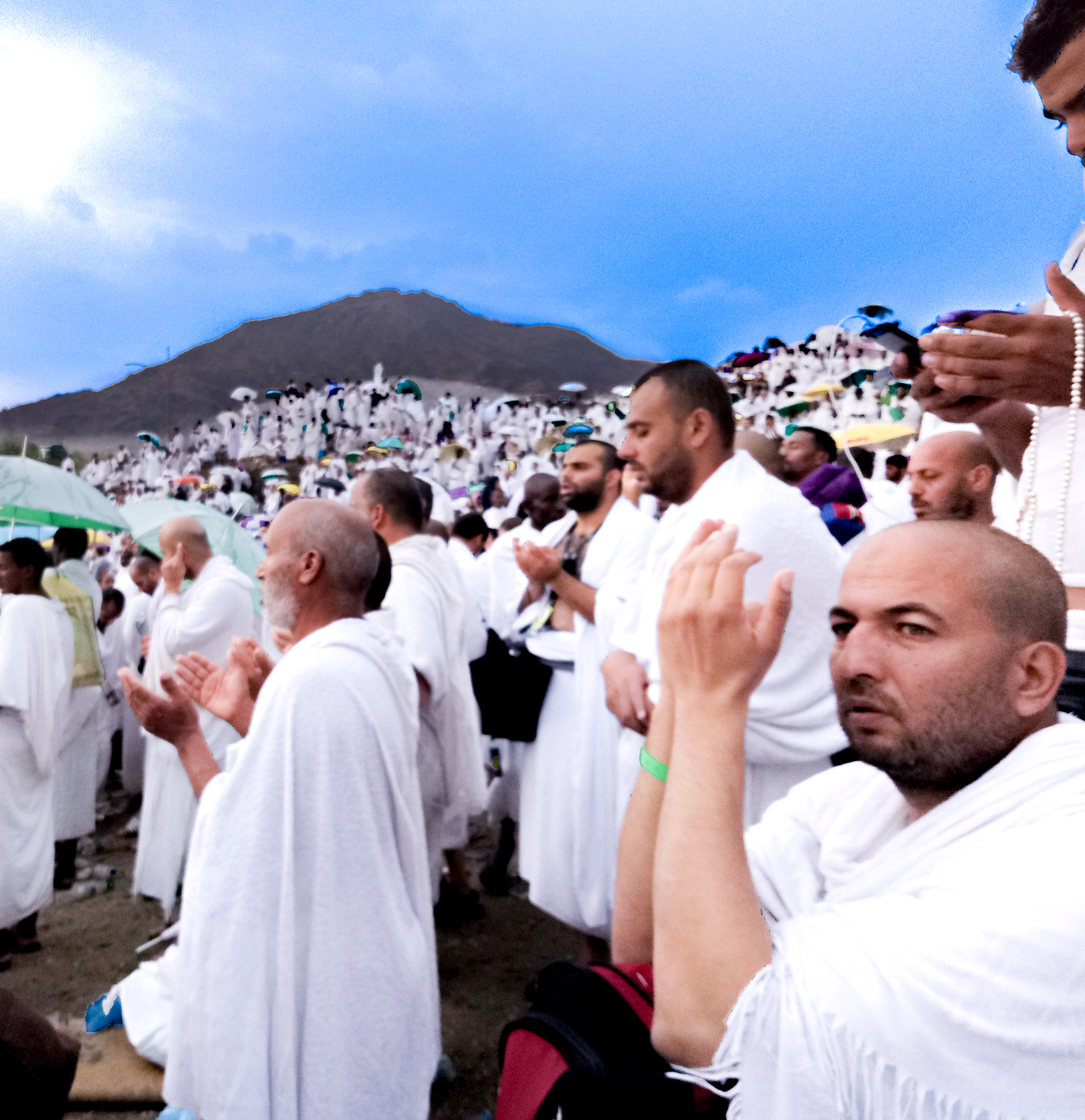

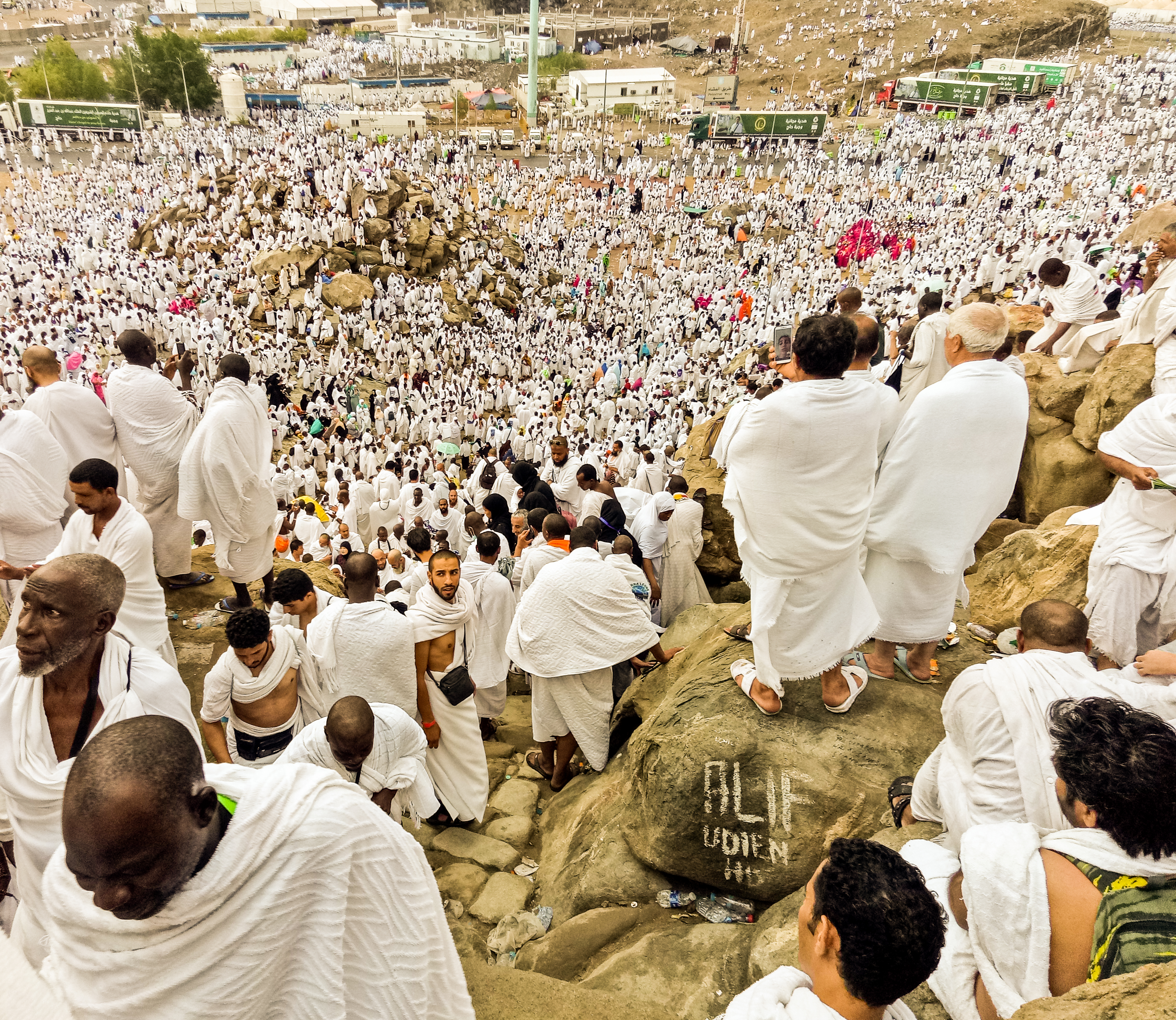

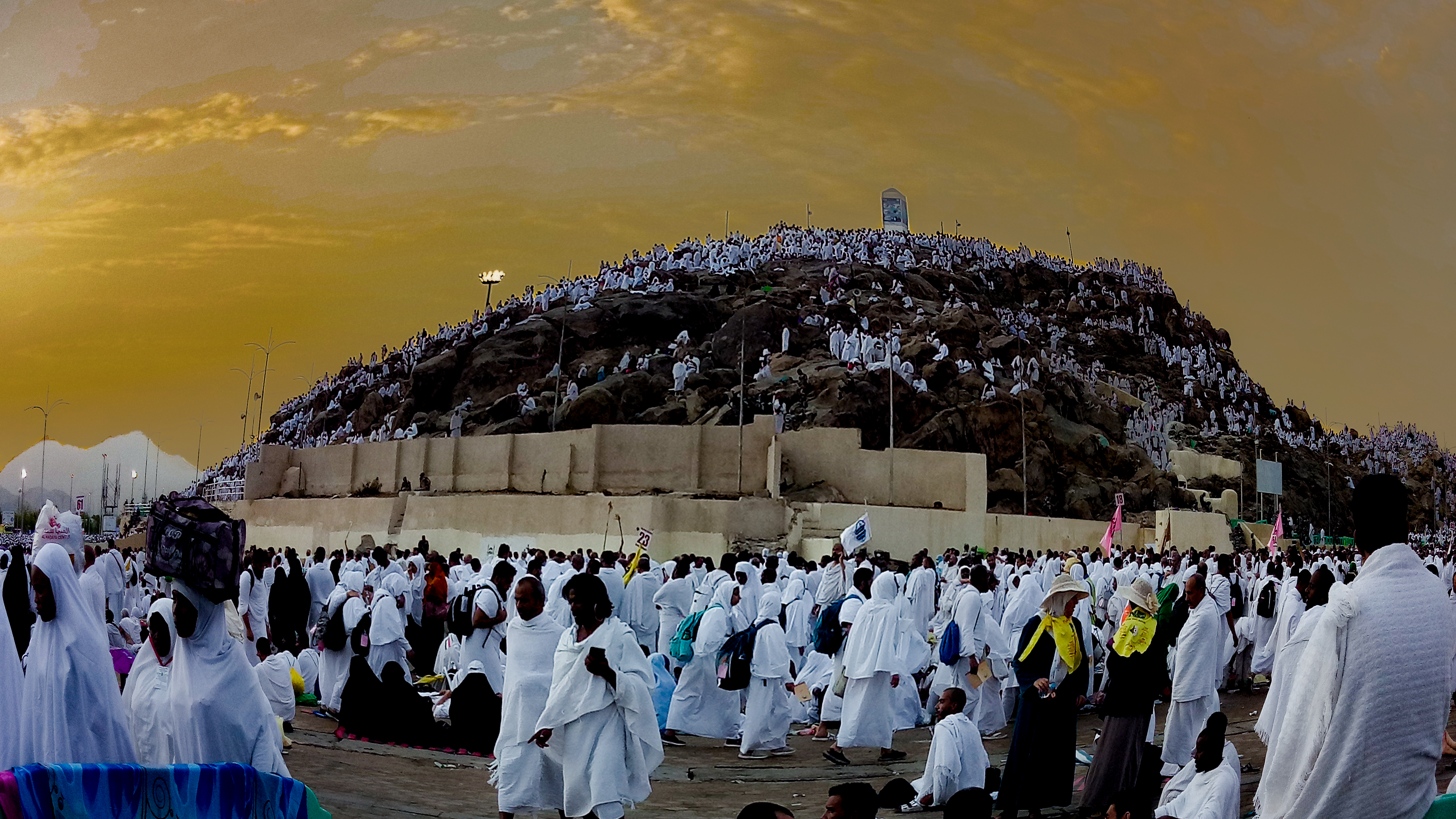

== In literature ==
The hill is referenced in James Joyce's novel Finnegans Wake and Elias Canetti's Crowds and Power.

== See also ==
- Du'a Arafah
- Sarat Mountains
- Al-Mash'ar al-Haram Mosque
