= Dhu'l-Hijja =

Twelfth month of the Islamic calendar

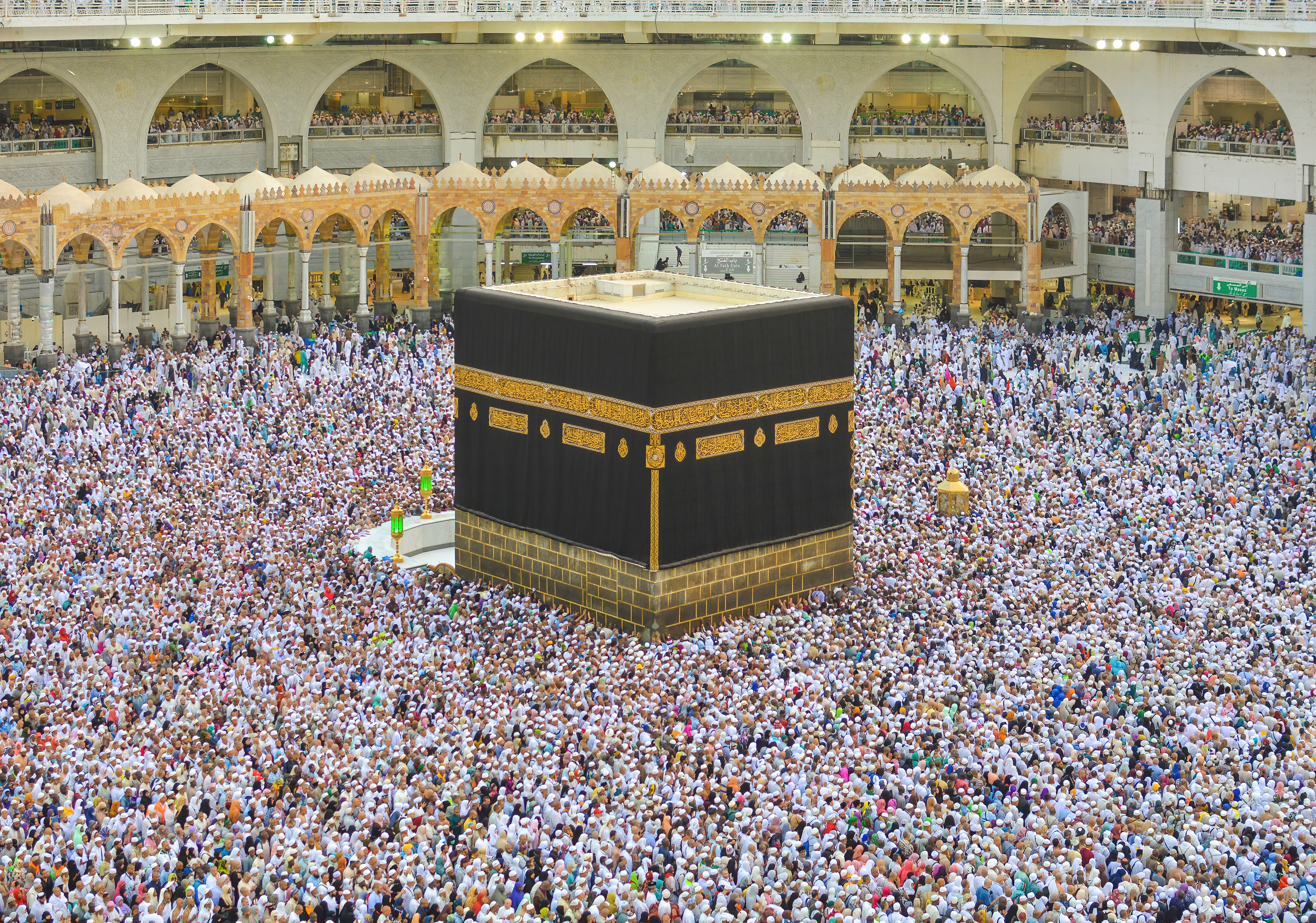
- The Kaaba during Hajj
- Native name: ذُو ٱلْحِجَّة (Arabic)
- Calendar: Islamic calendar
- Month number: 12
- Number of days: 29–30 (depends on actual observation of the moon's crescent)
- Significant days: Hajj; Day of Arafah; Eid al-Adha; Eid al-Ghadir

Dhu'l-Hijja (Note: Also spelled Dhul-Hijja, Dhu al-Hijjah and many other variants. Historically also spelled Zilhijjeh via Ottoman Turkish ذی الحجه (modern Turkish: zilhicce).) (Arabic: ذُو ٱلْحِجَّة, romanized: Ḏū l-Ḥijja IPA: [ðu‿l.ħid͡ʒːa]) is the twelfth and final month in the Islamic calendar. Being one of the four sacred months during which war is forbidden, it is the month in which the Ḥajj (Arabic: حج, lit. 'pilgrimage') takes place as well as Eid al-Adha (Arabic: عيد الأضحى, lit. 'the Festival of the Sacrifice').

The Arabic name of the month, Dhu'l-Hijja, means "Possessor of the Pilgrimage" or "The Month of the Pilgrimage". During this month, Muslim pilgrims from all around the world congregate at Mecca to visit the Kaaba. The Hajj rites begin on the eighth day and continue for four or five days. The Day of Arafah takes place on the ninth of the month. Eid al-Adha, the "Festival of the Sacrifice", begins on the tenth day and ends on the thirteenth day.

== Timing ==
The Islamic calendar is a lunar calendar, and months begin when new moon is sighted. Since the Islamic lunar calendar year is 11 to 12 days shorter than the solar year, Dhu'l-Hijja migrates throughout the seasons. The estimated start and end dates for Dhu'l-Hijja, based on the Umm al-Qura calendar of Saudi Arabia, are:

Dhu'l-Hijja dates between 2024 and 2028
AH	First day (CE/AD)	Last day (CE/AD)
1445	7 June 2024	6 July 2024
1446	28 May 2025	25 June 2025
1447	18 May 2026	15 June 2026
1448	8 May 2027	6 June 2027
1449	26 April 2028	24 May 2028

== Special days ==
- 8th–13th days of Dhu'l-Hijja are the days of the Hajj
- The 9th of Dhu'l-Hijja is the Day of Arafah
- Eid al-Adha on the 10th of Dhu'l-Hijja
- Eid al-Ghadir on the 18th of Dhu'l-Hijja

== Mention in Hadith ==
According to Hadith, great rewards have been mentioned for performing certain Islamic rituals on specific days of Dhu'l-Hijja:

One of the wives of Muhammad said: "Allah's Messenger used to fast the [first] nine days of Dhu'l-Hijja, the day of Ashura, and three days of each month."

Muhammad himself said: "There are no days more beloved to Allah that He be worshipped in them than the ten days of Dhu'l-Hijja, fasting every day of them is the equivalent of fasting a year, and standing every night of them (in prayer) is the equivalent of standing on the Night of Qadr."

Abu Qatada narrates that Muhammad was asked about fasting on the Day of Arafah. He said: as for the fasting on the Day of Arafah, I anticipate that Allah will forgive the year (i.e. the sins of the year) after it and the year before it.

== General events ==
- 01 Dhu'l-Hijja, nikah (marriage) of Ali and Fatima – AH 2 (24 February AD 624).
- 07 Dhu'l-Hijja, martyrdom of Twelver and Ismāʿīlī Shīʿite Imām, Muhammad al-Bāqir – AH 114.
- 08 Dhu'l-Hijja, Husayn ibn ʿAlī began his journey to Karbalāʾ from Mecca.
- 09 Dhu'l-Hijja, martyrdom of Muslim ibn ʿAqīl and Hani ibn Urwah in Kufah. It is also a day of supererogatory fasting– AH 60.
- 09 Dhu'l-Hijja, Day of Arafah
- 12 Dhu'l-Hijja or 18 Dhu'l-Hijja, assassination of Uthman.
- 15 Dhu'l-Hijja, birth of Twelver Imām, ʿAlī al-Naqī – AH 214 [Disputed date].
- 18 Dhu'l-Hijja, Shīʿite Muslims celebrate the event of Ghadir Khumm – AH 10.
- 18 Dhu'l-Hijja, assassination of Uthman, the prominent companion and son-in-law of Muhammad and Khadija. Husband of Ruqayya and Umm Kulthum.
- 19 Dhu'l-Hijja, Fatimah went to Ali's house after their marriage.
- 23 Dhu'l-Hijja, martyrdom of Meesam Tammar, friend of Ali – AH 60.
- 23 Dhu'l-Hijja, martyrdom of two sons of Muslim ibn ʿAqīl in Kufa – AH 60.
- 24 Dhu'l-Hijja, event of the mubahala took place ('Eid al-Mubahilah).
- 24 Dhu'l-Hijja, some historians mention that the Hadith, Ahl al-Kisa', event was also on the same day prior to Muhammad setting out for Mubahila.
- 24 Dhu'l-Hijja, supplication day and giving of alms with the ring by Ali. In reply verse, "Verily your Walee is Allah; and His Messenger and those who establish salah, and pay zakat while they be in Rukooʿ. (Maa-Idah: 55)" was revealed.
- 25 Dhu'l-Hijja, Sura Al-Insan or Hal Ata, or Dahar, which records the giving of alms to orphans, the destitute and travellers by Fatimah Hasan and Husain was revealed.
- 25 Dhu'l-Hijja, Ali becomes the Caliph of Islam – AH 35.
