= List of accidents and disasters by death toll =

This is a list of accidents and disasters by death toll. It shows the number of fatalities associated with various explosions, structural fires, flood disasters, coal mine disasters, and other notable accidents caused by negligence connected to improper architecture, planning, construction, design, and more. Purposeful disasters, such as military or terrorist attacks, are omitted.

While all of the listed accidents caused immediately massive numbers of lives lost, further widespread deaths were connected to many of these incidents, often the result of prolonged or lingering effects of the initial catastrophe. This was the case particularly in such cases as exposure to contaminated air, toxic chemicals or radiation, some years later due to lung damage, cancer, etc. Some numbers in the table below reflect both immediate and delayed deaths related to accidents, while many do not.

== Engineering ==
=== Explosions ===
Deaths	Date	Incident
20,000	30 May 1626	The Wanggongchang Explosion in the Wanggongchang Gunpowder Factory, Beijing, China, destroyed part of the city and killed 20,000 people
~6,000	1 November 1948	Boiler and ammunition explosion aboard an unidentified merchant ship that was evacuating Republic of China Army troops from Yingkou, China, to Taiwan in early November 1948. Other sources suggest this figure is inaccurate
400-6,000	18 August 1769	A lightning bolt caused the explosion of a gunpowder depot in Brescia, Italy, destroying one-sixth of the city. The official death toll is 400 but later estimates put it at around 3,000
1,300-4,000	7 August 1956	Ammunition trucks exploded near a railway station in Cali, Colombia. Approximately 4,000 more were injured
2,500	5 June 1941	The Smederevo Fortress explosion of stockpiled ammunition occurred at Smederevo Fortress near Belgrade in the Territory of the Military Commander in Serbia
1,950	6 December 1917	The Halifax Explosion in Nova Scotia, Canada, was caused by a collision between two ships, one of which was carrying explosives as well as benzole
1,082-2,280	6 March 1862	An ammunition warehouse in San Andrés Chalchicomula, Mexico, exploded and killed almost all of the Oaxaca brigade during the first days of the Second French intervention in Mexico
1,500+	18 November 1918	An ammunition transporter exploded in Hamont, Belgium
1,200	16 October 1926	The explosion of ammunition on the Chinese troopship Kuang Yuang, near Kiukiang, China
1,121	8 June 1943	The Japanese battleship Mutsu, was severely damaged while at Hashirajima harbor due to a magazine explosion; it sank on 9 June
1,100+	27 January 2002	The Lagos Armoury Explosion in Lagos, Nigeria, led to a stampede as people escaped; many deaths were from drowning as people fell into a hidden canal during the resulting panic
1,082	18 October 1998	The Jesse pipeline explosion, near Lagos, Nigeria, was caused by the pipeline rupturing; the cause is debated
800-1,300	14 April 1944	The Bombay Docks Explosion in Bombay, Bombay Presidency, British India, was caused by a fire on the SS Fort Stikine. The total number of dead is unknown
1,000+	31 August 1794	The explosion of a gunpowder factory in Grenelle, France
843	9 July 1917	A propellant explosion occurred on the British dreadnought battleship HMS Vanguard
788	26 November 1914	The British pre-dreadnought battleship HMS Bulwark was destroyed due to a magazine explosion
700	17 August 1989	An Iraqi military plant exploded at Al Hillah, Babil, Iraq
256–1,000+	16 September 1732	A military warehouse exploded, killing up to two-thirds of the population of the Campo Maior district of Portalegre, Portugal
621	27 February 1925	A dynamite depot exploded in Rio de Janeiro, Brazil
600+	28 March 1943	The Caterina Costa, exploded while at port of Naples; over 3000 were also injured
590	3 November 1893	Dynamite being transported on the steamship Cabo Machichaco, exploded at the port of Santander, Spain. More than 2,000 were injured
581	16 April 1947	The first Texas City disaster in the Port of Texas City, Texas, USA; over 5,000 were also injured
575	4 June 1989	The Ufa train disaster in Ufa, Bashkir ASSR (now Russia), occurred due to a build-up of flammable gases
565	21 September 1921	The Oppau explosion at a BASF plant in Germany was caused by a fertilizer explosion; the total number of dead is unknown
542	9 April 1945	Ammunition exploded on the SS Charles Henderson while it was at Bari, Italy; 1,800 more were injured
508	25 February 1984	A gasoline pipeline exploded in the favela of Vila Sao Jose, Cubatão, Brazil
500+	19 November 1984	The San Juanico disaster was a series of explosions at an LPG tank farm in Mexico City, Mexico; at least 5,000 more were injured
372	10 November 1944	The ammunition ship USS Mount Hood exploded at Seeadler Harbor, Manus. 371 others were injured and 10 other ships were severely damaged
370+	27 July 1816	A powder magazine in Negro Fort in Spanish Florida exploded during battle with United States forces
339	11 September 1905	The Japanese battleship Mikasa's magazine exploded while at port
320	17 July 1944	The Port Chicago disaster at Port Chicago, California, United States, occurred when munitions exploded while being loaded onto a cargo ship
~300	4 March 2012	The Brazzaville arms dump blasts were caused by a fire in an arms depot in Brazzaville, Republic of the Congo
298+	18 March 1937	The New London School explosion in New London, Texas, United States, was caused by a gas leak
291	29 December 2001	A fireworks stand explosion led to a fire in the Mesa Redonda shopping center in Lima, Peru. 235 bodies were recovered and over 144 were taken to hospital due to burns
286	25 September 1911	An explosion occurred on the French battleship Liberté due to a smokeless powder ignition. The exact number of dead is unknown
256	4 June 2015	A gas station exploded in Accra, Ghana. It was being used as a shelter from the ongoing rainfall and floods, which spread the fuel, and fire, to nearby buildings
243	23 December 2003	An explosion occurred in the PetroChina Chuandongbei natural gas field in Guoqiao, Chongqing, China
230+	2 July 2010	A tanker truck exploded in Kivu, in the Democratic Republic of the Congo, as locals tried to collect fuel from a truck that had overturned
228	20 October 1916	The magazine in the Russian battleship Imperatritsa Mariya exploded while anchored in Sevastopol
220	11 December 1944	Gasoline stored on a train transporting Japanese military, ammunition and civilians exploded near Itoman, Okinawa, Japan
219	25 June 2017	An oil truck exploded in Bahawalpur, Pakistan as locals tried to collect fuel from an overturned truck
218	4 August 2020	A grain silo storing ammonium nitrate exploded in Beirut, Lebanon
218	25 September 2023	A fuel depot exploded in Berkadzor, Nagorno-Karabakh
215	11 July 1978	The Los Alfaques disaster occurred in Sant Carles de la Ràpita, Spain, when a tanker truck exploded near a campsite
207	28 July 1948	A BASF tank car exploded near Ludwigshafen am Rhein, Germany; 3,818 were also injured
206	22 April 1992	A series of gas explosions took place in Guadalajara, Jalisco, Mexico due to pipe corrosion
206	17 September 2015	A tanker exploded in Juba, South Sudan
200+	6 June 1991	The Gotera ammunition dump in Addis Ababa, Ethiopia, exploded
150–240	18 July 1806	A gunpowder magazine exploded in Birgu, Malta, due to negligence when transferring shells from the magazine

=== Industrial ===
Deaths	Date	Incident	Location
3,787–16,000	2–3 December 1984	Bhopal disaster. The official death toll was 3,787; the total number is unknown	Union Carbide (now Dow Chemicals) factory, Bhopal, Madhya Pradesh, India
1,549	26 April 1942	Benxihu Colliery explosion	Benxi, Liaoning, Manchukuo (now China)
1,099	10 March 1906	Courrières mine disaster	Courrières, France
476–1,000	1931	Hawks Nest Tunnel disaster	Gauley Bridge, West Virginia, United States
687	15 December 1914	Mitsubishi Hōjō coal mine disaster	Kyūshū, Japan
682	9 May 1960	Laobaidong colliery coal dust explosion	Datong, China
581	16 April 1947	Texas City disaster	Texas City, Texas, U.S.
512	28 August 1899	Sumitomo Besshi bronze mine landslide and debris flow	Niihama, Shikoku, Japan
500+	19 November 1984	San Juanico Disaster	Mexico City, Mexico
458	9 November 1963	Mitsui Miike Coal Mine disaster	Mitsui Miike, Ōmuta, Fukuoka, Japan
439	14 October 1913	Senghenydd Colliery Disaster	Senghenydd, Wales
437	21 January 1960	Coalbrook mining disaster	Coalbrook, South Africa
428	6 June 1972	Wankie coal mine disaster	Wankie, Rhodesia (now Zimbabwe)
422	28 November 1914	Mine explosion caused by methane gas	New Yubari Yūbari, Hokkaidō, Japan
405	20 February 1946	Bergkamen mining disaster	Bergkamen, Germany
400+	28 January 2026	2026 Rubaya mine collapse	Rubaya mines, Democratic Republic of the Congo
372	27 December 1975	Chasnala mining disaster. Some sources claim the death toll was 375	Sudamdih Colliery, Dhanbad, India
369	21 December 1917	Coal mine disaster at Kaijima-kirino mine	Miyata, Fukuoka Japan
365	20 July 1907	Hokoku mine gas explosion	Hokoku, Itoda, Kyūshū, Japan
362	6 December 1907	Monongah Mining disaster	Monongah, West Virginia, U.S.
361	12 December 1866	Oaks Colliery mining disaster. The official death toll is 361 but the actual number is uncertain	Barnsley, England
344	21 December 1910	Pretoria Pit Disaster	Westhoughton, England
319	31 May 1892	Marie ore mine fire	Příbram, Austria-Hungary (now Czech Republic)
301	13 May 2014	Soma mine disaster	Manisa, Turkey
300+	9 May 1993	Nambija mine disaster. As the total number of residents is unknown, a definitive death toll may never be established.	Zamora-Chinchipe, Ecuador
299	7 February 1962	Luisenthal mine disaster	Saarland, West Germany
290	23 June 1894	Coal dust ignition led to a firedamp explosion	Albion Colliery, Wales
289	11 September 2012	Pakistan factory fires	Karachi, Pakistan
277	8 September 2008	2008 Shanxi mudslide caused by collapse of a mine landfill	Xiangfen, Linfen, Shanxi, China
270	25 January 2019	Brumadinho dam disaster caused by the collapse of a mining dam	Brumadinho, Minas Gerais, Brazil
268	28 May 1965	1965 Dhanbad coal mine disaster. The official death toll is 268, although some sources place it at 375	Dhanbad, Bihar, India
268	11 September 1878	Abercarn colliery disaster	Abercarn, Wales
266	22 September 1934	Gresford disaster	Gresford, Wales
263	22 October 1913	Stag Canyon Mine No. 2 explosion	Dawson, New Mexico, U.S.
263	3 March 1992	Kozlu mine disaster	Incirharmani, Kozlu, Zonguldak, Turkey
262	8 August 1956	Marcinelle mining disaster	Marcinelle, Belgium
259	13 November 1909	Cherry Mine disaster	Cherry, Illinois, U.S.
259	24 November 1909	Onoura Kirino coal mine explosion	Miyata, Kyūshū, Japan
254	11 November 1937	Kogushi sulfur mine collapse	Tsumagoi, Western Gunma, Japan
247	28 March 1965	El Cobre disaster: an earthquake caused the copper mine's tailing dams to fail, washing away the village	El Soldado mine, Valparaiso, Chile
243	23 December 2003	PetroChina Chuandongbei natural gas field explosion	Guoqiao, Kai County, Chongqing, China
239	19 December 1907	Darr Mine Disaster	Jacobs Creek, Pennsylvania, U.S.
237	1 June 1965	Yamano mine explosion	Chikuho coalfield, Kyūshū, Japan
235	14 June 1894	Karviná Colliery Disaster	Karviná, Austria-Hungary (now Czech Republic)
216	19 May 1902	Fraterville Mine disaster	Fraterville, Tennessee, U.S.
214	15 February 2005	Sunjiawan mine disaster	Sunjiawan, Fuxin, Liaoning, China
210	15 June 1899	Hokoku mine gas explosion	Hokoku, Itoda, Kyūshū, Japan
204	16 January 1862	Hartley Colliery Disaster	New Hartley, Northumberland, England
202	25 May 1917	Bolevec Disaster	Pilsen, Bohemia, now in Czech Republic
200+	1 May 1900	Scofield Mine disaster	Scofield, Utah, U.S.
200+	27 February 1908	Mina Rosita Vieja disaster	San Juan de Sabinas, Coahuila, Mexico

=== Nuclear and radiation ===
Deaths	Date	Incident	Location
200–6,000	29 September 1957	Mayak nuclear waste storage tank explosion. No immediate cases of acute radiation sickness were recorded, but, since 270,000 people were exposed to dangerous radiation levels, the long term effects, such as excess relative risk of various cancers, are still being studied.	Chelyabinsk, Soviet Union
100–240	10 October 1957	Windscale fire. There were no deaths due to deterministic effects (i.e., people receiving a high dose of radiation, rapidly becoming ill, and dying). The 100–240 figure is an estimate of the number of people who died later in life due to cancer caused by radiation from the accident.	Windscale (now Sellafield), Cumbria, England.
95–4,000+	26 April 1986	Chernobyl disaster. Official reports logged 31 immediate deaths, approximately 64 recorded cancer deaths by 2008, and potentially up to, but no more than, 4,000 total cancer deaths. Far higher death toll estimates have been made, but these are disputed.	Pripyat, Ukrainian SSR, Soviet Union
18	August 2000 – March 2001	Patients receiving treatment for cancer at the Instituto Oncológico Nacional received lethal doses of radiation.	Panama City, Panama
13	1996	1996 San Juan de Dios radiotherapy accident. 114 patients received an overdose of radiation.	San José, Costa Rica
11	December 1990	Clinic of Zaragoza radiotherapy accident. 27 other patients were injured.	Zaragoza, Spain
10	10 August 1985	Soviet submarine K-431 accident. 49 other people received radiation injuries, 10 of whom suffered acute radiation sickness.	near Vladivostok, Russia
10	1974–1976	Columbus radiotherapy accident. 88 other patients were severely injured.	Columbus, Ohio, United States

=== Structural collapses ===
Deaths	Date	Incident	Location
26,000–240,000	8 August 1975	Failure of Banqiao Dam and 60 other dams in the Ru River basin. The official death toll was 26,000, but Human Rights Watch later estimated it to be 230,000, and Discovery Channel estimated 240,000. This figure includes subsequent disease- and hunger-related deaths.	Zhumadian, China
20,000+	AD 27	Amphitheater collapse	Fidenae, Italy
7,800	11 September 2023	Derna dam collapses. The official death toll was 4,540. The UN initially estimated 11,300 (though they later retracted it) and the Sadiq Institute suggested 14,000 to 24,000.	Derna, Libya
1,800–25,000	11 August 1979	Machchhu dam failure	Morbi, India
2,208	31 May 1889	Johnstown Flood	Johnstown, Pennsylvania, United States
1,134	24 April 2013	Rana Plaza collapse	Savar Upazila, Bangladesh
1,000+	19 August 1917	Tigra Dam failure	Gwalior, India
1,000	12 July 1961	Panshet Dam failure	Pune, India
500–1500	20 September 1807	Eitai Bridge collapse	Tokyo, Japan
941	3 May 1868	Iruka Lake Dam failure	Inuyama, Japan
608	30 April 1802	Puentes Dam collapse and flooding	Lorca, Spain
502	29 June 1995	Sampoong Department Store collapse	Seoul, South Korea
400–600+	12 March 1928	St. Francis Dam failure	Los Angeles County, California, United States
423	2 December 1959	Malpasset Dam failure	Fréjus, France
356	1 December 1923	Gleno Dam failure	Bergamo, Italy
250–434	18 August 2008	Koshi Barrage failure	Koshi River, Nepal
270+	25 January 2019	Failure of tailings dam on Córrego do Feijão iron ore mine	Brumadinho, Minas Gerais, Brazil
268	19 July 1985	Val di Stava dam collapse	Tesero, Italy
244	11 March 1864	Dale Dike Reservoir dam failure after the Great Sheffield Flood	Sheffield, England, United Kingdom
238	10 June 1972	Dam failure caused by 1972 Black Hills flood	Rapid City, South Dakota, United States
236	8 April 2025	Jet Set nightclub roof collapse	Santo Domingo, Dominican Republic
107–500	1 May 1966	Mir-Plakalnitsa tailings dam failure. The official death toll was 107	Vratsa, Bulgaria
226	16 April 1850	Angers Bridge collapse	Angers, France
200+	31 October 2017	Punggye-ri Nuclear Test Site tunnel collapse	North Korea
200+	28 July 1983	Landslide during construction of the Guavio River hydroelectric dam	Bogotá, Colombia
~200	20 January 1980	Collapse of wooden bleachers at a bullring during corralejas	Sincelejo, Colombia
7-169	17 November 1981	Manila Film Center collapse. The official death toll was 7, but witnesses and later reports claimed up to 169.	Pasay, Philippines
~160	10 December 2016	Uyo church collapse	Uyo, Nigeria
150+	10 September 2024	Alau Dam collapse which led to the Borno State flooding	Borno State, Nigeria
148+	24 August 2024	Arbaat Dam collapse	Port Sudan, Sudan
120–176	20 April 1986	Kantale Dam failure	Kantale, Sri Lanka
145	10 January 1860	Pemberton Mill collapse	Lawrence, Massachusetts, United States
144	9 January 1959	Vega de Tera disaster	Ribadelago, Spain
141	30 October 2022	2022 Morbi bridge collapse	Morbi, India
140	19 November 1974	Makahali River bridge collapse	Baitadi, Nepal
139	16 May 1874	Mill River dam failure	Williamsburg, Massachusetts, United States
139	13 September 1976	Apartment building collapse	Karachi, Pakistan
137	13 August 1993	Collapse of the Royal Plaza Hotel	Nakhon Ratchasima, Thailand
125	26 February 1972	Buffalo Creek flood	Logan County, West Virginia, United States
125	8 November 1984	Rope bridge collapse	Munnar, India
120	1 February 1963	Nuns' school chapel collapse	Biblian, Ecuador
116	12 September 2014	Synagogue Church hotel collapse	Lagos State, Nigeria
114	1951	Heiwa Lake Dam failure	Kameoka, Japan
114	17 July 1981	Hyatt Regency walkway collapse	Kansas City, Missouri, United States
111	11 September 2015	Mecca crane collapse	Masjid al-Haram, Mecca, Saudi Arabia
111	13 August 1935	Sella Zerbino dam failure	Molare, Italy
105	1951	Taisho Lake Dam failure	Ide, Japan
100+	1 December 2000	Dongguan Mall collapse	Dongguan, China
100+	21 February 1890	Walnut Grove Dam failure	Wickenburg, Arizona, United States
100+	16 June 1990	Saque Comprehensive College collapse	Port Harcourt, Nigeria

=== Structural fires ===
Deaths	Date	Incident	Location
2,000–3,000	8 December 1863	Church of the Company Fire	Santiago, Chile
1,700–2,845+	2 September 1949	Chongqing Waterfront Fire. Also known as the "9–2 Fire"	Chongqing, China
2,000-2,300	25 May 1845	Canton Theater fire	Canton (now Guangzhou), China
1,195-2,000+	2 August 1893	Kamli theater fire	Kamli, Japan
900	June 1871	Theater fire	Shanghai, China
800	2 February 1836	Lehman Theater fire. The official death toll was 126, but rumors and later reports put it much higher.	St. Petersburg, Russia
694	18 February 1977	Xinjiang 61st Regiment Farm fire	Xinjiang, China
670	26 February 1918	Happy Valley Racecourse fire	Hong Kong
658	13 February 1937	Antoung Movie Theater fire	Nantong, China
602	30 December 1903	Iroquois Theatre fire	Chicago, Illinois, United States
600	20 May 1872	Theater fire	Tientsin, China
538	23 December 1995	Dayananda Anglo Vedic private school fire	Mandi Dabwali, Haryana, India
530	17 March 2000	Kanungu church fire	Kanungu, Uganda
500	17 December 1961	Gran Circus Norte-Americano – Niterói circus fire	Niterói, Rio de Janeiro, Brazil
492	28 November 1942	Cocoanut Grove fire	Boston, Massachusetts, United States
448	8 December 1881	Ringtheater fire. The official death toll was 386 but later reports placed it to 448, 875 or "nearly 1,000" .	Vienna, Austria
430	13 January 1883	Circus Ferroni fire	Berdichev, Ukraine
424	1 August 2004	Paraguay supermarket fire	Asunción, Paraguay
400	17 December 1778	Coliseo theater fire	Zaragoza, Spain
377–470+	19 August 1978	Cinema Rex fire	Abadan, Iran
~360	14 February 2012	Comayagua prison fire. The exact death toll is unknown	Comayagua, Honduras
326+	30 June 1900	1900 Hoboken Docks fire	Hoboken, New Jersey, United States
325	22 May 1967	L'Innovation Department Store fire	Brussels, Belgium
323	10 December 1994	1994 Karamay fire	Karamay, China
322	21 April 1930	Ohio Penitentiary fire	Columbus, Ohio, United States
312	27 March 1910	Ököritófülpös barn fire	Ököritófülpös, Hungary
309	25 December 2000	Dongdu Commercial shopping center fire	Luoyang, China
291	29 December 2001	Mesa Redonda fire	Lima, Peru
289	28 October 1995	1995 Baku Metro fire	Baku, Azerbaijan
289	11 September 2012	2012 Karachi garment factory fire	Karachi, Pakistan
278+	5 December 1876	Brooklyn Theatre fire. The official death toll was 278, although one coroner's report listed 283 fatalities	Brooklyn, New York, United States
250-300	15 February 1909	Flores Theater fire	Acapulco, Mexico
242	27 January 2013	Kiss nightclub fire in Santa Maria	Rio Grande do Sul, Brazil
233	27 November 1994	Discothèque fire	Fuxin, China
209	23 April 1940	Rhythm Club fire	Natchez, Mississippi, United States
208	6 March 1943	Hoteiza theater fire	Kucchan, Japan
200+	14 July 1960	Mental hospital fire	Guatemala City, Guatemala

== Recreation ==
=== Amusement parks ===
Deaths	Date	Incident	Amusement park	Location
28	14 February 2004	The roof of the indoor water park collapsed. Approximately 200 more were injured	Transvaal Park	Yasenevo, Moscow, Russia
15	27 June 2015	A dust explosion at the music stage caused a fire that also injured over 400 others	Formosa Fun Coast	Bali, New Taipei, Taiwan
8	11 May 1984	A cigarette lighter ignited the flammable foam-rubber walls of the Haunted Castle	Six Flags Great Adventure	Jackson Township, New Jersey, United States
7	9 June 1979	Either faulty wiring or sabotage caused a fire at the park's ghost train ride	Luna Park Sydney	Sydney, Australia
7	14 August 1981	A crane collided with the Skylab carousel. Fifteen more were injured	Hamburger Dom	Hamburg, Germany
6	13 August 1944	A spark ignited a fire in the Virginia Reel ride, which also injured over 100 others	Palisades Amusement Park	Cliffside Park-Fort Lee, New Jersey, United States
6	29 June 2010	Eco-Adventure Valley Space Journey, a rocket launch ride, malfunctioned, injuring ten others	OCT East	Yantian District, Shenzhen, Guangdong, China
5	30 May 1972	The Big Dipper roller coaster broke free from its haulage rope. Thirteen others were injured	Battersea Park	Battersea, London, England
5	13 August 2007	Two gondolas on a Ferris wheel collided, causing people to fall. Eleven others were injured	World Carnival Busan	Busan, South Korea
5	23 June 2017	The water in the swimming pool became electrified	Kuzuluk Aquapark	Akyazi, Turkey
4	24 July 1930	A bolt came loose from the Big Dipper roller coaster. Seventeen more were injured	Krug Park	Omaha, Nebraska, United States
4	25 October 2016	One of the Thunder River Rapids Ride rafts flipped upside down and became wedged under a conveyor belt	Dreamworld	Gold Coast, Queensland, Australia
4	22 June 1910	Two of the Rough Riders cars derailed and fell 60 feet (18 m). Fourteen others sustained life-threatening injuries.	Golden City Amusement Park	Coney Island, New York City, United States
3	14 June 1986	One of the Mindbender carriages failed and crashed into a concrete pillar. Twenty others were injured	Galaxyland	Edmonton, Alberta, Canada
3	26 July 1978	A Skyway gondola detached from its cable and plunged to the ground, seriously injuring one other person	Six Flags St. Louis	Eureka, Missouri, United States

=== Crowd crushes ===
Deaths	Date	Incident	Location
4,000	29 March 1809	Porto Boat Bridge disaster. Civilians fleeing the advancing French army tried to cross the Douro river over a fragile pontoon bridge, which collapsed	Porto, Portugal
992-2,500	5 June 1941	Mass panic in an air raid shelter, during Japanese bombing of Chongqing. Most deaths were caused by suffocation. The official death toll was 992 but some news articles put it at 2,500	Chongqing, China
2,411+	24 September 2015	Crowd crush en route to the Stoning of the Devil ritual. The official death toll was 769	Mina, Mecca, Saudi Arabia
1,426	3 July 1990	Crowd crush inside the Mo'essem pedestrian tunnel	Mina, Mecca, Saudi Arabia
1,386+	30 May 1896	Khodynka Tragedy. A crowd crush at the coronation of Nicholas II. The official death toll was 1,386 but it may as have been as high as 4,000	Khodynka Field, Moscow, Russian Empire
965	31 August 2005	Al-Aaimmah bridge stampede. Because the stampede was triggered by reports of a bombing, this figure is also included in the higher estimate for casualties of the War in Iraq	Baghdad, Iraq
316-800	3 February 1954	Prayag Kumbh Mela stampede which took place at a religious festival. The official death toll was 316	Allahabad, Uttar Pradesh, India
363	12 January 2006	2006 Hajj stampede	Mina, Mecca, Saudi Arabia
357	22 November 2010	Phnom Penh stampede occurred as people crossed a bridge during the Water Festival	Phnom Penh, Cambodia
354	23 October 1942	Crowd crush during an attack by the RAF Bomber Command in World War II as they made their way into Galleria delle Grazie, a railway tunnel used as an air-raid shelter	Genoa, Italy
328	24 May 1964	Estadio Nacional disaster. This count does not include anyone killed by gunfire during the stampede	Lima, Peru
270	23 May 1994	1994 Hajj stampede	Mina, Mecca, Saudi Arabia
258	25 January 2005	Mandher Devi temple stampede	Wai, Maharashtra, India
251	1 February 2004	2004 Hajj stampede	Mina, Mecca, Saudi Arabia
241	11 October 1711	Pont de la Guillotière stampede caused by revellers getting stuck at an overturned carriage	Lyon, France
224	30 September 2008	Stampede at the Chamunda Devi temple	Jodhpur, India
183	16 June 1883	Victoria Hall theatre stairway crush	Sunderland, England
173	3 March 1943	Bethnal Green tube station panic	London, England
159	29 October 2022	Seoul Halloween crowd crush. This count includes a survivor who later took their own life	Seoul, South Korea
146	3 August 2008	Naina Devi Temple stampede	Bilaspur, Himachal Pradesh, India
135	1 October 2022	Kanjuruhan Stadium disaster following a football match	Malang, East Java, Indonesia
130	23 November 1994	Gowari stampede in the Maharashtra State Legislature building	Nagpur, Maharastra, India
126	9 May 2001	Accra Sports Stadium disaster	Accra, Ghana
124	1 January 1956	Yahiko Shrine Stampede at a New Year event	Yahiko, Niigata, Japan
121-123	2 July 2024	Hathras crowd crush caused by overcrowding during a satsang	Hathras district, Uttar Pradesh, India
118	9 April 1998	1998 Hajj stampede. The unofficial death toll may be up to 150	Mina, Mecca, Saudi Arabia
115	19 September 1902	Shiloh Baptist Church stampede	Birmingham, Alabama
115	13 October 2013	Madhya Pradesh stampede during Navaratri	Ratangarh, India
94-110	11 February 1823	Crowd crush during Carnival at the Franciscan Church of St Mary of Jesus	Valletta, Malta
106	14 January 2011	Sabarimala crowd crush during an annual pilgrimage	Sabarimala, Kerala, India
105-200+	1–2 September 2024	Makala jailbreak attempt. A crowd crush occurred while inmates were attempting to escape the Makala Central Prison. 24 more were fatally shot	Selembao, Kinshasa, Democratic Republic of the Congo
105	10 October 1991	Yingze Park lantern festival stampede	Taiyuan, Shanxi, China

=== Sporting events ===
Deaths	Date	Incident	Location
20,000	27 AD	Fidenae Stadium disaster	Fidenae, italy
13,000	Between 284 and 286 AD	Collapse of a wall of Circus Maximus	Rome, Italy
1,112	140 AD	Collapse of the upper tier of the Circus Maximus	Rome, Italy
670	26 February 1918	Happy Valley Racecourse fire	Happy Valley, Hong Kong
328	24 May 1964	Estadio Nacional disaster	Lima, Peru
~200	20 January 1980	Collapse of wooden bleachers at Corralejas bullring	Sincelejo, Sucre, Colombia
135	1 October 2022	2022 Kanjuruhan Stadium disaster	Malang, East Java, Indonesia
127	9 May 2001	Accra Sports Stadium disaster	Accra Sports Stadium, Accra, Ghana
97	15 April 1989	Hillsborough stadium crush	Sheffield, England
93	12 March 1988	Dasharath Stadium disaster following a hailstorm	Kathmandu, Nepal
83	16 October 1996	Doroteo Guamuch Flores disaster	Guatemala City, Guatemala
82	11 June 1955	Le Mans disaster	Le Mans, France
74-79	1 February 2012	Port Said Stadium disaster. The official death toll is 74	Port Said, Egypt
71	23 June 1968	Puerta 12 crush. Some reports put the death toll as high as 200	Buenos Aires, Argentina
66	2 January 1971	Second Ibrox stadium disaster	Glasgow, Scotland
66	20 October 1982	Luzhniki disaster. The official death toll is 66 but some reports claim it was 340	Moscow, USSR
61	1 January 2013	Félix Houphouët-Boigny Stadium Disaster	Abidjan, Ivory Coast
56–140	1 December 2024	2024 Nzérékoré stampede. The official death toll is 66 but human rights organizations put it at 140	Nzérékoré, Guinea
56	11 May 1985	Bradford City stadium fire	Bradford, England
43	11 April 2001	Ellis Park Stadium disaster	Johannesburg, South Africa
42	13 January 1991	Oppenheimer Stadium disaster	Orkney, South Africa
40-42	17 September 1967	Kayseri Atatürk Stadium disaster	Kayseri, Central Anatolia, Turkey
39	29 May 1985	Heysel Stadium disaster	Brussels, Belgium
33	9 March 1946	Burnden Park disaster	Bolton, England
32	3 October 2014	Patna stampede	Patna, Bihar, India
23-28	9 September 1928	1928 Italian Grand Prix. Emilio Materassi and over 20 spectators were killed when the driver crashed into a grandstand. The number of spectators killed has been reported as somewhere between 22 and 27	Monza, Italy
25	5 April 1902	First Ibrox stadium disaster	Glasgow, Scotland
22–24	15 November 1982	Drunken football fans provoked a stampede at a Deportivo Cali vs. América de Cali game at Estadio Olímpico Pascual Guerrero	Cali, Colombia
22	29 November 1900	Thanksgiving Day Disaster. Spectators on the roof of a glass factory observing the Big Game caused the roof to collapse	San Francisco, California, U.S.
21	8 February 1981	Karaiskakis Stadium disaster. A crowd crush at Gare 7 of the old Karaiskakis Stadium after a football game between Olympiacos and AEK Athens	Piraeus, Greece
21	22 May 2021	Gansu ultramarathon disaster. 21 out of 172 runners died in windy and cold weather in a 100k mountain running race	Jingtai County, Gansu, China
19-22	29 March 2009	2009 Houphouët-Boigny stampede	Abidjan, Ivory Coast
18	18 November 1981	A wall collapsed at the regional stadium in a football match between Deportes Tolima and Deportivo Cali	Ibague, Colombia
18	5 May 1992	Furiani disaster. A temporary grand stand collapsed before the French Cup semi-final match between SC Bastia and Olympique Marseille	Bastia, Corsica, France
16	16 August 1980	Stampede at the Kolkata Derby. Now commemorated by Football Lovers' Day	Eden Gardens, Kolkata, India
15	13–14 August 1979	1979 Fastnet yachting race storms. As well as the 15 sailors, two spectators and four others who were shadowing the race died.	Fastnet Rock, Ireland
15	10 September 1961	Wolfgang Von Trips and 14 spectators killed when the Formula 1 car flew into the crowd during the 1961 Italian Grand Prix	Monza, Italy
13	12 May 1957	1957 Mille Miglia road race. Driver Alfonso de Portago, ploughed into spectators, killing himself, his co-driver/navigator, Ed Nelson and 9 spectators. Two unrelated deaths occurred earlier in the road race	Guidizzolo, Mantua; Reggio Emilia; Florence
13	14 September 2008	2008 Congo football riots. Occurred after a DRC football league second division game between US Socozaki and AS Nyuki at Matokeo stadium	Butembo, North Kivu, DR Congo
13	31 August 1952	13 killed and 42 injured, including the racing driver, when his car plunged into spectators	Grenzlandring, Wegberg, Mönchengladbach, West Germany
12-13	18 January 1953	F1 driver Nino Farina ploughed into the crowds, killing either 9 or 10 spectators, during the 1953 Argentine Grand Prix. Three more people were killed in unrelated accidents	Autódromo Juan y Oscar Gálvez, Buenos Aires, Argentina
12	20 May 2023	San Salvador crowd crush	Estadio Cuscatlán stadium, San Salvador, El Salvador
12	2 March 1969	A dragster crashed through a chain-link fence into spectators. 11 were killed during the crash, and a 12th person died later in hospital	Yellow River Dragstrip, Covington, Georgia, US
12	8 August 1903	Baker Bowl bleachers collapse	Philadelphia, Pennsylvania, U.S.
11	16 September 1911	A car went through a rail fence into the crowd during a race	New York State Fairgrounds, Syracuse, New York, US
11	16 September 2011	2011 Reno Air Races crash. 11 killed including pilot Jimmy Leeward who crashed into grandstand VIP booths	Reno Stead Airport, Reno, Nevada, US
11	4 June 2025	Bengaluru crowd crush during a cricket match	Bengaluru, India.

== Transportation ==
=== Aviation ===
Deaths	Date	Incident	Location
583	27 March 1977	Tenerife airport disaster	Tenerife, Canary Islands, Spain
520	12 August 1985	Japan Air Lines Flight 123	Ueno, Japan
349	12 November 1996	Charkhi Dadri mid-air collision	Charkhi Dadri, Haryana, India
346	3 March 1974	Turkish Airlines Flight 981	Fontaine-Chaalis, France
329	23 June 1985	Air India Flight 182	Atlantic Ocean, near Cork, Ireland
301	19 August 1980	Saudia Flight 163	Riyadh, Saudi Arabia
298	17 July 2014	Malaysia Airlines Flight 17	Hrabove, Ukraine
290	3 July 1988	Iran Air Flight 655	Bandar Abbas, Iran
227-350	January 8, 1996	Air Africa (RA-26222). The total number of ground fatalities is unknown	Kinshasa, Zaire (now the Democratic Republic of the Congo)
275	19 February 2003	2003 Iran Ilyushin Il-76 crash	Kerman, Iran
273	25 May 1979	American Airlines Flight 191	Des Plaines, Illinois, United States
270	21 December 1988	Pan Am Flight 103	Lockerbie, United Kingdom
269	1 September 1983	Korean Air Lines Flight 007	Sea of Japan, near Moneron Island, Russian SFSR, USSR
265	12 November 2001	American Airlines Flight 587	Belle Harbor, New York City, New York, U.S.
264	26 April 1994	China Airlines Flight 140	Komaki, Japan
261	11 July 1991	Nigeria Airways Flight 2120	Jeddah, Saudi Arabia
260	12 June 2025	Air India Flight 171	Ahmedabad, India
257	11 April 2018	Algerian Air Force (7T-WIV)	Boufarik, Algeria
257	28 November 1979	Air New Zealand Flight 901	Mount Erebus, Antarctica
256	12 December 1985	Arrow Air Flight 1285R	Gander, Newfoundland, Canada
239	8 March 2014	Malaysia Airlines Flight 370	Indian Ocean
234	26 September 1997	Garuda Indonesia Flight 152	near Medan, Indonesia
230	17 July 1996	Trans World Airlines Flight 800	Atlantic Ocean, off East Moriches, New York, U.S.
229	2 September 1998	Swissair Flight 111	Atlantic Ocean, off Peggys Cove, Nova Scotia, Canada
229	6 August 1997	Korean Air Flight 801	Asan-Maina, Guam, U.S.
228	1 June 2009	Air France Flight 447	Atlantic Ocean, area of Saint Peter and Saint Paul Archipelago
225	25 May 2002	China Airlines Flight 611	Taiwan Strait, near Penghu Islands, Taiwan
224	31 October 2015	Metrojet Flight 9268	near Hasna, North Sinai Governorate, Egypt
223	25 May 1991	Lauda Air Flight 004	Phu Toei National Park, Thailand
217	31 October 1999	EgyptAir Flight 990	Atlantic Ocean, area of Nantucket, Massachusetts, U.S.
213	1 January 1978	Air India Flight 855	Arabian Sea, off Mumbai, India
202	16 February 1998	China Airlines Flight 676	Dayuan District, Taiwan
200	10 July 1985	Aeroflot Flight 5143	near Uchkuduk, Uzbek SSR, USSR

=== Cable cars ===
Deaths	Date	Incident	Location
42	9 March 1976	1976 Cavalese cable car crash	Cavalese, Italy
20	3 February 1998	1998 Cavalese cable car crash	Cavalese, Italy
20	1 July 1999	Saint-Étienne-en-Dévoluy cable car crash	Saint-Étienne-en-Dévoluy, France
19	1 June 1990	Tbilisi cable car crash	Tbilisi, Georgia
14	3 October 1999	Maling River Gorge cable car crash	Xingyi, Guizhou, China
14	23 May 2021	Stresa–Mottarone cable car crash	Mottarone, Italy
13	12 July 1972	Bettmeralp cable car crash	Bettmeralp, Switzerland
12	29 June 2017	Charra Pani cable car crash	Charra Pani, Galyat, Pakistan
11	13 February 1983	Champoluc cable car crash	Champoluc, Italy

=== Elevators ===
Deaths	Date	Incident	Location
104	10 May 1995	Vaal Reefs mining disaster: A locomotive crashed through a safety barrier and fell into a mine shaft, hitting an elevator which was carrying 104 workers, and causing it to plunge to the bottom of the shaft.	Orkney, South Africa
62	31 August 1987	A methane gas explosion at the St. Helena gold mine severed the cable of a double-deck elevator, causing it to fall 1.4 kilometers to the bottom of the mine shaft, killing all 52 people on board. 10 others who were not in the elevator were killed in the explosion.	Welkom, South Africa
31	27 March 1980	A descending elevator became stuck in the Vaal Reefs mine shaft and then fell to the bottom of the shaft when it abruptly became unstuck, killing all 31 miners on board.	Orkney, South Africa
19	13 September 2012	An elevator fell about 100 meters at a construction site, killing everyone on board.	Wuhan, China
19	10 October 1932	A mine-shaft elevator carrying 20 people fell at the Bickershaw Colliery, killing all but one person.	Leigh, England
18	30 July 1973	A mine-shaft elevator fell at the Markham Colliery.	Chesterfield, England
16	10 September 1918	Protection Island mining disaster: A mine-shaft elevator cable snapped causing the elevator to plunge to the bottom of the mine.	Protection Island near Nanaimo, British Columbia, Canada
13	27 November 2023	Impala Platinum mine shaft accident: a mine elevator fell 200m.	Rustenburg, South Africa
12	30 October 2008	An elevator plunged to the ground at a construction site.	Xiapu County, China
12	2 June 1993	An elevator plunged to the ground from the 20th floor at a construction site.	North Point, Hong Kong
11	25 April 2019	An elevator fell at a construction site due to a snapped cable.	Hengshui, China
11	29 July 2011	A mine-shaft elevator fell at the Bazhanov coal mine.	Makiivka, Ukraine
10	27 March 1964	A steel cable hit a mine-shaft elevator at the Sachsen coal mine, killing 10 workers, including 5 Turkish nationals.	Heeßen, West Germany
10	6 September 2014	An elevator plunged 32 stories at a construction site.	Istanbul, Turkey

=== Peacetime maritime ===
Deaths	Date	Incident
4,386+	20 December 1987	Doña Paz collided with the oil tanker MT Vector (in the Tablas Strait, Philippines). Casualty estimates vary because thousands of passengers were not listed on the manifest.
3,000–4,000	3 December 1948	SS Kiangya (Huangpu River, China) sank due to unidentified explosion, possibly a naval mine. Casualties estimated between 3,000 and 4,000
1,863	26 September 2002	MV Le Joola (Senegal) capsized off the coast of The Gambia. The majority of passengers were Senegalese and French, including 854 to 923 French-Senegalese dual nationals on board. There were 64 survivors.
1,500+	27 January 1949	Taiping (East China Sea)
~1,500	15 April 1912	Sinking of the Titanic (North Atlantic)
~1,500	6 February 1822	Tek Sing (near the Belvidere Shoals in the South China Sea)
~1,500	16 February 1993	Ferry Neptune (off Miragoane, Haiti)
1,169–1,547	27 April 1865	Sultana (Mississippi River). As the number of passengers is unknown, the total number of dead is also unknown.
1,153–1,172	26 September 1954	Tōya Maru (Tsugaru Strait, Japan)
1,000–1,100	c. 4 October 1744	HMS Victory (60 miles off Plymouth, England, near Black Rock)
1,021	15 June 1904	PS General Slocum (New York, United States)
1,012	29 May 1914	RMS Empress of Ireland (Saint Lawrence River, Quebec, Canada)
1,012	3 February 2006	MS al-Salam Boccaccio 98 (Red Sea)
1,000+	22 September 1912	SS Kiche Maru (off Honshu, Japan)
470–1,000	14 December 1991	MV Salem Express (Red Sea) struck a reef and sank within 10–20 minutes at midnight between 14 and 15 December, while on a voyage from Jeddah, Saudi Arabia to Safaga, Egypt. It had at least 644 passengers, the majority of whom were Moroccan-French. Most were returning from pilgrimage to Mecca. The official death toll was 470, though some evidence suggests that the ship was overcrowded and the true death toll may have been much greater.
970	22 April 1916	SS Hsin-Yu (Zhoushan, China)
~900	c. 3 March 1921	SS Hong Moh (South China Sea)
900	16 September 1927	Wusung (Kuril Islands, Empire of Japan)
894	21 May 1996	MV Bukoba (Lake Victoria, Tanzania)
852	28 September 1994	MS Estonia (Baltic Sea)
~850	24 December 1811	HMS St George (Ringkøbing, Denmark)
844	24 July 1915	SS Eastland (Chicago, Illinois)
829	15 February 1760	HMS Ramillies (Devon, England)
826	22 September 1857	Lefort (Gulf of Finland)
814	21 June 2008	MV Princess of the Stars (off Sibuyan Island, Philippines), capsized by Typhoon Fengshen
800+	29 August 1782	HMS Royal George (Portsmouth, England)
746	8 November 1888	SS Vaitarna (coast of Saurashtra, Gujarat, India), lost in cyclonic storm
745	12 December 1939	SS Indigirka (Sarufutsu, Japan)
741	26 November 1914	HMS Bulwark (1899) (Sheerness, England)
739	6 May 1902	SS Camorta (Irrawaddy Delta, Burma (now Myanmar))
~690	17 July 1947	SS Ramdas (off Bombay, India)
673	17 March 1800	HMS Queen Charlotte (Cabrera, Spain)
664	1 January 1738	Leusden (Marowijne, Suriname)
600–700	3 September 1878	SS Princess Alice and SS Bywell Castle (River Thames, England)
644	2 September 1819	San Telmo (Drake Passage, Antarctica)
627	28 June 1904	SS Norge (Rockall, North Atlantic Ocean)
617	29 October 1955	Novorossiysk (Sevastopol, Crimea)
600+	24 December 1811	HMS Hero, HMS Grasshopper and five civilian vessels (Haak Sand, near Texel, the Netherlands)
600+	3 September 1691	HMS Coronation (West of Penlee Point, Rame, England)
600	c. 16 September 1782 – c. 17 September 1782	HMS Glorieux (Newfoundland, Canada)
600	25 May 1986	1986 Bangladesh MV Shamia ferry incident (Meghna River, southern Barisa, Bangladesh)
583	24 December 1811	HMS Defence (Jutland, Denmark)
568	9 January 1920	SS Afrique (Bay of Biscay)
562	17 March 1891	SS Utopia (Bay of Gibraltar)
533–587	18 September 1890	Ertuğrul (Kushimoto, Japan)
550–562	1 April 1873	RMS Atlantic (Nova Scotia, Canada)
431–666	27 January 1981	Tampomas II (Java Sea). The total number of passengers - and thus fatalities - is unknown
530	8 July 2003	MV Nasrin-1 (Chandpur, Bangladesh)
520	15 May 1932	MS Georges Philippar (Gulf of Aden, Yemen)
520	14 April 1749	HMS Namur (Tamil Nadu, India)
~500	4 July 1898	SS La Bourgogne (Sable Island, Nova Scotia, Canada)
~500	29 June 2000	Cahaya Bahari (off Sulawesi, Indonesia)
500	c. April 1794	HMS Ardent (Villefranche-sur-Mer, France)
500	29 January 1986	Atlas Star (Dhaleswar River, Munshiganj, Bangladesh)
400–500	22 December 1810	HMS Minotaur (off Texel, Netherlands)
445+	5 March 1916	SS Principe de Asturias (off Brazil)

=== Rail ===
Deaths	Date	Incident	Location
900–1,700	26 December 2004	Sri Lankan tsunami train wreck	Galle District, Southern Province, Sri Lanka
500–1,500+	19 November 1998	Dancheon train disaster	Dancheon, North Hamkyung province, North Korea
800–1,000	13 January 1917	Ciurea rail disaster	Iasi County, Romania
700+	24 January 1944	Vereshchyovka train disaster	Oryol Oblast, Soviet Union
675+	12 December 1917	Saint-Michel-de-Maurienne derailment	Saint-Michel-de-Maurienne, Auvergne-Rhône-Alpes, France
600+	22 January 1915	Guadalajara train disaster	Guadalajara, Mexico
575	4 June 1989	Ufa train disaster	Ufa, Soviet Union
517–600	3 March 1944	Balvano train disaster	Balvano, Basilicata, Italy
428	13 January 1985	Awash rail disaster	Awash, Afar, Ethiopia
373+	20 February 2002	Al Ayatt train disaster	Egypt
385	14 March 1926	El Virilla train accident	Virilla River Canyon, Costa Rica
370	27 December 1944	Stará Kremnička derailment	Stará Kremnička, Slovakia
310	20 August 1995	Firozabad rail disaster	Firozabad, Uttar Pradesh, India
307	4 January 1990	Sukkur rail disaster	Sangi, Sindh, Pakistan
~300	21 June 1915	Military train derailment	Montemorelos , Mexico
300	7 January 1918	Changsha rail disaster	Changsha, China
300	22 September 1994	Tolunda rail disaster	Namibe Province, Angola
300	29 September 1957	Gambar train crash	Montgomery, Punjab, Pakistan
296	2 June 2023	Odisha train collision	Bahanaga, Baleshwar, Odisha, India
295+	18 February 2004	Nishapur train disaster	Nishapur, Iran
289	28 October 1995	Baku Metro fire	Baku, Azerbaijan
287	2 August 1999	Gaisal train disaster	Gaisal, West Bengal, India
281	24 June 2002	Igandu train disaster	Igandu, Tanzania
278	22 December 1939	Genthin rail disaster	Genthin, Germany
240–275	9 July 1981	1981 Chengdu-Kunming rail crash	Ganluo County, China
236	1 February 1970	Benavídez rail disaster	Benavídez, Argentina
235	6 June 1981	Bihar train derailment	Bihar, India
230	23 December 1933	Lagny-Pomponne Railroad Disaster	near Pomponne, France
226	22 May 1915	Quintinshill rail crash	Gretna Green, Scotland
212	26 November 1998	Khanna rail disaster	Khanna, Ludhiana, Punjab, India
208	4 October 1972	Train derailment	Saltillo, Coahuila, Mexico
207	28 July 1948	BASF tank car explosion	Ludwigshafen, Germany
200+	17 March 1982	Bau Ca train wreck	Dong Nai, Vietnam

=== Road ===
Deaths	Date	Incident	Location
230	2 July 2010	Sange road tanker explosion	Sange, South Kivu, DRC
219	25 June 2017	Bahawalpur explosion	Bahawalpur, Pakistan
215	11 July 1978	Los Alfaques disaster	Tarragona, Spain
209	15 October 2024	Majiya fuel tanker explosion	Majiya, Jigawa State, Nigeria
206	17 September 2015	2015 Juba tanker explosion	Juba, South Sudan
168–3,000	3 November 1982	Salang Tunnel fire	Salang Pass, Hindu Kush, Afghanistan
154	5 November 2021	Freetown fuel tanker explosion	Freetown, Sierra Leone
100–200	5 November 2000	Ibadan road tanker explosion	Ibadan, Lagos, Nigeria
122	15 February 1991	Thung Maphrao truck explosion	Thung Maphrao, Phang Nga, Thailand
121	12 July 2012	Okobie road tanker explosion	Okobie, Nigeria
111+	31 January 2009	Molo road tanker fire	Molo, Kenya
110	12 March 1995	Tamil Nadu truck collision	Sriperumbudur, Tamil Nadu, India
104	18 August 1968	Gero bus crash	Gero, Gifu, Japan
100+	6 December 1965	Sotouba truck collision	Sotouba, Togo
100+	18 January 2025	Suleja fuel tanker explosion	Near Suleja, Niger State, Nigeria
100+	10 August 2019	Morogoro fuel tanker explosion	Morogoro, Tanzania
99	28 March 2007	Kagarko truck explosion	Kagarko, Kaduna, Nigeria
81–115	6 January 1967	Cavite bus crash	Cavite, Philippines
96	12 July 1992	Machakos bus crash	Machakos, Kenya
73-115	17 November 2016	Caphiridzange tanker explosion	Caphiridzange, Mozambique
94	8 June 1999	Karnataka bus crash	Karnataka, India
90	15 November 1976	Mafeteng bus crash	Mafeteng, Lesotho
90	29 June 1980	Kashmir bus crash	Kashmir, India
90	24 June 2004	Zahedan bus crash	Zahedan, Iran
90+	14 December 2021	Cap-Haïtien tanker explosion	Cap-Haïtien, Haiti

=== Spaceflight ===
Deaths	Date	Incident	Location
6–300+	15 February 1996	Intelsat 708's launch vehicle veered off course immediately after liftoff and struck a nearby village. The official death toll is six people, although other estimates put it significantly higher.	Xichang Satellite Launch Center, Sichuan, China
78	24 October 1960	Nedelin catastrophe – a prototype R-16 ICBM exploded while it was still being prepared on the launch pad, killing, among others, lead Soviet official Mitrofan Nedelin.	Baikonur Cosmodrome, Kazakh SSR, Soviet Union
53	9 August 1965	Searcy missile silo fire – a Titan II ICBM caught fire whilst the silo it was in was being renovated.	Near Searcy, Arkansas, United States
48	18 March 1980	Plesetsk launch pad disaster – a Vostok-2M rocket blew up after being fueled up ahead of the launch.	Plesetsk Cosmodrome, Mirny, Arkhangelsk Oblast, Soviet Union
21	22 August 2003	2003 Alcântara VLS accident – the rocket ignited its engines onto the launch pad three days before the launch was scheduled, engulfing the nearby mobile launch tower in smoke and gases heated up to 3,000 °C (5,430 °F).	Alcântara, Brazil
7	28 January 1986	Space Shuttle Challenger disaster – the right SRB exploded 73 seconds into the flight due to a failed O-ring seal. The remains of the orbiter crashed into the Atlantic Ocean.	Offshore Florida, United States
7	1 February 2003	Space Shuttle Columbia disaster – a piece of foam from the shuttle's external tank struck the orbiter's left wing during liftoff, which later caused the orbiter to disintegrate during its reentry 15 days later.	Above Texas and Louisiana, United States
3	27 January 1967	Apollo 1's crew capsule was engulfed by a rapidly-spreading fire during a pre-launch rehearsal. Due to the plug door hatch design that was being used at the time, the astronauts could not be rescued from the capsule and were killed in the fire.	Cape Canaveral Air Force Station, Florida, United States
3	30 June 1971	Soyuz 11 uncontrollably depressurized in space prior to reentry. To date, these remain the only deaths that have occurred above the Kármán line.	Outer space
1	24 April 1967	Soyuz 1 crashed into the ground at 140 km/h (87 mph) due to a parachute malfunction.	Southeast of Orenburg, Russia
1	15 November 1967	X-15 Flight 191 broke apart ten minutes after launch of the suborbital test flight due to various technical difficulties.	Near Edwards Air Force Base, California, United States
1	31 October 2014	VSS Enterprise crash – the suborbital test flight disintegrated mid-launch due to the craft's air brake being prematurely deployed, killing one of the two test pilots onboard.	Mojave Desert, California, United States

== Other ==
=== Smog ===
Deaths	Date	Incident
4,000–12,000	5–9 December 1952	The Great Smog of London. The original death toll was 4,000 but later studies estimated it at 12,000.
2,200	1880	1870 London coal smog.
1,000	January 1956	1956 London smog.
780	December 1873	1873 London smog.
779	December 1892	1892 London smog.
700–800	December 1948	1948 London smog.
300–750	December 1962	1962 London smog.
300–405	January–February 1963	1963 New York City smog.
220–240	November 1953	1953 New York City smog.
168	23–25 November 1966	1966 New York City smog.
160	12–15 December 1991	1991 London Smog.

== See also ==
- Lists of death tolls
- List of natural disasters by death toll
