= Stresa–Mottarone cable car crash =

2021 cable car disaster in Piedmont, Italy

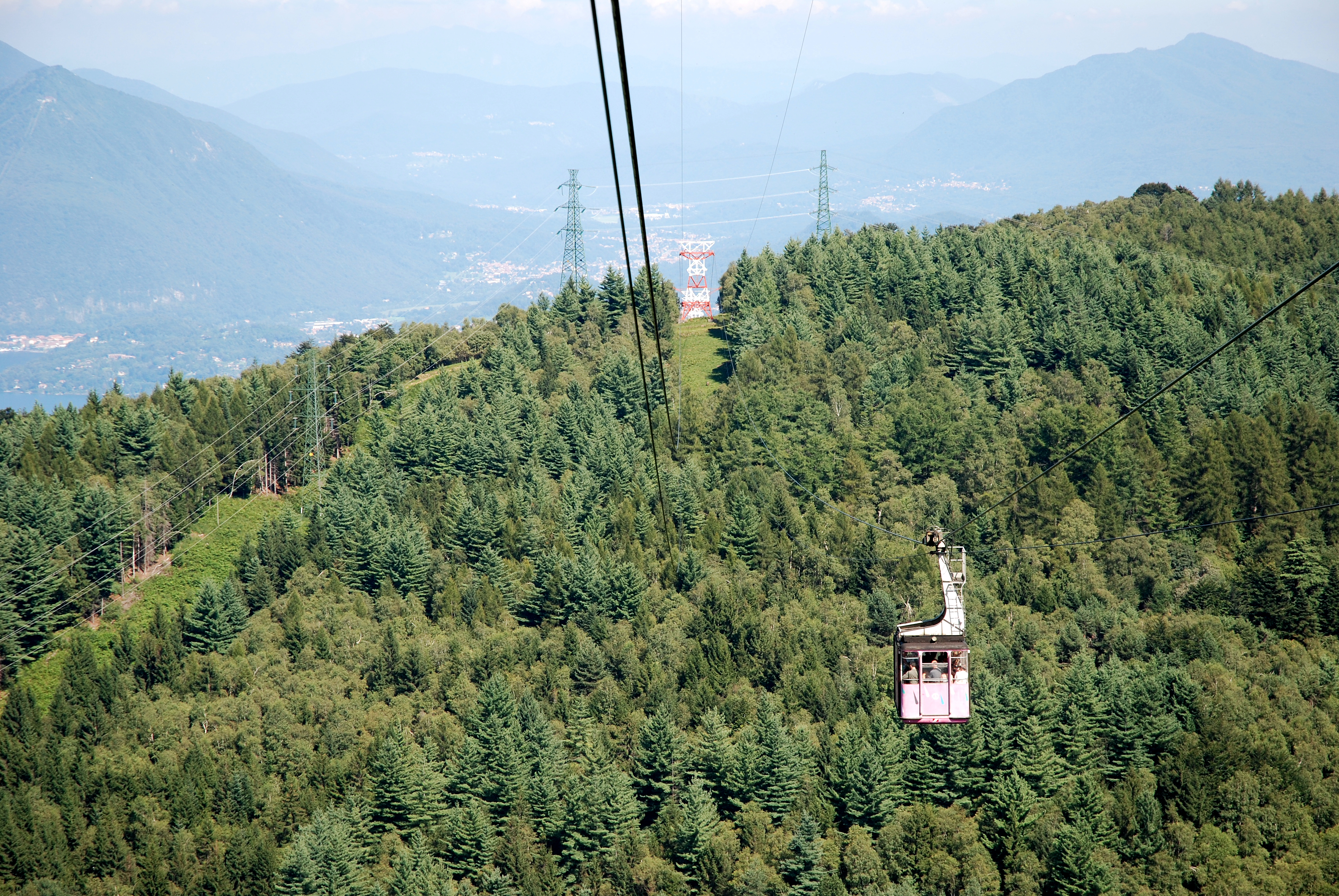
- A Stresa–Mottarone cable car in 2009
- Date: 23 May 2021
- Time: 12:22 CEST (UTC+02)
- Location: Mottarone, Piedmont, Italy; 45.8835°N 8.4658°E
- Cause: Illegal deactivation of emergency brakes.
- Deaths: 14
- Injuries: 1

On 23 May 2021, an aerial tram on the Stresa–Alpino–Mottarone Cable Car crashed to the ground after a haulage cable snapped about five metres (16 ft) from the summit of Mottarone, a mountain near Lake Maggiore in northern Italy. Normally, a hydraulic safety brake would have stopped the runaway car immediately, but the cable car was operating illegally with the brake disabled. The crash killed fourteen passengers in the cable car, and seriously injured one child.

== Background ==
The Stresa–Alpino–Mottarone Cable Car is an aerial tramway, a form of cable line in which cabins are suspended from a fixed cable and hauled by a separate traction cable to which they are permanently attached, with cabins shuttling backwards and forwards instead of running in a continuous loop. The Stresa–Mottarone line had two separate sections, each with two cabins, and passengers changed cabins at the mid-point station of Alpino, between the Stresa and Mottarone stations.

Construction work for the cable car began in 1967, carried out by the firm Poscio, under the guidance of architect Mario Cracchi from nearby Baveno. Cable-car-specific construction was carried out by Piemonte Funivie from Turin. The original cables were produced by Westfälische Drahtindustrie GmbH in Hamm, Germany. The last upgrade of the Stresa-Mottarone aerial tramway cars took place in 2002, undertaken by Poma Italia. The cables were replaced from 2014 until 2016 by Leitner Ropeways. With Leitner, Poma had been part of the HTI Group since 2000.

In a press release, Leitner, which had carried out maintenance on the cable car in the years prior to the incident, published details of maintenance work and safety checks performed on the cable car, stating that they had been carried out according to the current safety regulations and the maintenance contract. The company stated that all cables, including the carrier cables, were checked with magnetic induction in November 2020, and the automatic brake was tested with both cabins in December 2020; the test involved a simulated rupture of the haulage cable. From 29 March to 1 April 2021, Leitner employees checked all mechanical safety components, and the hydraulic brakes of the vehicles were checked and maintained on 3 May. The company also stated that daily and weekly checks and maintenance were carried out by the transport company itself, in adherence to the issued user's manual.

The cable car had not been operating for a period of time until 26 April 2021 as a result of restrictions due to the COVID-19 pandemic. The cable car was designed for a carrying capacity of 47 people, but the cabin capacity had been reduced as a COVID-19 precaution. 15 people were on board when the accident happened.

== Accident ==
The deadly crash occurred at 12:22 p.m. local time, as a cabin was ascending on the line's upper section from the middle station at Alpino towards the summit of Mottarone. When the haulage cable snapped, in very close proximity to the summit station at low speed, the cabin careered downhill until it collided with a pylon, then fell about 54 meters (180 ft) before tumbling down the steep slope of the mountain, stopping after impacting trees. Footage captured by a surveillance camera from the summit station depicted the cabin suddenly and violently being pulled backwards at the moment the cable snapped while approaching the platform. Hikers reported hearing a loud hiss shortly before the crash, believed to have been caused by at least one of the cable lines snapping. Some of those who died were thrown from the cabin as it tumbled. Television imagery later showed the snapped, thinner traction cable hanging from the pylon.

== Casualties ==
Thirteen people died at the scene of the accident, while two children were seriously injured and airlifted to a pediatric hospital in Turin. One of the children later died of cardiac arrest, bringing the death toll to fourteen. The deceased victims were identified as eight Italian nationals (of whom three were from Vedano Olona, two from Varese, two from Bari, and one from Cosenza), an Iranian male national, and a three-generation family of five Israeli nationals. The only survivor was the Israeli family's five-year-old son.

The crash was Italy's deadliest cable car incident since the 1998 Cavalese cable car crash.

Victim	Nationality	Date of birth	Age
Tal Peleg Biran	Israel	13 August 1994	26
Amit Biran	Israel	2 February 1991	30
Tom Biran	Israel	16 March 2019	2
Barbara Konisky Cohen	Israel	11 February 1950	71
Itshak Cohen	Israel	17 November 1939	81
Mohammadreza Shahaisavandi	Iran	25 June 1988	32
Serena Cosentino	Italy	4 May 1994	27
Silvia Malnati	Italy	7 July 1994	26
Alessandro Merlo	Italy	13 April 1992	29
Vittorio Zorloni	Italy	8 September 1966	54
Elisabetta Personini	Italy	9 July 1983	37
Mattia Zorloni	Italy	9 August 2015	5
Angelo Vito Gasparro	Italy	24 April 1976	45
Roberta Pistolato in Gasparro	Italy	23 May 1981	40

== Investigation ==
On 26 May 2021, three employees of the cable-car company were arrested. One of the three worked as a freelancer for the company but was an employee of Leitner Ropeways, the company in charge of regular maintenance work on the cable car. According to police, they had intentionally deactivated the automatic emergency brake, as a malfunction had repeatedly led to the halting of the cabins.

After the service resumed on 25 April, the cable car showed “anomalies”. The cable car had been travelling in that way for several days and had made several trips. Technical checks were performed, including a check on 3 May 2021 to “remedy inefficiencies”, but they had not been “decisive” in resolving issues, investigators said. Based on photos from the disaster site, experts have been able to determine that at least one of the gondola's brakes had been disabled with a steel clamp, which is usually employed during specific maintenance activities. If the emergency brakes had been functional, they would have held the cabin steady after the cable snapped. The move was made "in the belief that a cable breakage could never have happened". The operations manager admitted that the emergency brake had been manipulated. Due to continuing hydraulic oil leakage, which apparently was not repaired, repeated spurious activation of the emergency brake occurred and, to maintain the operation of the cable car, they deactivated the emergency brake.

It is still not certain what caused the haulage cable to snap, which is the primary cause of the crash. The corresponding report from the experts is expected on 30 June 2022. According to one of the experts involved, the traction cable had rusted from the inside – because a routine maintenance measure that should have been carried out every three months was omitted for five years. In other words, maintenance negligence also seems to have been involved.

Whilst the technical safety investigation by the Ufficio per le Investigazioni Ferroviarie e Marittime (IFeMa) (Office of Rail and Maritime Investigations) is ongoing, the Direzione Generale (Director General) (DiGIFeMa) has published 3 safety recommendations in an interim report dated 23 May 2022. These 3 recommendations require various safety checks and inspections to be reported to Safety Authorities and that they are properly and formally recorded.

Images provided by a Swiss cable car technician and shared by him on YouTube show that the Stresa–Mottarone cable car had previously been operated with passengers aboard, with emergency brakes disabled, in 2014 and 2018.

Several other cable car disasters have occurred in the past due to an intentional deactivation of emergency brakes, including the 1990 Tbilisi aerial tramway accident and the 1999 Saint-Étienne-en-Dévoluy cable car crash.

== Aftermath ==
By 30 May 2021, all three employees were released from prison, with two of the three being found not culpable and the third being sentenced to house arrest. As of 21 November 2021, the third employee, Gabriele Tadini, was released from house arrest after 6 months.

== Media controversy ==
In June 2021, Italy's public broadcaster, RAI, aired CCTV footage of the incident on its news programme. Shortly after, it was republished in full on other media outlets in Italy. The case prosecutor, local Mayor Marcella Severino, politician Valeria Fedeli and head of public broadcast Marcello Foa expressed condemnation over the broadcast of the footage and urged companies and individuals to stop sharing it.

== See also ==
- Cable car accidents and disasters by death toll
