= 2008 Congo football riots =

Riot

Date	14 September 2008
Location	Butembo, Nord-Kivu, Democratic Republic of the Congo 0°09′N 29°17′E
Result	13 people dead, 36 injured

On Sunday 14 September 2008, a riot broke out in connection with a football game in Butembo, in the province of Nord-Kivu, in the eastern part of the Democratic Republic of the Congo. The teams playing were Socozaki and Nyuki System, which are two local clubs whose games are considered derbies. The riots were sparked by accusations that one of the football players was using witchcraft. Nyuki were losing the game, and their goalkeeper tried to advance up the pitch and cast a spell that would turn the game around. This caused a brawl between the players, and when a police commander tried to intervene, he was pelted by stones from the spectators. To regain control of the situation, the police forces reportedly fired canisters of tear gas into the crowd, an action that caused a stampede.

On the next day, dozens of teenagers staged a protest in the town. The regional governor, Julien Paluku Kahongya, attended the funerals and visited the injured in hospital, and promised a full investigation of the events. He reported that the firing of shots into the air by the police had caused panic, and the deaths were then caused by the ensuing mass flight. 13 people were killed by suffocation, while 36 others were injured. With two or three exceptions, the victims were all children; most were between the ages of 11 and 16. An eleven-member team has been set up to study the incident by the local regime.

Reports of the events came from the local UN-funded radio station Radio Okapi. Nord-Kivu has been the scene of widespread conflict between Congo government forces and rebels in recent years, and a great number of people have been displaced. Despite the fact that the Second Congo War officially ended in 2003, violence is still raging in this part of the country. Traditional animist beliefs are still strong in this part of Africa, and exist side by side with Christianity and Islam.

== See also ==
- Football hooliganism
- Football War
