= Maling River Gorge cable car crash =

Cable car accident

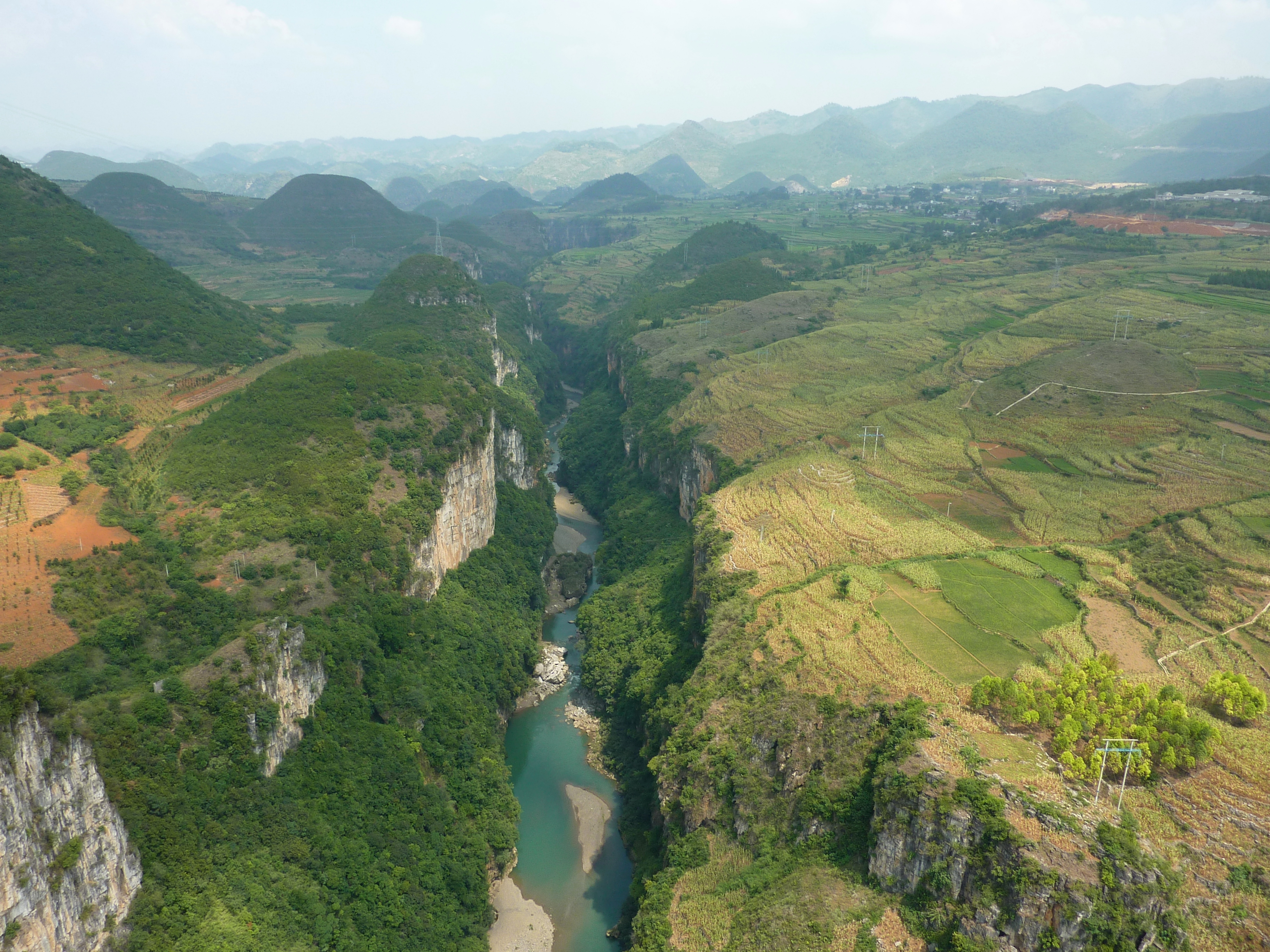
Maling River Gorge

The Maling River Gorge cable car crash occurred on 3 October 1999 in the Maling River Canyon Scenic Area, Xingyi, Guizhou Province, China. A cable car fell from a mountain top platform to the bottom of a 40-meter-high valley, killing 14 and injuring 22.

The crash occurred during the commemoration holiday of the founding of the PRC in 1949 (National Day of the People's Republic of China). According to reports, 36 people were inside the cable car, which was designed only for 10. On the morning of the accident, over 200 tourists were in the vicinity, and the primary organizers of the holiday outing were the Guangxi China Travel Service, Tianma, and Sunshine Travel Agency. Shortly before noon, the tourists entered the cable car. The car was at a height of 100 meters, but then slid down on the cable. At around a height of 50–60 meters, the cable snapped and the car fell into the valley. Five passengers inside the cable car were killed in the initial accident, and nine others died in the aftermath. Cell service in the area was poor, and so communications were hampered. However, the operator of the cable car failed to summon assistance when the accident occurred, and then after contacting police, failed to relay the seriousness of the situation. Other tourists from the groups organized the initial rescue efforts. Reaching the disaster site was challenging for rescue workers, as there were only two primary routes into the valley.

The incident came to be known as the "10.3" cable car crash, and focused attention on the safety culture inside the tourist industry. Because of the potential economic benefits, there is considerable interest in the development and usage of aerial cable cars in China's tourist areas. However, safety standards are not always followed, and proper training is sometimes lacking. Six people were detained in connection with the accident.

== See also ==
- Cable car accidents and disasters by death toll
