= Stresa–Alpino–Mottarone Cable Car =

2-stage cableway in Stresa, Italy

Coordinates: 45°53′5.97″N 8°29′47.26″E

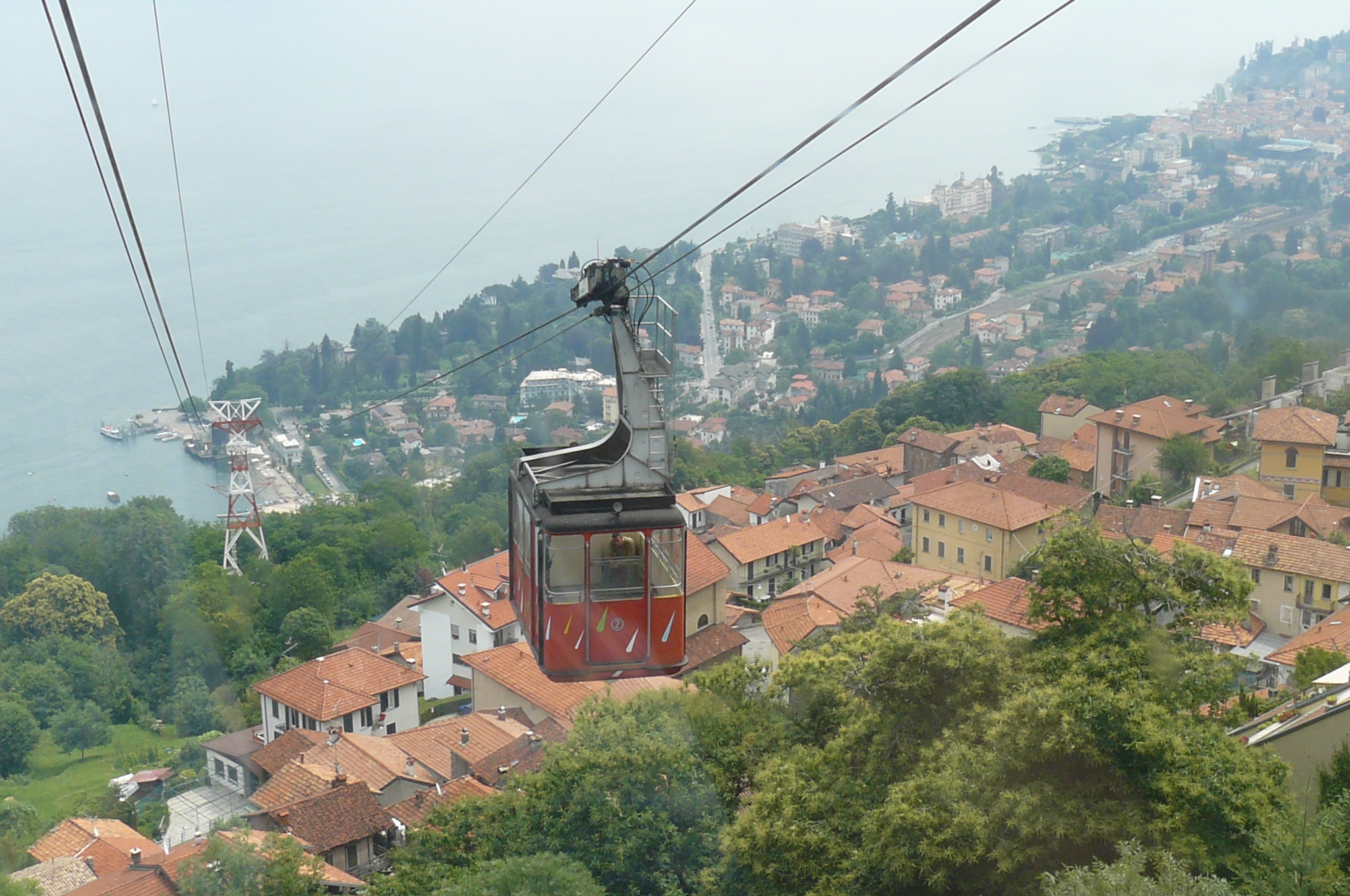
The Stresa-Alpino-Mottarone Cable Car moving over Stresa in 2009

The Stresa-Alpino-Mottarone Cable Car (Italian: Funivia Stresa-Alpino-Mottarone) was an aerial tramway cable transport located in the commune of Stresa in the Piedmont region of Italy. First opened in 1970, the aerial tramway connects Stresa, located on the shores of Lake Maggiore, to the summit of the Mottarone mountain. The Stresa-Alpino-Mottarone Cable Car transported approximately 100,000 passengers per year, prior to the COVID-19 pandemic in Italy. The aerial tramway was a major regional tourist attraction until the Stresa-Mottarone cable car disaster on 23 May 2021; it has remained closed ever since.

== Route ==
The Stresa–Alpino–Mottarone Cable Car began at the Lido di Carciano piazza on the shores of Lake Maggiore in Stresa. The tramway then ascended approximately 2,625 feet (800 metres) to the village of Alpino, where an intermediate cable car station was located adjacent to this Giardino Botanico Alpinia. The second half of the Stresa–Alpino–Mottarone Cable Car continued from Alpino to a station just below the summit of Mottarone, a mountain peak in the Western Alps. From the Mottarone, passengers could board a short chair lift ride to the mountaintop.

Without stops, the trip from Lido di Carciano at Lake Maggiore to the top of Mottarone took about twenty minutes and rose 1385 metres.

== History ==
The Stresa-Alpino-Mottarone Cable Car was opened to the public on 1 August 1970, following three years of construction. The aerial tramway replaced the historic Ferrovia Stresa-Mottarone, which operated from 1912 until its closure on 13 May 1963.

The cable car system had undergone a 4.4 million euro renovation and general overhaul between 2014 and 2016. New control panels, engines and passenger cabins were installed at the time. The renovations were funded jointly by the Piedmontese regional government and the town of Stresa. The cable car was closed for construction work in 2014 and reopened on 13 August 2016.

Each of the Stresa–Alpino–Mottarone's stations were also renovated between October 2016 and December 2016.

The number of passengers in each cable car was limited to 40 or less during the COVID-19 pandemic in Italy.

=== Accidents ===
Prior to 2021, the Stresa-Alpino-Mottarone Cable Car system had not experienced any serious accidents during its first 50 years of service. There had been three minor incidents when passengers had to be evacuated from the cable cars due to cable entanglements, but there had been no injuries at the time.

On 23 May 2021, during a scheduled trip, the Stresa-Alpino-Mottarone Cable Car crashed to the ground after the traction or haulage cable snapped about 5 metres (16 ft) from the summit of the mountain Mottarone, killing fourteen people.
