= 2014 Patna stampede =

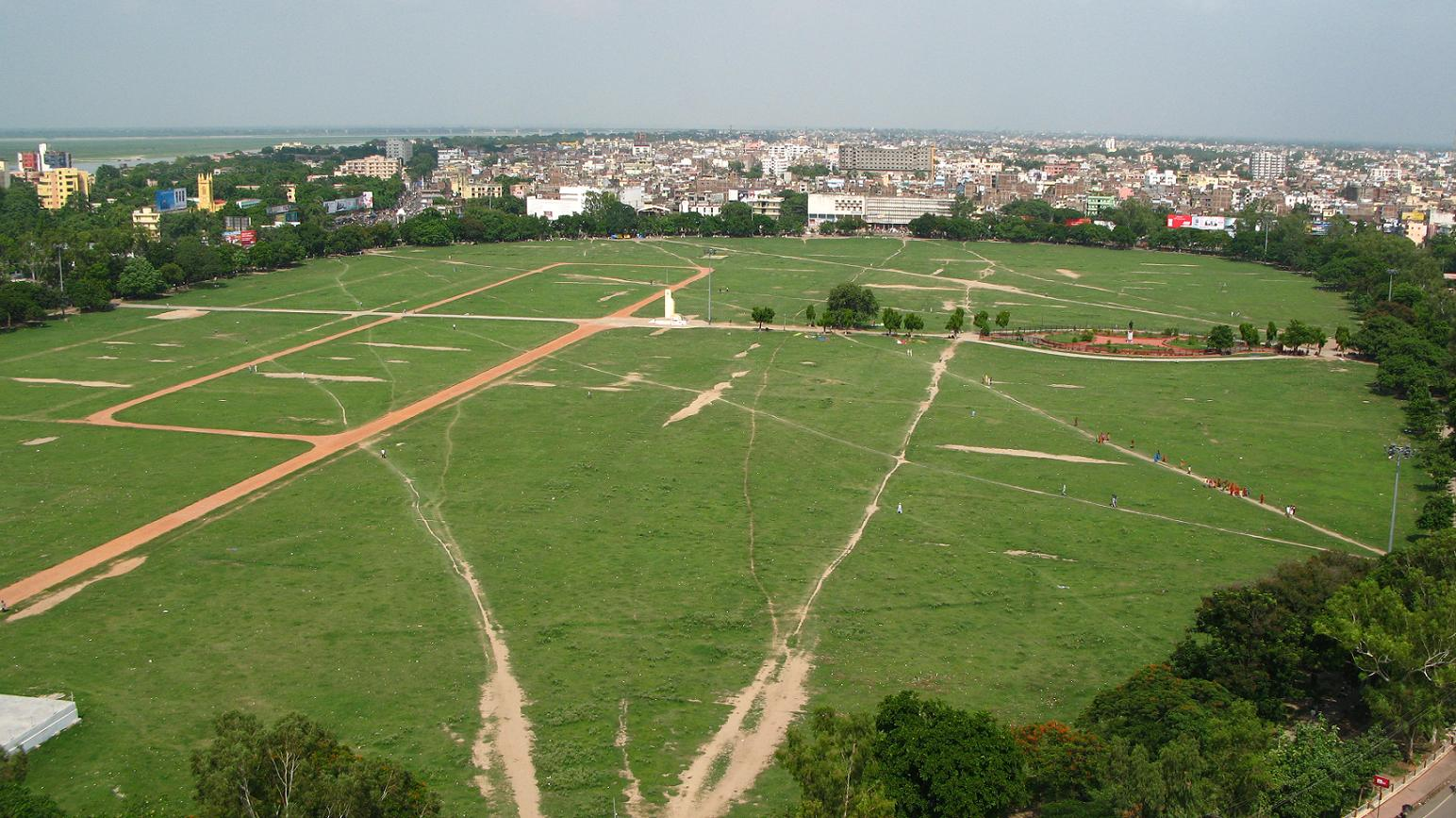
- Gandhi Maidan, where the incident took place
- Date: 3 October 2014
- Location: Patna, Bihar, India
- Deaths: 32
- Injuries: 50+

2014 Patna stampede was an accident that occurred on 3 October 2014 on the occasion of Dassehra festival at Gandhi Maidan in Patna, Bihar.

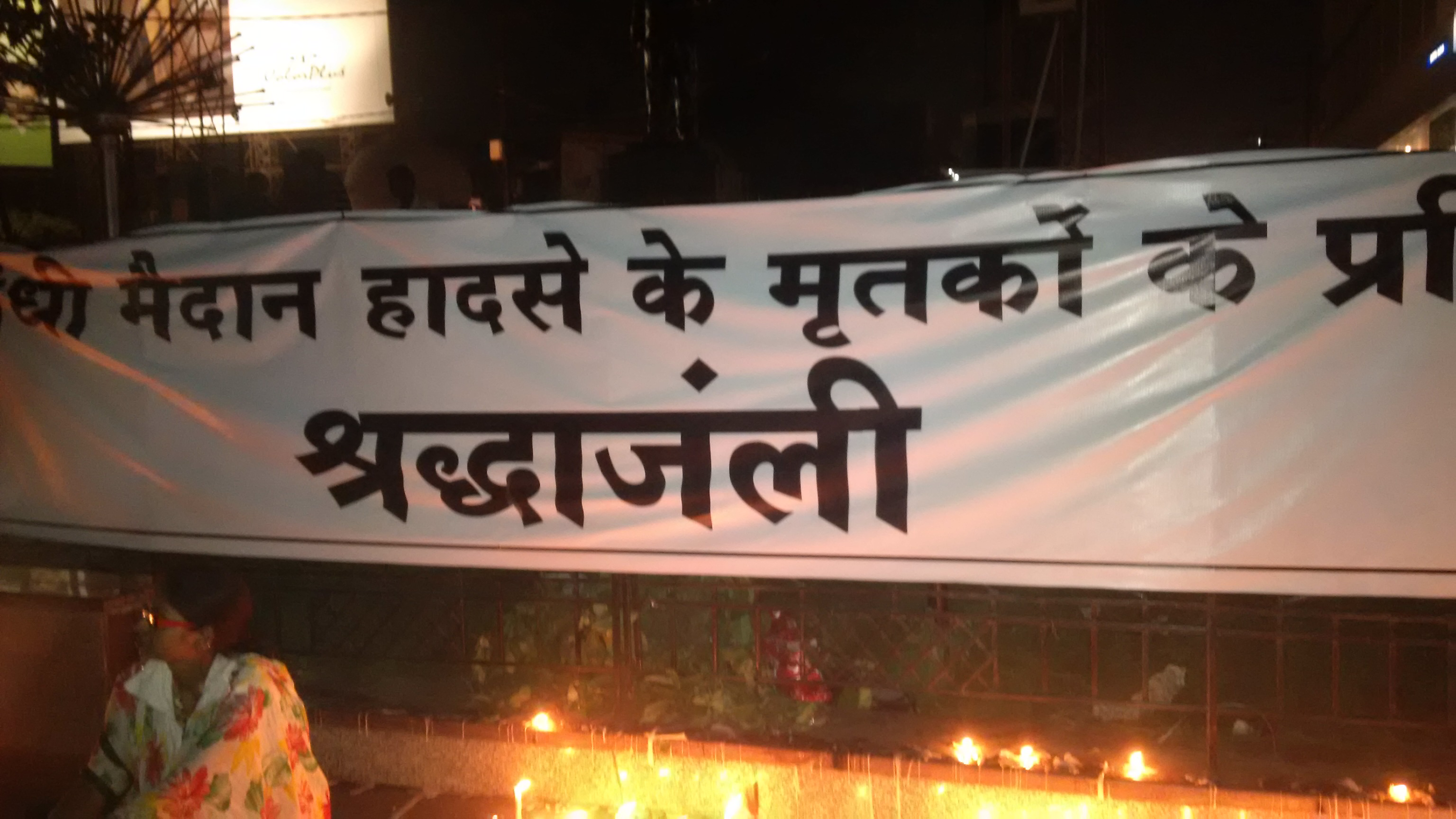
Candlelight vigil near Gandhi Maidan, one day after the stampede incident

== Background ==
The incident occurred when people were returning after watching the "Ravan Vadh" ceremony at the Bihar capital's main Dussehra event at Gandhi Maidan where a huge crowd had gathered to witness the event. Reportedly, 32 people died in the stampede.

== Reaction ==
Prime Minister of India Narendra Modi spoke to the Bihar Chief Minister to inquire about the stampede. He sanctioned ₹2 lac each for the next of those killed and ₹50,000 for critically hurt.
