= Bolevec Disaster =

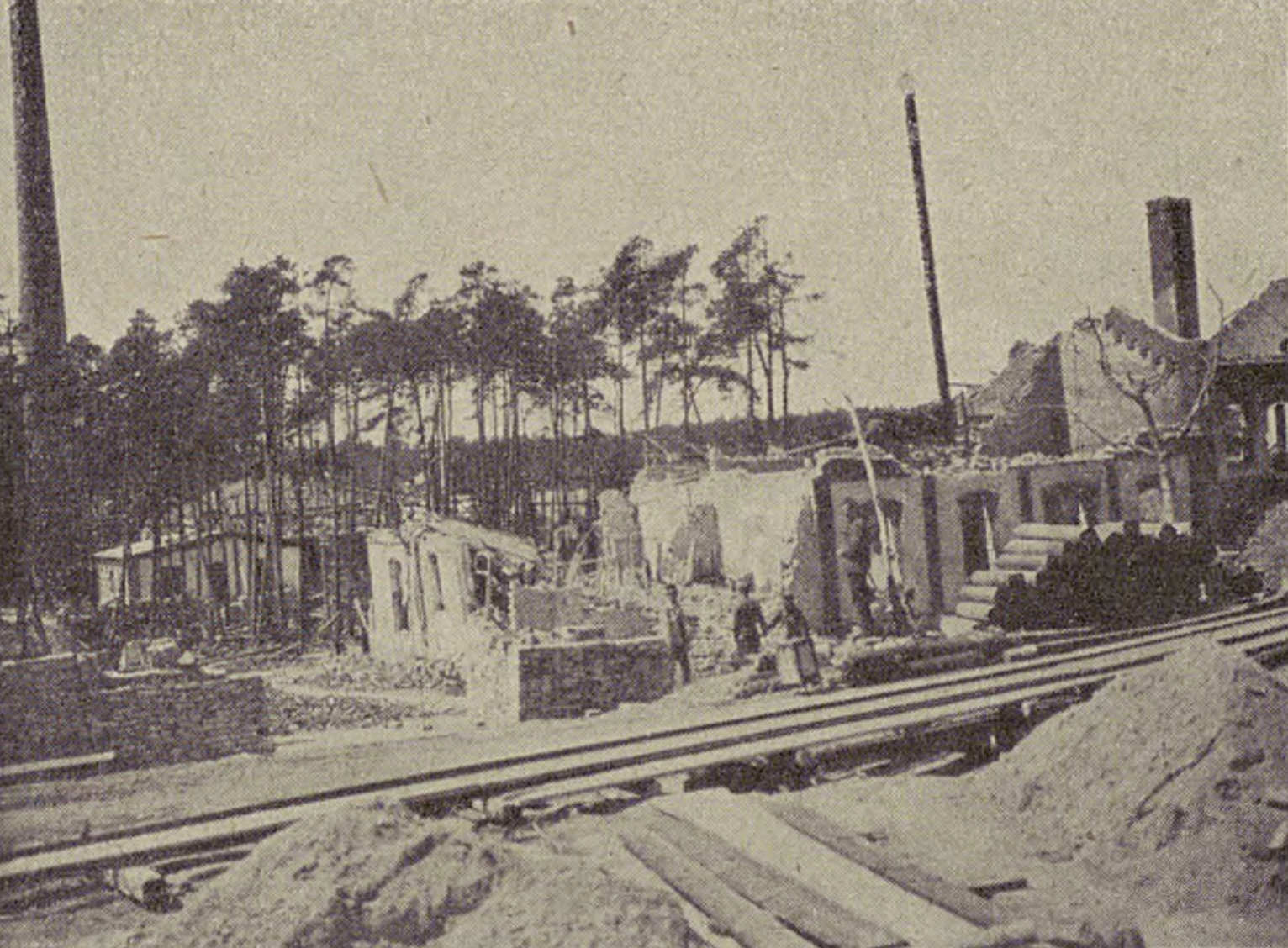
Ruins of a firing station in Škoda ammunition factory in Plzeň-Bolevec, May 1917

The Bolevec Explosion or Bolevec Disaster was a safety incident that occurred during World War I on 25 May 1917 in Škoda Works ammunition plant in Bolevec (today part of Plzeň), the biggest ammunition producing facility in former Austria-Hungary. An explosion, probably caused by a single defective land mine, started a massive chain reaction of other explosions with a death toll of at least 143 people and hundreds wounded and crippled.

== Škoda ammunition factory ==
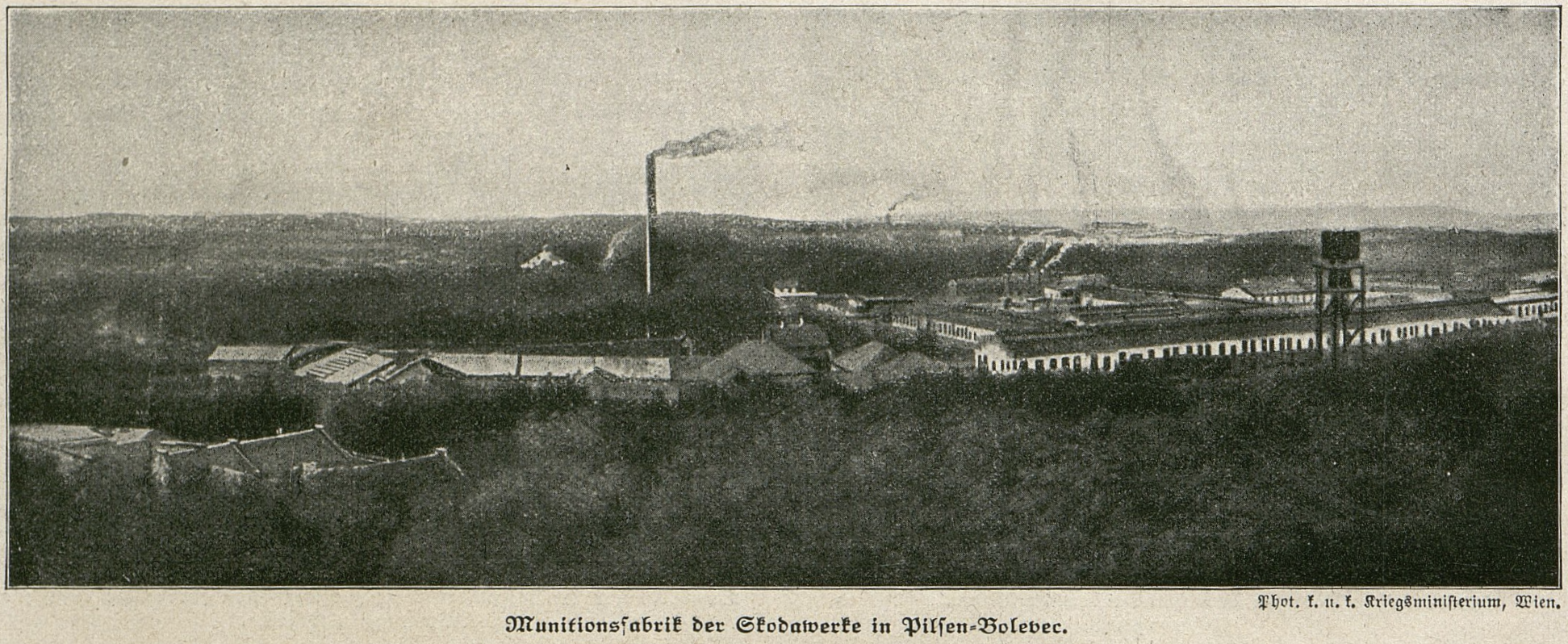
Škoda ammunition factory in Plzeň-Bolevec (c. 1917)

At the beginning of World War I, Škoda engine and armor company was one of the biggest in the country. Except of producing own designed artillery pieces (field guns, mortars or howitzers), in 1901 the company built a new facility out of the factory area, in Bolevec, at that period about 6 kilometers from Plzeň, which because of war production became the largest ammunition plant in the Austro-Hungarian Empire. Demands of the ammunition production by the army pushed Škoda company to rapidly extend the facility size at the expense of safety or hygienic rules, as proper permits and regulations for the industrial objects built or storage of a huge amount of ammunition at the same area. Before the incident Škoda ammunition factory employed more than 3,000 people producing about fifty types of ammunition pieces in the 37–305 mm caliber range.

== Explosion ==
At 25 May 1917, 2,580 own workers (862 men and 1,718 women) and 354 constructional workers were present in the area. In the noon hours Vojtěch Žižka, worker in the Building No. 10 disposed for an assembling of landmine of the new type, reported a defective piece. The information even reached Ing. Rudolf Thiel, director of the plant, but he did not show any attention to it.

Between 1:35 and 1:45 p.m. an explosion of one of the landmines occurred in Building No. 10, killing a few people. Because of the packages of TNT stored in the same house multiple another blasts smashed the building down and provoked other following ones. All of the workers became to run in panic out, but this strategically important military facility was protected by a barbed wire fences, watchtowers and locked gates, which crucially complicated the evacuation. The main explosion occurred at 2:50 p.m. creating the pressure wave about six kilometers wide, also breaking many windows in the very centre of Plzeň. Blasts continued till the evening hours.

== Aftermath ==
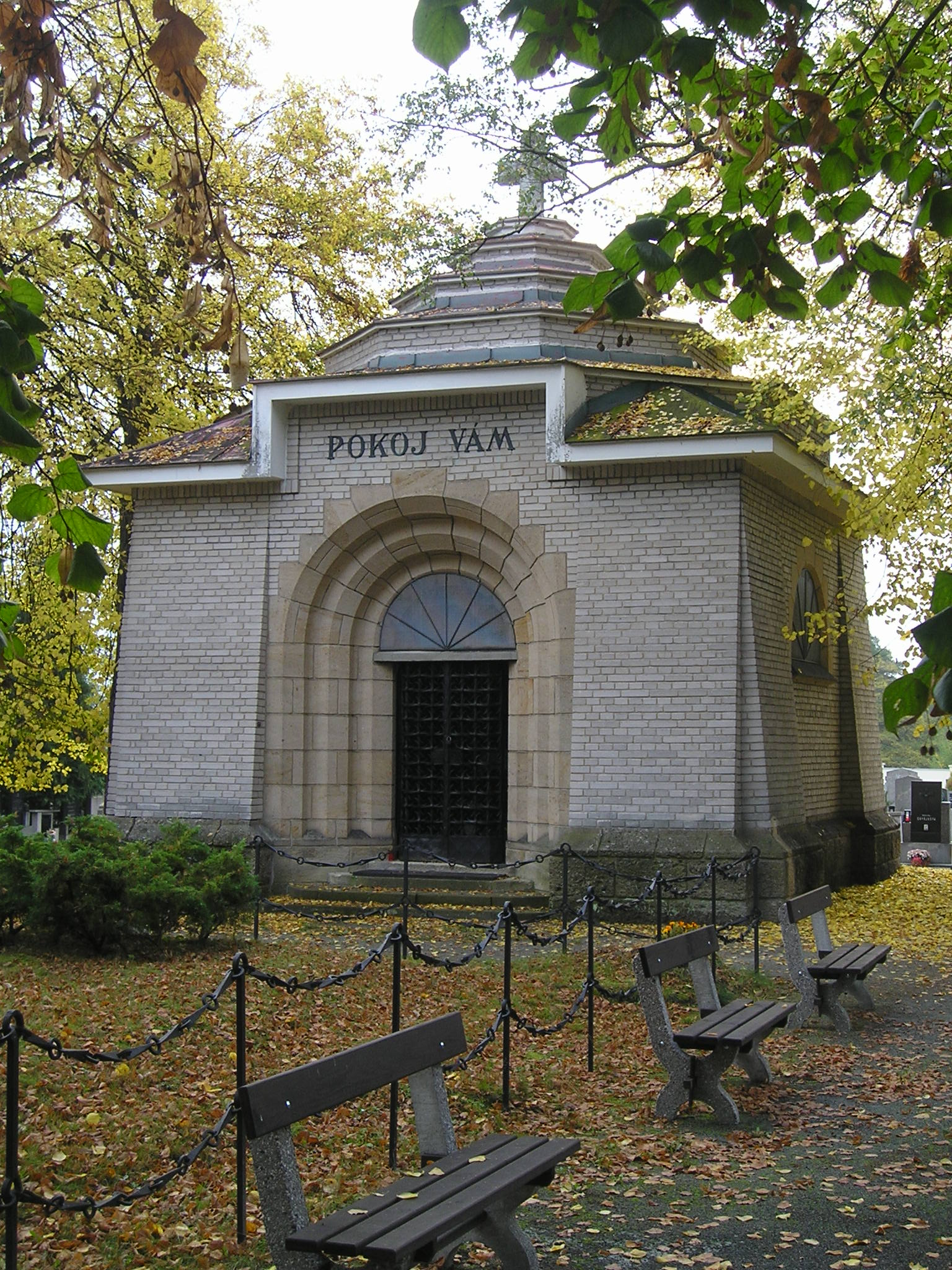
Chapel of St. Adalbert at Bolevec Cemetery

Despite the imminent danger, many volunteers rushed inside the factory area to help the injured, facing the danger of additional ammunition blasts. Final number of people killed by the explosions has increased to 146. 143 of the victims were buried in a mass grave dug on the nearby Bolevec cemetery, 3 remaining were buried in their family graves. On 29 May the main funeral ceremony was set with burying of 53 bodies, other coffins were added in the next days as the bodies were discovered during the deconstruction works. The funeral with a personal presence of Archduke Karl Albrecht was strictly guarded by the army and the k.k. Gendarmerie due to a possibilities of riots. In the Austro-Hungarian press just a minimal reflection was allowed by the censors.

Some other sources claim, that the number of victims was even higher, more than 202 and about 700 wounded.

On the top of the mass grave is the Chapel of St. Adalbert. It was built by the design of Austrian architect Robert Oerlych.

Investigation revealed the fact of a report of Vojtěch Žižka, who died as one of the firsts, which the factory executives ignored. Factory director Rudolf Thiel was charged, but in 1918 he shot himself in his flat due to a defraudation affair.

The factory was of such importance that it was decided to rebuild it as soon as possible, but the Plzeň city council protested and demanded the factory be rebuilt on a smaller scale and with much higher safety standards. The factory was ultimately built on a significantly smaller scale, although contemporary sources often speak of its reconstruction according to the original project.

== Memory ==
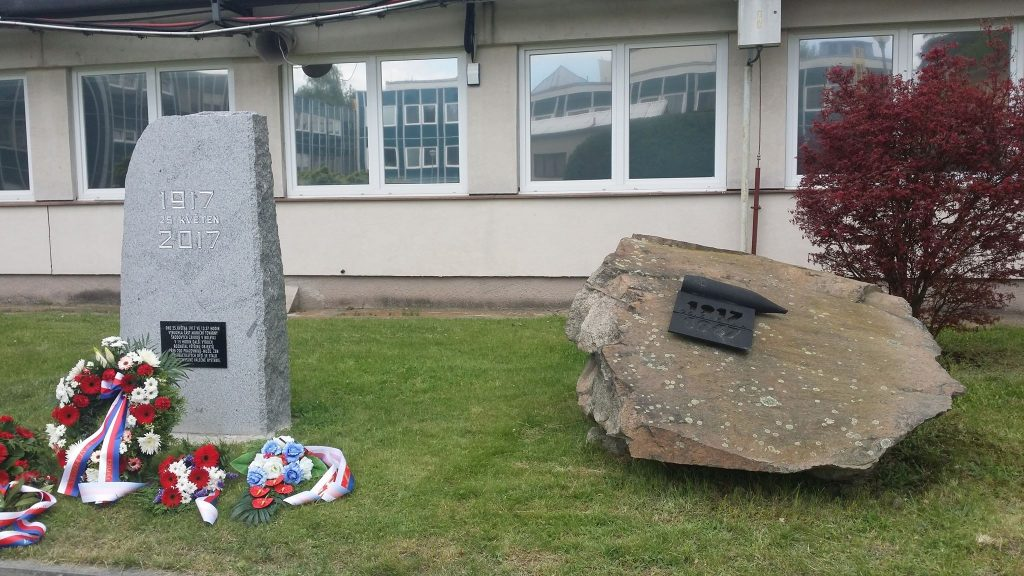
Memorials of the accident in Škoda JS facility

In 1967 a memorial monument was erected in the area of the Škoda factory, which was after 1950 rebuilt for another industrial use of the company. A new memorial was placed just next the old one in 2017 at the 100th years anniversary of the event.

== In art ==
The Bolevec Disaster inspired Czech writer Karel Čapek, who witnessed the event during his work stay at Chyše Chateau, to create the novel Krakatit published in 1924.

== See also ==
- History of Austria-Hungary during World War I
- Largest artificial non-nuclear explosions

== Bibliography ==
- Jakubec, Ivan (2 April 2024). The Economic Rise of the Czech Lands 1. Prague: Karolinum Press. p. 228. ISBN 9788024638065.
- Bauerová, Marie (1998). Bolevecká katastrofa v roce 1917 (in Czech). Documenta Pragensia. ISBN 80-86197-02-6.
