= Mottarone =

Mountain in Italy

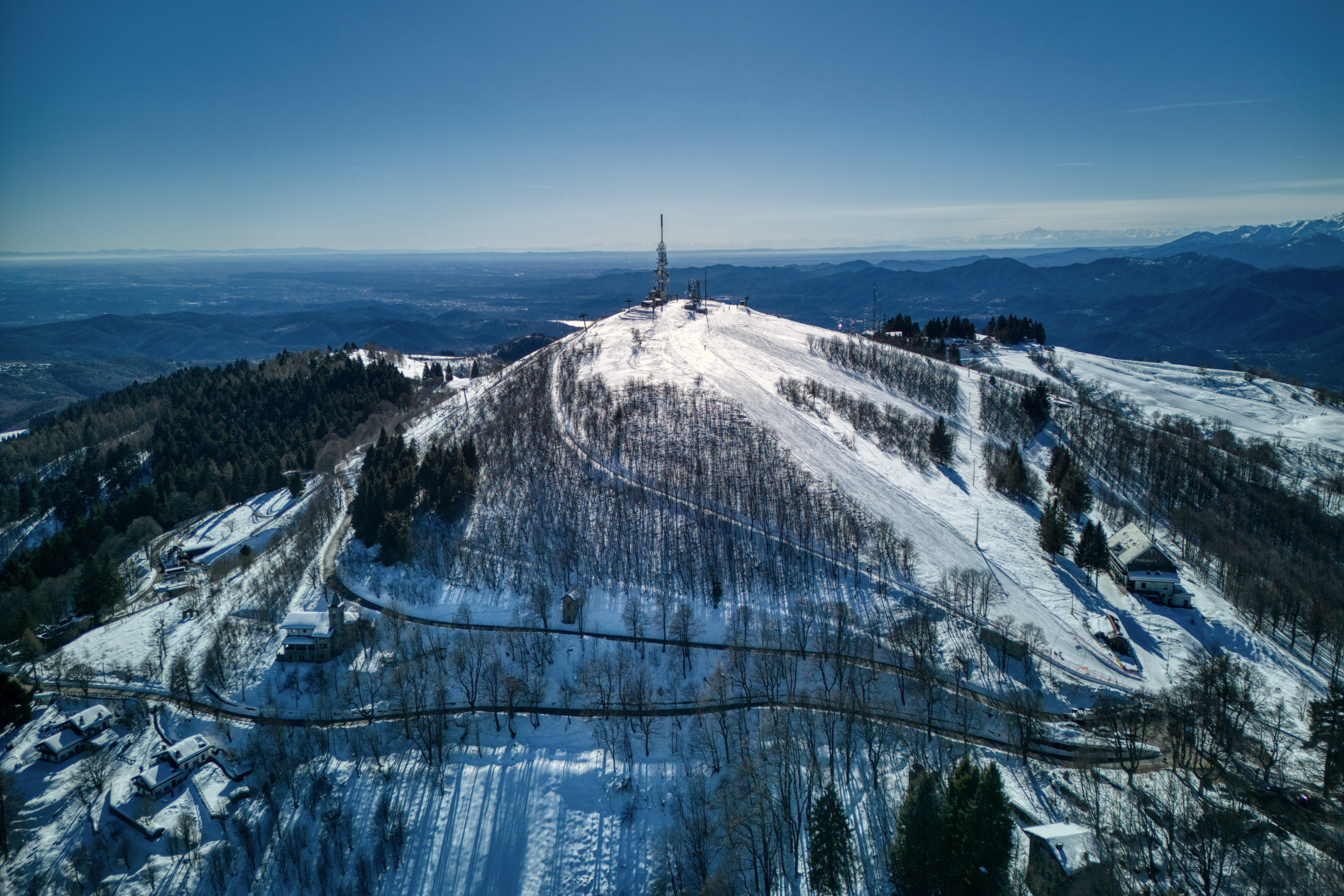
- The peak of Mottarone

Highest point
- Elevation: 1,492 m (4,895 ft)
- Prominence: 1,130 m (3,710 ft)
- Isolation: 20.28 km (12.60 mi)
- Listing: Mountains of Italy
- Coordinates: 45°52′49″N 08°27′04″E

Geography
- Location within Alps Location within Italy
- Country: Italy
- Provinces: Verbano-Cusio-Ossola and Novara
- Parent range: Pennine Alps

Mottarone is a mountain in the Western Alps of Piedmont, north-western Italy, with an elevation of 1,492 metres (4,895 ft). It is located between the provinces of Verbano-Cusio-Ossola and Novara.

== Geography ==
The peak is in the communal territory of Stresa, between Lake Orta and Lake Maggiore. The source of the Agogna river is located in the mountain.

The Mottarone area is known for the production of cheese, the most renowned of which is the Toma del Mottarone.

=== SOIUSA classification ===
According to the SOIUSA (International Standardized Mountain Subdivision of the Alps) the mountain can be classified in the following way:

- main part = Western Alps
- major sector = North Western Alps
- section = Pennine Alps
- subsection = Southern Valsesia Alps
- supergroup = Alpi Cusiane
- group = Massiccio del Mottarone
- code = I/B-9.IV-B.4

== Access to the summit ==
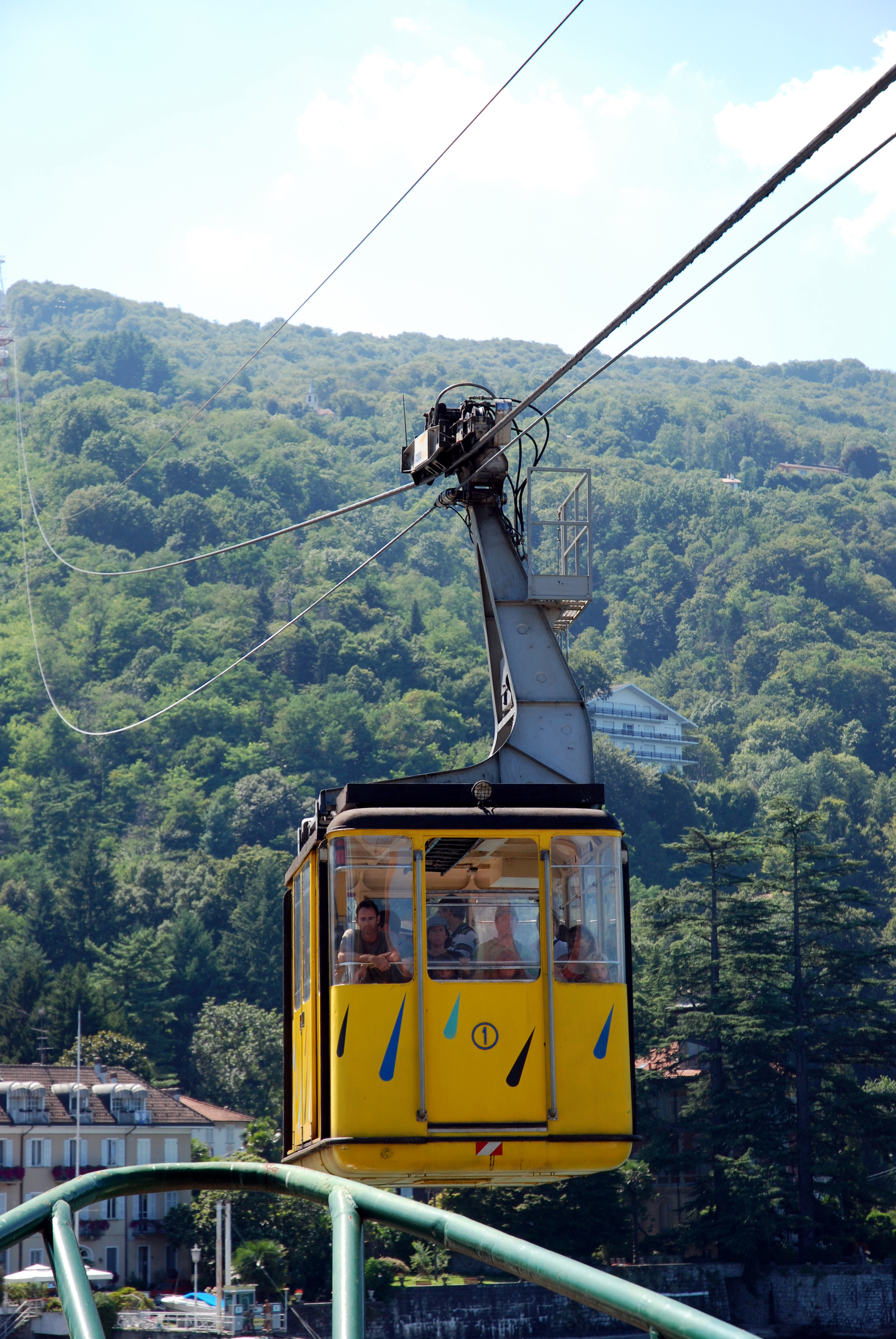
Mottarone cableway

Prior to May 2021 the peak of Mottarone could be reached by a 20-minute ride on the Stresa-Alpino-Mottarone Cable Car cableway from Carciano, a frazione of Stresa. This was built to replace a rack and pinion railroad from Stresa in 1963. It overlooks the city of Verbania on Lake Maggiore; Monviso in the Maritime Alps, as well as Monte Rosa, can be seen on clear sky days. This can't be done anymore after the Stresa–Mottarone cable car crash

It is possible to reach the peak of Mottarone by car. There are two roads: the first comes up from Armeno, west of the Mottarone summit near Lake Orta; the second, a private toll road, begins from Alpino, a frazione of Stresa on the eastern side of the summit.

On foot, it's possible to reach the summit using path L1 from Stresa (designated CAI Stresa), which passes near the railway station. The suggested time to the summit is 4:20 from the station.

== 2021 cable car accident ==
On 23 May 2021, a cabin of the Stresa–Alpino–Mottarone Cable Car which was carrying fifteen people fell into a wooded area of the mountainside near the summit, killing fourteen people and injuring another.

== Winter sports ==
A ski resort with 21 km (13 mi) of downhill skiing slopes is located on Mottarone.

Skiing on Mottarone has a long tradition. Sci Club Mottarone was founded in 1909. In January 1935 the first giant slalom in ski racing history took place on the Mottarone. In 1940 the first ski lift opened called, Slittone. After World War II, the ski resort developed. Today there are 21 trails, something for every kind of skier. There are five ski lifts: Baby, Selva Spessa 1, Selva Spessa 2, La Rossa and Baita Omegna. In addition, there are two moving carpet lifts (tapis-roulants) for beginners. Unfortunately, another lift called Alpe Corti, was closed after 2011 at the end of its "technical life", following Italian law which allows certain lifts to be used only 30 years.
