= Rough Riders (roller coaster) =

Former roller coaster at Coney Island, Brooklyn, New York

Coordinates: 40.5747°N 73.9801°W

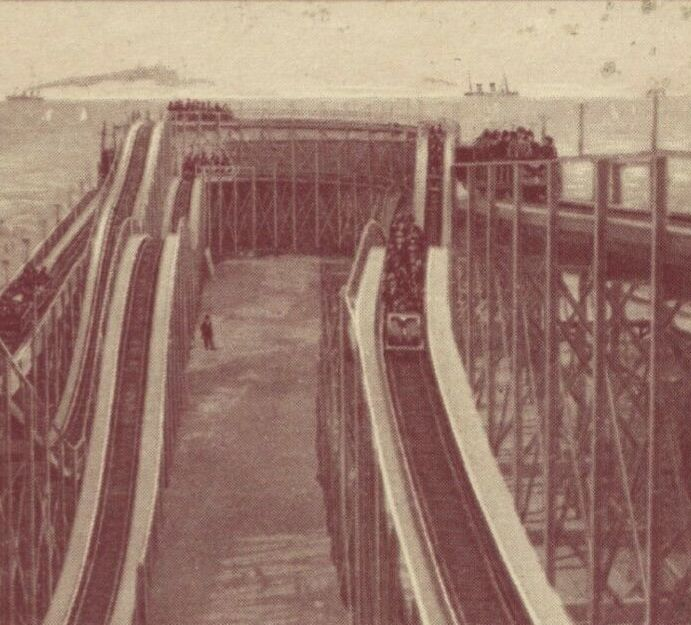
- Opening date: 1907
- Closing date: 1914-1916

General statistics
- Type: Wood
- Manufacturer: William F. Mangels
- Designer: Harry Traver
- Height: 4,200 ft (1,300 m)
- Rough Riders at RCDB

Rough Riders, also known as Over the Rockies, was a roller coaster built by William F. Mangels and located on Bowery Street in New York City's Coney Island from 1907 to 1916. It was known for its many accidents which led it to its closure.

== History ==
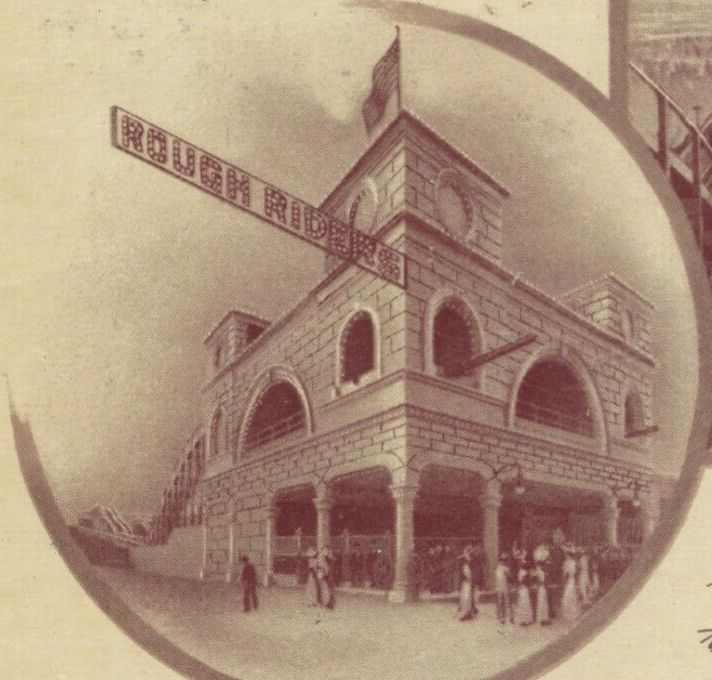
Entrance to Rough Riders

W.F. Mangels installed his Rough Riders roller coaster on the Bowery and Jones Walk in 1907. The ride was a "switchback railway," similar to Coney Island's first roller coaster from 1884. The ride began at the top of a hill, not at ground level, and reached a chained lift hill later on in the ride. It was a third rail electric roller coaster, in which the ride's operator turned off all electric power after the initial ascent. However, when the mechanism broke or the operator failed to turn it off, it would cause the ride to go at speeds too fast and overturn. Three people died on June 22, 1910, and when the train derailed again in 1915 and caused three more deaths, it was decided that the ride should be shut down. On the ride, people went past scenes from the Spanish–American War and ride workers wore Spanish–American War uniforms.
