= Charra Pani =

- Village
- Country: Pakistan
- Province: Punjab
- District: Murree
- Time zone: UTC+5 (PST)

Charra Pani is a hill station in the Murree District of the Punjab province of Pakistan.

== Location ==
It is located about 15 km from Islamabad, the capital city of Pakistan, route to Murree and Galyat. A fairly fast water stream runs through the park. Water here is usually very cold as it originates in the hills. People from the twin cities of Rawalpindi and Islamabad often visit this place.

== History ==
British troops were stationed here during the British Raj. In 1857 during the uprising against British rule, Sardar Sherbaz Khan and his sons were killed here after being captured.

== 2017 cable car incident ==
On 29 June 2017, at least twelve people were killed and two others injured when an overloaded cable car broke free from its cable and fell 500 feet into a ditch. The cable car was reportedly carrying fourteen people, greater than its maximum capacity of eight. An eyewitness claimed that there were high winds at the time of the accident, which caused the cable car to detach from the cable it was traveling on.
