= Saint-Étienne-en-Dévoluy cable car crash =

Cable car disaster in Saint-Étienne-en-Dévoluy, France

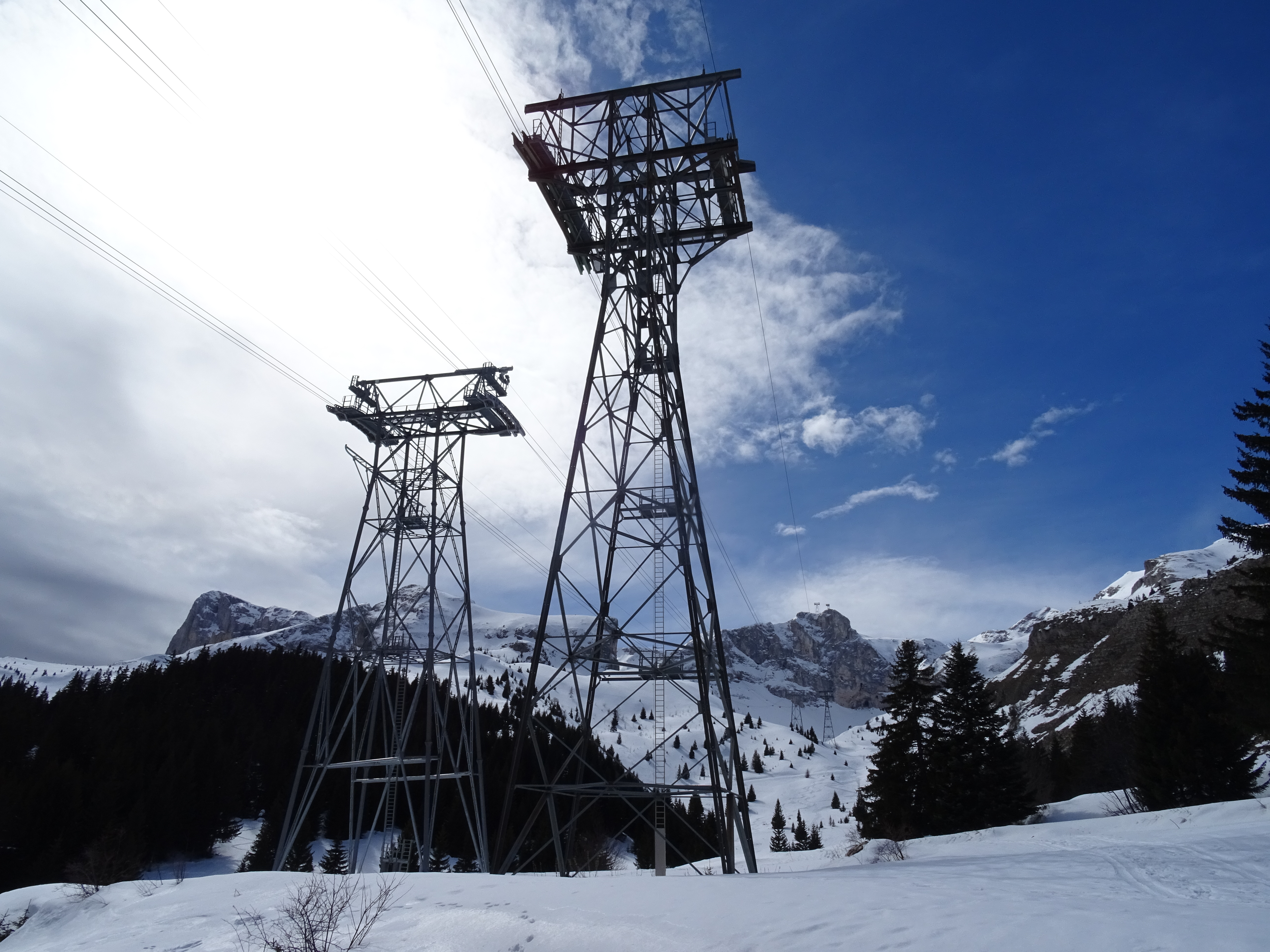
- The aerial tramway (on right) leading to the Plateau de Bure Interferometer, where the accident took place.
- Date: 1 July 1999
- Time: 07:15 local time
- Location: Saint-Étienne-en-Dévoluy, France; 44°38′02″N 05°54′29″E
- Cause: Excessive speed due to maintenance error.
- Deaths: 20 (all on board)

The Saint-Étienne-en-Dévoluy cable car crash occurred on 1 July 1999 in Saint-Étienne-en-Dévoluy, France, when a cabin which was being operated on a privately owned aerial tramway detached from the cable it was traveling on, and fell into the valley below. The accident killed all twenty people on board. The death toll was equal to that of another cable car accident in Italy which had occurred one year previously. The disaster remains the deadliest cable car accident in France, and one of the deadliest such incidents anywhere in the world.

== Accident details ==
In the early morning hours of 1 July 1999, twenty staff members who worked at the Plateau de Bure Astronomical Observatory boarded a gondola which was serviced by an aerial tramway owned by the company. All twenty people on board the gondola were of French nationality, and included five observatory staff, nine construction workers, four technicians, and two maintenance workers. At approximately 07:15 local time, when the cable car had traveled 500 metres (1,600 ft) from its starting point, the car detached from the cable and plunged 80 metres (260 ft) onto the rocky slopes of the valley beneath it. The cable car disintegrated on impact, killing everyone on board.

== Aftermath ==
According to the chief representative of the cable car company, Jean-Charles Simiand, the aerial tramway was built in 1981. He said that it was "working in perfect order" prior to the accident, as it had recently passed an inspection. Simiand indicated that Apav, a private engineering firm, had carried out the last major inspection of the cable car in 1998. During the inspection each part of the cable car was evaluated, including the cabin, cables, motors, and pylons. He stated that major inspections of the gondolas take place every five years once they are commissioned.

Witnesses reported that it seemed as though one of the cables holding the car had snapped. Local officials stated that the gondola broke free from two of the three cables which supported it, causing the third cable to collapse. However, the prefect of the Hautes-Alpes region, Rémi Caron, told a press conference that it seemed as though the car unhooked itself from the cables for an unknown reason.

Initially, the state prosecutor demanded a six month prison sentence for eight maintenance workers at the observatory, for their contributing roles in the accident. However, nearly five years after the accident, the court acquitted five maintenance workers at the observatory of charges related to their actions which contributed to the accident.

The Plateau de Bure Astronomical Observatory was fined €200,000 ($209,700 USD), of which €130,000 ($136,305 USD) were later dropped.

Three maintenance workers at the observatory were convicted on negligence charges. Aldo Oberti was the maintenance engineer who removed the safety brake from the cable car, allowing it to accelerate uncontrollably along the cable and slip off it. The long retired and terminally ill Oberti received an effectively symbolic 30 month suspension from cable car operations (which was later reduced to 24 months), and was also ordered to pay a €10,000 ($10,485 USD) fine for his role in the accident. Édouard Ponchier, the cable car inspector, also received a 30 month suspension from operations, as well as a five year ban from being allowed to inspect cable cars. Ponchier was also fined €12,000 ($12,582 USD).

In addition, Marinus de Jonge, the former director of the Plateau de Bure Astronomical Observatory, received the same sentence as Ponchier, along with a €15,000 ($15,728 USD) fine.

== See also ==
- Cable car accidents and disasters by death toll
