= Iruka-ike Dam =

Dam in Aichi Prefecture, Japan

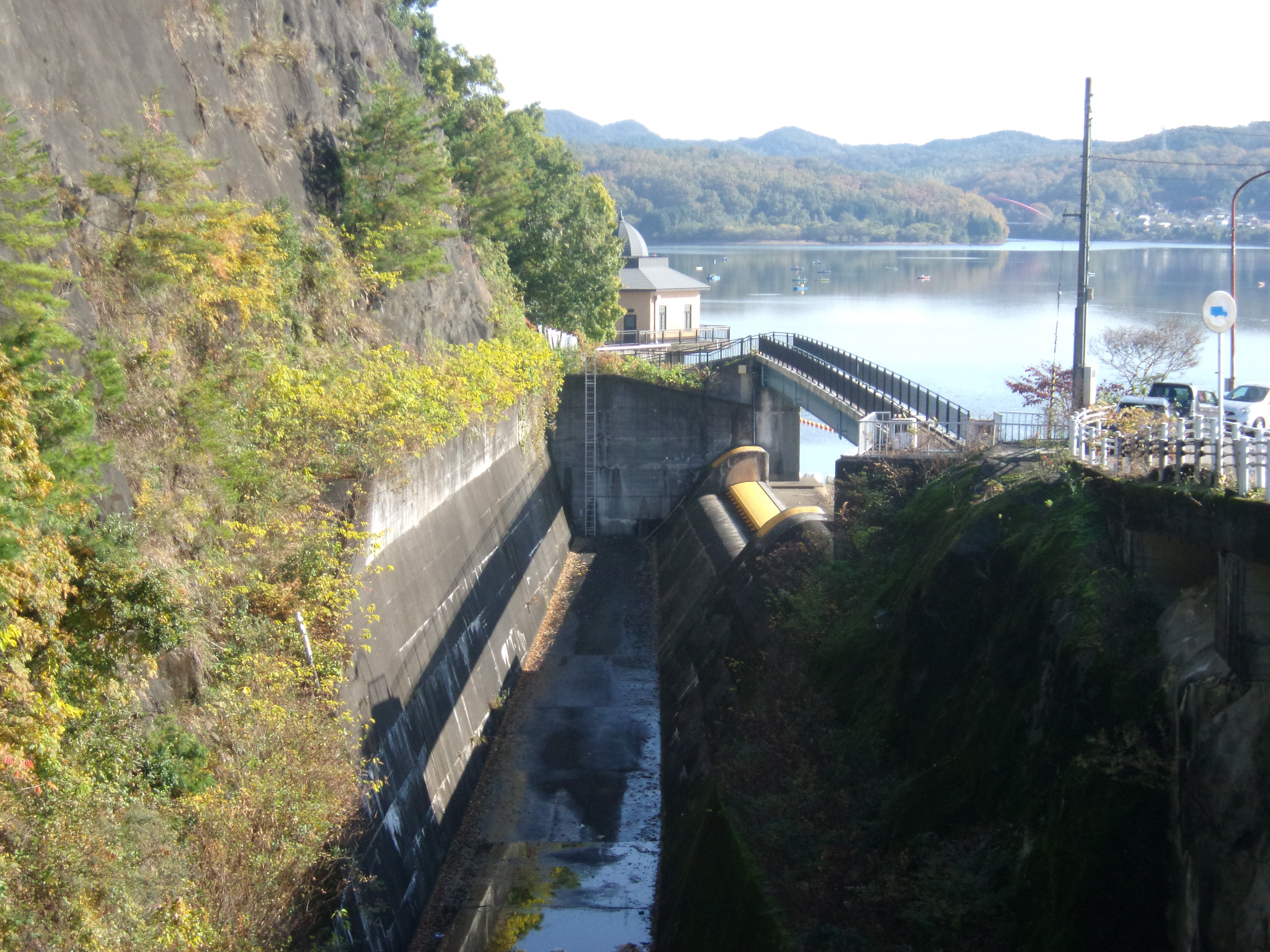

- Location within Japan
- Interactive map of Iruka-ike Dam
- Location: Aichi Prefecture, Japan
- Coordinates: 35°20′11″N 136°59′34″E
- Construction began: 1978
- Opening date: 1991

Dam and spillways
- Height: 25.7 m (84 ft)
- Length: 724.1 m (2,376 ft)

Reservoir
- Total capacity: 18479 thousand cubic meters
- Catchment area: 34.4 sq. km
- Surface area: 152 hectares

Iruka-ike Dam(入鹿池) is an earthfill dam located in Aichi Prefecture in Japan. The dam is used for flood control and irrigation. The catchment area of the dam is 34.4 km^{2}. The dam impounds about 152 ha of land when full and can store 18479 thousand cubic meters of water. The construction of the dam was started on 1978 and completed in 1991.
