= Marie mine disaster =

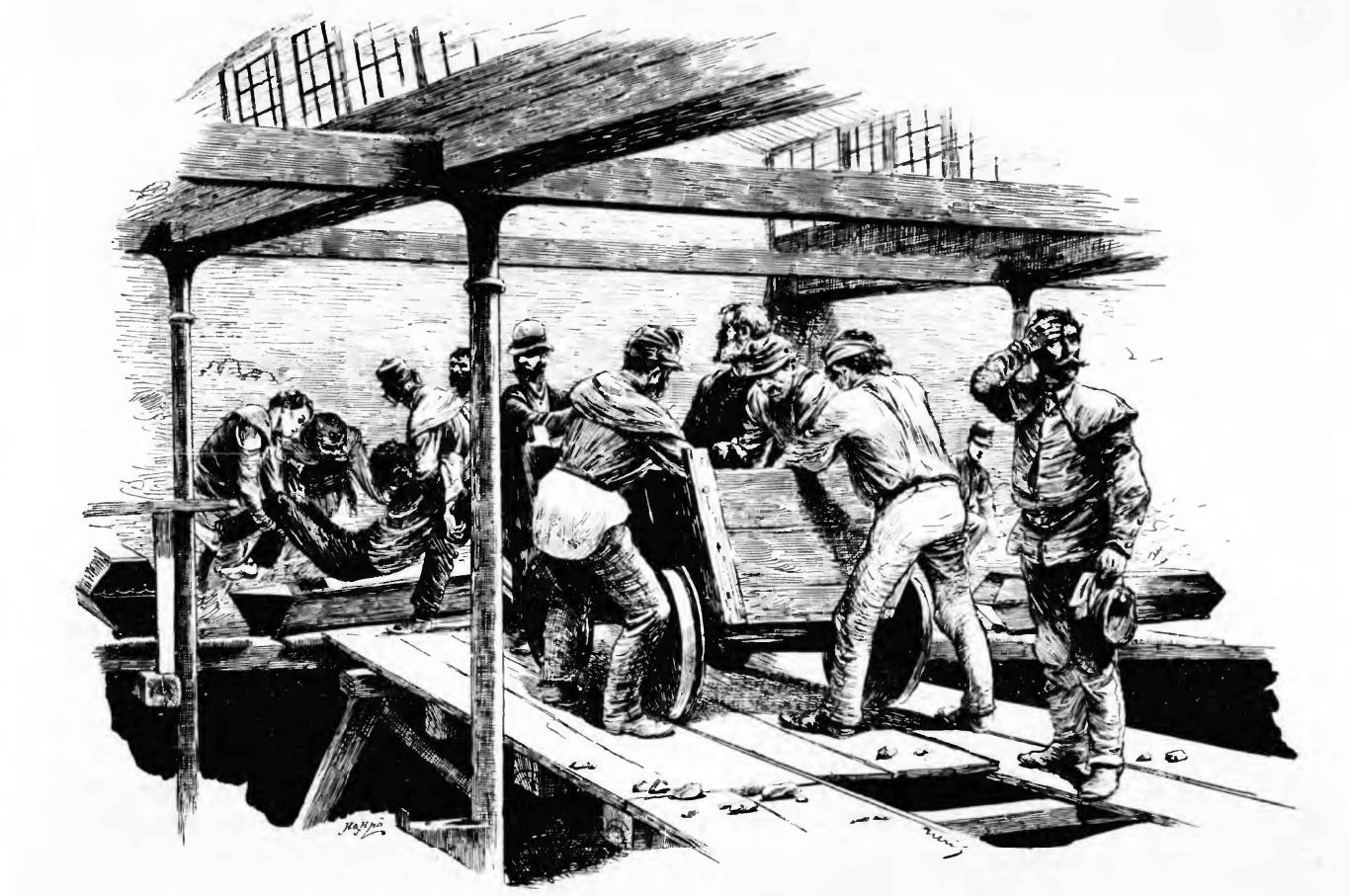
- Illustration of recovery efforts
- Date: 31 May 1892
- Location: Příbram, Austria-Hungary
- Deaths: 319

The Marie mine disaster (31 May 1892) was a fire in the Marie ore mine in Příbram, present-day Czech Republic, which killed 319 miners. It is considered the worst mining disaster in Czech history and one of the deadliest in the world.

== Event ==
The fire started in the Marie mine on 31 May 1892 at approximately 1pm, and subsequently spread toxic fumes to the neighboring Anna, Prokop, Vojtěch and Franz Josef I mines. Some miners died immediately, while others had time to write letters to their families. Rescue work largely concluded around 7pm. By the afternoon of 1 June, some miners were still underground and alive; most could not be saved but at least one miner was rescued on that day. Overall, 319 miners died and 516 survived, with most victims dying of smoke inhalation.

== Cause ==
The fire was likely caused when miner Emanuel Kříž decided to change the wick in his lamp, but mistakenly dropped the remnants of it which sank into a cellar beneath him. After checking with three other miners for fifteen minutes and observing no fire, they left for the surface. The first signs of fire were observed two hours later. However, at Kříž's trial, experts from the Mining Academy argued the cause could not be definitively concluded.

== Aftermath ==
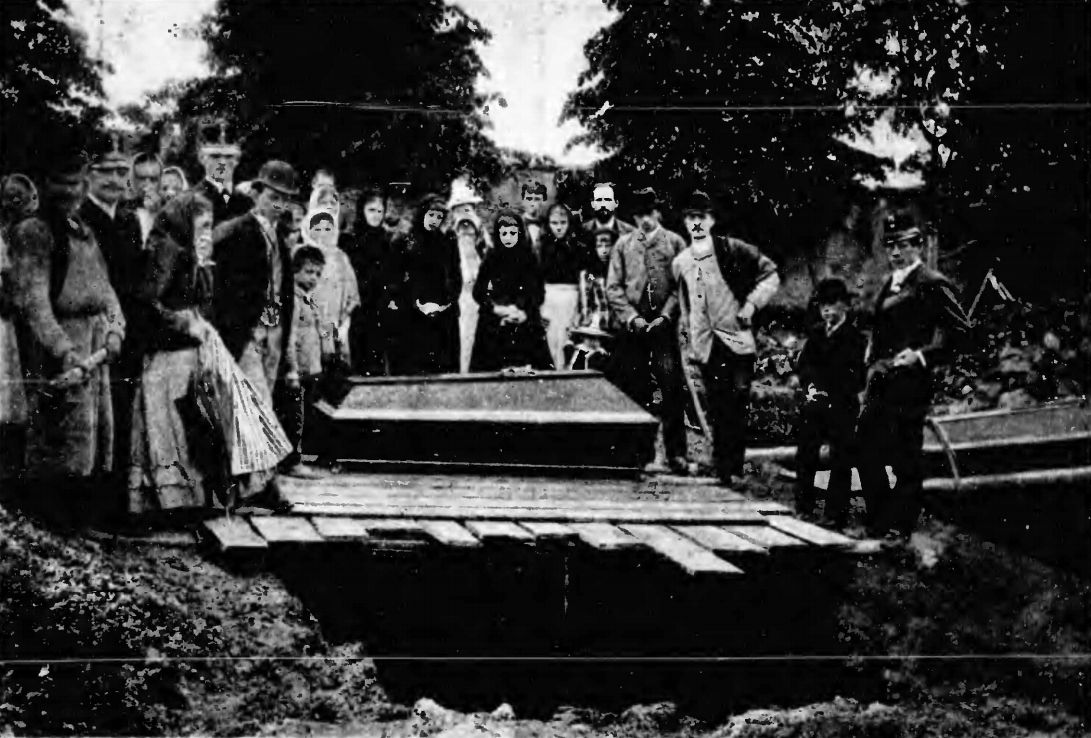
Funeral for victims, June 1892

As a result of the tragedy, 285 women were widowed and 919 children were orphaned.

Kříž and the three miners with him were jailed for terms of months to three years, though Kříž was released early after receiving a pardon from the Emperor.
