= US Socozaki =

- Full name: Union Sportive Socozaki
- Ground: Stade Matokeo; Butembo, DR Congo
- Capacity: 15,000
- League: Linafoot

Union Sportive Socozaki is a Congolese football club based in Butembo, North Kivu province. They were involved in a riot that broke out during a match against rival team Nyuki System in 2008 that led to the deaths of 13 people, mostly children.
