= Canal of Zubaidah =

Covered aqueduct outside of Mecca, Saudi Arabia

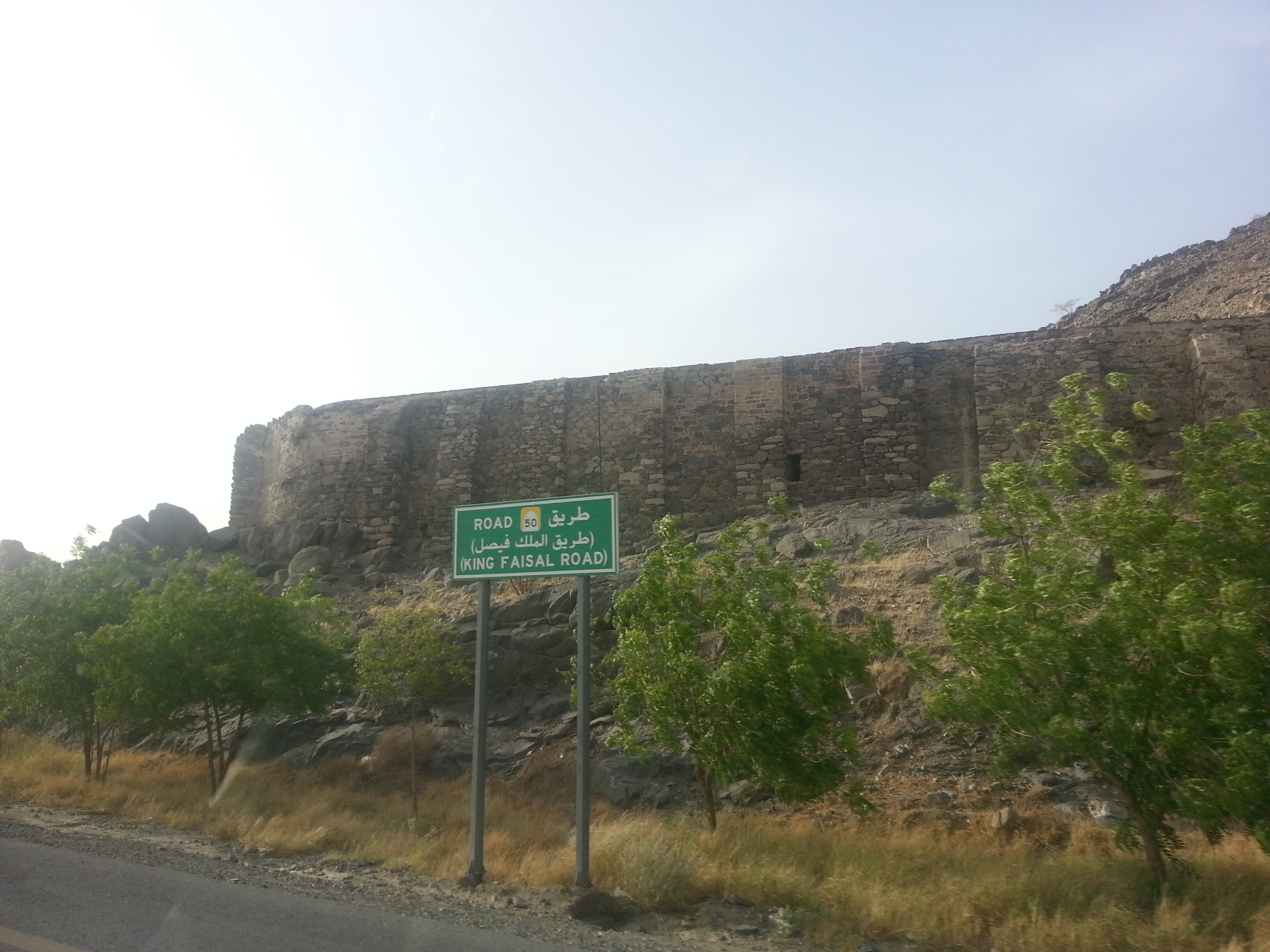
An elevated portion of the canal

The Canal of Zubaidah (Arabic: عين زبيدة, romanized: 'Ain Zubaida), also anglicized as the Canal of Zubaydah, is a system of covered aqueducts (qanat) outside of Mecca, Saudi Arabia, that historically provided water to hajj pilgrims. Built under the direction of Abbasid queen Zubaidah bint Ja'far, the canal was completed in the early 9th century and allowed water to be transported from two wadis—Wadi Hunayn and, later, Wadi Numan—to Mount Arafat, Muzdalifah, and Mina. Although requiring regular repairs, the system continued to function for over a thousand years, carrying up to 40,000 cubic metres (1,400,000 cu ft) of water per day. In 1974, amid high levels of water pumping and urban expansion, the system was rendered defunct. In the 21st century, efforts have been undertaken to preserve and revitalize the canal.

== Description ==
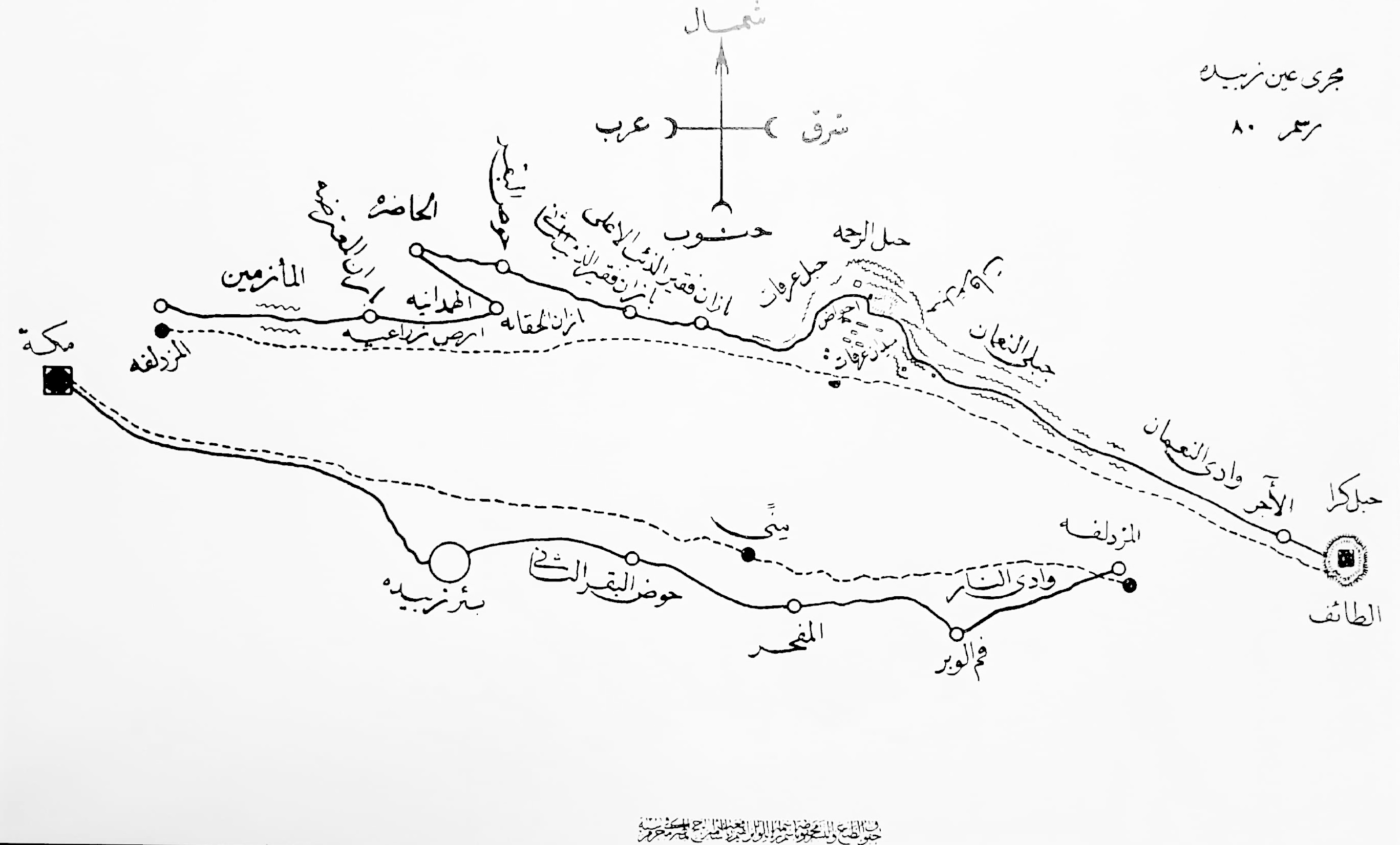
A map of the Canal of Arafat by Ibrahim Rif'at (1908). The Canal (and the Hajj route) is drawn as two halves: top half for Taif to Muzdalifah, bottom half for Muzdalifah to Mecca.

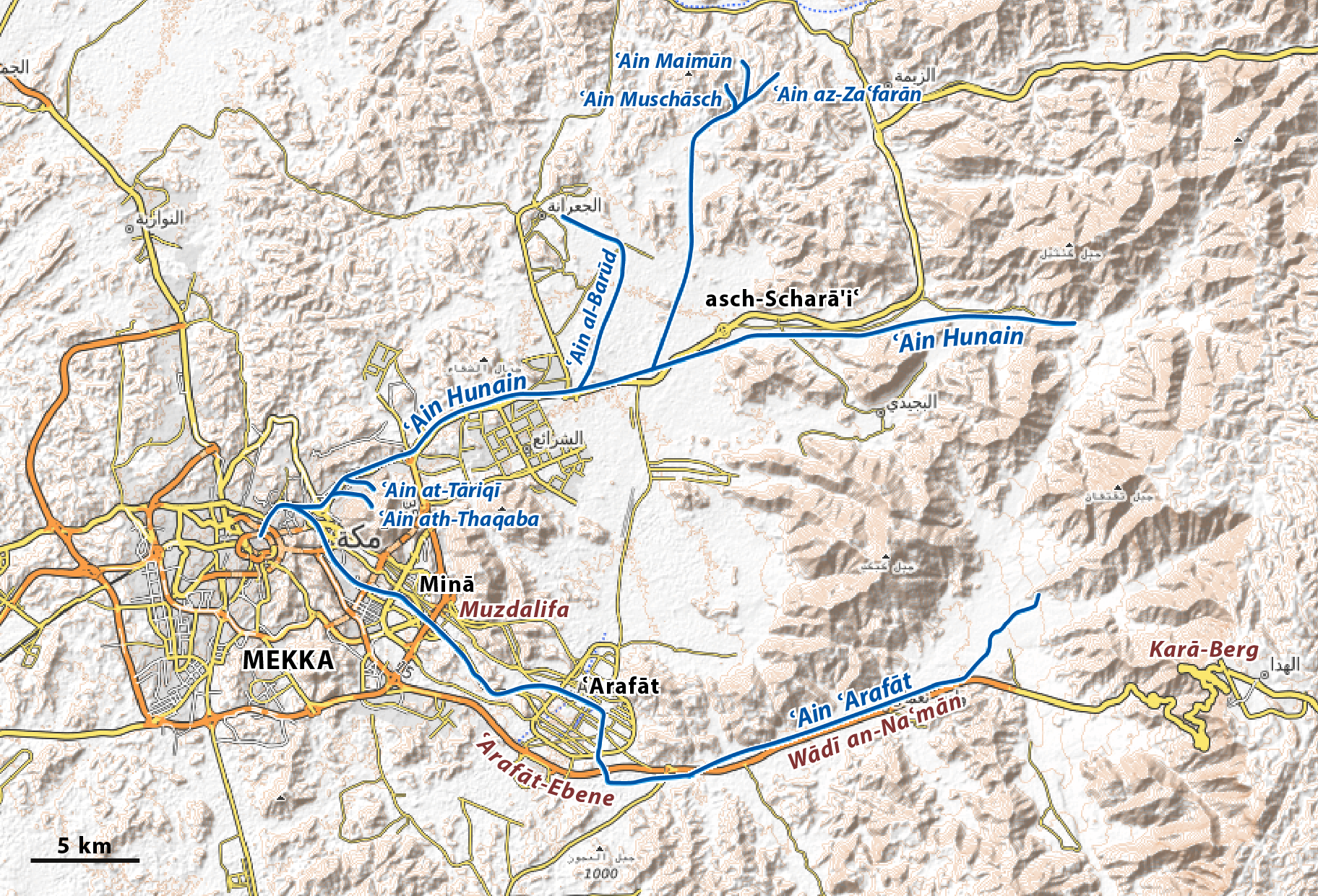
Modern map of the 19th century aqueducts of Mecca, showing both the Hunayn and the Arafat routes.

The Canal of Zubaidah is located east of Mecca, a city in Saudi Arabia. Historically, it consisted of two covered aqueducts, or qanat, that drew water from the Wadi Hunayn and, later, the Wadi Numan; the aqueducts are known respectively as the Canal of Hunayn and the Canal of Arafat. These works were carved into the local alluvium and weathered bedrock, with open portions constructed of stone where necessitated by the topography. Lime mortar was used to reinforce the structure. Stone-lined access holes for maintenance were installed at 50-metre (160 ft) intervals; access to water was provided through 130 wells, which varied in size and shape. A small slope—approximately 1 in 3000—allowed water to flow under its own gravity.

Cisterns for the earliest canal were concentrated near Mecca. The later canal followed a meandering path between hills. It originated at Wadi Numan, where four or five wells up to 35 metres (115 ft) deep were dug. From there it went to Mount Arafat, where storage tanks and access holes for drinking were installed; the majority of access was provided at this point. The canal then followed an underground path northward around Wadi Urahna to Muzdalifah, emerging near the Al-Mash'ar al-Haram Mosque. Water could be accessed there and transported further to Mina. Combined, both systems measured some 35 kilometres (22 mi) in length.

== History ==
=== Construction ===
The Canal of Zubaidah was built under the command of Queen Zubaidah bint Ja'far (died 831 CE), the wife of Caliph Harun al-Rashid of the Abbasid Caliphate. During her hajj pilgrimage, Zubaidah realized the need for potable water during the journey. She thus funded the construction of a covered canal to provide water to pilgrims travelling between Mount Arafat, Mina, and Muzdalifah. The construction of the aqueduct was one of several projects funded by Zubaidah to facilitate the hajj pilgrimage, another being the refurbishing of the Zubaydah Trail. This trail, which connects Baghdad in modern-day Iraq with Mecca, is often mistakenly conflated with the canal.

Construction began at the end of the 8th century, and concluded in the early 9th century; sources vary as to the year of completion, with some citing 801 CE and others citing 809–810 CE. Two sites were chosen, both of which benefitted from a shallow water table. Initially, the canal drew water from Wadi Hunayn; for this, storage tanks were built in Mecca, while existing date palm farms were cleared to allow construction. A pool was constructed at Mount Arafat to allow the ready collection of water.

As water levels dropped, and as flooding filled the Canal of Hunayn with silt and sand, a connection to Wadi Numan was built. This leg followed a 27-kilometre (17 mi) route connecting with Arafat and the al-Azizyah quarter of Mecca. Numerous water stations were installed to support pilgrims, including surface channels and reservoirs. The entire project was reported to have cost 1.7 million mithqal (7,225 kilograms [15,928 lb]) of gold.

=== Subsequent history ===
Pilgrims collecting water, 1928

The canal required frequent upkeep, with the first repairs conducted under Caliph al-Mutawakkil (r. 847–861) and later maintenance conducted every thirty years. Many early repairs were completed by the rulers of nearby Muslim nations, including Emir Hasan ibn Ajlan of Mecca and Sultans Qaitbay and Al-Ashraf Qansuh al-Ghuri of the Mamluk Sultanate.

Regular maintenance was also conducted by the Ottoman Empire, which conducted multiple surveys of the system. Under the Ottomans, slave labour was used for much of maintenance. In the mid-16th century, major repairs were ordered by Mihrimah Sultan and involved a workforce of almost a thousand people. Sultan Mustafa III initiated a three-year restoration in 1757, overseen by Feyzullah Efendi, with a budget of 86,000 kuruş. In 1819, Sultan Mahmud II ordered another restoration, granting significant powers to Muhammad Ali of Egypt.

By the 1870s, the system was again in a state of disrepair. A number of Indian Muslims thus coordinated fundraising efforts throughout the Islamic world, with work continuing from 1876 through 1883. Another major restoration project was undertaken by Ibn Saud in 1928 after flooding damaged the canal, blocking it with silt and other materials. Although it was restored to functionality, with its capacity recorded at 40,000 cubic metres (1,400,000 cu ft) per day, by the middle of the century continued pumping and urban development had disrupted canal's ability to recharge.

After providing water to hajj pilgrims for more than a thousand years, the canal was rendered defunct in 1974, though advances in aquifer extraction had allowed Mecca's water needs to be met. Elements of the canal remain visible to pilgrims as of 2017, with the remaining infrastructure measured at approximately 18 kilometres (11 mi). The surviving elements have been protected by the Saudi government, and in 2004 research was conducted into the viability of revitalizing the network. In the 2010s, plans were developed to restore parts of the canal and build a museum to introduce visitors to the canal and its history.

== Works cited ==
- Al-Bassam, Abdulaziz M.; Zaidi, Faisal K. (2016). "Aqueducts in Saudi Arabia". In Angelakis, Andreas N.; Chiotis, Eustathios; Eslamian, Saeid; Weingartner, Herbert (eds.). Underground Aqueducts Handbook. pp. 211–228. doi:10.1201/9781315368566. ISBN 978-1-4987-4831-5.
- Bilge, Mustafa L. (1991). "Aynizübeyde" [Canal of Zubaidah]. İslâm Ansiklopedisi (in Turkish). pp. 279–280. Archived from the original on 18 February 2026.
- "Canal of Zubaida". Madain Project. Archived from the original on 18 February 2026.
- Hussain, Intizar; Abu-Rizaiza, Omar Siraj; Habib, Mohammad A.A.; Ashfaq, Muhammad (2008). "Revitalizing a Traditional Dryland Water Supply System: The Karezes in Afghanistan, Iran, Pakistan and the Kingdom of Saudi Arabia". Water International. 33 (3): 333–349. doi:10.1080/02508060802255890. Full access available to users of The Wikipedia Library.
- Khurshid, Khalid (30 June 2012). "Ayn Zubaydah Flows Down Memory Lane". Arab News. Archived from the original on 19 February 2026.
- Siraj, M. A.; Tayab, M. A. K. (2017). "Water in Islam". In Raju, K. V.; Manasi, S. (eds.). Water and Scriptures: Ancient Roots for Sustainable Development. Springer. doi:10.1007/978-3-319-50562-6_2. ISBN 978-3-319-50562-6. Full access available to users of The Wikipedia Library.
