= Zubaydah Trail =

Islamic pilgrimage and trade route

Darb Zubaydah
- درب زبيدة
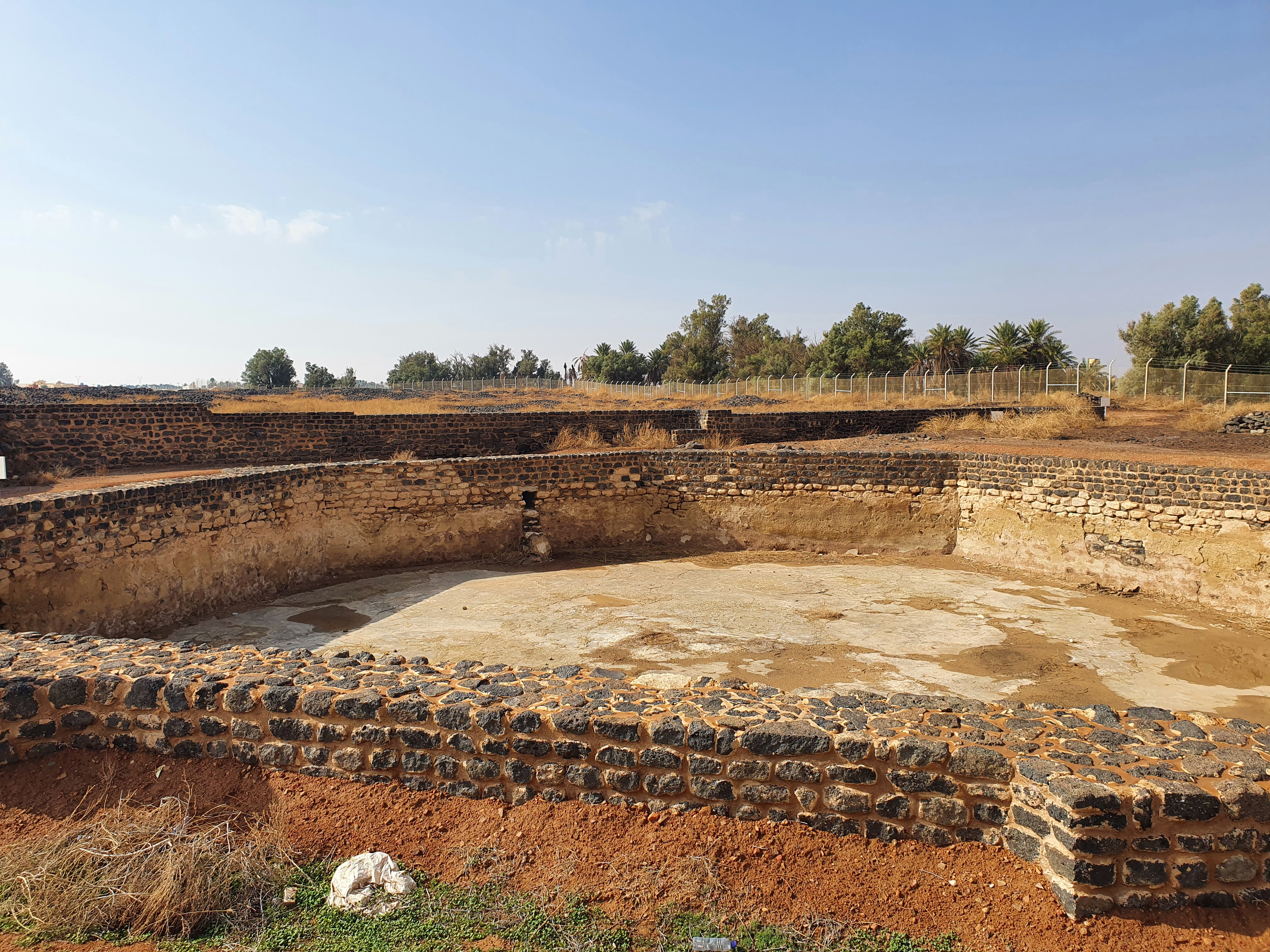
- Main water cistern at the early Islamic site of Fayd, along the Al-Kufi pilgrimage route
- Location: Iraq, Saudi Arabia
- Region: Mecca Province

The Zubaydah Trail, also known as the Al-Kufi pilgrimage route after Kufa, its starting point, is one among the seven major hajj pilgrimage routes in the Arabian Peninsula, dating back over 1000 years. A crucial trade route during the Abbasid era, it is a tentative candidate for the UNESCO World Heritage List. This historical trail was constructed to serve pilgrims from Iraq, neighbouring Islamic countries, and East Asian countries.

Its construction was completed during the Abbasid Caliphate, specifically between 132 AH (750 CE) and 656 AH (1258 CE).

The trail's history dates back to the pre-Islamic era, when it was used by tribes, travellers, and commercial caravans to move between Iraq and Western Arabia. Over time, its usage became regular and easier as the water centres, grazing areas, and mining locations along the route transformed into major stations.

During the Abbasid period, the trail served as an important link between Baghdad, the holy cities of Mecca and Medina, and the rest of the Arabian Peninsula. The Abbasid caliphs took great interest in the trail, enhanced it with various benefits and facilities, as well as undertook an expansion of the road to make it suitable for use by pilgrims, travellers, and their animals.

Historical, geographical, and archaeological sources show that the trail route was designed in a practical and meticulous manner. Along its length from Kufa to Mecca, stations, houses, and resting areas were established. Its surface was paved with stones in sandy and muddy areas. In addition, it was equipped with necessary amenities and facilities such as wells, ponds, and dams. Signages, lighthouses, beacons, and stoves were also set up to mark its path and guide travellers.

The Zubaydah Trail stretches over a distance of 1,300 kilometres and is connected to 27 main stations, most of which are concentrated in Saudi Arabia. Furthermore, 58 subsidiary stations called muta'asha, which are rest stops, were established between every two main stations. The average distance between each main station and the next is approximately 50 kilometres.

== Naming ==
The trail was named after Queen Zubaydah, the granddaughter of Caliph Abu Ja'far al-Mansur and wife of Caliph Harun al-Rashid, who played a significant role in its development. She made significant contributions towards the construction of the trail, and alongside her husband, dedicated a considerable amount of their wealth towards the comfort of pilgrims and travellers. The idea for establishing the trail came after she experienced great hardships on her journey to perform the Hajj pilgrimage in the year 176 AH. She then ordered the construction of rest areas and ponds along the routes of valleys in a well-organized manner that helped collect rainwater, streams, and runoff within water canals.

Although the two are sometimes conflated, the trail is distinct from the Canal of Zubaidah, a covered aqueduct (qanat) sponsored by Queen Zubaydah to bring water to pilgrims during the hajj.

== Saudi stations and other sites ==
Of the 1,300 km-long route between Kufa and Mecca, 1/5th is located in present-day Iraq, the remaining 4/5th being located in Saudi Arabia. Of the 13 sites presented to UNESCO as part of a future World Heritage site, four are in Iraq and nine in Saudi Arabia, the latter being:

- Al-Thulaimiya Pool / Al-Haytham (coordinates: 29°37′29″N 43°36′46″E). Well-preserved circular basin of 32 m diameter with a large staircase.
- Al-Jumaimiyah (coordinates: 29°36′20″N 43°36′13″E). Pilgrim station with a 30 x 30 m rainfed basin, a dry-dug well, and old foundations. One km to the south are the remains of a rectangular building - maybe a fortress or caravanserai.
- Al-Zabalah (coordinates: 29°23′55″N 43°33′43″E). One of the largest stations on the hajj road (2x1 km), with 3 water tanks and hundreds of very deep wells dug in the wadi, some still in use. A ruined square fortress (ca. 35 x 35 m) with round towers in each corner and one in the middle of each wall, surrounded by a large walled court and dominating the wadi from the south. On its northern side are the ruins of houses.
- Paved stretch between Buraykat al-‘Ashshar and Birkat al-‘Ara’ish (coordinates: 28°28′53″N 43°19′49″E). The soft sand of the Nafud Desert had to be paved, and on this ca. 40 km long stretch stone pavements of 2-4 m width were discovered.
- Fayd (coordinates: 27°07′13″N 42°31′20″E). The oasis of Fayd stood halfway between Kufa and Mecca, close to the junction of the roads leading to Madinah and to Mecca. This most strategic location on the trail was the Abbasid-period main seat for the administrators of the road during hajj season. A storage point for the return journey, it was protected by a fortress. There is evidence for Fayd's importance prior to the Abbasid period and even in the pre-Islamic era. Not much remains of the fort. The remains of the ancient town include many wells and house remains, and two large quadrangular reservoirs. The town stood 2 km NW of the hajj road, which at this point was 18 m wide.
- Al-Neqrah – Al-Jafniyah Pool (coordinates: 25°32′41″N 41°35′14″E). The village of Ma’dan An-Neqrah is closely related to the local ancient copper mines, and to the hajj road. A road toward Madinah via As-Asilah meets here another leading toward Mecca via the Al-Mughithahkkah station. The An-Neqrah station boasted a palace and a mosque built by Khalisa, Zubaydah'd maid, two pools, and eight road markers (2 each at the entrance, exit, toward the road to Basra, and the road to Madinah). The site contains mining vestiges south of the village, as well as hajj-related remains (road markers, palace and water facilities such as the Aljfnyh Pool).
- Al-Rabadhah (coordinates: 24°37′51″N 41°17′23″E). Rashidun caliph Umar Ibn al-Khattab used Rabadhah as a state grazing reserve for animals collected as tax. The prosperous Abbasid pilgrim station had a fortress, two mosques and two reservoirs, but was abandoned after being attacked in 931 CE during the invasion of the Qarmatians.
- Al-Kharabah (coordinates: 22°11′41″N 40°50′03″E). Situated in a depression, it was used to collect runoff water by numerous tunnels leading to a rectangular catchment and settling reservoir (36 x 28 m and 5.8 m deep), from which the water passed through sluices into an enormous circular reservoir (ca. 54 m diameter and 4.8 m deep), both almost perfectly preserved.
- Harrat Rahat, cleared route stretch between Sufayna and Birket Hadha (coordinates: 22°10′27″N 40°47′10″E). The Abbasid engineers cleared the largest stones to the side of the ca. 18 m wide road, which passes through a vast, rough and rocky lava plain, thus forming low lateral walls. Further south, where some volcanic boulders were too large to move, the road winds around them, with smaller rocks cleared away and built into curb-walls. The road passes Birkat Al-Shihiyya, Birkat Al-Hamra and Birkat Hamad in the first section, and Sufayna and Birkat Hadha in the harsher 16 km long section.
