= Al-Mash'ar al-Haram Mosque =

Mosque in Muzdalifah, Saudi Arabia

Coordinates: 21°23′10″N 39°54′44″E

The Sacred Grove
- Al-Mašʿar Al-Ḥarām (ٱلْمَشْعَر ٱلْحَرَام)
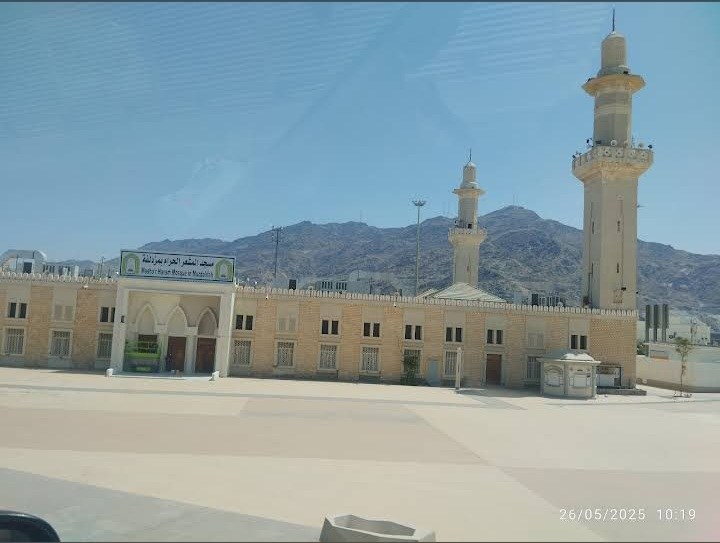

- Location within Saudi Arabia Al-Mash'ar al-Haram Mosque (Middle East) Al-Mash'ar al-Haram Mosque (West and Central Asia)

Religion
- Affiliation: Islam
- Ecclesiastical or organisational status: Mosque
- Status: Active

Location
- Location: Muzdalifah, Makkah, Hejaz

Architecture
- Type: Mosque architecture
- Style: Islamic

Specifications
- Direction of façade: Qiblah
- Minaret: 2

Al-Mash'ar al-Haram Mosque (Arabic: مَسْجِد ٱلْمَشْعَر ٱلْحَرَام, romanized: Masjid Al-Mašʿar Al-Ḥarām), a historic mosque, is one of the most significant landmarks of the Hajj pilgrimage, located in Muzdalifah, western Saudi Arabia.

== Background ==
The history of the mosque is closely connected to the Islamic Prophet Muhammad's actions during the Farewell Pilgrimage, and to the Quranic command to remember God here when moving from Arafat to Muzdalifah. The mosque was originally built in the 3rd century A.H. (as noted by al-Azraqi) on the site where Muhammad spent the night in Muzdalifah, prayed Fajr, and remembered God until daybreak.

The importance of the area stems from its mention in the Quran (2:198) as the Sacred Grove:

لَيْسَ عَلَيْكُمْ جُنَاحٌ أَن تَبْتَغُوا فَضْلًا مِّن رَّبِّكُمْ ۚ فَإِذَا أَفَضْتُم مِّنْ عَرَفَاتٍ فَاذْكُرُوا اللهَ عِندَ الْمَشْعَرِ الْحَرَامِ ۖ وَاذْكُرُوهُ كَمَا هَدَاكُمْ وَإِن كُنتُم مِّن قَبْلِهِ لَمِنَ الضَّالِّينَ
There is no sin on you if you seek the Bounty of your Lord. Then when you leave 'Arafat, remember Allah at the Sacred Grove. And remember Him as He has guided you, and verily, you were, before, of those who were astray.

—

The Sacred Grove in the verse refers to the Muzdalifah area and not specifically where the modern mosque is located.

According to Islamic tradition, it is the place where the Prophet prayed and spent the night in Muzdalifah. The mosque serves as a place for remembering God, performing the combined Maghrib and ‘Isha prayers, and spending the night in Muzdalifah before heading to Mina on the morning of Eid. Each year, millions of pilgrims visit the mosque as a blessed site of prayer and devotion.

Since its initial construction, the mosque has undergone several expansions and restorations throughout Islamic history, eventually reaching its present form.

== Description ==
The mosque is situated in the heart of Muzdalifah, between Mount Arafat and Mina, along the route connecting the two sites. It serves as a major gathering point for pilgrims after they move from Arafat at the end of the Day of Arafah.

The mosque covers an area of approximately 5,040 m^{2} (54,300 sq ft), with a length of about 90 m (300 ft) and a width of 56 metres (184 feet). It includes a large prayer courtyard that can accommodate over 12,000 worshippers, and it features two minarets rising to a height of around 32 metres (105 feet).

The exterior of the mosque is a low-rise, rectilinear structure with a strong horizontal emphasis, articulated by repetitive modular façades of light-colored masonry, evenly spaced rectangular windows with metal grilles, and a crenellated parapet. Its most prominent vertical elements are two 32-metre minarets at the eastern side, composed of cylindrical shafts, single balconies, and modest capped tops, designed in a restrained modern Arab-Islamic style that maintains material and visual coherence with the main structure.

The interior is a single, open hypostyle prayer hall constructed with reinforced concrete, organized through a dense, modular grid of columns forming longitudinal aisles aligned toward the qibla. Spatial emphasis is functional and restrained, with a subtly articulated miḥrāb on the qibla wall and a continuous red carpet patterned with miḥrāb motifs to guide orderly prayer rows.

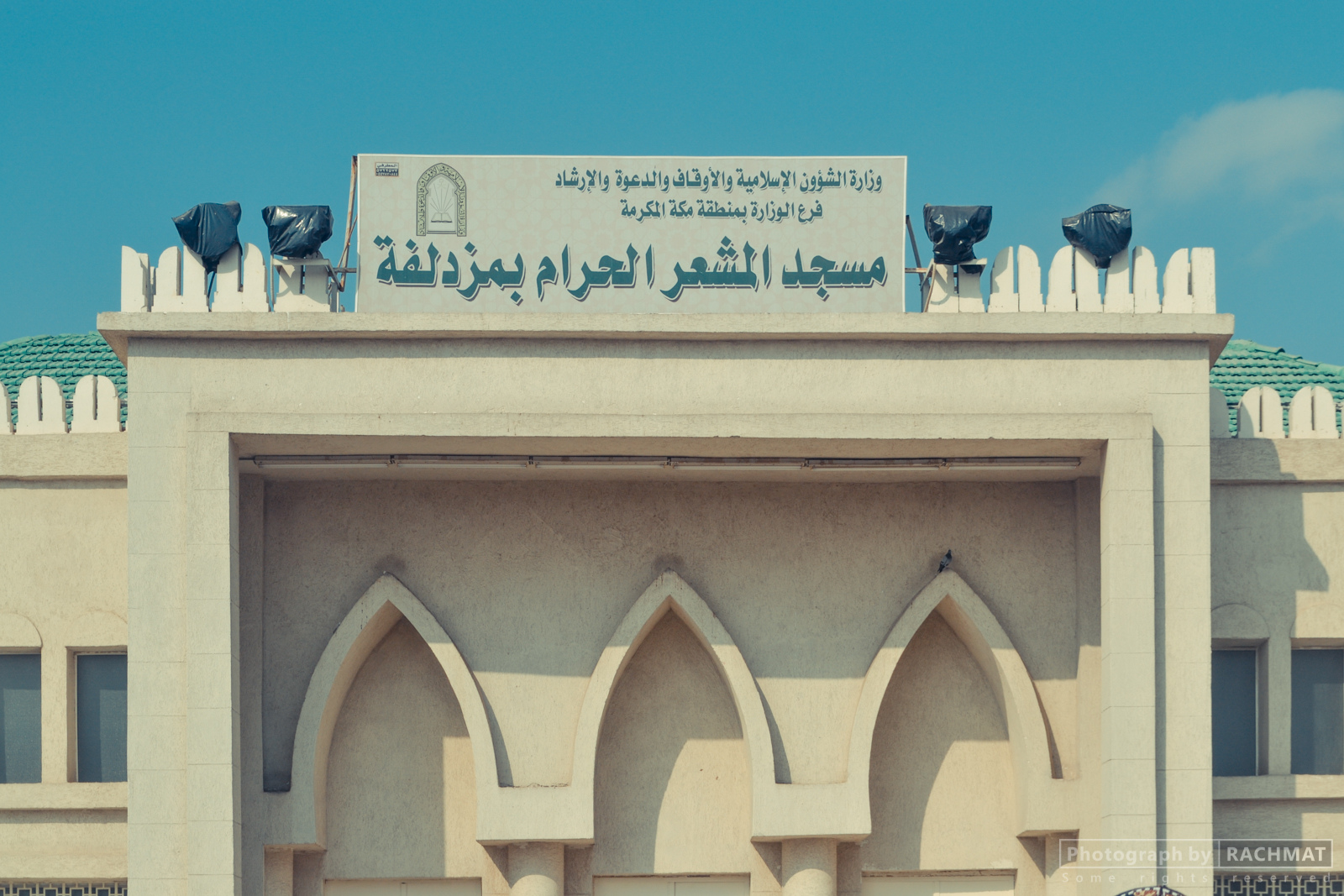
The mosque in 2015

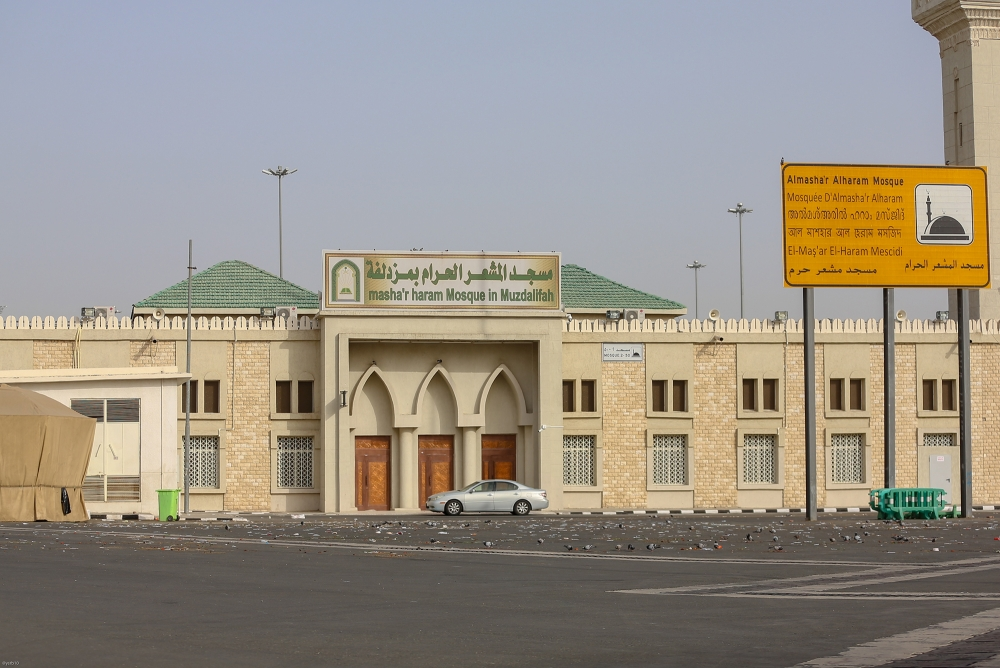
The mosque in 2018

== See also ==
- Holiest sites in Islam
- Islam in Saudi Arabia
- List of mosques that are mentioned by name in the Quran
- Sarat Mountains
  - Hejaz Mountains
