= Mecca fire of 1997 =

Fire incident in Mecca, Saudi Arabia (1997)

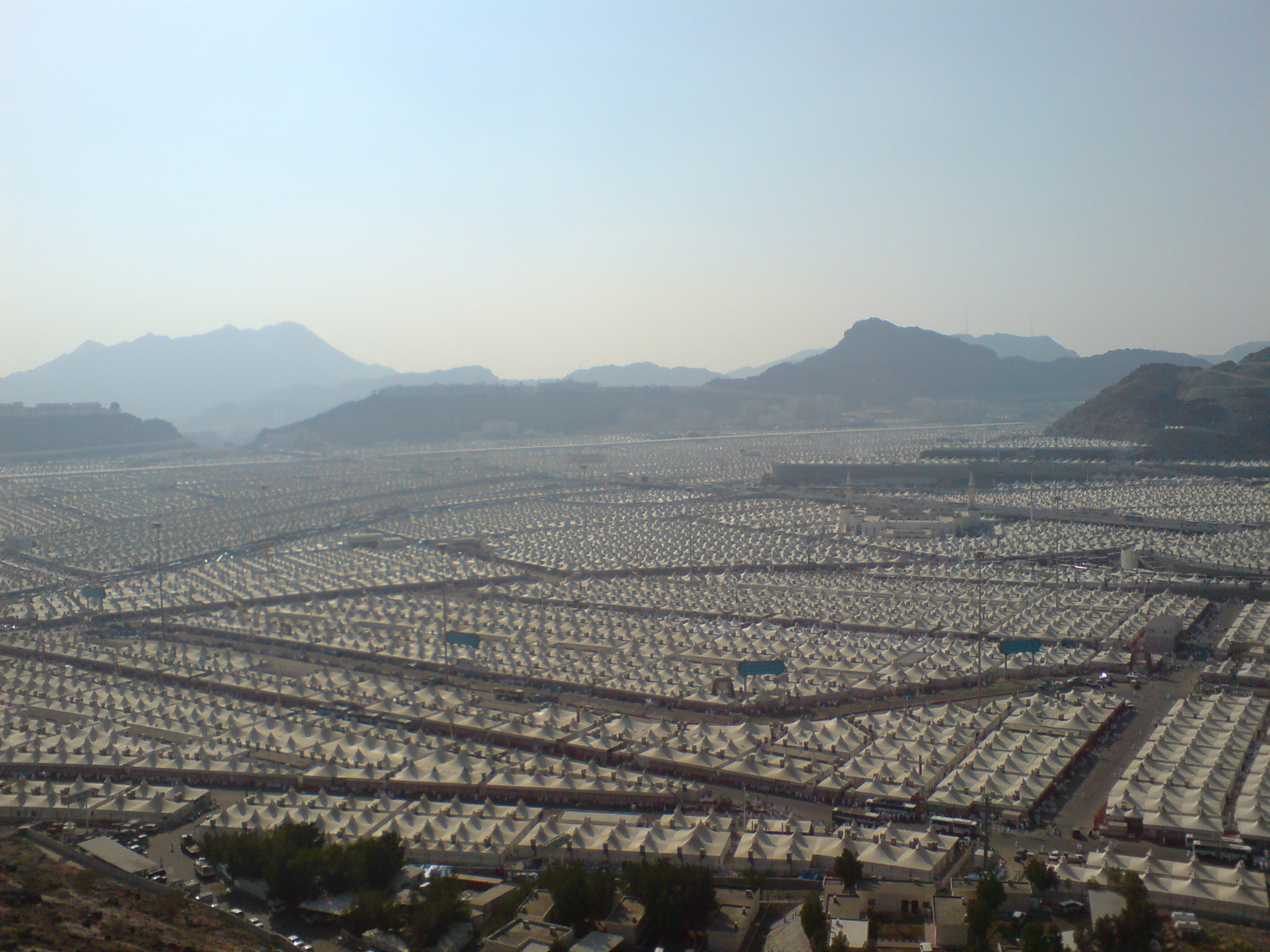
- Tented areas covering the Plain of Mina, Saudi Arabia
- Date: 15 April 1997; (11:45 AM AST)
- Location: Mecca, Saudi Arabia

Impacts
- Deaths: between 217 and 343
- Injuries: 1,300
- Structures destroyed: 70,000 tents

Ignition
- Cause: Gas explosion

The Mecca fire of 1997 was a fire that occurred in the tent city Mina near Mecca in Saudi Arabia on April 15th 1997, killing between 217 and 300 pilgrims and injuring 1,300. According to witnesses, most of the dead were pilgrim from India, Pakistan and Bangladesh.

== Details ==
The fire erupted in the overcrowded tent city, Mina, where an estimated two million Muslim pilgrims were gathered on the first day of the Hajj, the ritualistic pilgrimage to Mecca. The fire erupted at 11:45 a.m. (AST), and was caused by exploding canisters of cooking gas, according to witnesses. The fire was fanned by winds of nearly 40 miles per hour (64 km/h) causing the destruction of an estimated 70,000 tents. Officially, 1,290 were injured and 217 killed, though witnesses and local newspapers claimed at least 300 were killed, many trampled in the panic. Later official reports gave a death toll of 343; no official list of fatalities has been published. Opposition sources claimed over 2,000 deaths had occurred, many from trampling. The fire was fought by three hundred fire engines as well as helicopters, and controlled in three hours.

== Aftermath ==
Less than an hour before the fire began, Saudi security forces had thrown up a cordon around the entire plain, closing it to new arrivals in an effort to prevent further crowding, witnesses said. The Saudis used helicopters to battle the fire, along with some 300 fire engines. Television news reports showed trucks shooting powerful jets of water into the camp as black smoke filled the air. Fanned by winds of nearly 40 mile per hour, the fire swept quickly across the plain, spreading chaos through the camp, crammed with row after row of white tents. Muslim pilgrims, dressed in white robes worn to show unity and modesty, could be seen in the television reports racing through the burning camp, some carrying stretchers. Prince Majid bin Abdul Aziz, the Saudi royal family's representative in Mecca, ordered that new tents be provided to all pilgrims affected by the fire, Saudi television reported.

== See also ==
- Incidents during the Hajj
