= Al Khayf =

Al-Khayf ٱلْخَيْف
- Village
- Location in Saudi Arabia Al-Khayf (Middle East) Al-Khayf (West and Central Asia)
- Coordinates: 21°41′N 39°44′E
- Country: Saudi Arabia
- Province: Makkah Province
- Time zone: UTC+3 (EAT)
  - Summer (DST): UTC+3 (EAT)

Al-Khayf (Arabic: ٱلْخَيْف) is a village in Makkah Province, in western Saudi Arabia.

== See also ==
- Al-Khayf Mosque in Mina
- List of cities and towns in Saudi Arabia
- Regions of Saudi Arabia
