= Mina, Saudi Arabia =

Mina Minā (مِنَى)
- Neighbourhood
- Mina
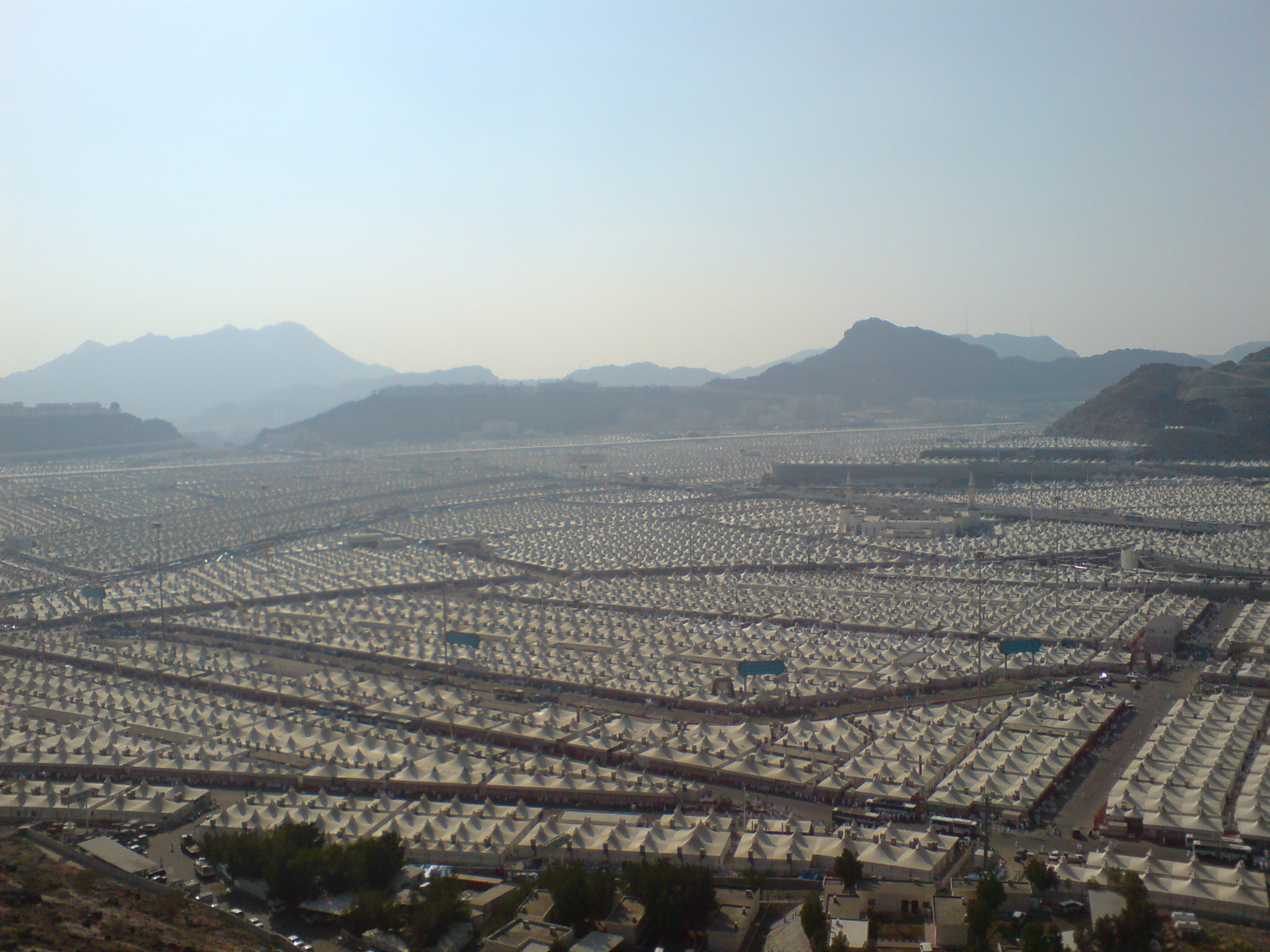
- Tents at Mina
- Nickname: City of Tents
- Location in Saudi Arabia Mina (Middle East) Mina (West and Central Asia)
- Country: Saudi Arabia
- Province: Mecca Province, Al-Hejaz
- City: Mecca

Area
  - Total: 20 km^{2} (7.7 sq mi)
- Time zone: UTC+3 (AST)

Mina (Arabic: مِنَى, romanized: Minā), nicknamed the "City of the Tents", is a valley located 8 kilometres (5 miles) southeast of the city of Mecca, in the district of Masha'er, Province of Makkah in the Hejazi region of Saudi Arabia. Covering an area of approximately 20 km^{2} (7.7 sq mi), Mina incorporates the tents, the area of Jamarat, and the slaughterhouses just outside the tents.

Mina is most famous for its role in the Hajj ("Pilgrimage"). To accommodate the pilgrims who stay in Mina over multiple nights in the month of Dhu al-Hijjah, more than 100,000 air-conditioned tents have been built in the area, giving Mina the nickname "City of Tents." With a capacity of up to 3 million people, Mina has been called the largest tent city in the world. The three Jamarat, located in the Mina valley, are the location of the Jamarat, performed between sunrise and sunset in the final days of the Hajj. The stone throwing ritual commemorates the Islamic prophet Ibrahim (Abraham)'s stoning of the Devil, who wanted to prevent him from carrying out the command of Allah to sacrifice his son, Isma'il (Ishmael).

== History ==
In Islamic tradition, Ibrahim left his wife, Hajar (Hagar) and their infant son, Isma'il, in the valley of Mecca. Upon one of his visits to his family in Mecca, he was ordered by God in a dream to sacrifice his son in the Mina valley. While carrying out his son's sacrifice, he was interrupted by the Shaitan (Devil), and commanded by Allah to stone the Devil. The ritual of Jamarat is a commemoration of this belief. Mina is also believed to be the location of the pledges in Al-Aqabah of the Ansar to the Islamic prophet Muhammad.

Before the tents were built, pilgrims would bring their own tents to the valley and dismantle them while returning from the Hajj. Sometime in the 1990s, permanent cotton tents were installed by the Saudi government. These cotton tents were especially susceptible to fires, which took many pilgrims' lives. After the 1997 Mina fires which resulted in the deaths of more than 340 pilgrims, more than 100,000 permanent tents, measuring 8 by 8 metres (26 ft × 26 ft), were built. These are constructed of fiberglass with an outer coating of Teflon to protect them from fires. The tents are grouped into camps, each with their own exterior walls, and divided by the nationalities of pilgrims, providing temporary accommodation to up to 3 million pilgrims. Each camp is equipped with a kitchen, bathrooms, and ablution facilities, and is connected to the other camps by pathways. The tents are also marked with unique color-and-number pairs to make them more identifiable.

=== Incidents during the Hajj ===
Owing to its location and the extreme numbers of pilgrims during the Hajj, Mina and the surrounding region, especially the Jamarat Bridge, are hotspots for crushes, the deadliest of which was the 2015 crush, resulting in the deaths of more than 2,000 pilgrims:

Date	Name of the incident	Location	Deaths	Non-fatal injuries	Sources
3 July 1990	1990 Mecca tunnel stampede	al-Mu'aisim Tunnel, Mecca	1,426	Unknown	
23 May 1994	1994 Hajj stampede	Jamarat Bridge	270+	200+	
15 April 1997	1997 Mina fires	Mina	340+	1,500+	
9 April 1998	1998 Hajj stampede	Jamarat Bridge	118+	180+	
5 March 2001	2001 Hajj stampede	Jamarat Bridge	35+	Unknown	
1 February 2004	2004 Hajj stampede	Jamarat Bridge	251+	244+	
12 January 2006	2006 Hajj stampede	Jamarat Bridge	363	1,000+	
24 September 2015	2015 Mina stampede	Street(s) 204/223, Mina	769+	936+	

== Geography ==
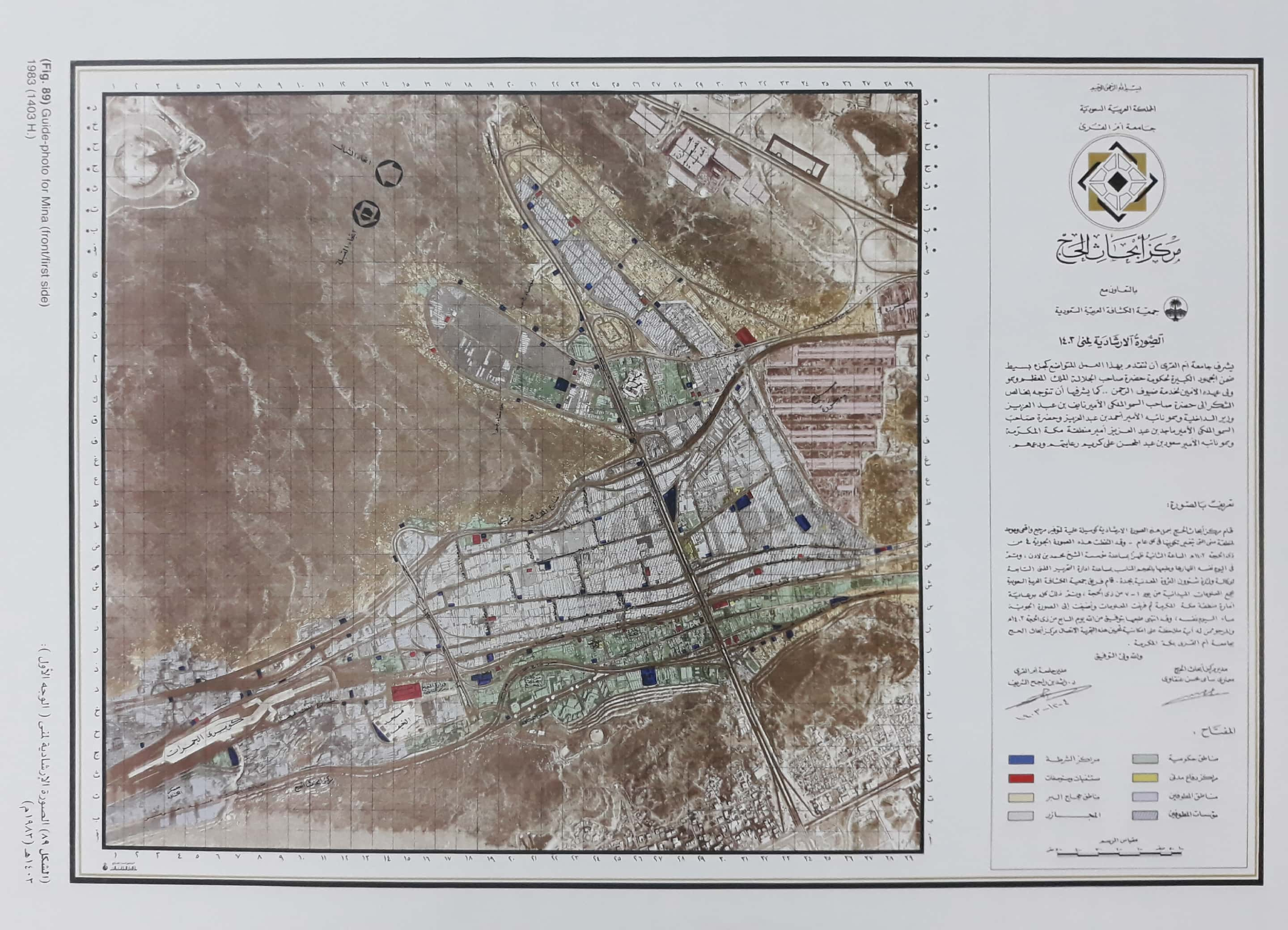
An aerial map of Mina prepared by the Umm al-Qura' University in Mecca. The white tents can be seen in this picture, cut by the multiple pathways between them.

Mina is situated in the eponymous Mina valley, at an elevation of approximately 400 m (1,300 ft). It is bordered by the al-'Aziziyah district of Mecca in the west, the 4th Ring Road to the north, Muzdalifah to the east, and the al-Jami'ah district to the south. The westernmost features of Mina are the three Jamarat, which are stoned during the Jamarat. These are, the Jamarat al-Sughra', the westernmost and smallest, the Jamarat al-Wusta', the intermediary, and the Jamarat al-Kubra', also called Jamarat al-'Aqabah, the largest and easternmost. In a 2003 study, the distance between the first two was measured to be 135 m (443 ft) and the distance between the latter two was measured at 225 metres (738 feet). To the north-east of Mina are the slaughterhouses, where the sacrificial animals of the Hajj pilgrims are slaughtered. The Masjid al-Khayf is located in the centre of the Mina valley, and is active only during the Hajj.

== Infrastructure ==
=== Mosque ===
Al-Khaif Mosque
- Masjid al-Khayf (مَسْجِد ٱلْخَيْف)
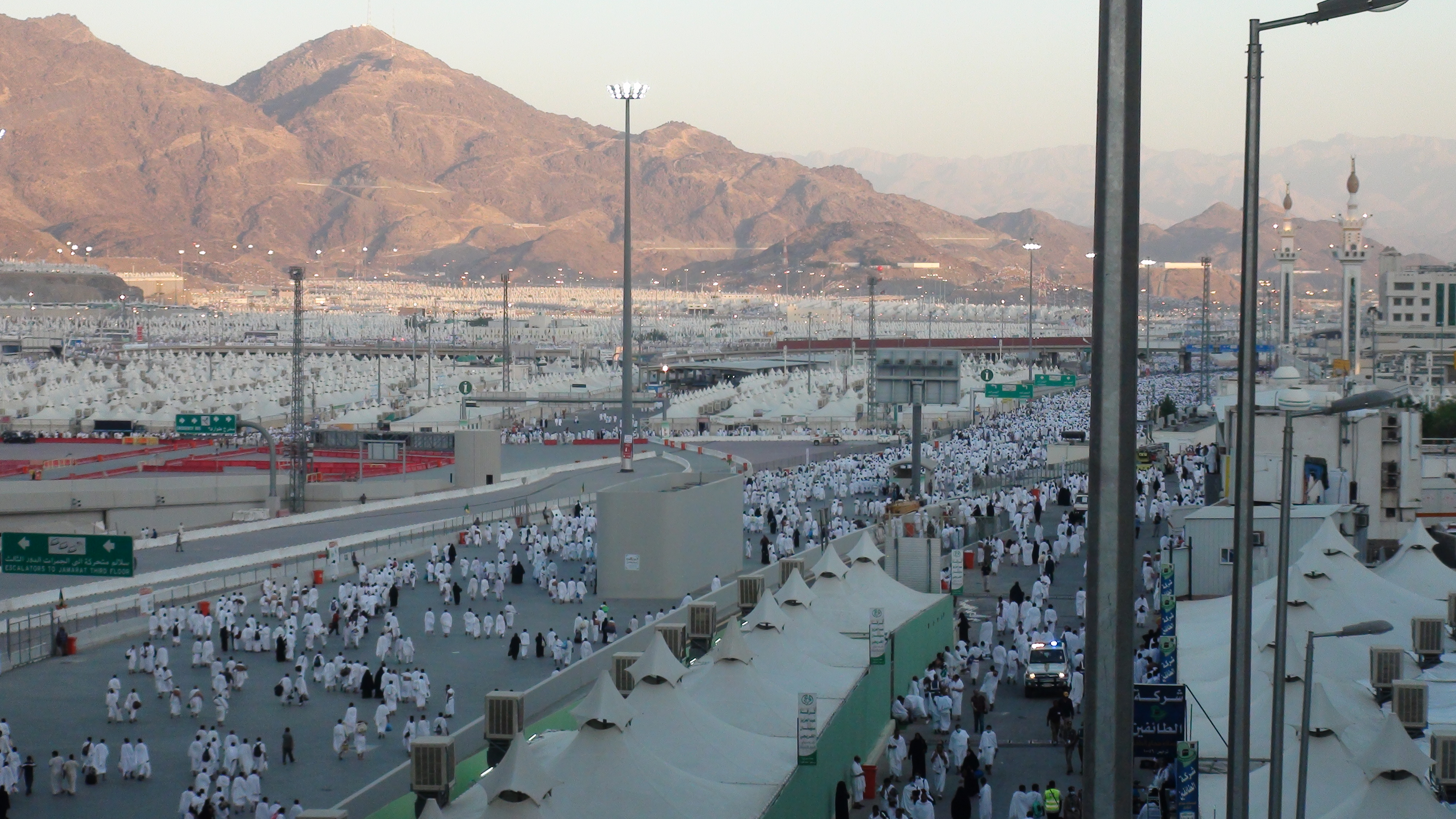
- Hajis (Pilgrims) walking through the valley of Mina, with Al-Khaif Mosque to the right

Religion
- Affiliation: Islam
- Ecclesiastical or organisational status: Mosque
- Status: Active

Location
- Location: Mina, Makkah, Hejaz
- Country: Saudi Arabia
- Interactive map of Al-Khaif Mosque
- Coordinates: 21°24′54.98″N 39°52′40.07″E

Architecture
- Type: Mosque architecture
- Style: Islamic

Specifications
- Direction of façade: Qiblah
- Minaret: 4
- Site area: 20,000 m^{2} (220,000 sq ft)

Al-Khaif Mosque (Arabic: مَسْجِد ٱلْخَيْف, romanized: Masjid al-Khayf), covering approximately 20,000 m^{2} (220,000 sq ft), is the largest mosque in Mina. It is associated with Islamic Prophet Muhammad.

=== Transport ===
Highway 40, one of Saudi Arabia's most important highways, is less than 3 km (1.9 miles) from Mina and is accessible through the Al Hajj Street. The Mashaer Al-Muqaddassah Metro, currently Saudi Arabia's only complete metro line, is active only during the Hajj, and ends in Mina, near the Jamarat al-'Aqaba, with Mina Station 3. Running northwest, it starts in 'Arafat, going through Muzdalifah, before reaching Mina Station 1, near the Armed Forces Hospital. The next station, less than 1 kilometre (0.62 miles), is the Mina Station 2, located near the Mina al-Jisr Hospital. Finally, the line terminates near the Jamarat, at Mina Station 3.

== Gallery ==
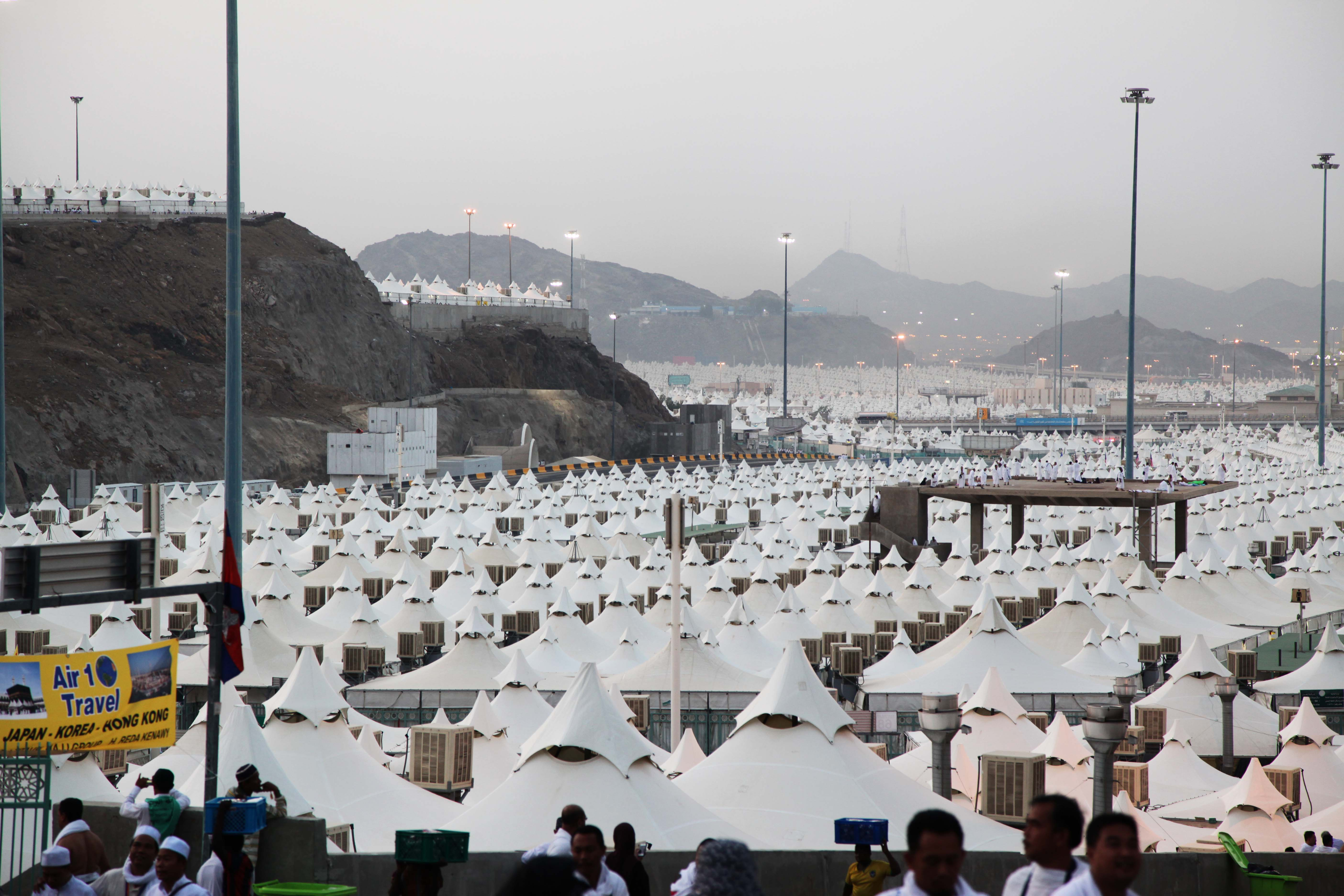
Tents

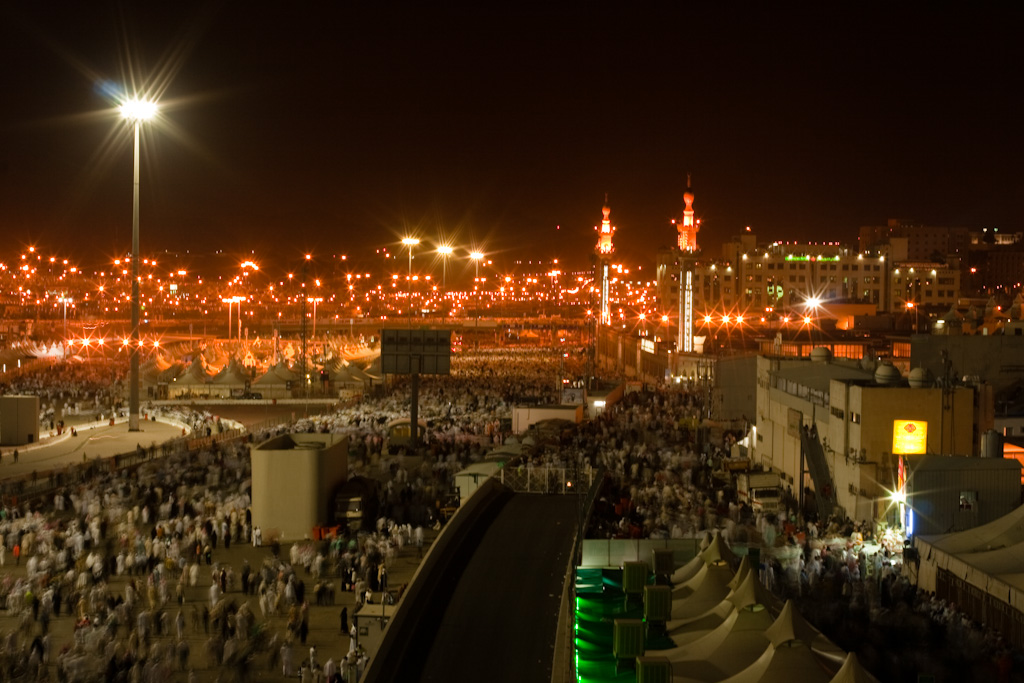
A large crowd of pilgrims heading to the Jamarat Bridge

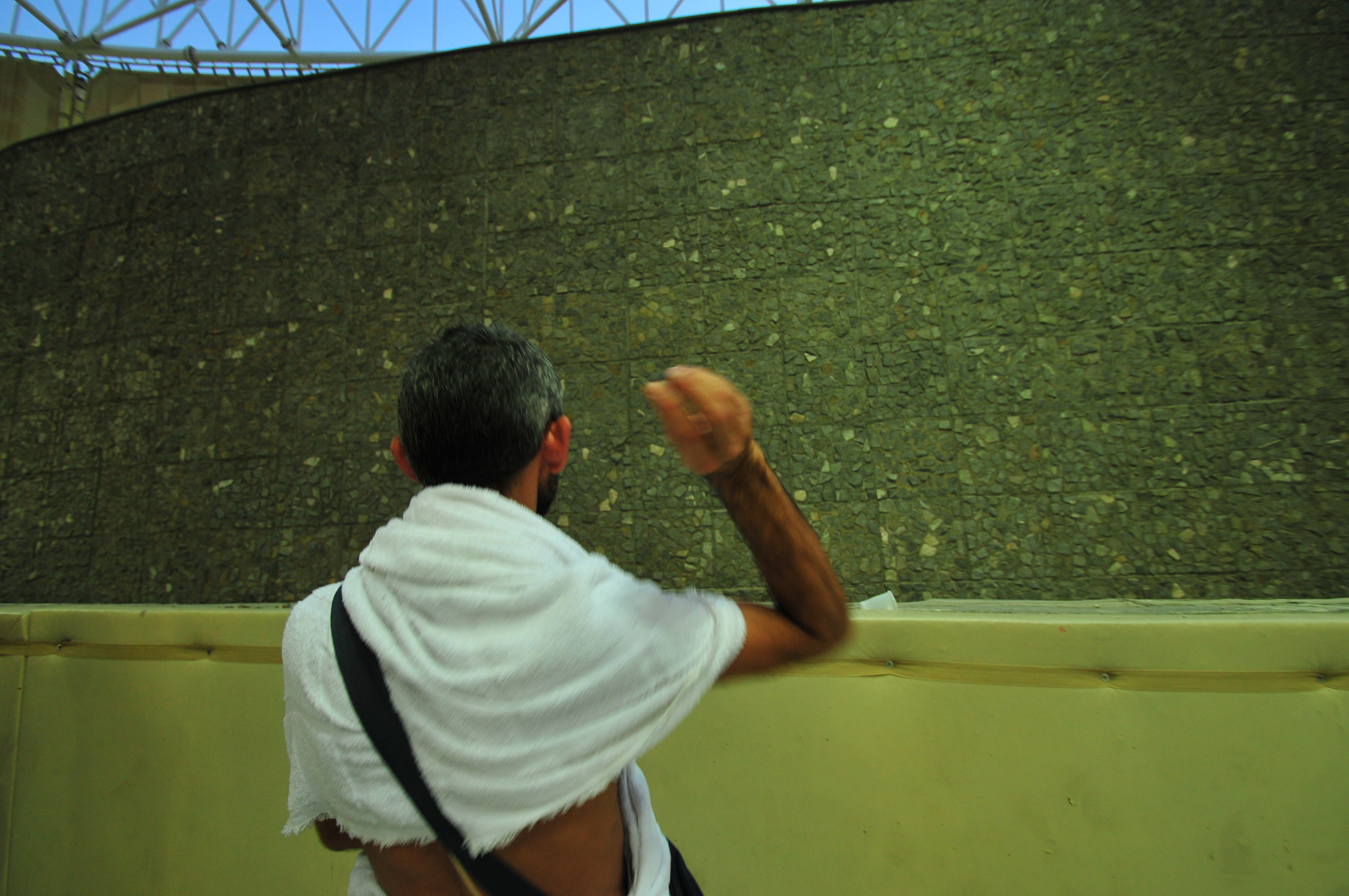
A Haji participating in the ritual of Jamarat

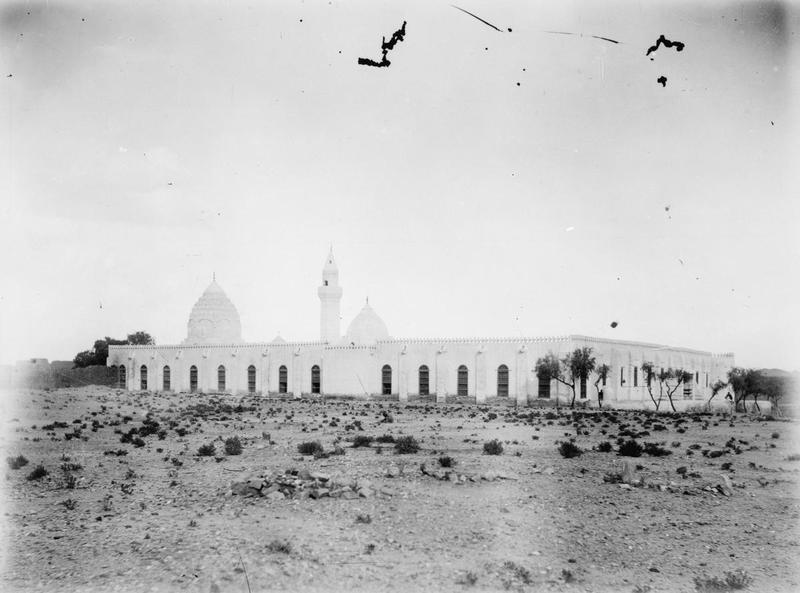
Image from 1907

== See also ==
- Arabian Peninsula
- Al-Khaif
- Sarat Mountains
- Hijaz Mountains
- Al-Mash'ar al-Haram Mosque
