= Muzdalifah =

City in Mecca, Saudi Arabia

Muzdalifah مُزْدَلِفَة
- City
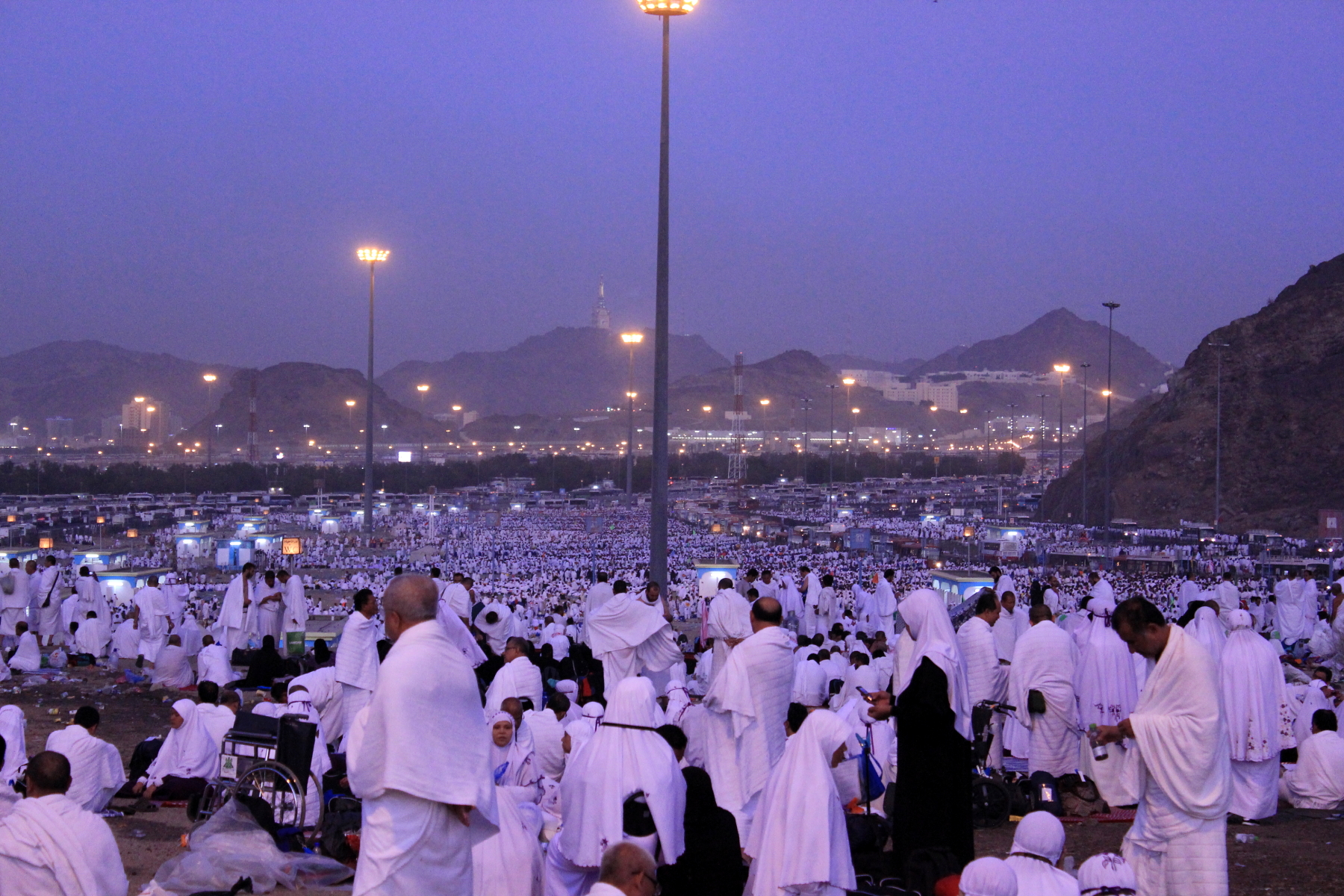

- Location of Mudalifah Muzdalifah (Middle East) Muzdalifah (West and Central Asia)
- Country: Saudi Arabia
- Region: Makkah

Government
  - Regional Governor: Khalid bin Faisal Al Saud
- Time zone: UTC+3 (A.S.T.)

Muzdalifah (Arabic: مُزْدَلِفَة) is an open and level area near Mecca in the Hejazi region of Saudi Arabia that is associated with the Ḥajj ("Pilgrimage"). It lies just southeast of Mina, on the route between Mina and Arafat.

In Pre-Islamic times the Hums being the Quraysh, Banu Kinanah, Banu Khuza'a and Banu 'Amir would camp at Muzdalifah and refuse to go to Mount Arafat with the other Arabs.

With the coming of Islam, the Hums were reprimanded for this behaviour and told to depart with the other Arabs in Quran 2:199.

== Pilgrimage ==
The stay at Muzdalifah is preceded by a day at Mount Arafat, consisting of glorifying God, repeating the duʿāʾ (Supplication), repentance to God, and asking him for forgiveness. At Arafat, Ẓuhr and ʿAṣr prayers are performed in a combined and abbreviated form during the time of Zuhr. After sunset on the ninth day of the Islamic month of Dhūl-Ḥijjah, Muslim pilgrims travel to Muzdalifah, sometimes arriving at night because of over-crowding. After arriving at Muzdalifah, pilgrims pray the Maghrib and ʿIshāʾ prayers jointly, whereas the Isha prayer is shortened to 2 rakats. At Muzdalifah, pilgrims collect pebbles for the Stoning of the Devil (Arabic: رَمِي ٱلْجَمَرَات, romanized: Ramī al-Jamarāt, lit. 'Stoning of the Place of Pebbles').

=== The Sacred Monument ===
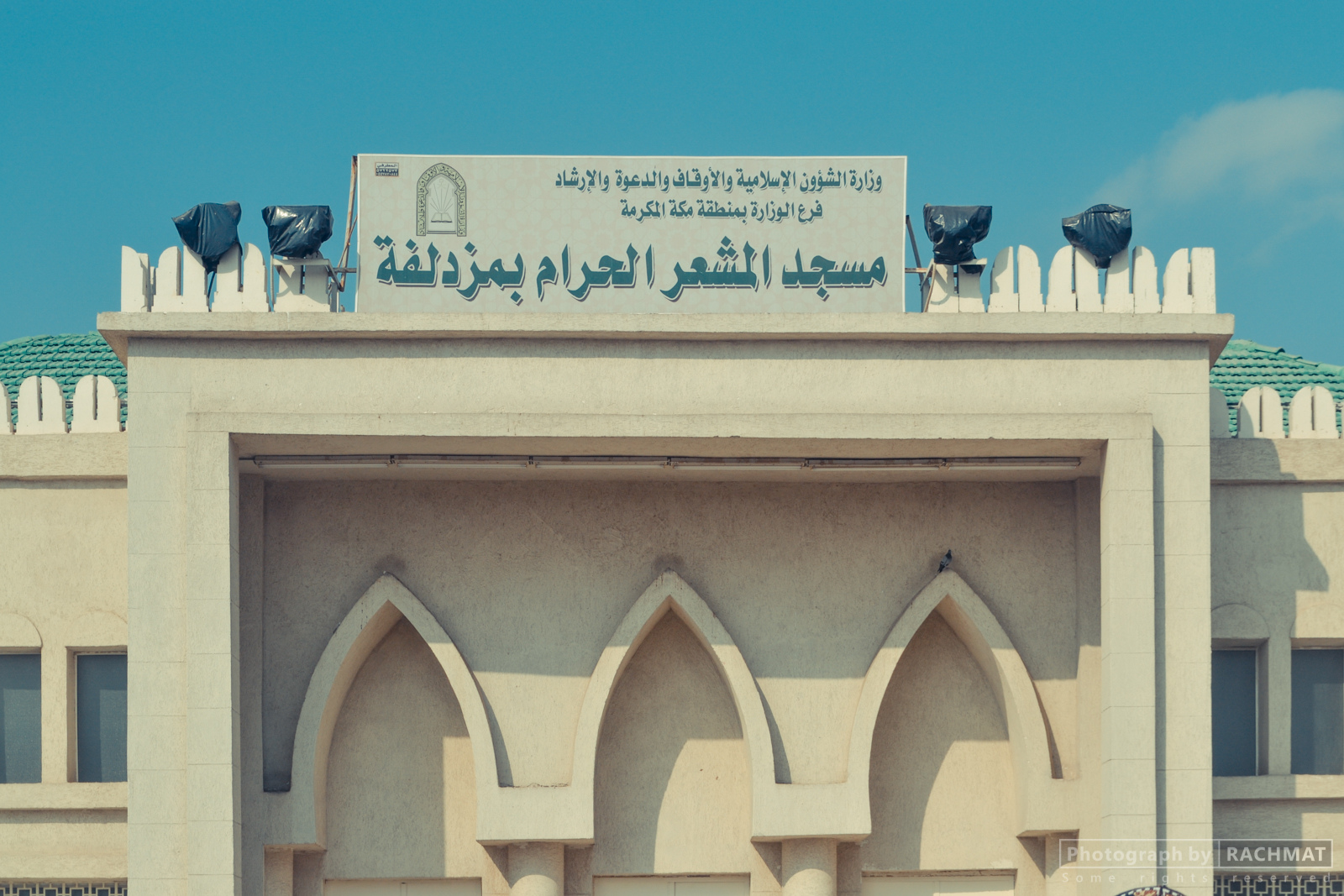
A-Mash'ar Al-Haram in 2015

The open-roofed mosque at Muzdalifah is known as "The Sacred Grove" (Arabic: ٱلْمَشْعَر ٱلْحَرَام, romanized: Al-Mašʿar Al-Ḥarām) in the Quran (2:198).

== See also ==
- Holiest sites in Islam
- Haram (site)
- List of mosques that are mentioned by name in the Quran
- Sarat Mountains
  - Hejaz Mountains
